= Alberto Santos-Dumont =

Brazilian aviation pioneer (1873–1932)

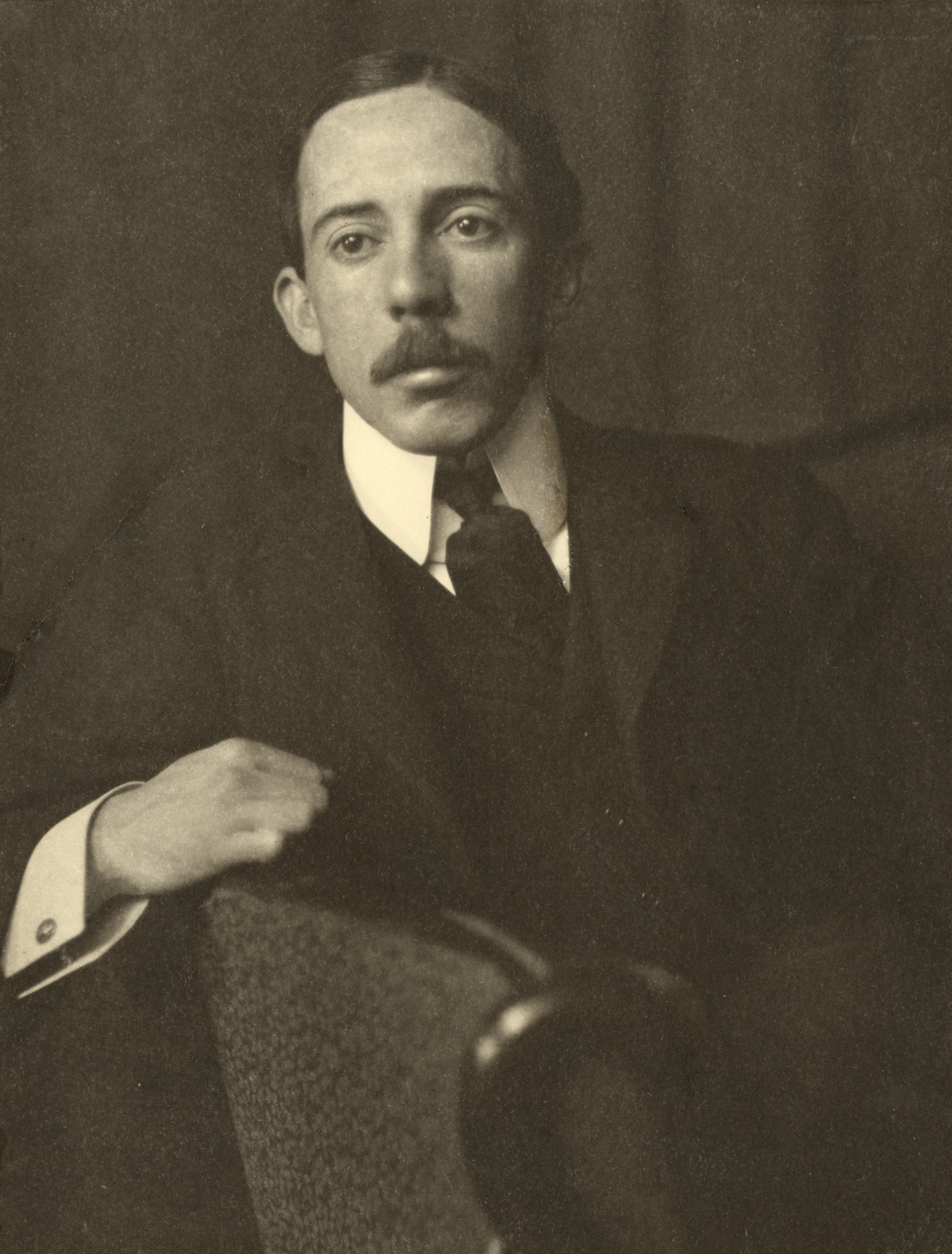
- Santos-Dumont in 1902
- Born: 20 July 1873; Palmira, Minas Gerais, Empire of Brazil
- Died: 23 July 1932 (aged 59); Guarujá, São Paulo, Second Brazilian Republic
- Resting place: São João Batista cemetery, Rio de Janeiro, Brazil
- Occupations: Aeronaut; inventor
- Known for: Santos-Dumont number 6; Santos-Dumont 14-bis; Santos-Dumont Demoiselle
- Parents: Henrique Dumont (father); Francisca de Paula Santos (mother)
- Awards: Deutsch prize; Archdeacon prize

Alberto Santos-Dumont (Note: Self-stylised as Alberto Santos=Dumont; Brazilian Portuguese pronunciation: [awˈbɛɾtu ˈsɐtus duˈmo].) (20 July 1873 – 23 July 1932) was a Brazilian aeronaut, sportsman, inventor, and one of the few people to have contributed significantly to the early development of both lighter-than-air and heavier-than-air aircraft. The heir of a wealthy family of coffee producers, he dedicated himself to aeronautical study and experimentation in Paris, where he spent most of his adult life. He designed, built, and flew the first powered airships and won the Deutsch prize in 1901, when he flew around the Eiffel Tower in his airship No. 6, becoming one of the most famous people in the world in the early 20th century.

Santos-Dumont then progressed to powered heavier-than-air machines and on 23 October 1906 flew about 60 metres at a height of two to three metres with the fixed-wing 14-bis (also dubbed the Oiseau de proie—"bird of prey") at the Bagatelle Gamefield in Paris, taking off unassisted by an external launch system. On 12 November in front of a crowd, he flew 220 metres at a height of six metres. These were the first heavier-than-air flights certified by the Aeroclub of France, the first such flights officially witnessed by an aeronautics recordkeeping body, and the first of their kind recognised by the Fédération Aéronautique Internationale.

Santos-Dumont is a national hero in Brazil, where it is popularly held that he preceded the Wright brothers in demonstrating a practical aeroplane. Numerous roads, plazas, schools, monuments, and airports there are dedicated to him, and his name is inscribed on the Tancredo Neves Pantheon of the Fatherland and Freedom. He was a member of the Brazilian Academy of Letters from 1931 until his suicide in 1932.

== Childhood ==
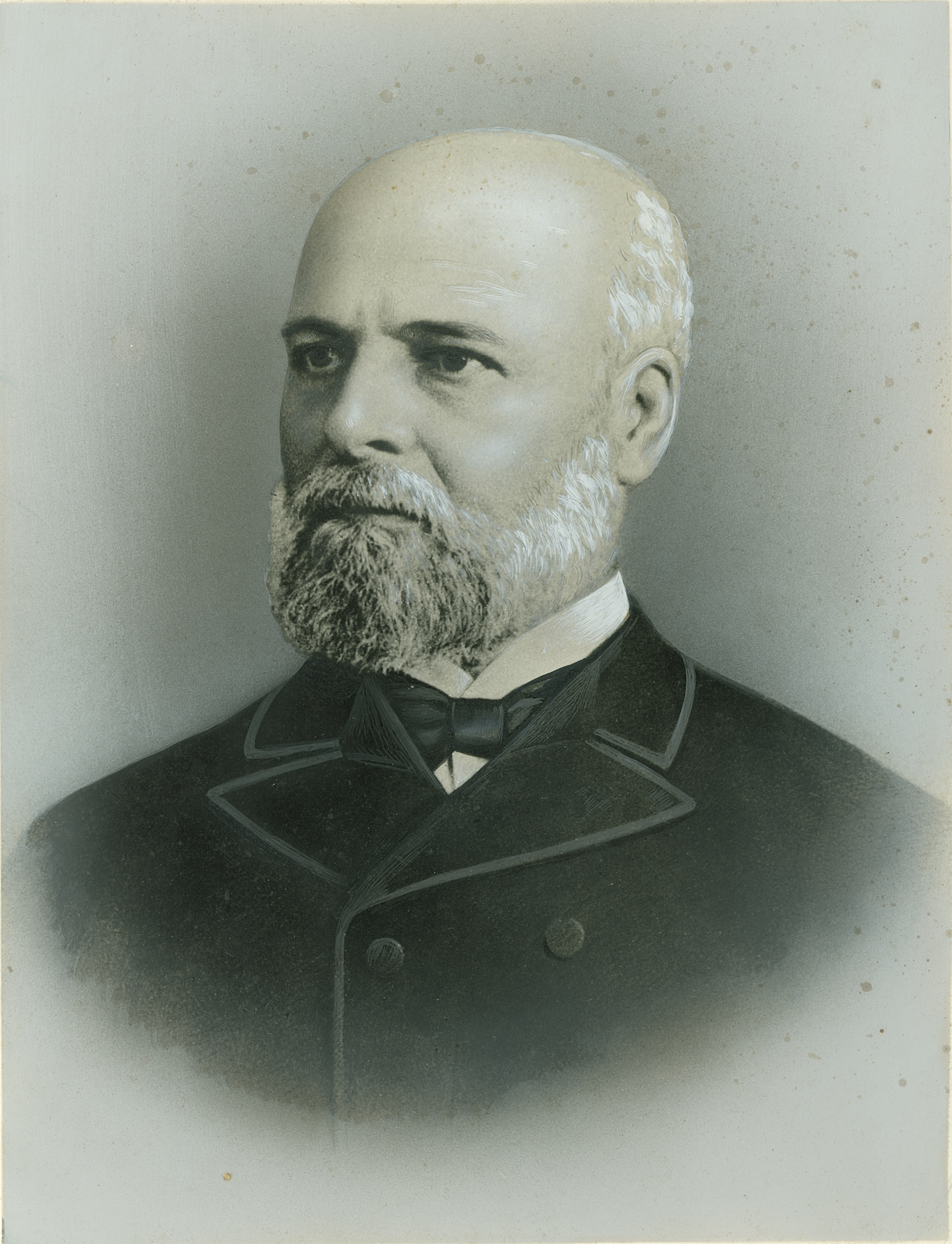
Henrique Dumont

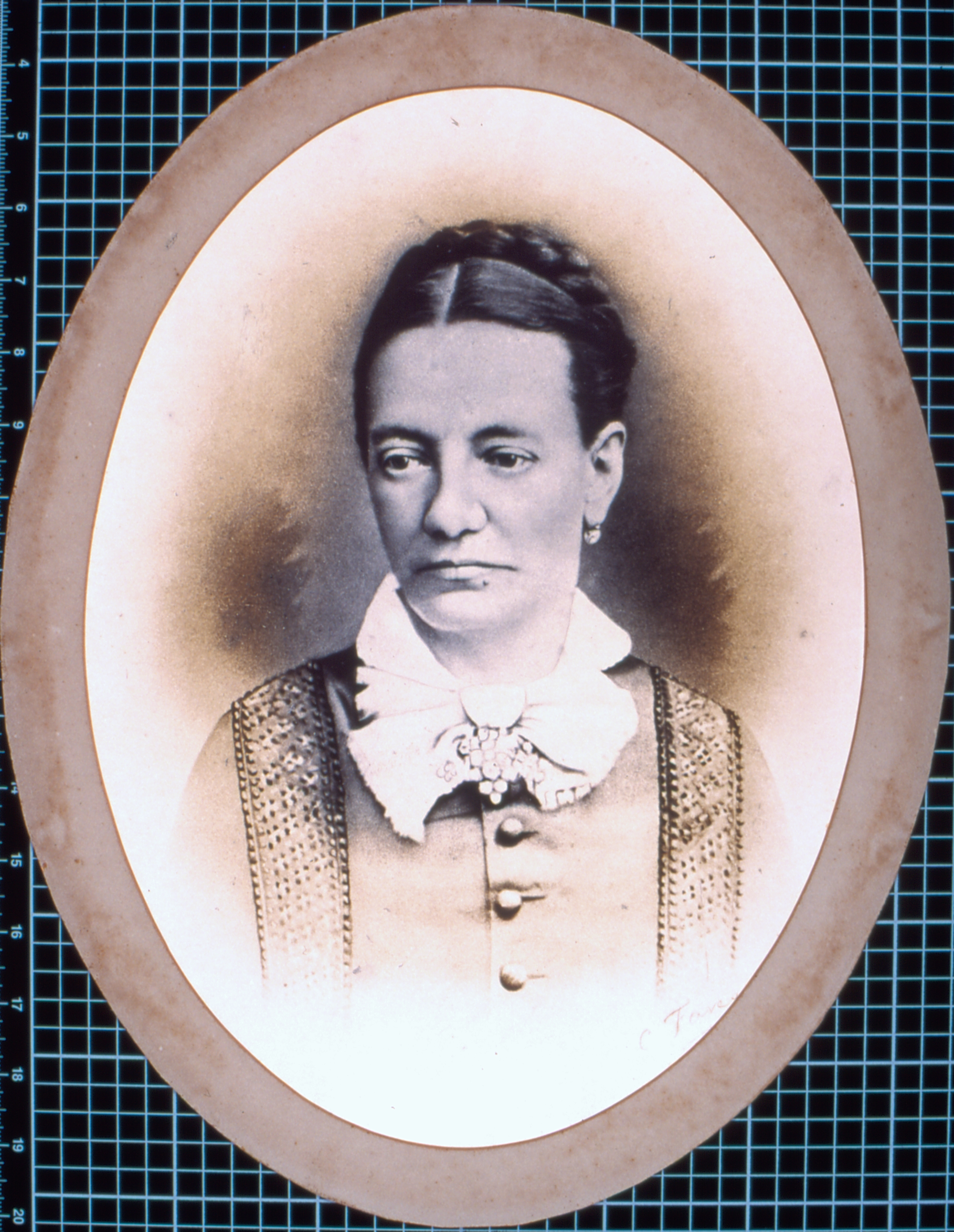
Francisca de Paula Santos

Alberto Santos-Dumont was the sixth child of Henrique Dumont—an engineer who graduated from the École Centrale des Arts et Manufactures in Paris—and Francisca de Paula Santos. The couple had eight children: Henrique dos Santos Dumont, Maria Rosalina Dumont Vilares, Virgínia Dumont Vilares, Luís dos Santos Dumont, Gabriela, Alberto Santos-Dumont, Sofia, and Francisca. In 1873, the family moved to the small town of Cabangu, in the municipality of João Aires, (Note: Later the name changed to Palmyra and then Santos Dumont in July 1932, by initiative of Oswaldo Henrique Castello Branco and later, to Santos-Dumont) so that Henrique Dumont could take part in the construction of the D. Pedro II railway. The project concluded when Alberto was six years old, at which point the family moved to São Paulo. (Note: O Cruzeiro, 25 de setembro de 1974 says that the family left Cabangu when Santos Dumont was 1 year old and from there they went to Casal, near Valença (Rio de Janeiro), where Henrique Dumont would manage the farm of his father-in-law, Francisco de Paula Santos. After friction between Henrique and Francisco, the family moved to the neighborhood of São Francisco Xavier.) It was during this period that Santos Dumont began to show early signs of his aeronautical interests; according to his parents, even at the age of one, he would puncture small rubber balloons to see what was inside. Santos Dumont was baptized by Father Teodoro Teotônio da Silva Carolina in Valença, at the Church of Santa Teresa, on 20 February 1877.

Santos-Dumont's birthplace and current Cabangu Museum

In 1879, the Dumonts sold their farm in Valença and settled at the Sítio do Cascavel, in Ribeirão Preto, where they purchased the Arindeúva farm (Note: It was later called Dumont Farm and was bought by an English syndicate. When they bought the farm, the family had 300 million réis and 80 slaves.)—spanning 1,200 alqueires (Note: With 60 to 96 kilometres of track and seven locomotives. A 1901 article in Le Pettit Journal indicated that the farm had four million coffee trees, six thousand workers, and four kilometres of railroad.)—from José Bento Junqueira. Until the age of 10, Alberto was taught to read and write by his older sister, Virgínia. From the age of 10 to 12, (Note: Medeiros 2006, says that Santos-Dumont only studied at this school between the ages of 10 and 11 (1883–1884). Jorge 2018 says it was between the ages of 7 and 8.) he attended the Colégio Culto à Ciência, though he did not particularly stand out among his classmates. He then studied at Colégio Kopke in São Paulo, Colégio Morton, and Colégio Menezes Vieira in Rio de Janeiro, (Note: The first college had strict discipline, while the others allowed a "more individualized teaching", but all were focused on the Brazilian elite.) and later at the Minas Gerais School of Engineering, without finishing the course.

Alberto was not considered an outstanding student; he studied only what interested him, supplementing his education through self-directed study in his father's library.By this time he already displayed the refined manners that would later become part of his image in France, alongside an introverted personality. In 1888, at the age of 15, he witnessed his first crewed flight in São Paulo (Note: Jorge 2018, p. 38 says that it happened in April 1890.) when the aeronaut Stanley Spencer ascended in a spherical balloon and descended by parachute. Following a family trip to Paris in 1891, Santos Dumont became increasingly interested in mechanics—especially the internal combustion engine. From that point on, he never stopped searching for alternatives, having received a grant of a million réis from the City Council of Ribeirão Preto—authorized by Law No. 100 of 4 November 1903—to further his research, which, three years later, resulted in the creation of his aeroplane. A contemporary newspaper reported that Dumont would only accept the funds if "…the amount were intended as a prize for an aircraft competition."

Santos-Dumont would remember with nostalgia the times spent on his father's farm, where he enjoyed the greatest freedom:

I lived a free life there, which was essential for shaping my temperament and my taste for adventure. From childhood, I had a great love for mechanical things, and—like anyone who possesses, or believes they possess, a vocation—I nurtured mine with care and passion. I would often amuse myself by imagining and building small mechanical devices, which entertained me and earned me great regard within the family. My greatest joy was tending to my father's mechanical installations. That was my domain, and it made me very proud."

Santos-Dumont during his teenager years, 1890s

At the age of seven Santos-Dumont was already driving the farm's trains, and at twelve he could operate a locomotive on his own, but the speed achievable on land was not enough for him. By observing coffee machines he deduced that oscillatory machines wore out more, while those with circular motion were more efficient.

By reading the works of Jules Verne, with whose fictional heroes he was later compared and whom he would meet in adulthood, Santos-Dumont got the desire to conquer the air. The submarines, balloons, ocean liners, and vehicles that the novelist envisioned in his works made a deep impression on the boy's mind. Years later, as an adult, he still remembered the adventures lived in imagination:

With Captain Nemo and his shipwrecked guests I explored the depths of the sea in that first of all submarines, the Nautilus. With Phileas Fogg I went round the world in eighty days. In "Screw Island" and "The Steam House" my boyish faith leaped out to welcome the ultimate triumphs of an automobilism that in those days had not as yet a name. With Hector Servadoc I navigated the air.

Technology fascinated him. He began building kites and small aeroplanes powered by propellers driven by twisted rubber springs—a detail he recalled in a comment regarding a letter he received on the day he won the Deutsch Prize: "This letter brings me back to the happiest days of my life, when, while waiting for better opportunities, I would practice by building aircraft out of straw reeds, with propellers driven by coiled rubber strips, or by crafting ephemeral silk-paper balloons." (Santos Dumont) Every year, on 24 June, he would release entire fleets of tiny silk balloons over the St. John's Day bonfires, to watch them climb into the sky.

== Career ==
=== Mountaineering, motorsports and ballooning ===
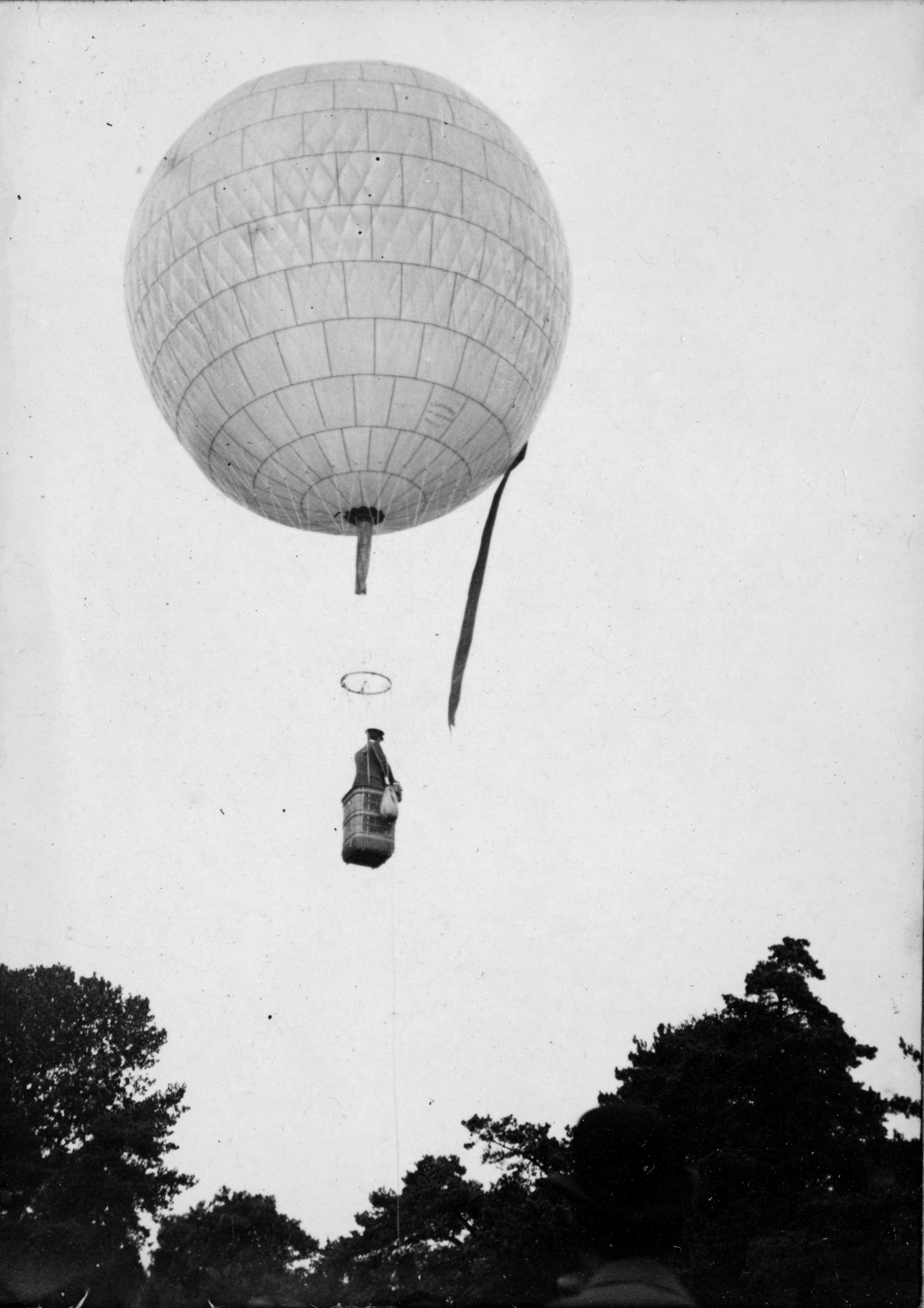
Santos-Dumont's first balloon, 1898

In 1891, when he was 18, Santos-Dumont visited Europe. In England he spent a few months practising his English, and in France he climbed Mont Blanc. This adventure, at an altitude of almost 5,000 metres, gave him a taste for heights. The following year, his father had a serious accident, and released Alberto from parental care on 12 February 1892, advising him to focus on learning mechanics, chemistry, and electricity. (Note: For the complete quote of what Henrique Dumont said, read What I Saw, What We Will See, pp. 12–13.) With that, Alberto left the Ouro Preto Mining Engineering School and returned to France where he took part in motor racing and cycling. He also began technical and scientific studies with a professor of Spanish origin named Garcia. (Note: Little is known about Santos-Dumont's education other than an unpublished manuscript showing that he studied the encyclopedias of Fonvielle and Flammarion, knew the history of flight, and knew some mathematics. Santos-Dumont and other inventors studied the works of Lilienthal and Cayley. He relied on self-education, with Garcia guiding him in his studies. Peter Wykeham describes Garcia as an advisor in his studies.) In 1894 Santos-Dumont travelled to the United States, visiting New York, Chicago, and Boston. Around this time (Note: Medeiros 2006a says that it happened in 1893, when Santos-Dumont was 21 years old. He was the only one among his siblings not to complete a college degree.) he went on to study at Merchant Venturers' Technical College, but never graduated. (Note: Between 1892 and 1897 he attended engineering courses at the Sorbonne and the College de France, without any official commitment.) Agenor Barbosa described Santos-Dumont in this period as a "student of little diligence, or rather, not at all studious for 'theories', but of admirable practical and mechanical talent and, since then, revealing himself in everything, of inventive genius", (Note: Exacta 2006: in an interview with Henrique Lins de Barros it is explained how Santos-Dumont's practical ability, as "a scientist who was in the proving ground", makes him a practical scientist, also because of the speed at which he advanced his creations in a decade, but it is an idea that has been fading as the importance of theoretical science has increased. Mattos 2012, says he was not a scientist, but an "integrator of technologies".) but who was later described by Agenor as someone focused on aviation from when "...'explosion engines' began to succeed."

In 1897, Santos-Dumont was independent and heir to an immense fortune (Note: Of 800 million réis or the equivalent of half a million dollars.) which he invested in the development of his projects, (Note: Santos-Dumont did not invest in aviation commercially, but recognised its economic and military potential.) applied in the stock market, allowing him to work without being accountable to any investor. (Note: Due to his success he received investment proposals from London and New York, but never accepted them. Santos Dumont also received income from his family.) At 24 years of age, Santos-Dumont left for France, where he hired professional aeronauts to teach him ballooning after reading the book Andrée – Au Pôle Nord en ballon. (Note: According to the book What I Saw, What We Will See, he considered taking his first balloon flight shortly after going to study in France, but the price of 1000 French francs and being liable for any damage discouraged him, showing that the balloonists of the time exaggerated the risks of flight in order to make more profit. The firm Lachambre & Machuron did not make these demands.) On 23 March 1898, he made his first ascent in a Lachambre & Machuron balloon at a cost of 400 francs, (Note: The book What I Saw, What We Will See says it was 250 francs.) later saying that: "I will never forget the genuine pleasure of my first balloon ascent". That year, even before he was known as a balloonist, he began to be quoted by the media due to his involvement in motor racing.

On 30 May 1898 he made his first night ascent, and the following month he started working as a captain, taking groups of passengers aloft in a hired balloon. By 1900 he had created nine balloons, of which two became famous: the Brazil and the Amérique. Brazil first flew on 4 July 1898, and was the smallest aircraft built at the time – inflated with hydrogen, it covered 113 metres in a silk envelope (Note: Japanese silk, instead of the usual Chinese.) of 6 metres in diameter, weighing 27.5 kg without the crewman and made more than 200 flights. (Note: In Brazil he experimented with Japanese silk, creating a lighter balloon than the established materials of taffeta or varnished paper. Before flying "Brazil", Lachambre's team let him do ascents in France and Belgium as a way to gain experience.) According to biographer Gondin da Fonseca, he was influenced to create his first balloon after racing at the Paris-Amsterdam race on his tricycle, where he crossed 110 kilometers in two hours, abandoning after an accident. (Note: According to Jorge 2018, p. 81, despite having the most powerful vehicle in the race, Santos Dumont abandoned it for fear of damaging his new engine and soon after this, he started the project of the No. 1. In 1899 he took part in the Nice-Castellane-Nice race. In this early period, Santos Dumont also rented the velodrome Parc aux Princes to hold the first tricycle race in France.) The second balloon, Amérique, held 500m^{3} of hydrogen and was 10 metres in diameter, and was capable of carrying passengers. With the second balloon he faced everything from storms to accidents. In his first experiments he was awarded a prize by the French Aeroclub for his study of atmospheric currents; he reached high altitudes and stayed airborne for more than 22 hours. Santos-Dumont advocated for government investment in aviation development (Note: In the United States Samuel Langley received $50,000 from the War Department and $20,000 from the Smithsonian Institution for the development of the Aerodrome, launched by a catapult and abandoned after two takeoff accidents on 7 October and 8 December 1903. His biggest development was a 50 hp engine, which did not influence the US aviation industry due to the atmosphere of secrecy aviation had there.) and the importance of public opinion, something previously noted by Júlio César Ribeiro de Sousa.

=== Airships ===
Airships, powered aerostats, were first demonstrated and patented by the colonial Portuguese priest Bartolomeu de Gusmão in 1709, and were flown by the Montgolfier Brothers in 1783, but until the late 19th century had yet to be mastered, having been attempted by Henri Giffard, (Note: A 1902 Argentinean article commented on the similarities between Giffard and Santos-Dumont.) Charles Renard and Arthur Constantin Krebs in a flight with an electric motor in a closed circuit (Note: According to Henrique Lins de Barros, they were left to the mercy of the wind. The engine of Renard's balloon in 1890 reached 55 revolutions per minute; Santos-Dumont's Deutsch Prize flight reached 200. After Santos-Dumont won the Deutsch Prize, Renard's colleagues claimed that he had merely replicated Renard's secret work.) in a project abandoned by the French Army, and by the Brazilian Júlio César Ribeiro de Sousa, without success. (Note: From the 18th century it had been proposed to use sails, steam engines, human propulsion and electric motors, without success. David Schwarz developed an airship with metal cladding and a combustion engine, but died without testing it.) Public demonstrations, such as those performed by Santos-Dumont, were important in the sceptical academic environment.

Due to the weight of electric motors, Santos-Dumont chose the internal combustion engine. In initial tests, he hoisted the tricycle he had used in the Paris-Amsterdam race up a tree to check for vibration, which did not occur. He modified the engine by putting the two cylinders on top of each other, creating a lightweight 3.5 horsepower unit, which was the first internal combustion engine successfully used in aeronautics. (Note: Henrique Lins de Barros, in an article from 2021, says that this engine was patented by the inventor. The "Correio Paulistano" says that the engine was refused by the Paris Aeroclub because of the inventor's nationality.) An article presented in CENDOC 2021, claims that the aeronautical movement in France was sparked by Santos-Dumont's experiments and Santos-Dumont said he believed his experiences led to the founding of the Aéro-Club de France.

A detail raised by Santos-Dumont refers to the definition of what would be heavier than air: in June 1902 he published an article in the North American Review arguing that his work on airships was about aviation, because hydrogen gas itself was not capable of taking off, and engine power was also needed. He also wrote: "...the flying-machine will be achieved only by the way of evolution, by making the air-ship pass through a series of transformations analogous to the metamorphoses by which the chrysalis becomes the winged butterfly."

=== No. 1 ===
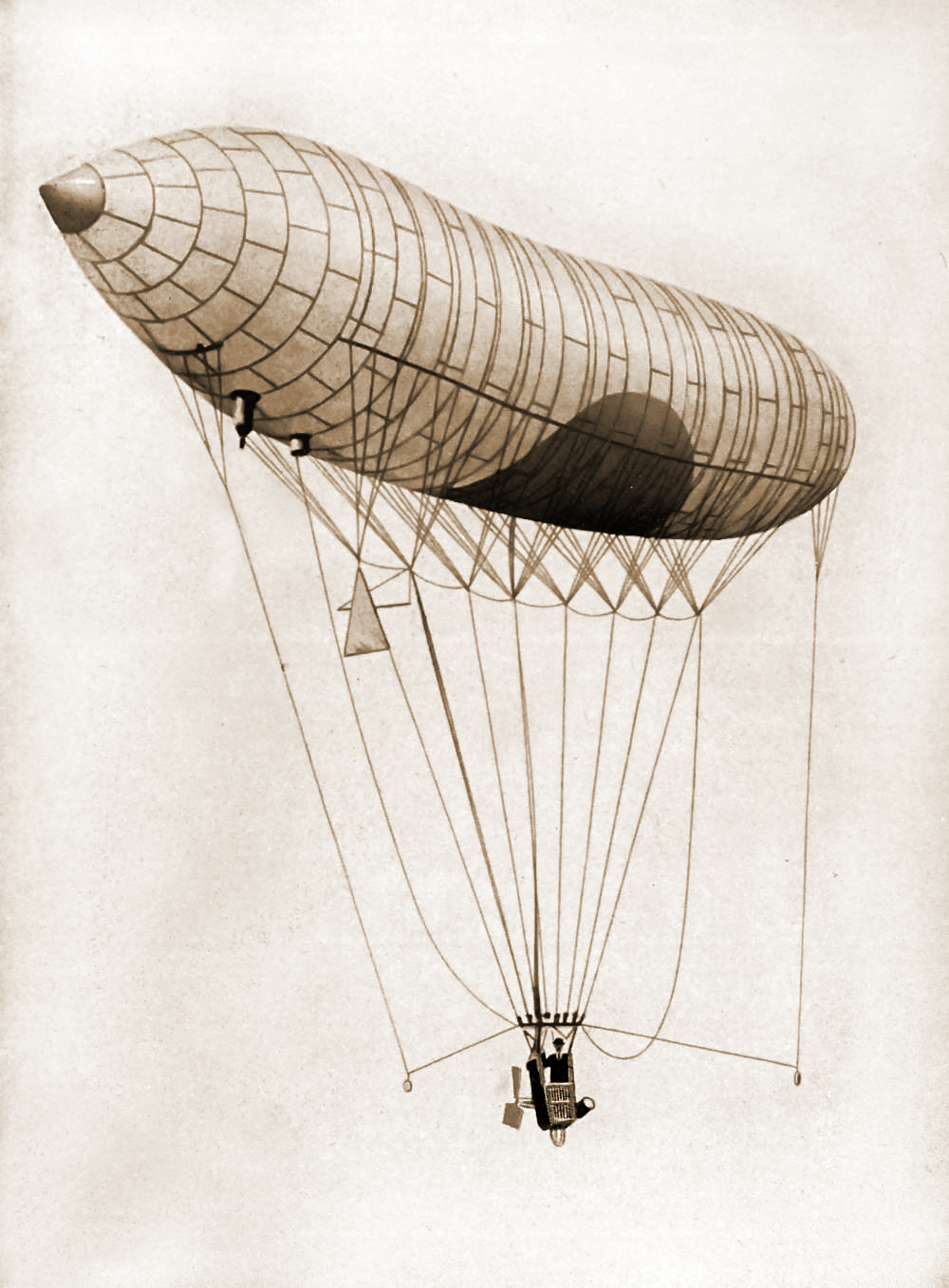
Airship No. 1

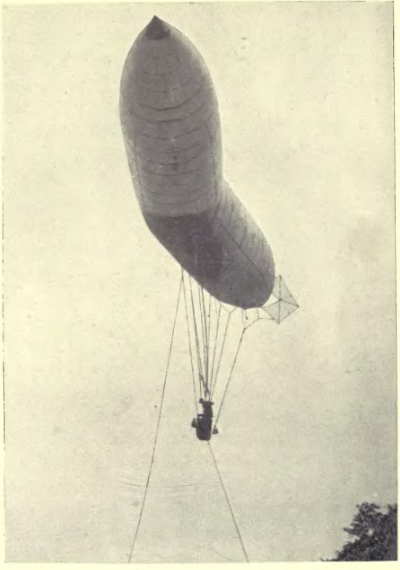
Airship No. 2

The first airship designed by Santos-Dumont, the No. 1, was 25 metres long with a volume of 186 cubic metres, (Note: He used a simple numbering system in his inventions, but made several modifications without changing the numbering. For example, "...the N. 16 appears sometimes with an engine turning one propeller, sometimes with two engines mounted on a new structure, connected to two propellers.") made its first takeoff attempt in February 1898, (Note: Barros 2003 says that the first attempt took place in September 1893, but that due to bad positioning the airship was launched against the treetops.) after being inflated in Henri Lachambre's workshops in Vaugirard. Snowy conditions caused the airship to flex and crash. "At a height of five or six metres, over Longchamp, the apparatus suddenly bent and the crash began. Of my entire career, this is the most abominable memory I have in store."

No. 1 was inflated again in the Aclimation Garden in Paris on 18 September 1898, but was damaged before it could fly, due to a misjudgement by the ground crew holding the ropes. Repaired two days later, the aircraft took off and flew. The air pump for the internal balloon, which kept the envelope rigid, did not work properly, and the airship, at a height of 400 metres, began to flex and descend rapidly. In an interview, Santos-Dumont told how he escaped death:

The descent was at a speed of 4 to 5 m/sec. It would have been fatal if I hadn't had the presence of mind to tell the passersby, spontaneously suspended from the dangling cable like a real human cluster, to pull the cable in the opposite direction to the wind. Thanks to this manoeuvre, the speed of the fall decreased, thus avoiding the greater violence of the shock. I thus varied my amusement: I went up in a balloon and came down in a kite.

=== No. 2 ===
In 1899, Santos-Dumont built a new aircraft, No. 2, with the same length and similar shape, but a larger diameter of 3.8 metres, increasing the volume to 200 cubic metres. To address the unreliability of the air pump which had almost killed him, he added a small aluminium fan to maintain pressure and rigidity.

The first test was scheduled for 11 May 1899. At the time of the flight, rain made the balloon heavy. The demonstration consisted of simple manoeuvres with the aircraft attached by a rope, but ended in the adjacent trees. The airship had folded under the combined action of the contraction of the hydrogen and the force of the wind.

=== No. 3 ===
In September 1899 Santos-Dumont started the construction of a new elongated airship, the No. 3, (Note: Mattos 2012, says that this airship used the design of Albert and Gaston Tissandier. The reuse of earlier concepts was something done by Santos-Dumont and other inventors in France. The FlightGlobal (1909a) stated: "The Voisin brothers and their engineer and works manager M. Colliex make no secret of the fact that they have based their work on that of pioneers such as Lilienthal, Langley, and others, and in fact they say they never miss an opportunity of utilizing any information or data on which that can lay hands." The inventors shared some data but acted independently of each other.) inflated with lighting gas, 20 metres long and 7.5 metres in diameter, with a capacity of 500 cubic metres. The basket was the same one used in the two other aircraft.

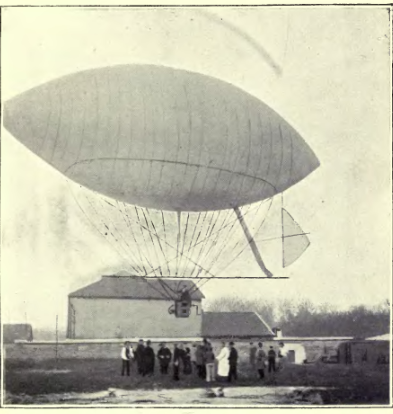
Airship No. 3

At 3:30 pm on 13 November Santos-Dumont took off in No. 3 from Vaugirard Aerostation Park and went around the Eiffel Tower for the first time. From the monument he went to the Parc des Princes then to the Bagatelle Gamefield in the Bois de Boulogne (near the Hippodrome of Longchamp). He landed at the exact spot where No. 1 had crashed, this time under control.

From that day on, I no longer had the slightest doubt about the success of my invention. (Note: The No. 3 was the first aircraft in aviation history to be successfully propelled by a combustion engine.) I recognized that I would, for life, be dedicated to aircraft construction. I needed to have my workshop, my aeronautical garage, my hydrogen-generating apparatus, and a plumbing system to connect my installation to the illuminating gas pipelines.

Santos-Dumont had a large hangar built at the Saint-Cloud site, large enough to hold No. 3 when completely filled, as well as the equipment to make the hydrogen gas. This hangar, completed on 15 June 1900, was 30 metres long, 7 metres wide, and 11 metres high. (Note: It is considered to be the world's first hangar, as well as heralding the invention of sliding doors.) It was no longer intended to house No. 3, which had been abandoned, but No. 4, completed on 1 August 1900. With No. 3 he broke the record of 23 hours in the air. He tried to fly almost every day, demonstrating the reliability and usefulness of his aircraft.

=== No. 4 ===
On 24 March 1900, the millionaire oil magnate Henri Deutsch de la Meurthe sent the President of the Aéro-Club de France, which had been founded two years earlier, a letter in which he promised 100,000 francs to anyone who could invent an efficient flying machine:

Desirous of contributing to the solution of the problem of air travel, I undertake to place at the disposal of the Air Club a sum of 100,000 francs, constituting a prize, under the title of the Air Club Prize, to the aeronaut who, leaving the park of Saint Cloud, Longchamps, or any other point situated at an equal distance from the Eiffel Tower, reaches this monument in half an hour, and, surrounding it, returns to the point of departure. (...) If one of the competitors is judged to have fulfilled the program, the prize will be awarded to him by the President of the Club himself, to whom I will immediately put the amount indicated above. If at the end of five years, beginning on April 15 of the current year, 1900, no one has won it, I consider my commitment null and void. (Note: For the full text in Portuguese, read)

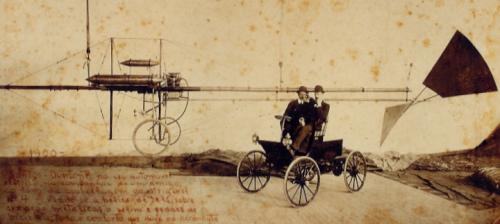
Keel from No. 4

The challenge became known as the Deutsch Prize. The regulations stipulated that an aircraft must be able to fly to the Eiffel Tower, round the monument, and return to the place of ascent in no more than thirty minutes, without stops, a total of 11 kilometres, under the eyes of a commission from the Aeroclub de France convened at least one day in advance. This required a minimum average speed of 22 km/h.

The award encouraged Alberto Santos-Dumont to try faster flights with No. 4. The aircraft was 420 cubic metres in volume, 29 metres long, and 5.6 metres in diameter. (Note: For an in-depth look at the characteristics of the No. 4, read CENDOC 2021, p. 24) Underneath was a 9.4-metre bamboo keel, in the middle of which were the saddle and pedals of an ordinary bicycle. Astride the saddle, the pilot had under his feet the starting pedals of a 7 hp engine, which powered a front propeller with two 4-metre long silk blades. Next to the pilot were ropes with which he could control the carburettor and valve settings, the rudder, ballast, and displacement weights. Santos-Dumont made almost daily flights in No. 4 from Saint Cloud during August. On 19 September, before members of the International Congress of Aeronauts, he proved the effectiveness of an aerial propeller driven by an oil engine by flying repeatedly against the wind, even with a broken rudder, impressing the scientists present. The general impression was that he would win the Deutsch Prize, and upon going to Nice after falling ill, he began designing No. 5.

=== No. 5 and No. 6 ===
Alberto Santos-Dumont in 1901 showing Charles Rolls, one of the pioneers of aviation, the plans for his airship (Collection from the USP Paulista Museum. Santos Dumont Collection).

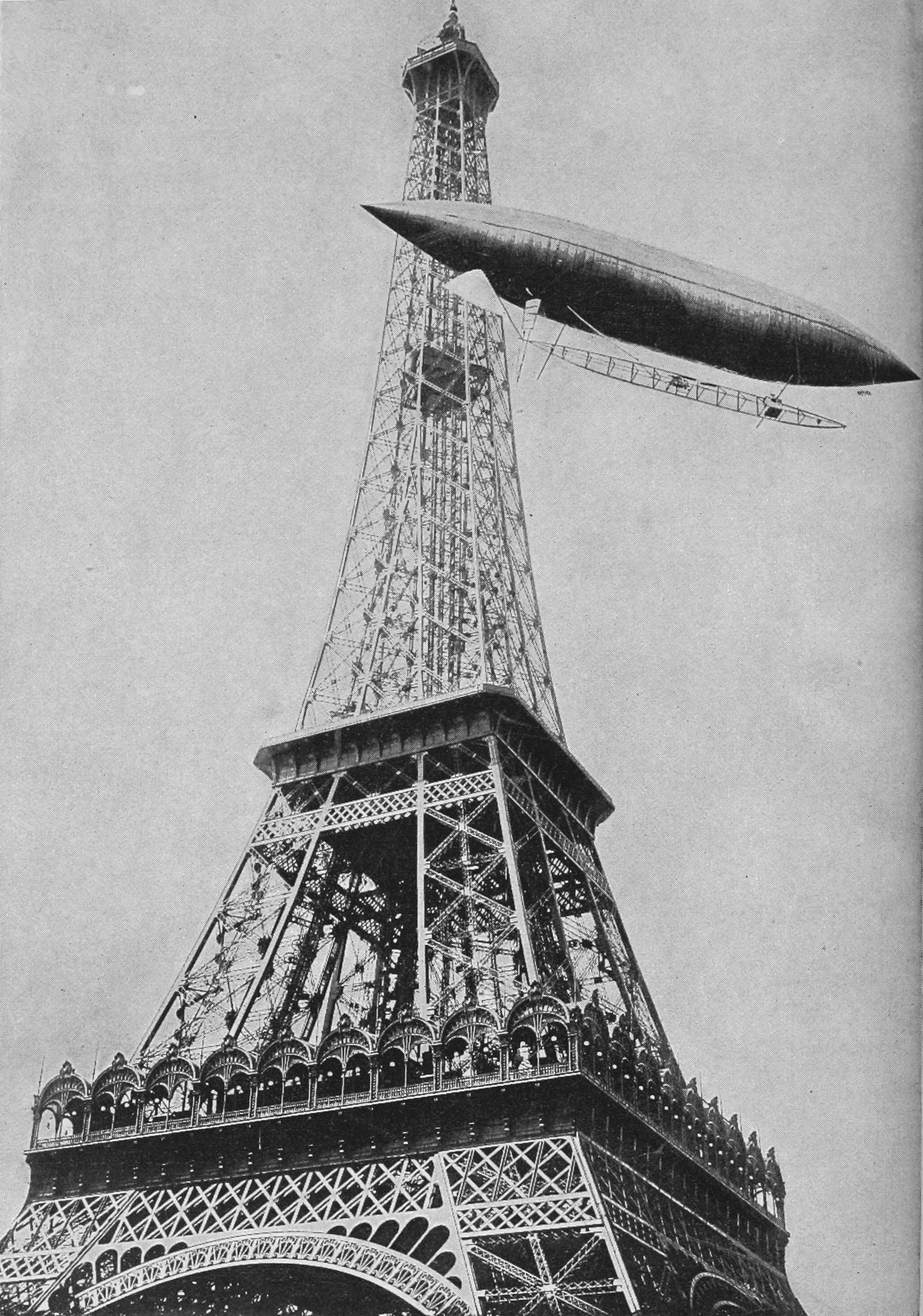
Santos-Dumont circling the Eiffel Tower with the airship No. 5, 13 July 1901

No. 5 was built to compete for the Henry Deutsch de la Meurthe award (Note: Before No. 5 he flew in Le Fatum, a balloon built by Santos-Dumont and Emmanuel Aimé to conduct experiments in aerostatic equilibrium with Emmanuel Aimé's Thermosphére equipment. It was an elongated aircraft 7 metres high and 310 cubic metres.) for a flight from the Aero-Club de France airfield in Saint-Cloud to the Eiffel Tower and back in 30 minutes. It used the extended envelope of No. 4, from which a triangular gondola (Note: The triangular section keel, which provided greater rigidity for less weight and was used in other airships by other inventors, was his main innovation.) made of pine was suspended. Other innovations included the use of piano wire to suspend the gondola, reducing drag, and the use of water ballast tanks. It was powered by a 12 hp, 4-cylinder air-cooled engine driving a propeller,

On 13 April the Santos-Dumont Prize was created. It was similar to the Deutsch Prize, but had no time limit. (Note: A prize of the same name was mentioned in the September 1906 issue of L'Aérophile, where Santos-Dumont offered 4,000 francs to the aeronaut who stayed in the air for 48 hours without stopping.) On 13 July 1901, (Note: Barros 2021 says that on this day he had an accident, falling "...over the tallest chestnut tree in Mr Edmond de Rothschild's park".) After some experimental outings, Santos-Dumont competed with No. 5 in the Deutsch Award for the first time. It completed the required course, but exceeded the time limit for the race by ten minutes. At that time, he met Princess Imperial Isabel, after an accident. On 29 July he aborted a flight when he cut his fingers on the guide-rope; around that time French aeronauts started a smear campaign against Santos-Dumont.

On 8 May, trying for the prize again, he crashed his aircraft into the Hotel Trocadero; the balloon exploded and was completely destroyed, but he escaped unscathed and publicly tested the engine to show its reliability. (Note: After the accident Deutsch de la Meurthe considered changing the route of the award to avoid flights over the city, but was prevented by the opinion of other aeronauts.) The accident was caused by one of the automatic valves having a weakened spring, which allowed the escape of gas.

After offering his own 21 cubic metre balloon which was under construction – and being politely refused – Henri Deutsch said, "I'm afraid the experiments will not be conclusive. Mr Santos-Dumont's balloon will always be at the mercy of the wind, and is therefore not the kind of aircraft we dream of." Santos-Dumont crashed his No. 6 at the Longchamps racetrack on 19 September 1901.

On 19 October 1901, with the 622-cubic-metre No. 6 balloon powered by a 20 hp engine, (Note: For more about No. 6, see CENDOC 2021, pp. 56–57, O Santos-Dumont VI explicado por um especialista) he executed the test in 29 minutes and 30 seconds, (Note: Dumont faced southeast winds that reached 21 km/h at the height of the Eiffel Tower. He reached the tower in 9 minutes travelling at a speed of 36 km/h, passing 10 metres above the top of the monument and 50 metres from the lightning rods, saying: "I have always feared, as the gravest of all dangers, going around the Eiffel tower". On going around he had to abandon the controls due to engine problems and returned with the engine failing and losing altitude.) but it took about a minute to land, which caused the committee to initially deny the award. (Note: This addition to the regulations was only made later, when Santos-Dumont was preparing for his new attempt, which led him to take a stand against the decision and announce that he would donate his prize money.) This became a matter of controversy, as the public and Deutsch believed that the aviator had won. After some time and the aviator protesting this decision, it was reversed. He became internationally recognised as the world's greatest aviator and the inventor of the airship. The prize was then 100,000 francs plus interest, that Santos-Dumont distributed among his staff and the unemployed and workers in Paris who for some reason had "pawned their tools of labor" with help from the City Hall of Paris. (Note: 75,000 francs were donated to the poor through the city hall and the rest was distributed among his staff.) A month before the event, by announcing this intention, he had obtained "unrestricted support from public opinion". The money was released on 4 November after a vote in which nine members of the Aeroclub opposed and fifteen supported. This delay served to put public opinion further in Santos-Dumont's favour. The same afternoon, he sent a letter of resignation to the Aeroclub. Mauricio Pazini Brandão, in The Santos-Dumont legacy to aeronautics, says that this event should be considered as the certification of the airship.

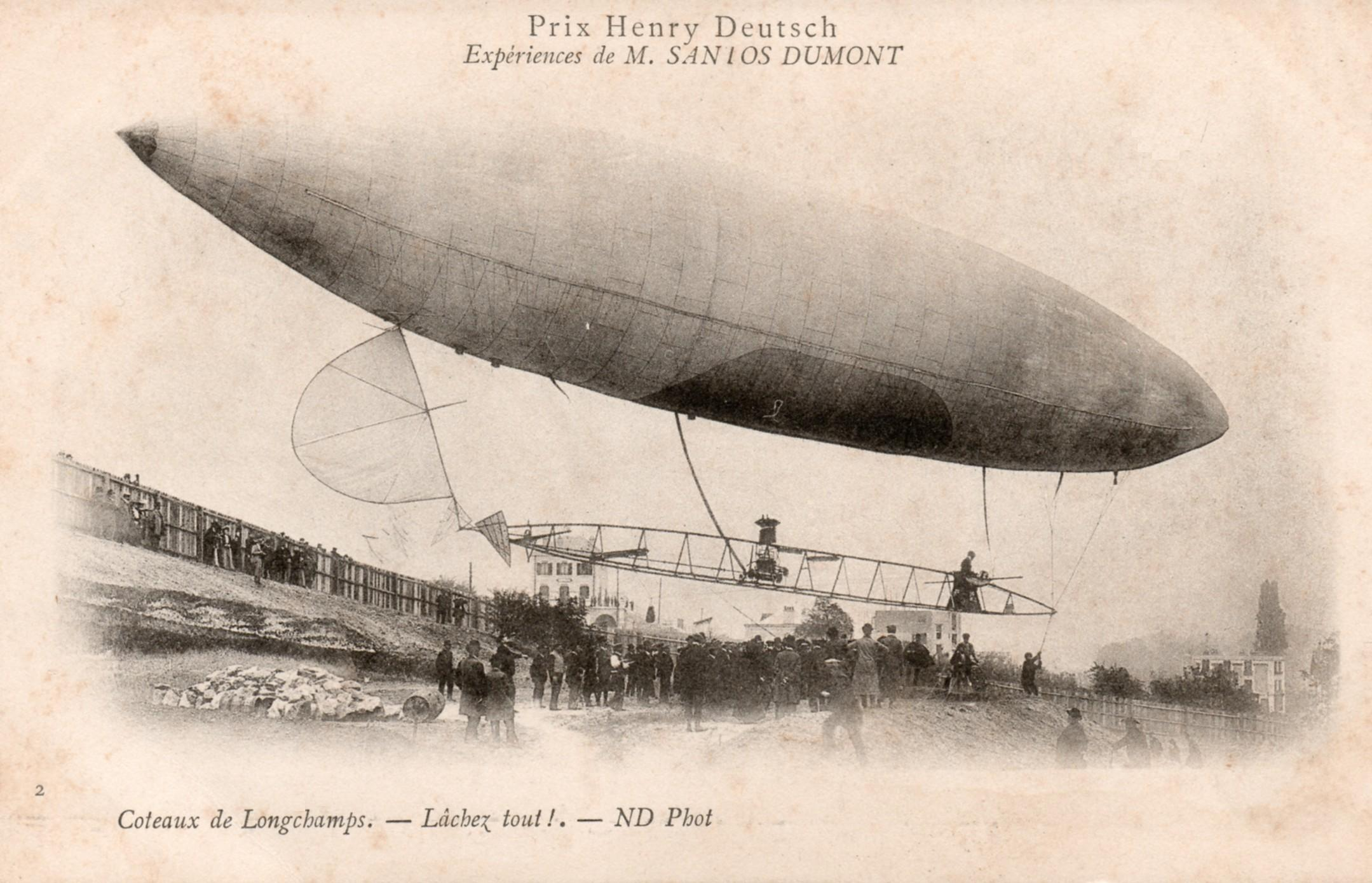
No. 6 airship

After winning the Deutsch Prize, Santos-Dumont received letters from several countries, congratulating him; (Note: Following his success with No. 5, the European media were mistaken about his nationality. See example (US) at CENDOC 2021, p. 56, Dumont agora é o capitão do azul e grandioso ar A Spanish newspaper claimed he was a naturalised Frenchman.) magazines published lavish, richly illustrated editions to reproduce his image and perpetuate the achievement; an Alexander Graham Bell interview in the New York Herald explored the reasons for Santos-Dumont's success, envy of other inventors, and the experiments that preceded him; tributes were paid in France, Brazil, England, where the English Aero Club offered a banquet, and several other countries. The president of Brazil, Campos Sales sent him prize money of 100 million réis (Note: According to John M. Overstreet, this money would have been reinvested by Santos Dumont to recover the cost of producing the Nº6.) following the proposal of Augusto Severo, as well as a gold medal with his effigy and an allusion to Camões: "Through skies never sailed before"; The Brazilian people were apathetic, and in January 1902, Albert I, Prince of Monaco invited him to continue his experiments in the Principality. He offered him a new hangar on the beach at La Condamine, and everything else Albert thought necessary for his comfort and safety, which was accepted; his success also inspired the creation of several biographies and influenced fictional characters, such as Tom Swift; That April, Santos-Dumont travelled to the United States, where he visited Thomas Edison's laboratories in New York. They discussed patents. (Note: For Edison it would be impossible to patent the aeroplane due to the research and development already done; therefore, he did not work on it beyond a small engine powered by gunpowder.) The American asked Santos-Dumont to create the Aero Club of the US; when justifying not charging for demonstration flights in St Louis, Santos-Dumont said: "I am an amateur". (Note: At another point in the trip, he showed himself willing to accept partnerships and sponsors.) After the meeting with Edison, Santos-Dumont told the American press that he did not intend to patent his aircraft. He was received at the White House in Washington, DC, by President Theodore Roosevelt and talked to U.S. Navy and Army officials about the possibility of using airships as a defence tool against submarines. In July 1902, after the creation of the Aeroclub of the US, Santos-Dumont announced a series of flights in American territory. These did not take place, confusing the media and American public opinion. He left New York in late 1902, without having made any flights, and the American public did not consider his inventions to be practical.

At the beginning of the 20th century, Santos-Dumont was the only person in the world capable of controlled flight. After his time in the US, he learned of the fatal accident of Augusto Severo and the suicide of his mother; he returned to England, where he had left No. 6 being prepared for an exhibition at the Crystal Palace, as well as planning to fly into London. The fabric of the airship was punctured, as confirmed by the balloonist Stanley Spencer. The initial view was that the balloon had been cut with a knife, with Santos-Dumont stating that "...whole sections were cut and removed" and that he had previously experienced similar.

=== Monaco ===
In Monaco, (Note: For more about the flights in Monaco, see The Over-Sea Experiments of Santos-Dumont.) after accepting Prince Albert's invitation, Santos-Dumont guided the construction of a 55 metre long, 10 metre wide and 15 metre high hangar, with doors he designed which weighed 10 tons, (Note: Despite their weight, they were opened by Princes Constantinesco and Marescotti Ruspoli, aged eight and ten.) on the Boulevard de La Condamine by the sea. On testing the guide wire over the sea, he found that it stabilised the aircraft in low-level flight. Santos-Dumont also demonstrated that overall the aircraft behaved well over water, reaching up to 42 km/h (26 mph). Its success made clear the potential military use of the aircraft, especially for anti-submarine warfare, but its flights in the principality were interrupted by a crash in the Bay of Monaco on 14 February 1902. The crash was due to the balloon being "imperfectly filled when leaving the garage". After the accident he began to perform a check list before each take-off, but No. 6 was badly damaged. (Note: It was taken to England for an exhibition and possible flights.)

=== Nos. 7, 8, 9 and 10 ===
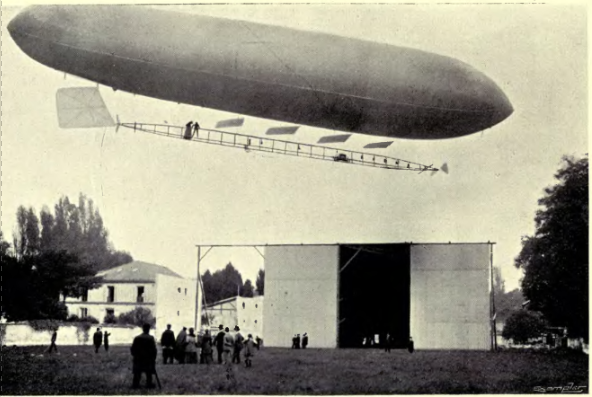
Airship No. 10

Santos-Dumont started to dedicate himself to the construction of new airship models, two years after he left Paris, each one with a specific purpose: the No. 7, with 1,257 cubic metres and 45 hp engine, designed to be a racing airship, was tested in Neuilly (France) in May 1904. (Note: For more about No. 7, see CENDOC 2021, p. 76, O "Santos-Dumont VII") The following month the aircraft was sabotaged in an exhibition organised in St. Louis, United States, (Note: Santos-Dumont represented France at the event.) when a person who was never identified made four 1-metre cuts in the balloon which, because it was folded, resulted in forty-eight cuts in the envelope, when it was in New York Customs. (Note: Santos-Dumont had left the crate with the balloon open after applying a varnish. Carl Meyes, saying that the cuts were made by "a large cordless penknife with the sole perverse purpose of destroying the balloon", offered to fix it. The investigation report partially blamed Santos-Dumont, who would have been told to close the crate, as well as suggesting that an assistant or Santos-Dumont himself could have destroyed the balloon. He abandoned the competition and returned to France. The competition was won by Augustus Knabenshue, in the California Arrow, identical to Santos-Dumont's No. 9.) On this trip, he also met the Wright brothers. No. 8 was a copy of No. 6 ordered by Edward Boyce, vice president of the Aeroclub of America, (Note: No. 8 served as the model for the first airship designed by an American. An October 1902 article in L'Aérophile says that the airship was made for George Francis Kerr, secretary of the New York Aeroclub, and was flown by Edward Boyce. Boyce also bought No. 9.) having made a single flight in New York; No. 9, with 261 cubic metres and 3 hp, was a travel airship, in which Santos-Dumont made several flights throughout 1903, (Note: A police report from 1903 indicated that Santos Dumont invested about 80,000 francs annually in his experiments.) including the first night flight of an airship on 24 June, and the last of these came on 14 July, when it took part in a military parade in commemoration of the 114th anniversary of the Storming of the Bastille. As he passed the President of the Republic, he fired 21 revolver shots into the air. The military considered the balloon to be a practical instrument for wartime. Santos-Dumont placed himself and his flotilla of three aircraft at the disposal of the government in the event of war, provided it was not against the nations of the Americas and that, "in the impossible event of war between France and Brazil," he considered himself obliged to support his motherland. The French military encouraged several industries to develop the technology proposed by Santos-Dumont.

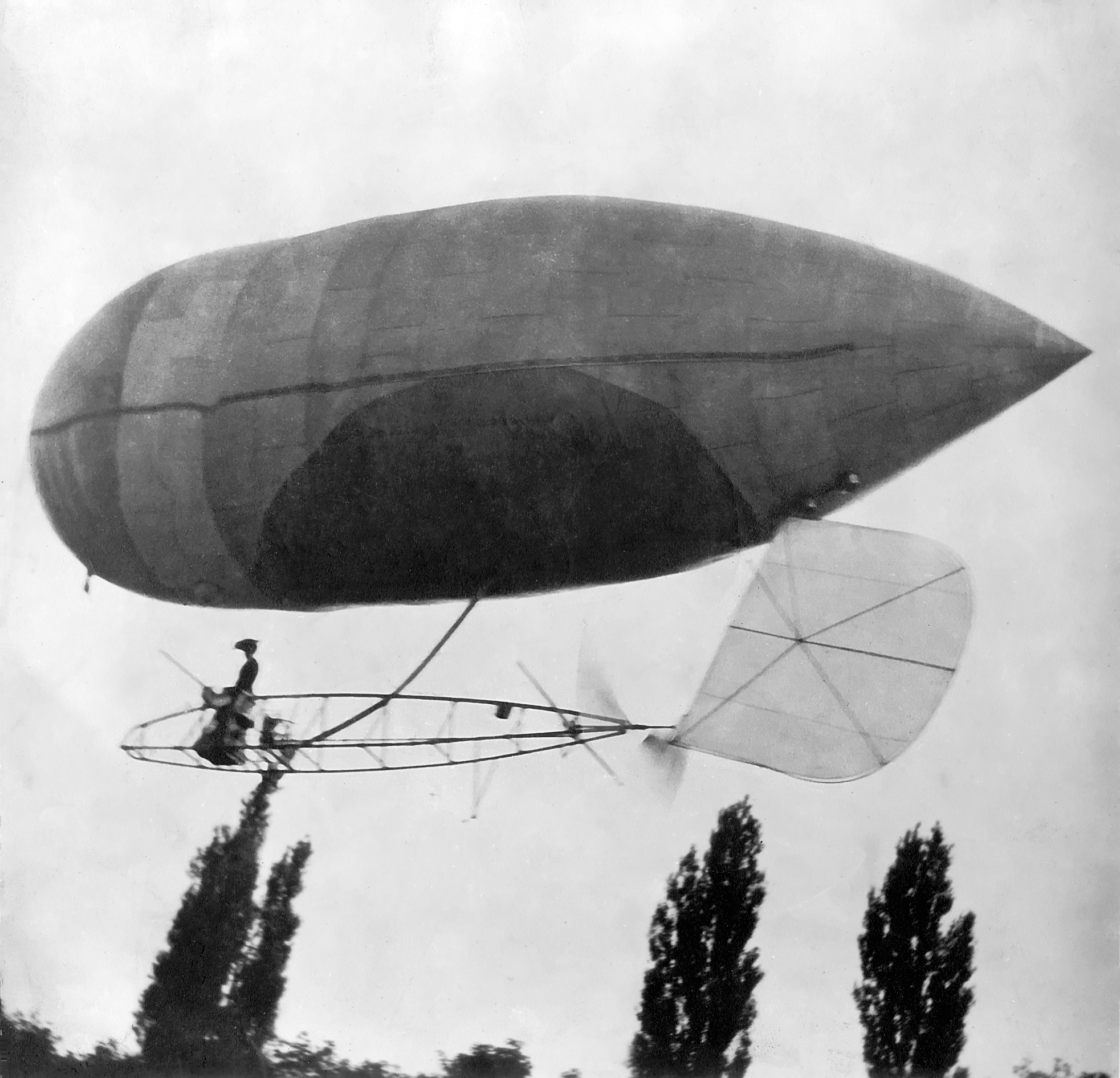
Aida de Acosta flying to a polo match in 1903

The first woman to fly an aircraft was Aida de Acosta, on 29 June 1903, in No. 9. The 11 August 1905 issue of La Vie au Grand Air describes the organisation of the second Coupe des Femmes Aéronautes and in the second half of 1906, the magazine Le Sport Universel Illustré reported that three years after the start of the Grand Prix of the Aéro-Club de France, seven countries were already participating in the competition.

No. 10, a 2,010 cubic metre airship with a 60 hp engine, was large enough to carry several people and serve as public transport. It made a few flights in October 1903, but was never completely finished; No. 11 was an unmanned monoplane. (Note: Dumont reportedly abandoned the monoplane in favour of a biplane due to the Voisin brothers' persuasion.) No. 12 was a helicopter never completed due to the technological limitations of the time and finally, No. 13, a luxurious double hot air and hydrogen balloon.

On his first return to Rio de Janeiro in 1903, a group of climbers put up a banner on Sugarloaf Mountain, beside Guanabara Bay, greeting the aviator on his return by ship from Europe. On 7 September 1903, he returned as a hero and met the President of Brazil, Rodrigues Alves, at the Catete Palace. When asked why he did not fly in Brazil, Santos-Dumont justified himself that it was because he could not "...count on the help of his mechanics, and much less on a hydrogen production plant like he had in France." He returned to Paris on 12 October. (Note: On his visit to Brazil, read O Cruzeiro, 9 de outubro de 1974, p. 54) In 1904 he was nominated as a Knight of the Legion of Honour of France, and published the work Dans L'Air, whose translation into Portuguese, Os Meus Balões (My Balloons), was published in Brazil in 1938.

=== Heavier-than-air flight ===
Footage of Santos-Dumont in the 21st second of a 1945 newsreel about the various human flight debuts, there are factual errors in the narration

In October 1904, three aviation prizes were founded in France: the Archdeacon Prize, the French Aeroclub Prize, and the Deutsch-Archdeacon Prize. The first, promoted by millionaire Ernest Archdeacon, would award 3,500 francs to anyone who flew 25 metres; the second, instituted by the French aeroclub, would award 1,500 francs ($300) to anyone who flew 100 metres; and the third, sponsored by Henri Deutsch de la Meurthe and Ernest Archdeacon, would award 1,500 francs to anyone who flew 1,000 metres.

With the exception of the Deutsch-Archdeacon Award, which prohibited the competing aircraft from using a balloon for launch, the other awards left the question of takeoff open. The flight could take place on flat or uneven terrain, in calm weather or wind – the French Aeroclub's Award required the flight to be into the wind – and the use of an engine was not mandatory. This allowed human-powered gliders and ornithopters to compete. It was required for all prizes that the race took place in France and under the supervision of an aeronautical commission convened no later than the evening of the previous day.

Very little of what was required was new. Inventors in other countries had already met or exceeded some of the required goals including 2-axis (pitch and roll) control of gliders. (Note: Henrique Lins de Barros' article says that the FAI did not consider that the claims of earlier flights (Ader, Lilienthal, Whitehead and Wrights) satisfied its criteria and that until 1905 there had been "...no actual flight of a heavier-than-air aircraft...". The United States did not come up with its definitions until December 1907. For other definitions, see Brandão 2018, p. 2. Barros & Barros 2006 raises the question of the definition of flight: if by flight one considers only movement through the air, then the Wrights take precedence. If the criteria of public test and unassisted takeoff are considered, then precedence lies with Santos-Dumont. They consider that the Demoiselle represented the "first modern airplane".) In Germany, Otto Lilienthal had made thousands of glider flights in the early 1890s, often reaching distances far greater than the 25 metres stipulated by the Archdeacon Prize. In the United States, German immigrant Gustave Whitehead had allegedly pioneered powered glide, though claims and eyewitness accounts remain controversial. The Wright brothers had simultaneously been making progress in developing surface-control gliders, at first using Lilienthal's foil concepts, then relying on their own wind tunnel data, and finally adding yaw control via a rudder, leading to the first 3-axis surface-controlled aeroplane in 1903. However, because their 12-horsepower engine could only provide two-thirds of the thrust required for takeoff on a rail of practical size, their takeoffs were aided by headwinds near Kitty Hawk and a catapult in Ohio, and without any official observers. Lilienthal's death due to a stall led the Wright brothers to place the elevator in front, which helped prevent stalls but made stable flight difficult until the Wrights modified the design; the 3-axis surface control (pitch, yaw and roll) pioneered by the Wrights was also adopted by other inventors including Santos-Dumont and remains the standard airplane control configuration. (Note: The canard configuration has been rediscovered in modern aircraft such as Gripen, Rafale, Eurofighter Typhoon and Sukhoi-35 because it is now possible to maintain rapid stability control.)

==== Glider and helicopter ====
Having already accumulated technical knowledge, mainly concerning engines, in early 1905, Santos-Dumont built a model glider, No. 11, inspired by a self-stabilising prototype made 100 years earlier by English scientist George Cayley, considered to be the first aeroplane in history: the model, 1.5 metres long by 1.2 metres wide, had fixed wings, a cruciform tail and a movable weight to adjust the centre of gravity. Santos-Dumont's glider differed from Cayley's in size, wing profile, and the fact that it had no movable weight. The project was abandoned due to poor stability. An article by Georges Blanchet published in April 1904 diverges from the description of the No. 11 as a model aeroplane by presenting it as a dirigible balloon capable of carrying five people and a 34-metre-long envelope, being purchased by an American.

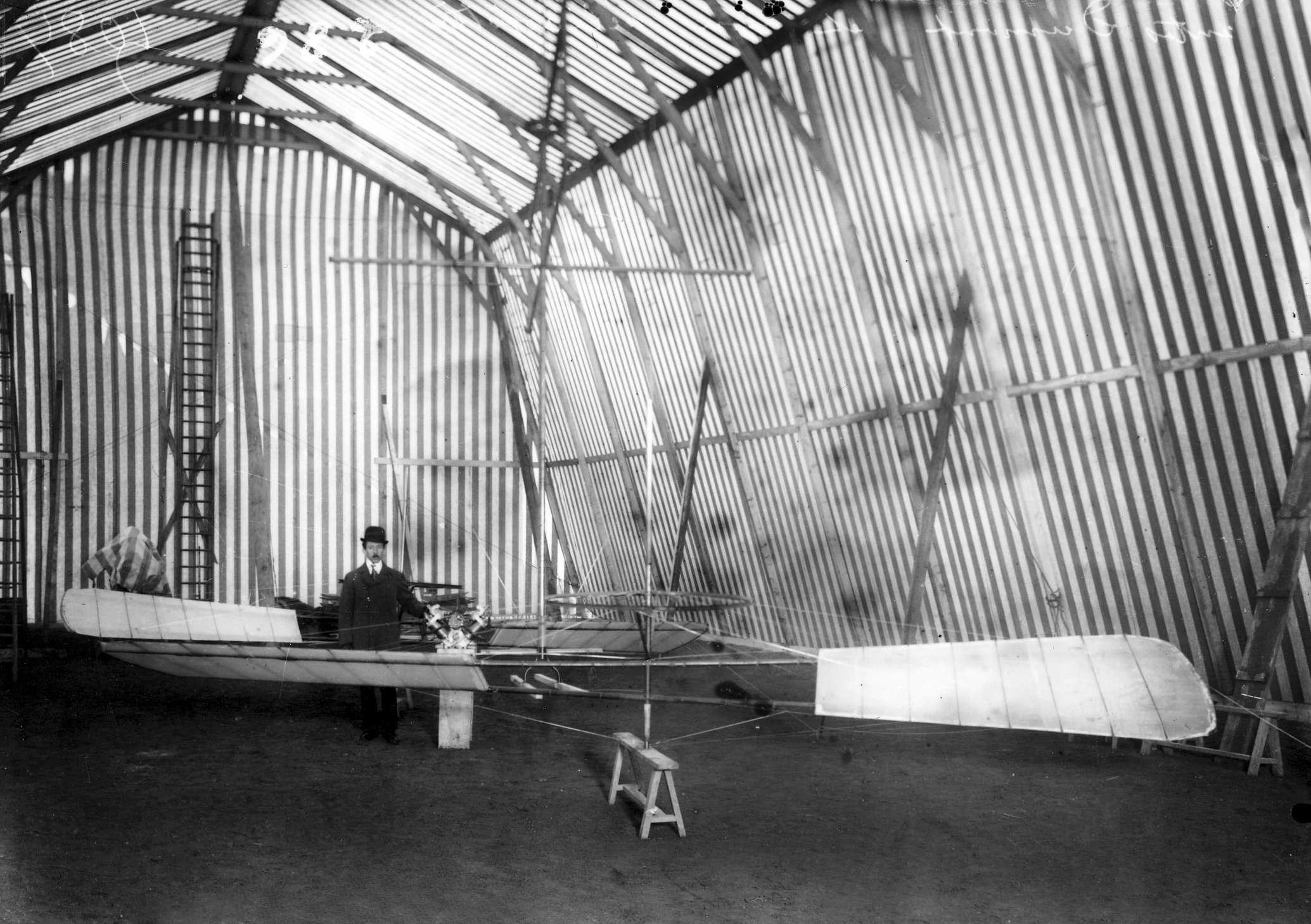
No. 12 (helicopter) under construction

The first experiment, conducted on 13 May at the Aeroclub de France, was made by the Dufaux brothers with a prototype helicopter. The model, weighing 17 kilograms and with a 3 hp engine, repeatedly soared to the roof of the air club's porch, raising clouds of dust. It had been demonstrated that heavier, larger aircraft could be lifted by their own means. The second experiment was made on 8 June on the Seine: Gabriel Voisin went up in the hydroplane Archdeacon, towed by a speedboat piloted by Alphonse Tellier, La Rapière. The device barely rose out of the water and the project was abandoned due to poor stability. Watching tests like this, Santos-Dumont realised that the Antoinette engine from the tugboat could be used in an aeroplane, giving the concept of the 14-bis. (Note: Gabriel Voisin's test indicated that an engine of at least 50 hp would be required for takeoff.)

He began to study the two solutions for heavier-than-air flight. On 3 January 1906, he entered the Deutsch-Archdeacon Prize, and before that he had begun building a helicopter, the No. 12, but gave up on it on 1 June because it was impossible to create a light, powerful engine. Between 12 June and 25 August 1905, he tested the No. 14 airship, which flew in two versions (14-a and 14-b): the first was 41 metres long, 3.4 in diameter and 186 cubic metres, with a 14 hp engine, and the second was 20 metres long, 6 in diameter and with a 16 hp engine.

==== Olympic diploma, 1905 ====
On 13 June 1905, represented by the Italian Count Eugenio Brunetta d'Usseaux, Baron Pierre de Coubertin awarded Santos-Dumont the Olympic Diploma No. 3 for "...representing the Olympic ideal..." according to Coubertin, who was also received by Theodore Roosevelt, Fridtjof Nansen and William-Hippolyte Grenfell. De Coubertin considered aviation a sport; Santos-Dumont was described as a sportsman in FAI Bulletins and the Paris Sport of 15 July 1901 described the Brazilian as "a true sportsman in every sense of the word." Santos-Dumont was already famous at that time and already a hero in his country. Santos' diploma was passed to the Brazilian ambassador in Belgium, who then passed it on to the aviator, according to the 21 June 1905 edition of the Correio Paulistano. Santos-Dumont was not the only one represented by others at the ceremony and only William Grenfell received the diploma personally. The FAI was created on 14 October 1905, along the lines of the International Olympic Committee.

==== 14-bis ====
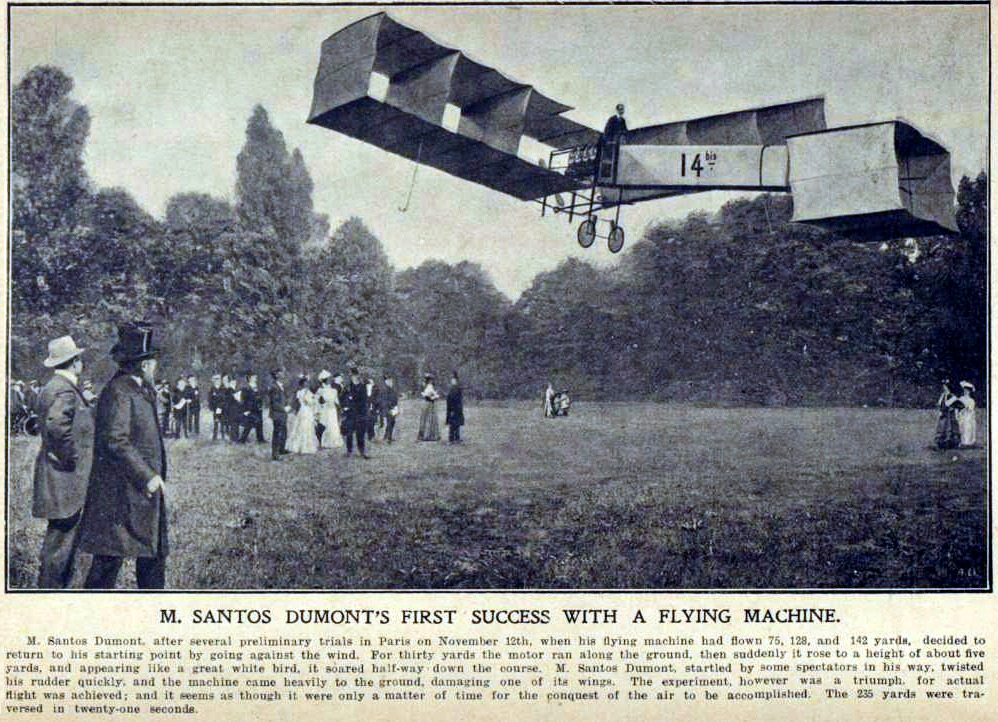
Illustration of the 14-bis flight on 12 November 1906, which earned Santos-Dumont the French Aeroclub Award

14-bis pulled by a donkey during tests

In 1906 Santos-Dumont built a hybrid machine, the 14-bis or Oiseau de Proie, consolidating his studies of what had been done in aviation until then, (Note: Like the canard configuration, Hargrave cells and an appropriate engine. Jornal do Commercio even reported in early 1906 that the helicopter and the airplane were developed simultaneously, because Santos Dumont wanted to compare the efficiency of both systems and the same newspaper even announced that Santos Dumont had entered the new prize with the "Santos-Helicopter," aiming to experiment with both aircraft.) without having had experience with gliders. By mid-year, within two months of starting, he completed an aeroplane attached to a hydrogen balloon to assist takeoff. (Note: Mattos 2012, says that with this Santos-Dumont invented the flight test. The image of the 14-bis attached to the balloon is used as a symbol for experimental flight activities by the Brazilian Air Force, who consider Santos-Dumont to be a test pilot.) On 18 July, after completing the 14-bis, Santos-Dumont signed up for a competition and presented the aircraft for the first time the next day. (Note: Barros 2021 says that the first experiments of the 14-bis attached to the balloon took place on 23 July. Barros & Barros 2006 give the period 18–23 June 1906.) at Bagatelle, achieving some short hops. (Note: About his project, Santos-Dumont reported: "I slept for three years and in the month of July 1906 I presented myself on the Bagatelle field with my first apparatus... The question of the airplane had been on the agenda for some years, but I never took part in the discussions, because I have always believed that the inventor must work in silence; extraneous opinions never produce anything good". At first he put in a 25 hp engine, but soon switched to a 50 hp Levavaseur and also changed the landing gear from three wheels to two.) Excited, he decided to apply for the Archdeacon and Aeroclub of France awards the following day, his 33rd birthday, but was discouraged by Captain Ferdinand Ferber, another aviation enthusiast. Ferber had attended the demonstrations and did not like the solution presented by Santos-Dumont; he considered the hybrid an impure machine. "Aviation must be solved by aviation!" he declared.

==== Oiseau de Proie I ====
Santos-Dumont decided not to compete for the prizes with the hybrid, but on 20 July signed up for the tests and over the next three days continued to test the plane tethered to the balloon, to practise steering. Throughout the tests he realised that, although the balloon helped take-off, it made flight difficult as the drag generated was too great. The airship was discarded, and the biplane received the name Oiseau de Proie ("Bird of Prey") from the press. The Oiseau de Proie had been inspired by the hydroplane tested by Voisin. Like the water glider, the invention also consisted of a cellular biplane based on the structure created in 1893 by Australian researcher Lawrence Hargrave, which offered good support and rigidity. The plane was 4 metres high, 10 metres long, and had a span of 12 metres, with a wing area of 50 square metres. Its mass was 205 kilograms. The wings were attached to a beam, in front of which lay the rudder, consisting of a cell identical to those of the wings. At the rear end was the propeller, powered by a 24 hp Levavasseur engine. The landing gear had two wheels, and the pilot stood upright. The 23 September 1906 issue of Le Sport Universel Illustré published the technical details of the 14-bis.

On 29 July, using a donkey and a system of cables, Santos-Dumont hoisted the Oiseau de Proie to the top of a tower 13 metres high (2 metres were stuck in the ground), installed a few days earlier on his property in Neuilly. This frame was very similar to the one Ferber had used at Chalais-Meudon for the May 1905 experiments with the 6-bis. The plane, suspended on a movable hook connected to an inclined steel wire, glided without a propeller 60 metres from the top of the tower to a smaller one, only six metres long, on the Boulevard de la Seine. This allowed Santos-Dumont to get a feel for the aeroplane and to study its centre of gravity. In August the 14-bis was unsuccessful in trying to take off because the 24-hp engine was not powerful enough. On 13 September, the 14-bis made a 7 to 13-metre test flight with a 50 hp Antoinette engine, at 8:40 a.m, which ended in an accident that damaged the propeller and landing gear, but that was praised by La Nature magazine. On 30 September he interrupted the tests of the 14-bis to compete in the Gordon Bennett Cup with the Deux Amériques balloon. He abandoned it after an accident, having flown 134 kilometres in 6 hours and 20 minutes. The accident occurred while attempting a manoeuvre that caused the engine gear to fracture his arm.

==== Oiseau de Proie II ====
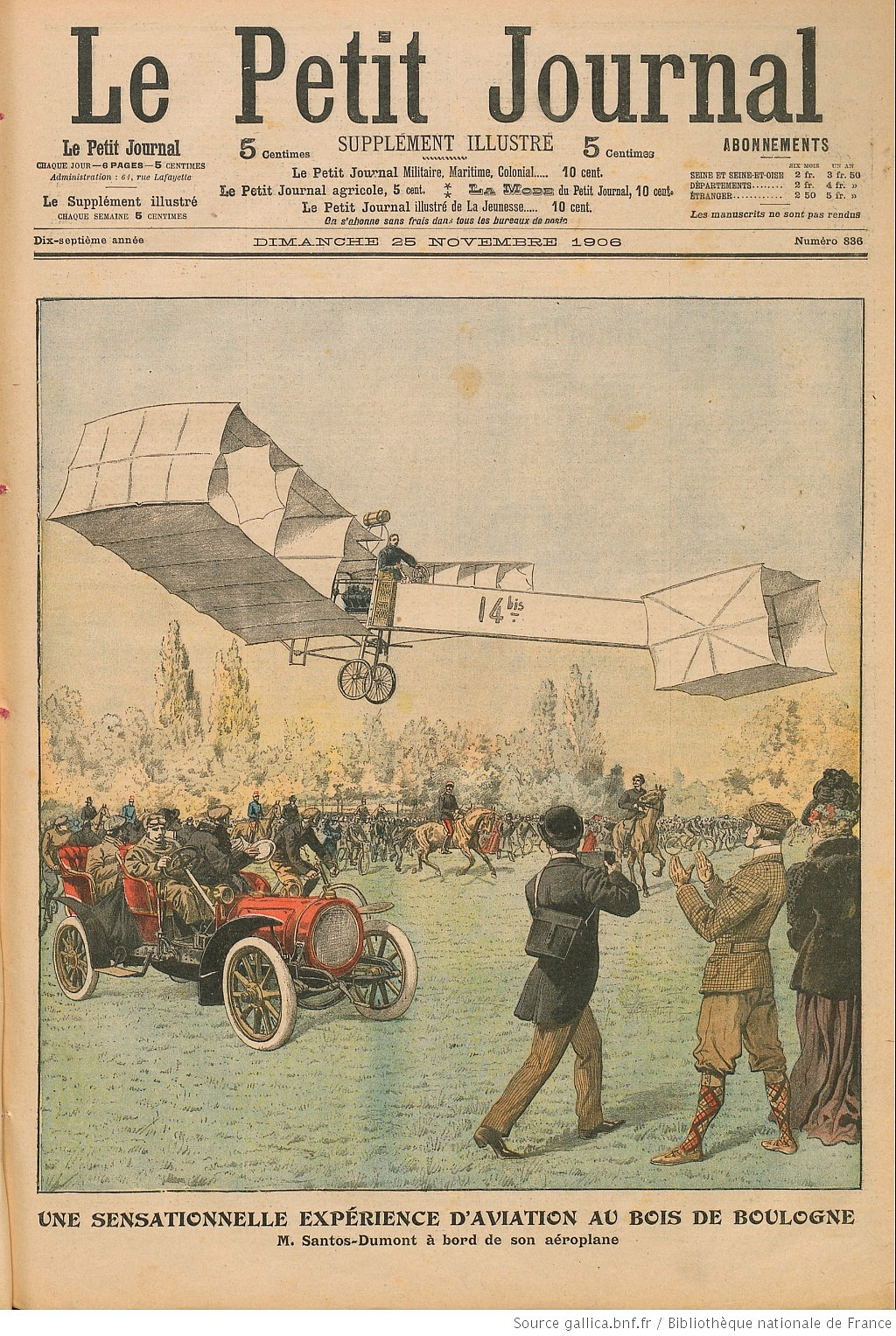
The flight of the Oiseau de Proie III shown on the cover of Le Petit Journal, 25 November

On 23 October, Santos-Dumont presented himself at Bagatelle with the Oiseau de Proie II, a modification of the original model. The plane had been varnished to reduce the porosity of the fabric and increase lift. The rear wheel had been removed. In the morning he limited himself to manoeuvring the aircraft across the field, until the propeller shaft broke. It was repaired in the afternoon, and the plane was moved into position for an official attempt. An expectant crowd was present. At 4:45 pm, Santos-Dumont started the engine. The plane lifted off and flew for 60 metres, without taking advantage of headwinds, ramps, catapults, slopes, or other devices. The flight had taken place solely by the aircraft's own means, and Europeans at the time believed it was the first such achievement.

The crowd celebrated, ran up to the pilot and carried him off in triumph. The judges had been overcome with emotion and forgot to time and track the flight, and due to this the record was not made official. Brandão 2018 says that because the Aeroclub Committee was partially present, a new test was scheduled for 12 November.

I struggled at first with the greatest difficulties to achieve complete obedience of the airplane. It was like shooting an arrow with the tail forward. On my first flight, after sixty meters, I lost direction and crashed... I didn't stay in the air any longer, not because of the machine's fault, but exclusively my own.

— Santos-Dumont.

==== Oiseau de Proie III ====
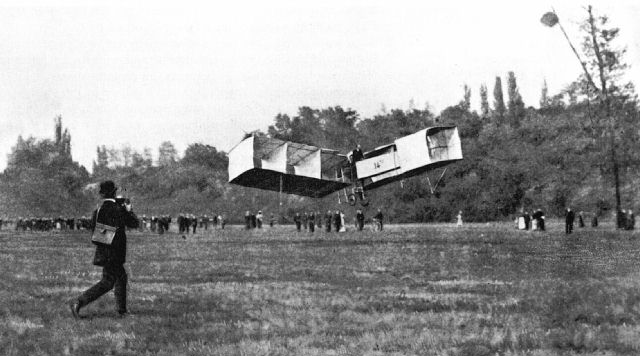
12 November 1906 flight

The aeroplane was still experimental. To compete for the French Aeroclub's prize, Santos-Dumont inserted two octagonal surfaces (rudimentary ailerons) between the wings for better steering control and created the Oiseau de Proie III. Santos-Dumont was a pioneer in implementing ailerons in his aircraft. (Note: In 1906 the Wright brothers were granted a patent for wing-warping, which provided control equivalent to ailerons, and they subsequently sued Glenn Curtiss and European aviators for patent infringement. In France, Henri Farman claimed to have created this technology.)

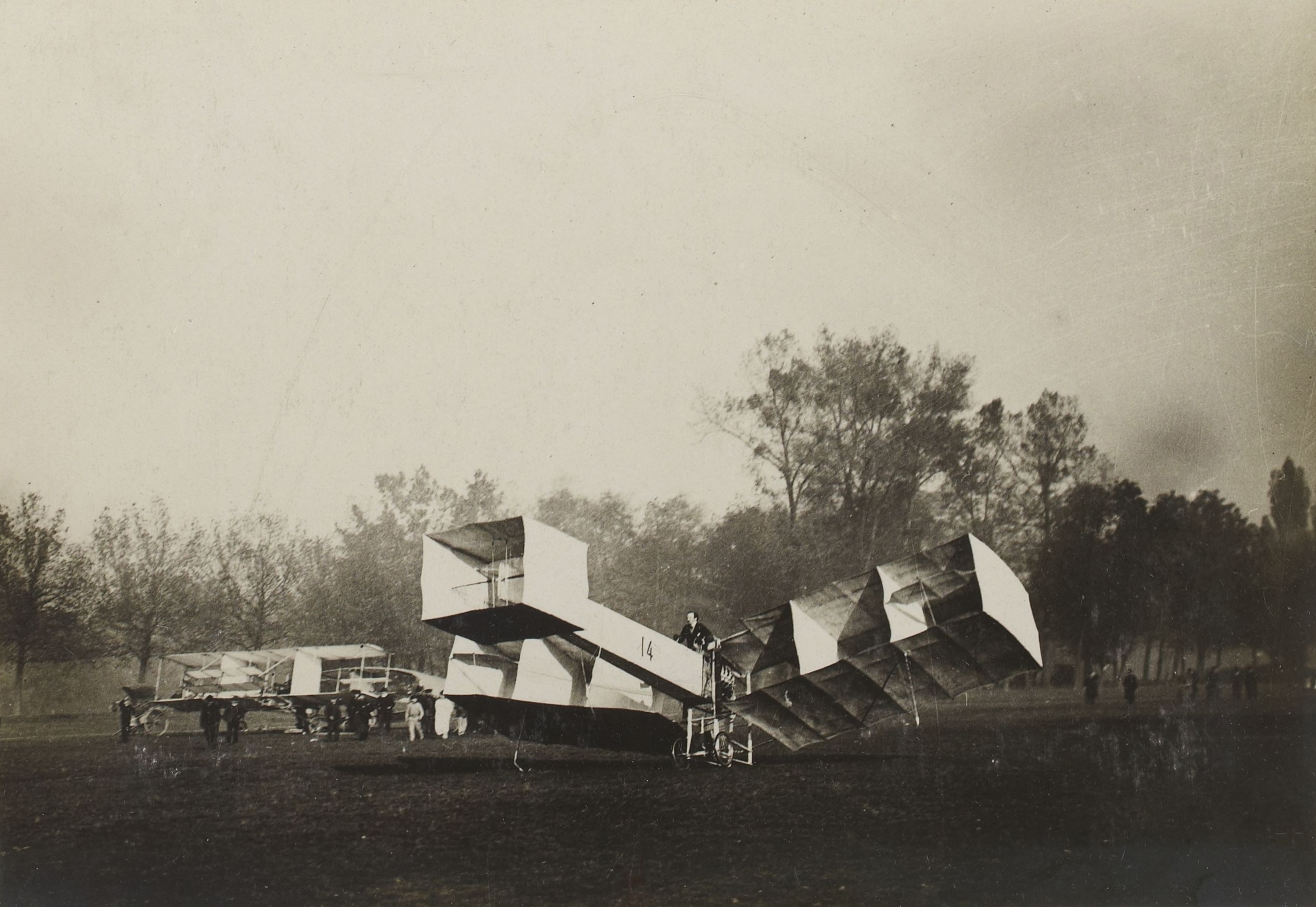
The 14-bis in its final form in late November 1906, with octagonal interplane ailerons at the far ends of the wings.

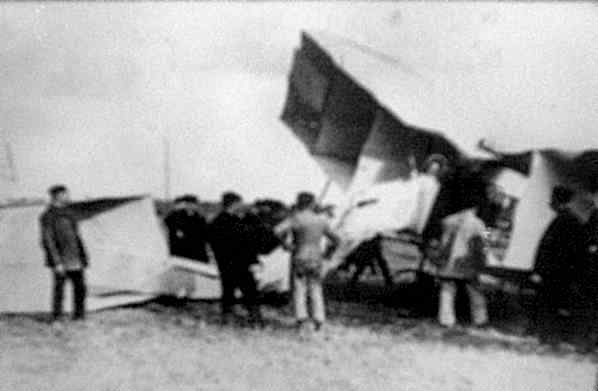
14-bis after its crash, 1907

Santos-Dumont competed for the award on 12 November 1906, again in Bagatelle. He did five (Note: Or four. Or six.) public flights that day: one at 10 am, of 40 metres; two others at 10:25 am, of 40 and 60 metres, when the axle of the right wheel broke. The damage was repaired during lunch and Santos-Dumont resumed at 4:09 pm. He covered 82.60 metres, surpassing the feat of 23 October and reaching 41.3 km/h. At 4:45 pm, with the day ending, he took off against the wind and flew 220 metres, for 21 seconds at an average speed of 37.4 km/h, winning the French Aeroclub Award. (Note: The prize of 1,600 francs was donated to his mechanics.) These were the first aeroplane flights recorded by a film company, Pathé. The Wright brothers, after learning of the 12 November experiment, sent a letter to Captain Ferdinand Ferber asking for "exact news of the Bagatelle experiments," including "a faithful report of the trials and a description of the flying machine, accompanied by a schematic". (Note: Ferber had been communicating with the Wrights since 1901, made an unsuccessful motorised copy of one of their gliders two years later, and published the letters he received from them in December 1905 as a way to get the French Army to buy their equipment, but most of France's aeronautical community did not believe that the Americans had succeeded in creating the aeroplane.) Santos-Dumont even adopted the configuration proposed by the Wright brothers and placed the rudder at the front of the 14-bis, which he described as "the same as trying to shoot an arrow forward with the tail...". To test the idea that the rudder at the rear increased the angle of incidence of the wings, Santos-Dumont built a new aircraft, without abandoning the 14-bis, and tested it in March 1907, without taking off as the primitive landing gear did not allow it.

==== Oiseau de Proie IV ====
He returned to the 14-bis having made other changes to the aircraft after 12 November, and on 4 April 1907, at Saint-Cyr, the aircraft flew for 50 metres, oscillated, crashed, and was torn to pieces. The project was abandoned.

==== New aeroplanes ====
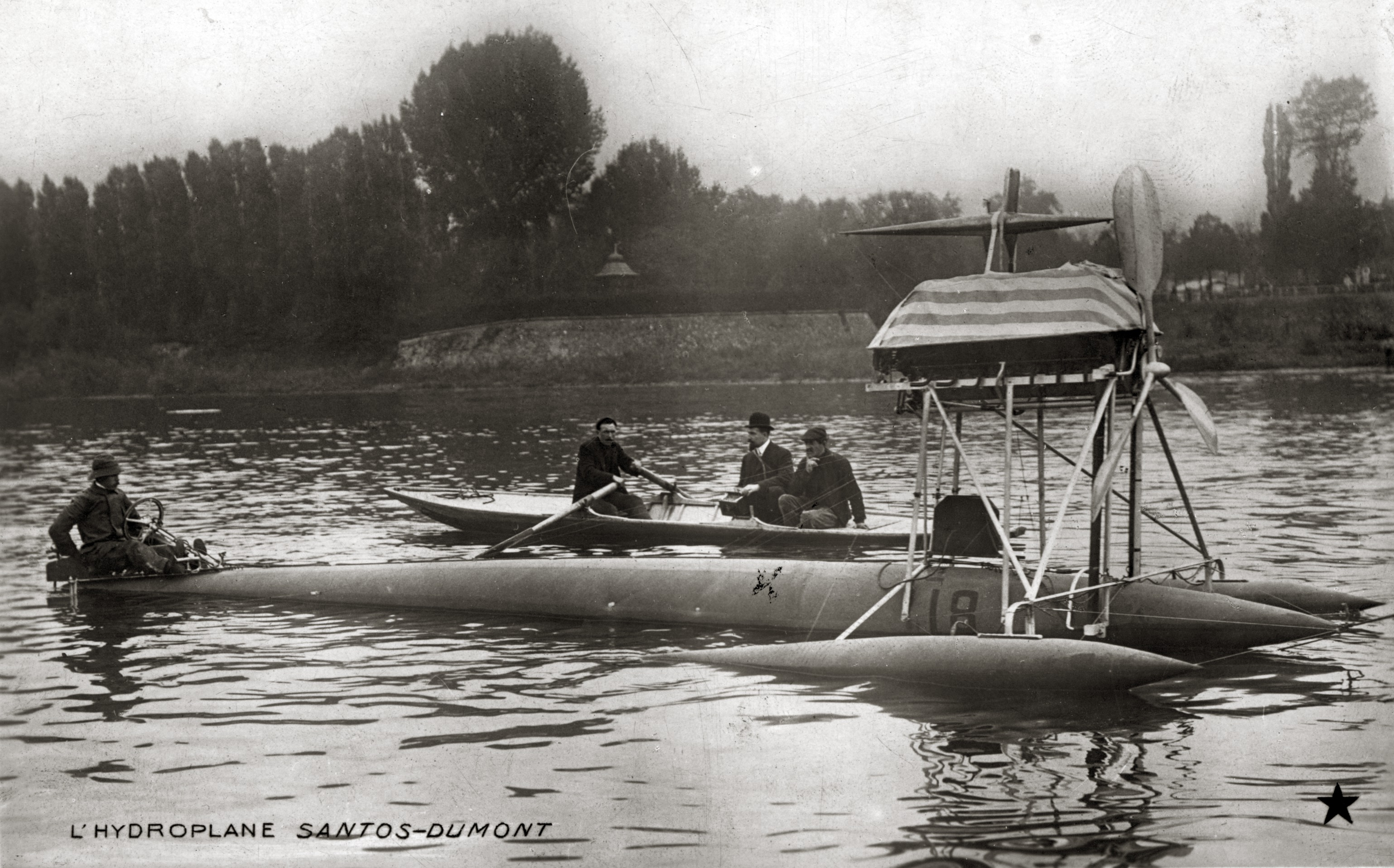
Santos-Dumont No. 18

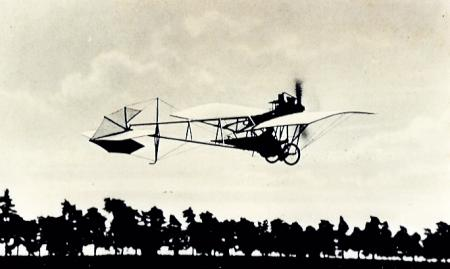
The Demoiselle in flight

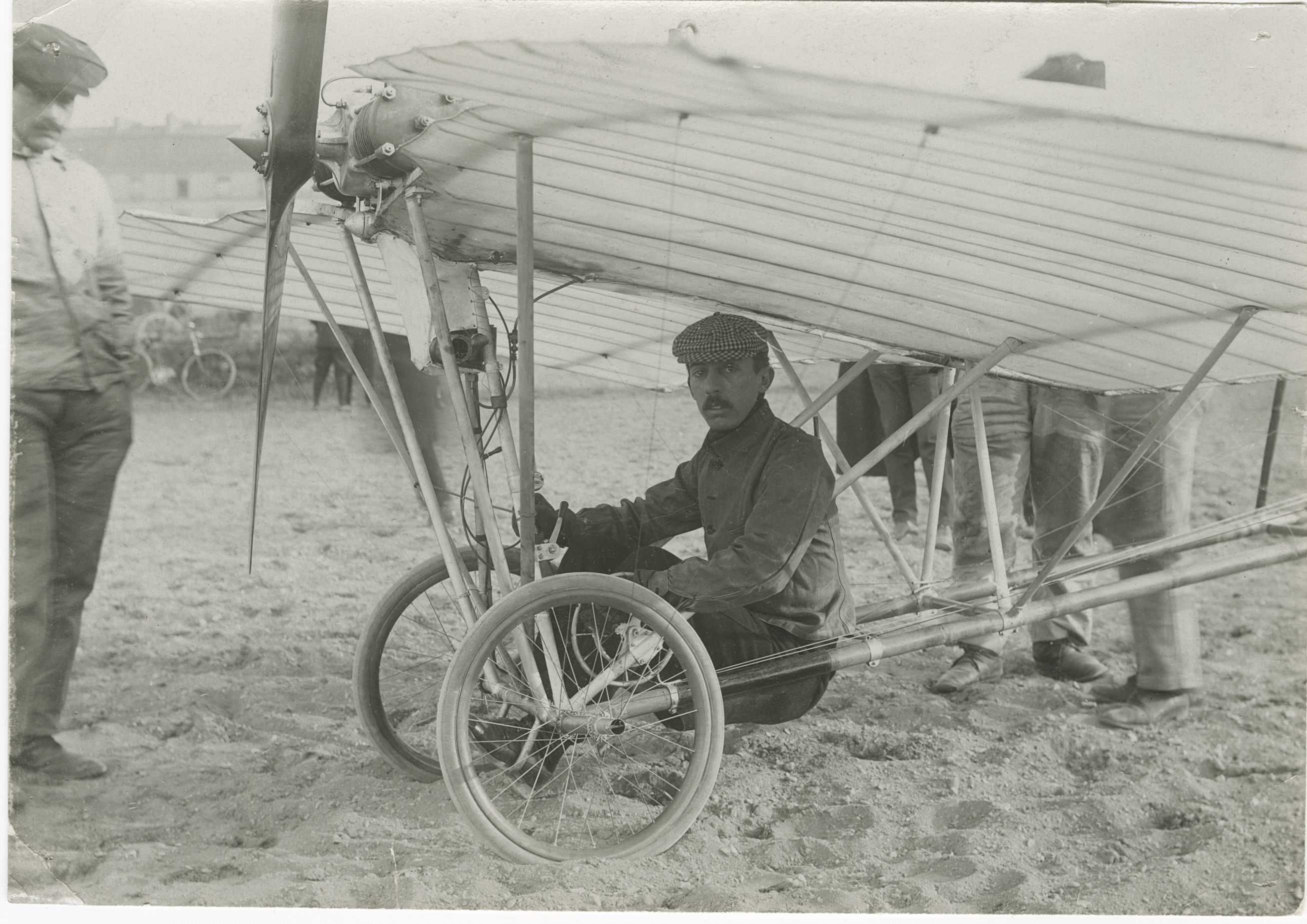
Santos-Dumont in 1910

He also made the No. 15, a biplane with a rear-mounted rudder, as opposed to the canard format, the No. 16, a mix of airship and aeroplane, (Note: No. 16 was designed with passenger transport in mind, something that became a reality through DELAG.) No. 17 and No. 18, a waterslide (Note: No. 15 and 16 were unsuccessful and No. 17 would not have been tested. Barros 2021 explicitly says that these inventions were abandoned before testing them. Barros & Barros 2006 says that No. 17 was destroyed while trying to take off.) used to test the wing shape underwater.

Dissatisfied with numbers 15 to 18, he made a new series, smaller in size and more refined, like the Demoiselle, that was capable of reaching up to 90 kilometres per hour. (Note: Barros & Barros 2006 declares the Demoiselle to be the first practical aeroplane in the world which used Cayley's configuration: "...a monoplane with a cruciform tail at the end of a long tubular fuselage." and that the No. 19 should be considered as "the first modern airplane".) It was first tested in November 1907, returning on an abandoned idea from 1905, but soon realised that it "... had serious structural problems" according to Henrique Lins de Barros. However, on 17 November 1907, he competed for the Deutsch-Archdeacon award, crossing 200 meters at a height of 6 meters, but abandoning before the required 1000 meters due to a breakdown in the aircraft.

In 1909 he presented the Demoiselle No. 20, improved and considered "the first ultralight in history". (Note: In January 1909 he received his first brevet from the Aéro-Club de France. The other aeroplanes built at the time used the concept of the Demoiselle in some way, whether its configuration or stability; the Demoiselle itself was inspired by the configuration of the Ariel, patented in 1842.) This aeroplane was designed for sports competitions and 300 were built in several European countries and in the United States. His schemes were published in the June–July 1910 issues of Popular Mechanics. This plane consolidated Santos-Dumont's role in the birth of aviation in the 20th century. (Note: Barros 2006a: "He divulged the blueprints of the aircraft and was happy to see that successive versions of his Demoiselle, manufactured in various countries from his specifications, were incorporating improvements by the builders, which represented, to him, the best spirit of aeronautical research.") The Demoiselle also featured an engine of original invention by Santos-Dumont (Note: An opposed cylinder engine, whose cooling sulution was patented by Santos-Dumont. The Demoiselle with a two-cylinder engine became very popular. When the Darracq company tried to claim the engine design, Santos Dumont went to court to get his project released into the public domain.) and model No. 20, capable of flights of up to 2 kilometres and reaching 96 km/h, (Note: On 16 September 1909 Santos-Dumont achieved a speed record of 96 km/h (60 mph). The Demoiselle could reach over 100 km/h, with which he made the first crossing in the country, between Saint Cyr of the Buc, with stops every 8 kilometres.) Because of the aircraft's low cost and high safety, it was used for pilot training during World War I.

The aircraft is on permanent display at the Musée de l'air et de l'espace near Paris. In 1908, when the Wright brothers went public, and – according to Mattos – used European technology (Note: According to Mattos, Wilbur Wright's first flights in August 1908 did not impress the European community and only improved after using old world technology in their aircraft (Mattos may be referring to motors built for the Wrights in Europe). Other historians have noted that observers instantly showered Wilbur with praise for his fully-controlled flights, and that his flights in France and Orville's in the US made the brothers world famous. Pioneer French aviator Léon Delagrange, a witness, said of Wilbur's flights, "Nous sommes battus." ("We are beaten.")) and his colleagues were already being rewarded, he already seemed to have moved away from the events.

== Last years ==
Santos-Dumont began to show symptoms of multiple sclerosis. He aged in appearance and felt too tired to continue competing with new inventors in races. On 22 August 1909 he attended the Great Aviation Week in Reims, where he made his last flights. After an accident with the Demoiselle on 4 January 1910, he closed down his workshop and withdrew from social life. (Note: Barros 2021 says that Santos-Dumont sold a Demoiselle to Roland Garros in 1910.) He continued to work on popularising aviation. On 12 November 1910 a monument was unveiled in Bagatelle, and on 4 October 1913, the Icarus monument was unveiled, celebrating his winning the Deutsch Prize, made by sculptor Georges Colin. On the same day he was promoted to Commander of the Legion of Honour and soon after these events he returned to Brazil after a 10-year absence, returning to France the following year. He ordered a new Demoiselle in 1913, but there is no evidence that he ever flew it.

In August 1914, World War I began, and Santos-Dumont offered his services to the French Ministry of War. He went on to enlist as a chauffeur. Aeroplanes began to be used in warfare, first for observation of enemy troops, and then in aerial combat. The combats became more violent, with the use of machine guns and bombs. Santos-Dumont saw his dream turn into a nightmare.

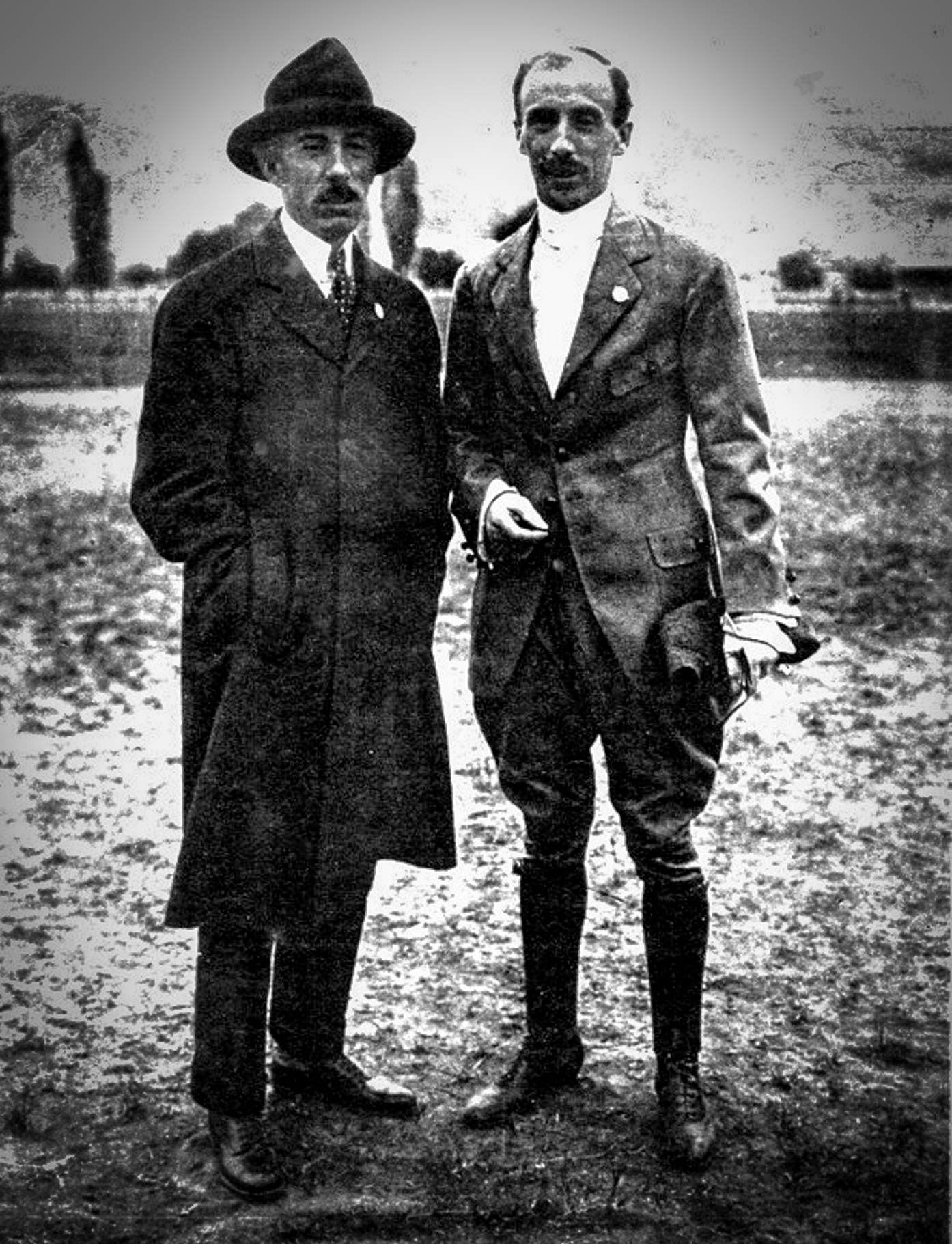
Santos-Dumont in 1916 with another aviation pioneer, the Argentinean Eduardo Bradley

Santos-Dumont now devoted himself to the study of astronomy, residing in Trouville, near the sea. For this he used several observation devices, with which his neighbours thought he was spying for the Germans. He was arrested on this charge. After the incident was cleared up, the French government apologised. This made him feel depressed, considering that he had offered his help to the military, and he destroyed all his aeronautical documents.

In 1915, his health worsened and he decided to return to Brazil. That year, he took part in the 11th Pan-American Scientific Congress in the United States, dealing with the theme of the use of aeroplanes to improve relationships between the countries of the Americas. (Note: At this meeting he was elected as an honorary member of the Aeroclub of America.) In his speech he showed concern about the efficiency of the aeroplane as a weapon of war, but advocated the creation of a squadron for coastal defence with the words, "Who knows when a European power will threaten an American state?" Because of its pacifism, this position can be viewed in a surprising way. In the afterword to the historical novel O Homem com Asas ("De gevleugelde"), Arthur Japin says that when Santos-Dumont returned to Brazil, he "burned all his diaries, letters and drawings". In 1916, he was the Honorary President of the 1st Pan-American Aronautics Conference in Chile, which aimed to create an Aeronautical Federation with all the Americas, where, while representing the Aeroclub of America, he advocated the peaceful use of the aeroplane. When he returned to Brazil, passing through Paraná, he suggested the creation of the Iguaçu National Park.

In the book O Que Eu Vi, O Que Nós Veremos, Santos-Dumont transcribed his letters of 1917 to the President of the Republic of Brazil, stressing the need to build military airfields for the Army and the Navy. He also pointed out that Brazil was falling behind Europe, the United States and even Argentina and Chile. The book also argues for the need to train people in aeronautics, and to make the country technologically independent.

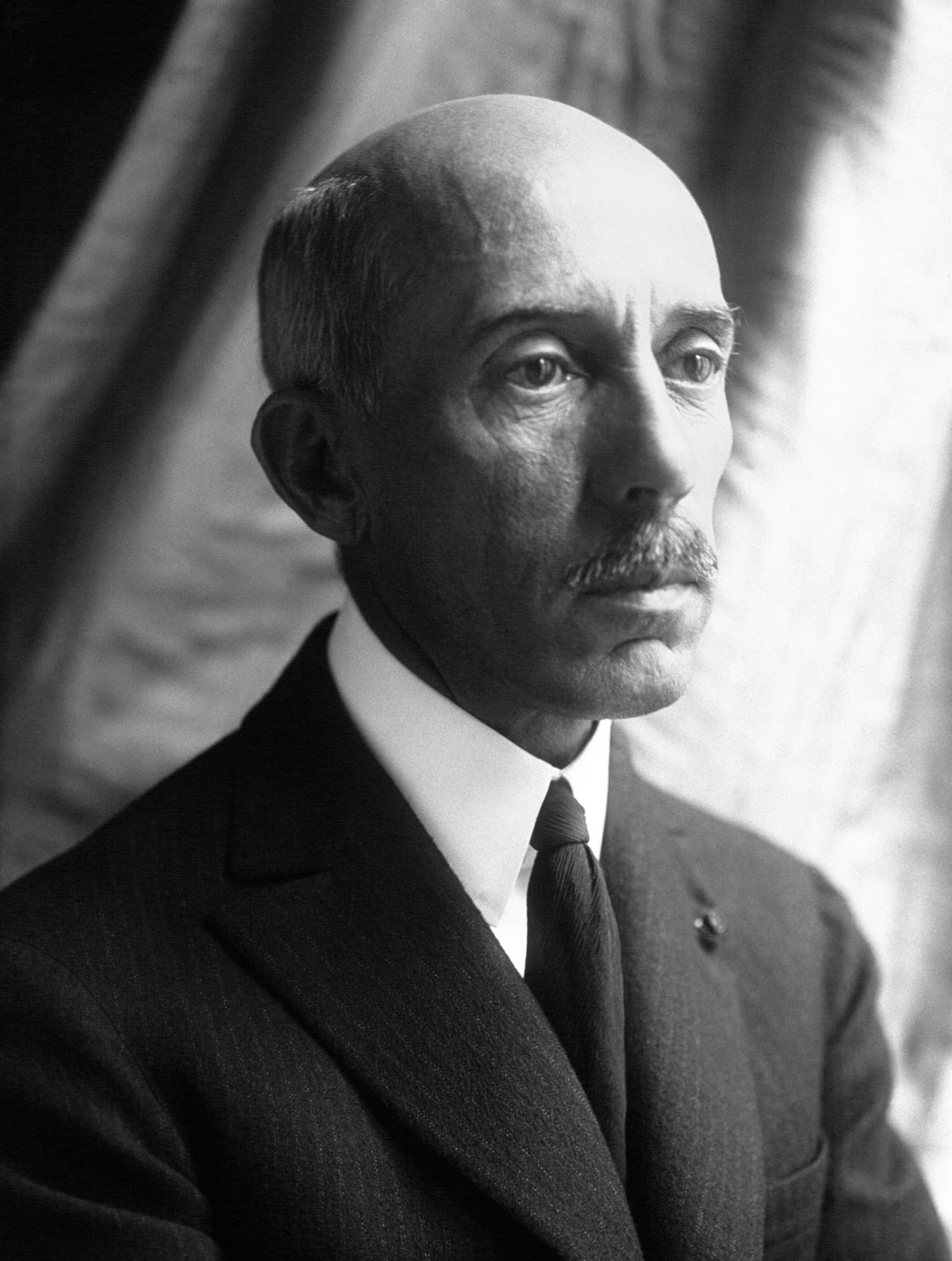
Santos-Dumont in 1922

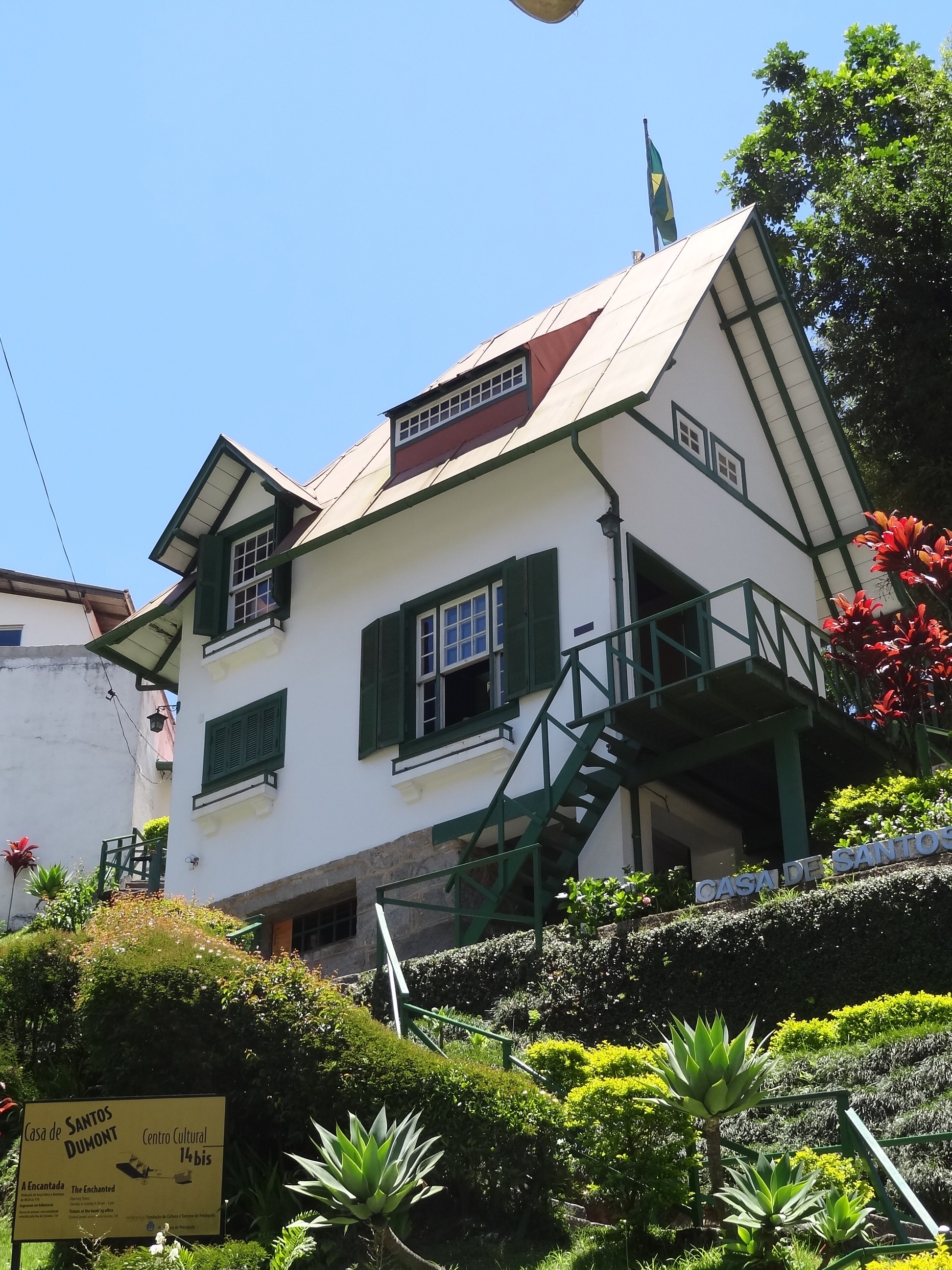
A Encantada, Santos-Dumont's chalet in Petrópolis, Rio de Janeiro

In 1918 Santos-Dumont bought a small plot of land on the side of a hill in Petrópolis in the Serra Fluminense mountains, and built a small house there filled with mechanical devices, including an alcohol-heated shower of his own design. The hill was chosen because of its steep slope, as proof that ingenuity could make it possible to build a comfortable home in that unlikely location. After he built it in land given by the government, he spent summers there to escape the heat of Rio de Janeiro, calling it "The Enchanted" because of the Rua do Encanto. The steps of the outside stairs are dug alternately to the right and left, to allow people to climb up comfortably. The house is now a museum. In 1918 he wrote his second work, O que eu vi, o que nós veremos in this house. In 1919 he got the United States Minister in Brazil to contact the Assistant Secretary of the Navy Franklin D. Roosevelt, as a way to "lobby" for more aeronautical cooperation between Brazil and the US.

In 1920, Santos-Dumont had a tomb erected for his parents and himself in the São João Batista Cemetery in Rio de Janeiro. The tomb is a replica of Saint-Cloud's Icarus. Also in 1920, he began an international campaign against the warlike use of aircraft, but without success.

In 1922, he decorated Anésia Pinheiro Machado, who, during the commemorations of the centenary of Brazil's independence, made the trip from Rio de Janeiro to São Paulo in an aeroplane. On 14 May he made his last balloon ascent. Also in 1922 he visited friends in France. He spent time in Paris, Petrópolis and Cabangu Farm, in his home town.

On 23 April 1923 he went to Portugal to collect his mother's remains. On 7 June he was awarded the Comendador of Military Order of Saint James of the Sword, in Portugal. On 21 August, he started the construction of his parents' tomb, where a replica of the Icarus of Saint Cloud offered by the French Government was placed, and he carried out the transfer of his parents' remains on 23 October. Beside his parents' graves, Santos-Dumont personally dug his own.

On 6 November 1924, he was elected Grand Officer of the Order of Leopold II. On 25 January 1925, Santos tried to improve his health with thermal waters containing radium, but was unsuccessful. In March, in a letter, Santos-Dumont described himself as being "extremely thin, like a skeleton". In a letter dated 29 April he complained of noises in his ear. In July, he was hospitalised in Switzerland.

Santos-Dumont's speech in French when being decorated in 1930

In January 1926, he appealed to the League of Nations, through his friend and ambassador Afrânio de Melo Franco, to stop the use of aeroplanes as weapons of war. He offered ten thousand francs to whoever wrote the best piece against the military use of aeroplanes. Santos-Dumont was the first aeronaut to speak out against the warlike use of the aeroplane. In the same year he wrote to Senator Paulo de Frontin refusing a third-party proposal to make him a general.

In May 1927, he was invited by the Aeroclub of France to preside over the banquet in honour of Charles Lindbergh for his crossing of the Atlantic Ocean, but he declined due to his health. He spent some time convalescing in Glion, Switzerland, and then returned to France. Researcher Henrique Lins de Barros describes that "around 1925, he gradually enters a state of almost permanent depression."

On 3 December 1928 he returned to Brazil on the ship Capitão Arcona. The city of Rio de Janeiro received him with honour. A seaplane carrying several professors from the Escola Politécnica, from the Condor Syndikat company, baptised with his name, crashed, with no survivors, while flying over Santos-Dumont's ship. After this event, he locked himself in the Copacabana Palace and only came out to attend the funerals. On 10 June 1930, he was decorated by the Aeroclub of France with the title of Grand Officer of the French Legion of Honour. His speech was recorded on a sound film.

== Death ==
Santos-Dumont's death certificate

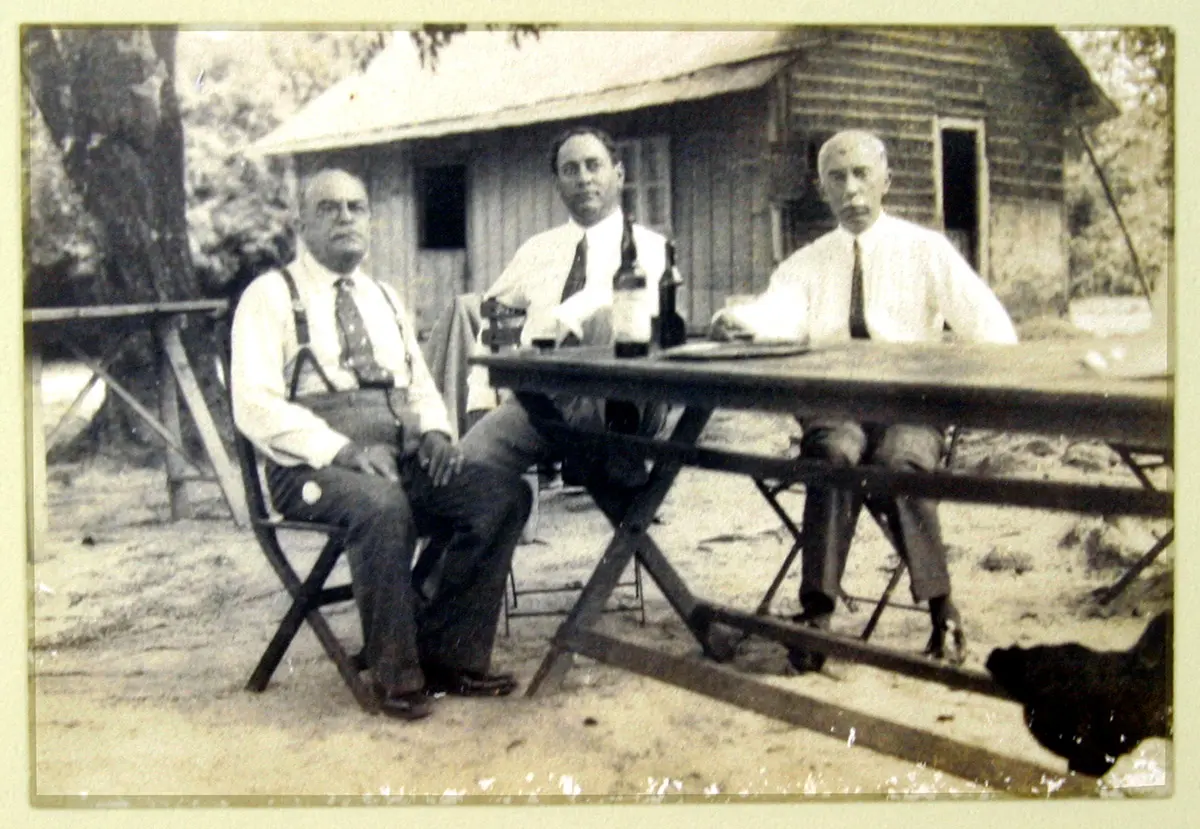
Last photo of Santos-Dumont (right), next to Jorge Dumont and João Fonseca

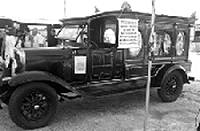
Hearse that transported the body of Santos-Dumont in Guarujá, São Paulo

On 28 October 1930, Santos-Dumont was hospitalised in France, and on 14 April 1931 he wrote his first will. In 1931, he was treated in sanatoriums in Biarritz, and Orthez, in the Pyrénées-Atlantiques, where he attempted suicide by overdosing on medication. Prado Júnior, former mayor of Rio de Janeiro (then the capital of Brazil), had been exiled by the Revolution of 1930 and had gone to France. He found Santos-Dumont in a delicate state of health due to his worsening multiple sclerosis. Juniór contacted Santos-Dumont's family and asked the aeronaut's nephew Jorge Dumont Vilares to fetch his uncle from France. On 3 June 1931, while returning to Brazil aboard the steamer Lutetia, Santos-Dumont tried to kill himself again, but his nephew intervened. He would never return to France. On 4 June 1931, he was elected a member of the Brazilian Academy of Letters, even though he had no desire to be elected. Back in Brazil, they passed through Araxá, Rio de Janeiro, São Paulo and finally settled in Grand Hôtel La Plage, in Guarujá, in May 1932.

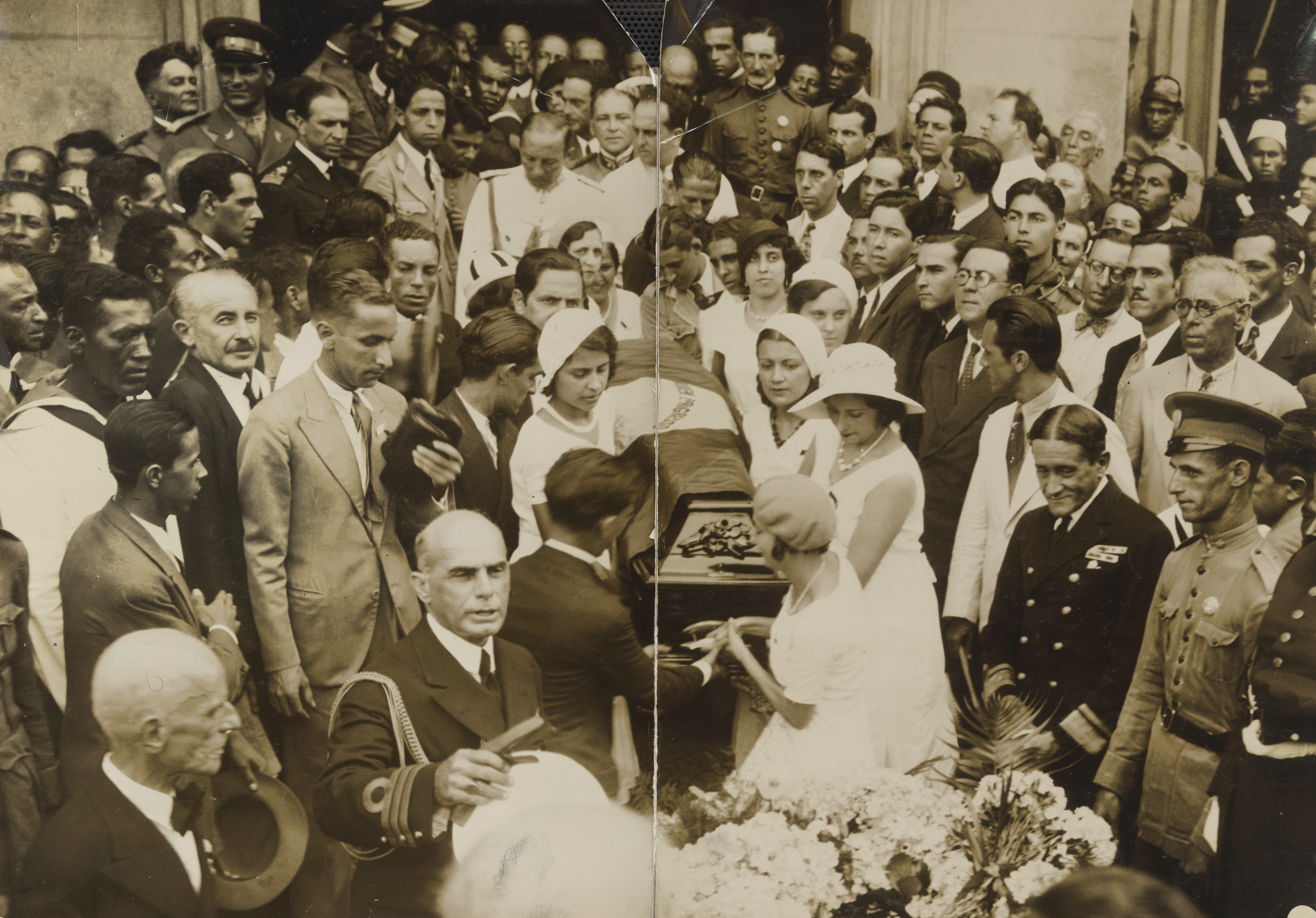
Burial of Santos-Dumont

In July 1932, the state of São Paulo rose up in the Constitutionalist revolution against the revolutionary government of Getúlio Vargas. On the 14th, Santos-Dumont wrote a letter in favour of "...constitutional order in the country..." to Governor Pedro de Toledo. When talking to professor and friend José de Oliveira Orlandi by phone, Santos-Dumont said: "My God! My God! Is there no way to avoid the bloodshed of brothers? Why did I make this invention which, instead of contributing to the love between men, turns into a cursed weapon of war? I am horrified by these airplanes that are constantly passing over Santos".

The conflict continued, and aeroplanes attacked the Campo de Marte in São Paulo on 23 July. They may have flown over Guarujá, and the sight of planes in combat may have caused deep anguish in Santos-Dumont who, in his nephew's absence, died by suicide at the age of 59. Decree No. 21,668 established three days of mourning. Coroners Roberto Catunda and Angelo Esmolari, who signed his death certificate, recorded the death as a heart attack. (Note: Cabangu.com.br says that the death was not registered until 3 December 1955.) The chambermaids who found his body reported that he had hanged himself with his tie. According to Henrique Lins de Barros, for a long time it was forbidden to say that he had killed himself and that the idea that he committed suicide due to the military use of the aeroplane would be a legend of the getulista period, as the government sought to mythologise him; the suicide could weaken this. The real cause may have been depression and bipolar disorder. The order of the governor Pedro de Toledo, following Santos-Dumont's death, was: "There will be no investigation, Santos Dumont did not commit suicide". (Note: Raimundo de Menezes, then delegate of the Santos Police, reported that the censorship as to the cause of death had been a request from the family.) Journalist Edmar Morel publicised the cause of death as suicide in 1944. (Note: The original article can be found at Morel, Edmar (December 1944). "O Suicídio de Santos Dumont". A Cigarra (in Brazilian Portuguese). No. 129. pp. 118–119, 132, 141.)

Santos-Dumont left no suicide note and had no descendants. His body was buried in São João Batista Cemetery, in Rio de Janeiro, on 21 December 1932, during a storm, under the replica of the Icarus de Saint Cloud he had built, after his remains had remained in the São Paulo capital for five months. Physician Walther Haberfield secretly removed his heart during the embalming process and preserved it in formaldehyde. After keeping this a secret for twelve years, he wanted to return it to the Santos-Dumont family, who refused it. The doctor then donated the heart to the Brazilian government after a request from Panair do Brasil. The heart is on display at the Air Force Museum in Campo dos Afonsos, Rio de Janeiro, inside a sphere carried by Icarus, designed by Paulo da Rocha Gomide.

== Legacy and tributes ==
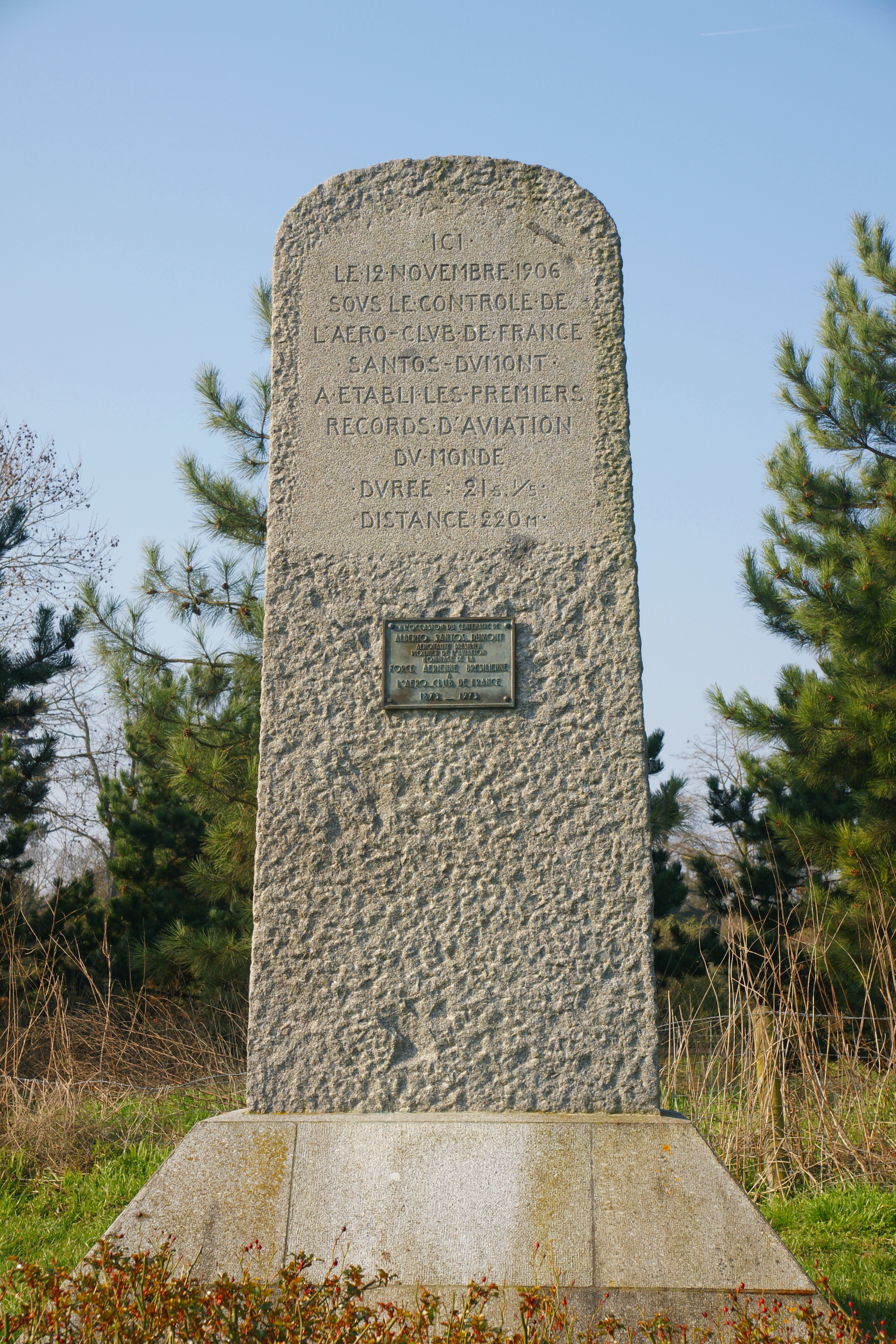
Monolith at the site of Santos-Dumont's flight at Bagatelle Gamefield

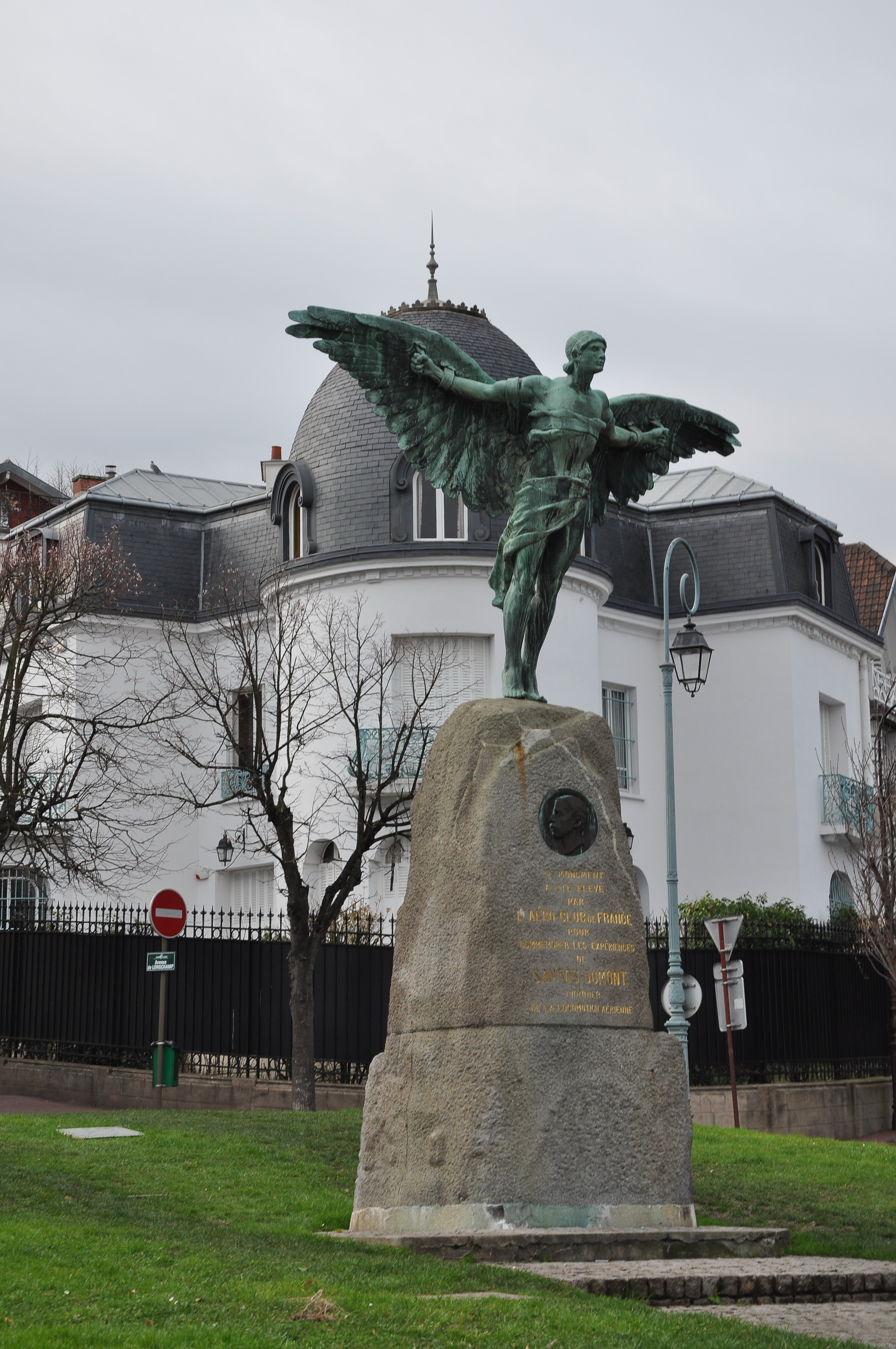
Monument in Saint-Cloud, France, inaugurated in 1910.

Several legends were told about our Brazilian friend. They said he had an immense fortune! Well, this fortune was only a remediated situation. But how to explain the gesture of this man who distributed prizes awarded for performances to charitable institutions? In the eyes of the public, these liberalities could only be based on a fabulous fortune. Not at all: Santos Dumont was generosity itself, innate elegance, kindness and righteousness. He gave without counting and without foresight, moved by an irresistible virtue... He left as a legacy nothing but his name engraved in our hearts. Those who knew him could not help but love him.

— Gabriel Voisin

On 25 July 1909, Louis Blériot crossed the English Channel, becoming a hero in France. In a letter, Santos-Dumont congratulated Blériot, his friend, with the following words: "This transformation of geography is a victory of air navigation over sea navigation. One day, perhaps, thanks to you, the airplane will cross the Atlantic". (Note: The first aviator in the Americas to cross the Atlantic Ocean without support ships and without making stops was the Brazilian João Ribeiro de Barros in 1927. The design of the Demoiselle allegedly influenced the aircraft that Blériot used in his crossing.) Blériot then replied, "I have done nothing but follow and imitate you. Your name to the aviators is a flag. You are our leader." Blériot's last project was named Santos-Dumont. Dias 2005 says that the inventor's influence was both in his aeronautical development and in advocating the public and personal use of aeronautics, whether through lighter or heavier-than-air.

During his career, Santos-Dumont's image was printed on products, his Panama hat and collar were copied, his balloons were modelled as toys, and confectioners made cakes shaped like airships. The European and American media reappropriated him as a French, presenting him as a "French aeronaut" or emphasizing his French ancestry, while the Brazilian media emphasized his Brazilian roots and nationality.

In 1904, renowned French jeweller Louis Cartier debuted the Santos-Dumont, a watch designed for the aviator himself. It was the first wristwatch the Maison made, and the collection retails to this day.

The Aéro-Club de France honoured him with two monuments: the first, in 1910, erected on the Bagatelle Gamefield, where he had flown with the Oiseau de Proie, and the second, in 1913, in Saint-Cloud, to commemorate the flight of airship No. 6 in 1901. On the unveiling of the Saint-Cloud monument – a statue of Icarus – one of his long-time friends, the cartoonist Georges Goursat (aka "Sem"), wrote the following for the magazine L'Illustration:

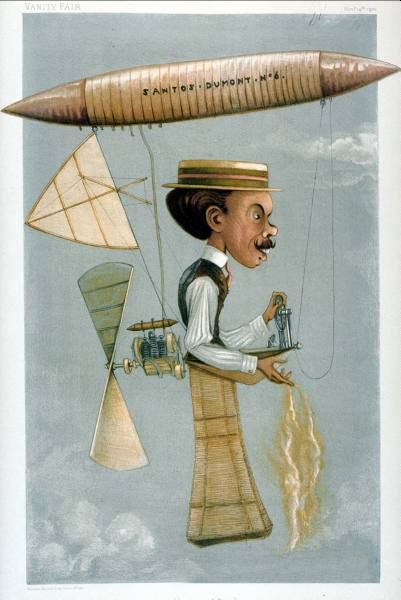
Santos-Dumont caricature in the British magazine Vanity Fair in 1901

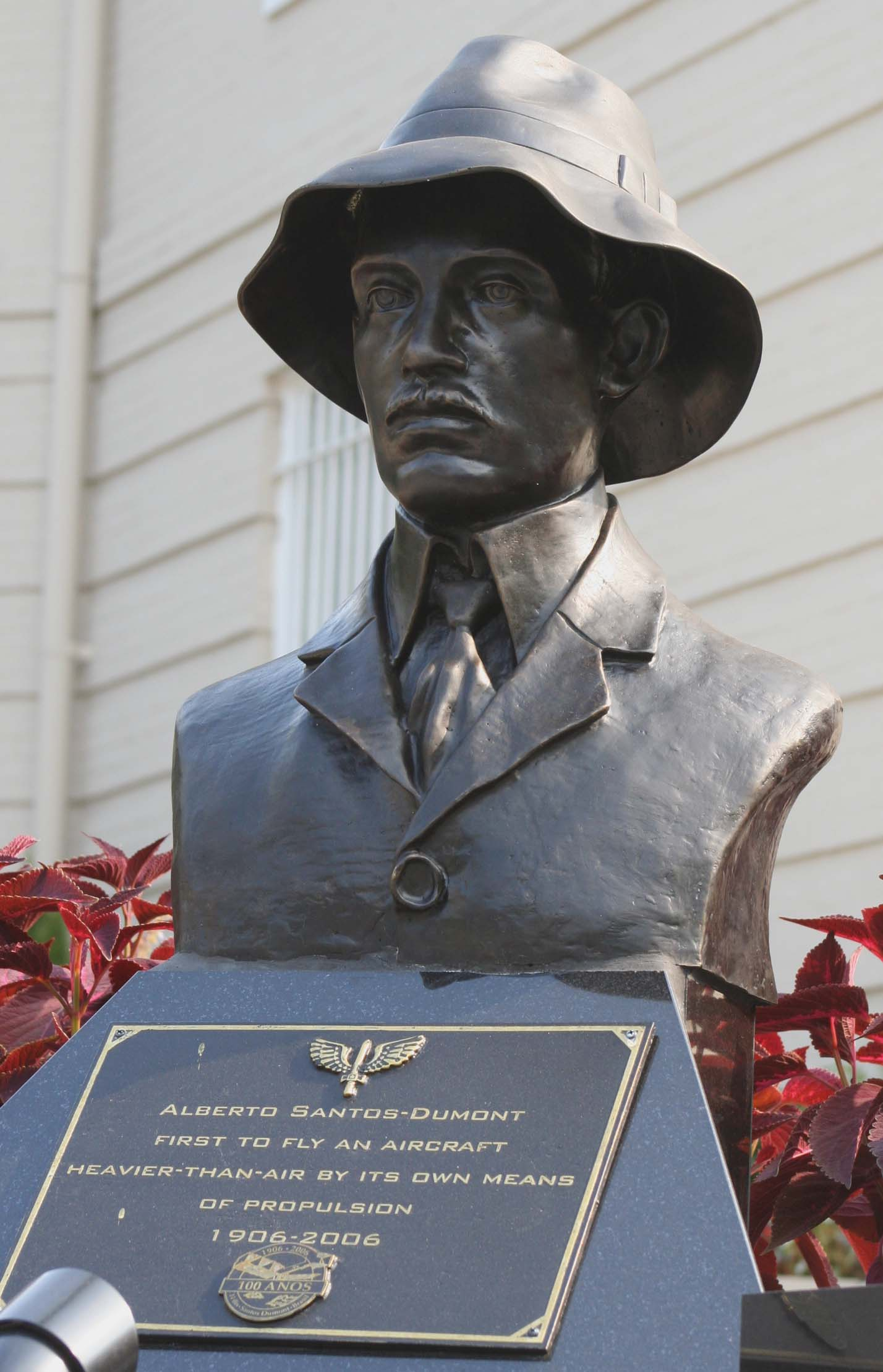
Santos-Dumont's bust at the Brazilian Embassy in Washington, D.C.

This superb genius of athletic forms, with a grave profile, holding open in the tethers of his arms his wings, rudely wielded like two shields, nobly symbolizes the great work of Santos-Dumont: he would evoke in a very inaccurate way the simple, agile, laughing little big man that he is in reality. Dressed in a jacket and very short pants that are always rolled up, covered with a soft hat whose brim is on the other hand always folded back, there is nothing monumental about him. What distinguishes him is his taste for simplification, for geometric shapes, and everything in his appearance denotes this character. He has a passion for precision instruments. Small precision machines are installed on his work table, true jewels of mechanics, which are of no use to him and are only there for the pleasure of having them as knickknacks. There, next to a barometer and a microscope of the latest model, you can see a marine chronometer in its mahogany case. Even on the terrace of his villa stands a splendid telescope, with which he indulges in the fantasy of inspecting the sky. He has a horror of all complication, all ceremony, all pomp. So, what a rude and delicious ordeal for his modesty, this inauguration! I have known him for thirteen years; it was the first time I saw him in top hat and overcoat. And even for this single circumstance – supreme concession to custom – his properly stretched pants covered his astonished boots. Standing at the foot of his own monument, dressed as an official hero, transfixed with embarrassment and clumsiness, he seemed to me like a kind of martyr to glory.

On 31 July 1932 state decree No. 10,447 changed the name of the town of Palmira, in Minas Gerais, to Santos-Dumont. Law No. 218, of 4 July 1936, declared 23 October to be "aviator's day," celebrating the historic flight on this date in 1906, "so that this commemoration will always have a worthy civic, sporting, and cultural celebration, especially in schools, emphasizing the initiative of the remarkable Brazilian Santos-Dumont". On 16 October 1936 Rio de Janeiro's first airport was named after him.

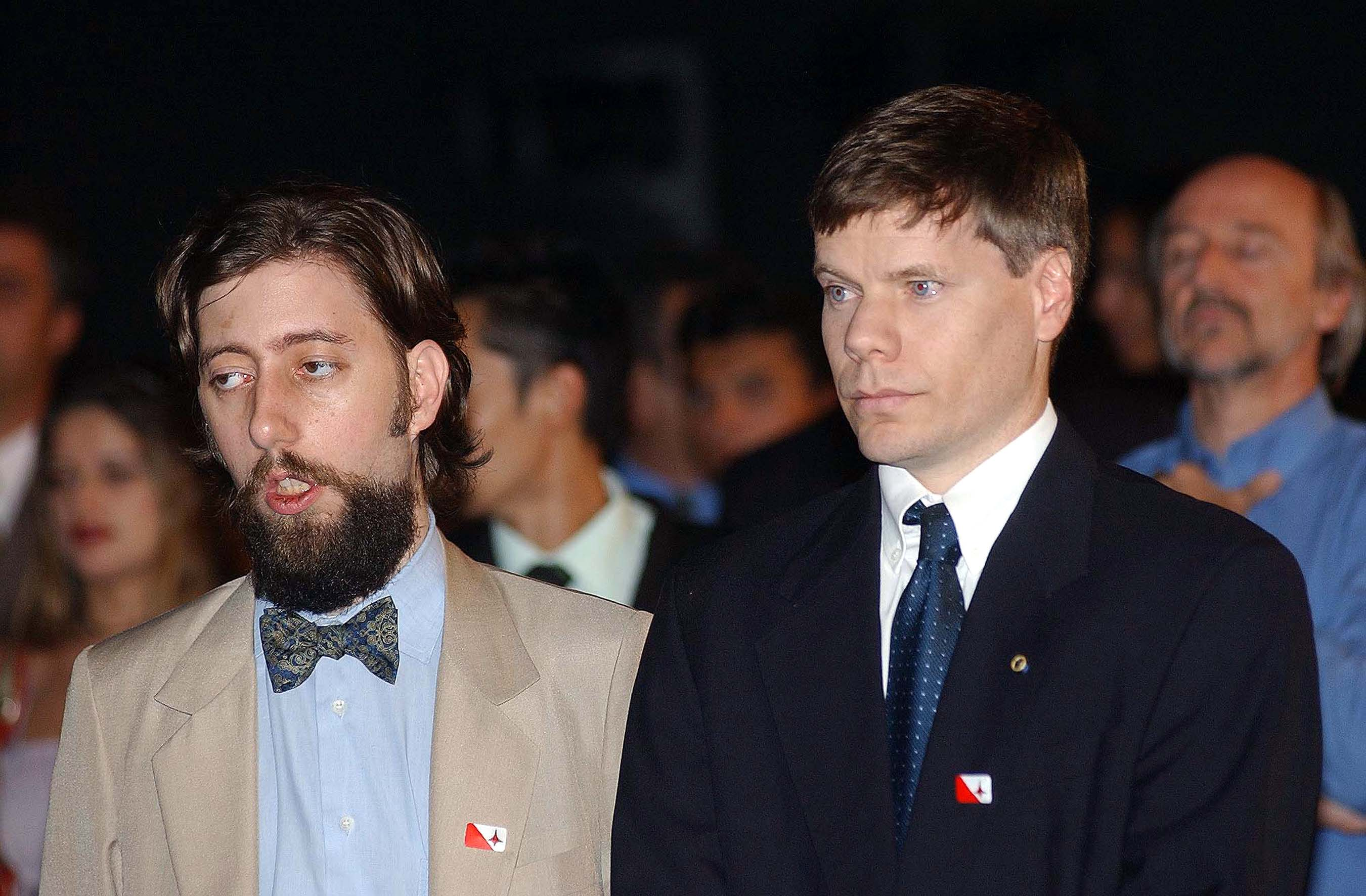
Alexandre and Marcos Villares, collateral descendants of Santos-Dumont, at the ceremony to name Santos-Dumont a national hero in Brasília, 26 July 2006

Law No. 165, dated 5 December 1947, granted him the honorary rank of lieutenant brigadier. Santos-Dumont's birthplace in Cabangu, Minas Gerais, was made into the Cabangu Museum by state decree (MG) No. 5,057, on 18 July 1956. Law No. 3636, of 22 September 1959, made him an honorary air marshal.

In 1976, the International Astronomical Union gave Santos-Dumont's name to a lunar crater (27.7°N 4.8°E). He is the only South American to be so honoured. Law 7.243, of 4 November 1984, granted him the title of "Patron of the Brazilian Aeronautics". On 13 October 1997, the then President of the United States, Bill Clinton, visiting Brazil, gave a speech at the Itamaraty Palace, referring to Santos-Dumont as the "father of aviation".

On 18 October 2005, the Brazilian Space Agency (AEB) and the Russian Federal Space Agency (Roscosmos) signed an agreement to carry out the Missão Centenário, which took Brazilian astronaut Marcos César Pontes to the International Space Station. The mission is a tribute to the centennial of Santos-Dumont's flight on the 14-bis, on 23 October 1906. The Soyuz TMA-8 spacecraft launched on 30 March 2006, from the Baikonur Launch Centre (Kazakhstan). On 26 July 2006 his name was included in the Steel Book of National Heroes in the Panteão da Pátria, in Brasília, granting him the status of National Hero.

== Cultural representations ==
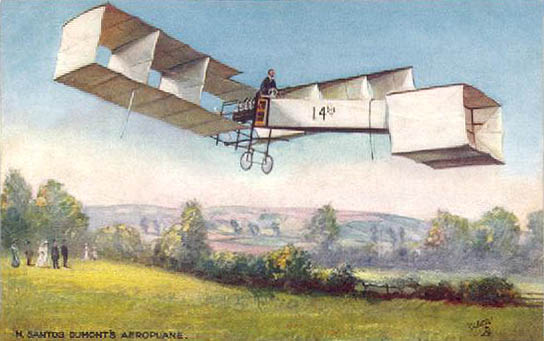
A postcard of the Santos-Dumont 14-bis

In 1902 the poet Eduardo das Neves composed the song "A Conquista do Ar" in honour of Santos-Dumont's achievements, described by Thomas Skidmore as 'a conspicuous example of "ufanism" during the [Brazilian] belle époque', while for Oliveira 2022 the song was "...an effort to insert Afro-Brazilians into cosmopolitan visions of flight." In 1924 Tarsila do Amaral painted "Carnaval em Madureira", which showed the replica of the Eiffel Tower and the airship built in Madureira for the Carnaval celebrations of that year, alongside Afro-Brazilians attending the event. During the 2004 carnival, the Unidos da Tijuca remembered the aviator, with several scientists – among them Nobel Prize winner Roald Hoffmann – dressed as Santos Dumont.

Santos-Dumont's friend Louis Cartier created a wristwatch for him in 1904. Up to that point, only women had wristwatches as they were considered a jewelry or fashion item only suitable for women; men only carried pocket watches. But Santos-Dumont needed both hands for flying and so Cartier created a wristwatch with a leather strap for him and called it the Cartier-Santos-Dumont. After his 1906 exploits, Santos-Dumont's picture was everywhere wearing the watch, and soon after, wristwatches became popular among men, possibly due to the publicity involving the watch Cartier made for his friend.

Over a century later, Cartier produced a series of watches named after him, celebrating the partnership between him and the brand. As a publicity piece, an award-winning film was made by France's Quad Productions entitled "L'Odyssée de Cartier".

In 1956, the Brazilian Post Office released a series of stamps commemorating the fiftieth anniversary of the first flight of a heavier-than-air aircraft. In 1973, they released a series of stamps to celebrate Santos-Dumont's centenary. On 23 October 2006, they launched a commemorative stamp for the centenary of the flight of the 14-bis. In the same month, the Brazilian Central Bank issued a coin commemorating Santos-Dumont's invention. He was depicted on the cruzeiro and cruzeiro novo banknotes.

In 2015, author Arthur Japin published the historical novel De gevleugelde (O Homem com Asas, in Brazil), about the aviator's life and death, and the extraction of his heart.

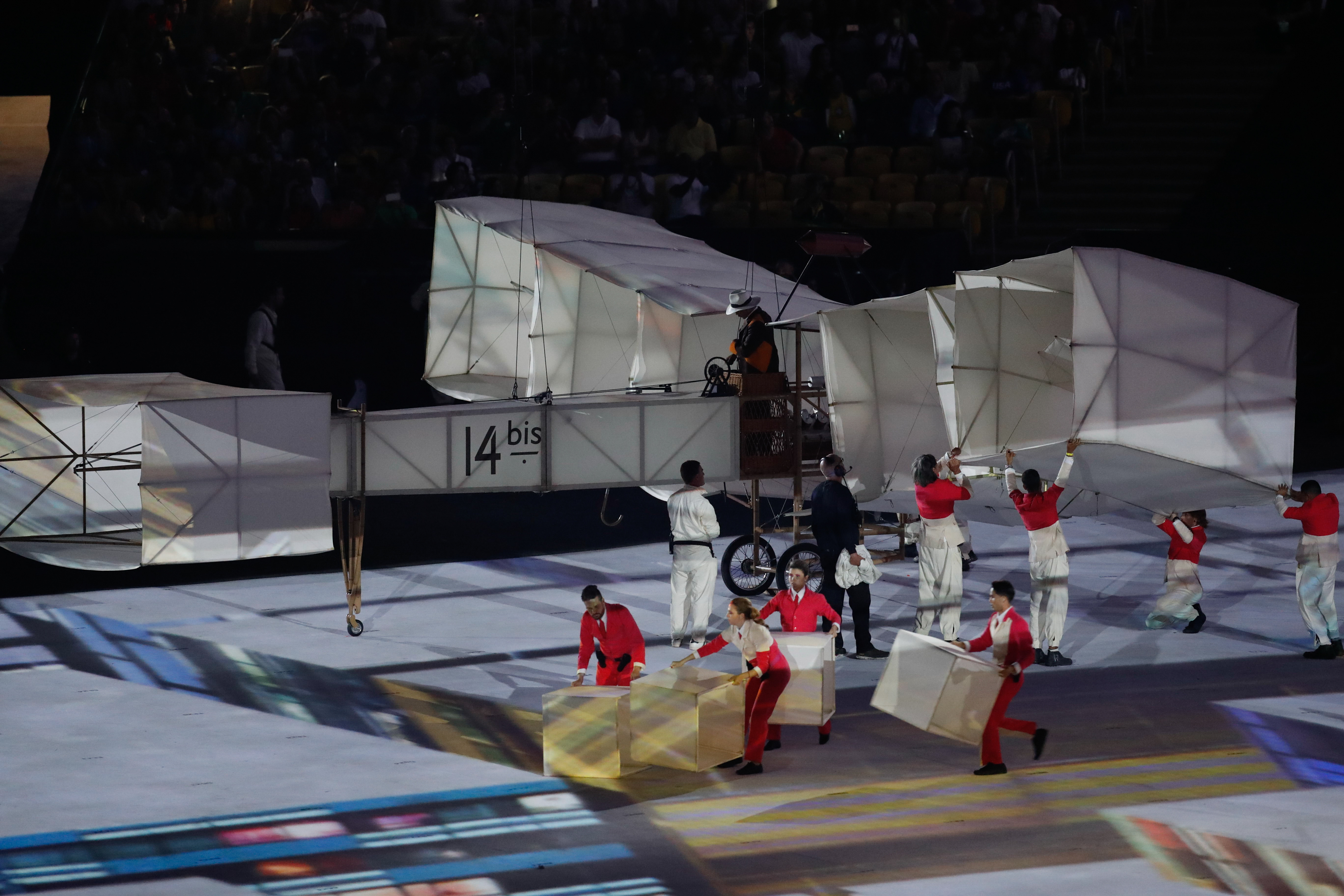
Santos-Dumont and the 14-bis represented in the 2016 Summer Olympics opening ceremony

During the opening ceremony of the 2016 Summer Olympic Games at the Maracanã Stadium, a replica of Santos-Dumont's 14-bis, was built in the stadium and, with the help of steel cables, flew over the runway, "taking off" for a flight over the city of Rio de Janeiro.

Santos-Dumont has been portrayed as a character in film, television, and theatre, played by Denis Manuel in Marcel Camus' Les faucheurs de marguerites (1974); by Cássio Scapin in the miniseries Um Só Coração (2004); by Daniel de Oliveira in the short film 14-bis (2006); by Ricardo Napoleão in Denise Stoklos' play "Mais Pesado que o Ar – Santos Dumont" (1996); and by Henri Lalli in the play Santos-Dumont (since 2003). Fernanda Montenegro played a transsexual descendant of Santos-Dumont in the soap opera Zazá (1997). TV Brasil produced the programme O Teco Teco, with a character named Betinho, depicting Santos-Dumont as a child.

On 10 November 2019, HBO released the miniseries Santos-Dumont across Latin America. The production follows the aviator's steps from childhood in his family's coffee fields Minas Gerais and São Paulo (where the family settled), to the sophisticated salons and aeroclubs in Paris, where Santos-Dumont made his historic flight in the 14-bis in 1906. Actor João Pedro Zappa played the inventor.

== Personal life ==
=== Sexuality ===
Santos-Dumont never married and was rather shy, and his sexuality has long been debated, including by his biographers.

Researcher Henrique Lins de Barros, from the Brazilian Center for Physics Research, rejects the thesis that the Brazilian inventor was homosexual, arguing that he was just a man concerned with his appearance. According to Barros, "The French refinement sounded like homosexual affectation to American journalists, who described him as effeminate. (...) Hoffman did not understand the customs and values of the time and saw everything with the distorted view that was held at that time in the United States." Also, in his article "Alberto Santos-Dumont: Pioneiro da Aviação," Barros notes that Santos-Dumont had a media-heralded engagement to Edna Powers, daughter of an American millionaire. (Note: About Santos-Dumont and Powers' relationship, read CENDOC 2021, pp. 52–53) Cosme Degenar Drumond, writer of "Alberto Santos-Dumont: Novas Revelações," says that in France Santos-Dumont has "a reputation as a conqueror". Santos-Dumont was listed in the list of the "100 VIP homosexuals of Brazil," formulated by anthropologist Luiz Mott, rekindling the discussion about Santos-Dumont's sexuality. Santos-Dumont's family has denied that he was homosexual. Santos-Dumont allegedly had a homo-affective affair with Georges Goursat in 1901.

Yolanda Penteado, in her autobiography Tudo em cor de rosa, says: "(...) I met Alberto Santos-Dumont, a brother of my uncle Henrique. Seu Alberto, as we called him, came every day for dinner and stayed over, saying it was to see the moon come out. In Flamengo the full moon nights were really beautiful. He was a restless person. I thought it was funny that he gave me so much attention. And Aunt Amalia would say: "Alberto, you are getting dizzy dating this girl". Alberto, in fact, used to court me, bring me chocolates, flowers, take me for walks. The people who knew him best said that when he saw me he became electric".

In a 1901 letter a friend, Santos-Dumont wrote that he was in love with an American woman: "[M]y heart is already very much with her ... and I don't know what to do, whether to stop the courtship or to continue."

=== Mental health ===
Santos-Dumont is traditionally described as having developed multiple sclerosis. However, this diagnosis is disputed by other researchers:

Henrique Lins de Barros questions this diagnosis: "I think it difficult to believe in this hypothesis of multiple sclerosis... How could anyone suffering from a degenerative disease like multiple sclerosis ski in Saint Moritz in the 1910s and play tennis in the 1920s, as he did?" Marcos Villares Filho, great-grandnephew of Santos-Dumont, says that he probably had a profound depression. The documentation of the time does not provide a good deal of information to determine that Santos-Dumont suffered from multiple sclerosis.

The original diagnosis came after consulting a doctor due to symptoms such as dizziness and double vision. Later, this diagnosis was challenged by other doctors, who believed that the aviator was already suffering from psychiatric manifestations. The symptoms reported for the original diagnosis would be only two related to multiple sclerosis.

From biographies of Santos-Dumont, Elie Cheniaux of the Federal University of Rio de Janeiro concludes that Santos-Dumont likely suffered from bipolar disorder or manic syndrome, with his latest bizarre inventions being able to demonstrate the "loss of critical ability", and notes several episodes showing bursts of energy outside of his depressive episodes. Santos-Dumont reportedly developed depression in 1910, predating the use of the aeroplane in the war, which, according to Cheniaux, would indicate that his feeling of guilt was a symptom rather than the cause. A letter written in 1931 by a doctor at the Orthez sanatorium to a friend of Santos-Dumont describes him as 'suffering from anxious melancholy with delusions of self-blame, from imaginary guilt, and awaiting punishment', also identified as neurasthenia, an exhaustion of the central nervous system.

Bipolar disorder is one of the disorders most connected with suicide and Santos-Dumont already had precedents in his family, with his mother having taken her own life in 1902 and that the aviator already demonstrated at the end of his life a number of epidemiological risk factors for suicide. It is hard to determine any diagnosis due to the lack of medical documentation.

== Publications ==
Books

- Dans l'air (in French). Charpentier et Fasquelle. 1904. p. 370.
- O que eu vi, o que nós veremos (in Portuguese). São Paulo: Santos-Dumont. 1918. p. 101. OL 32235835M.

Articles

- "Une Ascension au Jardin D'Acclimatation". L'Aéronautique (in French). Paris: 103–105. 1898.
- "Travel by Balloon". Baltimore American. CXCII (34925): 1. 5 January 1902.
- Dumont, A. Santos (June 1902). "Air-Ships and Flying-Machines" (PDF). The North American Review. 174 (547): 721–729. JSTOR 25119252.
- "How I Became an Aëronaut and My Experience with Air-Ships". McClure's Magazine. 19 (4): 307–316. August 1902.
- "How I Became an Aëronaut and My Experience with Air-Ships". McClure's Magazine. 19 (5): 454–464. September 1902.
- "The Sensations and Emotions of Aerial Navigation". The Pall Mall Magazine. 32 (129): 11–22. January 1904.
- "Ce que je ferai, Ce que l'on fera". Je Sais Tout (in French) (1). Paris: 105–114. 1905.
- "The Future of Air-ships". The Fortnightly Review (459): 442–454. 1 March 1905.
- "The Pleasures of Ballooning". The Independent. 58 (2948): 1225–1232. 1 June 1905.
- "Aerial Transportation" . The Fresno Republican. p. 4. 10 September 1916 – via Wikisource. [scan ]
- "Linking the Nations of the Western Hemisphere" . Flying. pp. 31–33, 44. February 1917 – via Wikisource. [scan ]
- "10,000 Aeroplanes to Protect the Monroe Doctrine" . Chicago Sunday Herald. p. 4. 25 March 1917 – via Wikisource. [scan ]
- "South and Central America waiting for Aerial Transportation" . Flying. p. 703. September 1919 – via Wikisource. [scan ]

Translations of his works

- My Airships. London, G. Richards. 1904. p. 352. OL 6871807W.
- Im Reich der Lüfte (in German). Translated by Ludwig Holthol. Stuttgart und Leipzig, Deutsche verlags-anstalt. 1905. p. 194. LCCN 31022969.
- I. R. Belopolsky, ed. (1911). "Как я выиграл приз Дейча де-Ламетра". Въ мірѣ новыхъ ощущеній. pp. 31–46.
- "Os Meus Balões" (1938). Translated to Portuguese by Arthur de Miranda Bastos.
  - Os Meus Balões (PDF). Translated by A. de Miranda Bastos. Brasília: Fundação Rondon. 1986. p. 244. ISBN 85-278-0002-0. Archived (PDF) from the original on 18 November 2007.
- Miaj Balonoj/ Kion Mi Vidis, Kion Ni Vidos (in Esperanto). Translated by Luiz Fernando Dias Pita (1 ed.). Clube de Autores. 2020. ISBN 978-65-86182-06-4.
- Ce que j'ai vu, ce que nous verrons (in French). Translated by Benjamin Voisin. 2022. p. 75. ISBN 979-8-4230-8665-7.
- "O Homem Mecânico": published in Portuguese in the work "Os Balões de Santos-Dumont", 2010.

Non published

- "L'Homme Mécanique", typescript from 1929.
- A book of 13 chapters, untitled, addressing aeronautical events of the 18th to 20th centuries.

== See also ==
- Aeronautics engineer
- List of aerospace engineers
- Early flying machines
- List of early flying machines
- List of firsts in aviation
- Conversor marciano
- Santos-Dumont Merit Medal

== Works cited ==
- Dumont, Alberto Santos- (1902). "How I Became an Aëronaut and My Experience with Air-Ships". McClure's Magazine. 19 (5): 454–464.
- "Le Martin" (in French). No. 6331. 26 June 1901. p. 6.
- "La Fronde" (in French). No. 1146. 28 January 1901. p. 4.
- Visoni, Rodrigo Moura; Canalle, João Batista Garcia (2009). "Como Santos Dumont inventou o avião" [How Santos Dumont invented the airplane]. Revista Brasileira de Ensino de Física (in Brazilian Portuguese). 31 (3): 6. doi:10.1590/S1806-11172009000300015. Archived from the original on 23 February 2022.
- "Um balão dirigível". Correio Paulistano (in Brazilian Portuguese). Vol. 47, no. 13.052. 3 January 1900. p. 4.

Preceded by Graça Aranha (founder)	Brazilian Academy of Letters – Occupant of the 38th chair 1931–1932	Succeeded by Celso Vieira
