= Santos Dumont (miniseries) =

- Genre: Biographical drama
- Written by: Pedro Motta Gueiros; Gabriel Mariani Flaksman
- Directed by: Fernando Acquarone; Estevão Ciavatta
- Country of origin: Brazil
- Original languages: Portuguese; French; Spanish; English
- No. of seasons: 1
- No. of episodes: 6

Production
- Producer: Susana Campos
- Production location: Rio de Janeiro
- Cinematography: Dudu Miranda
- Running time: 60 minutes
- Production companies: HBO Brazil; Pindorama Filmes

Original release
- Network: HBO
- Release: November 10 – December 15, 2019

Santos Dumont is a Brazilian mini-series produced by HBO Brazil that dramatizes the life of inventor Alberto Santos Dumont.

== Synopsis ==
The miniseries deals with the inventor's childhood in Brazil, parallel to his mature period in France, where he was involved in the evolution of lighter- and heavier-than-air aircraft.

== Production ==
The pre-production took four years, where scriptwriters Pedro Mota Gueiros and Gabriel Mariani Flaksman did extensive research among the various biographies and texts written by or about the aviator.

Actor João Pedro Zappa did five months of intensive French lessons to participate in the production, even stayed two weeks in Cannes to train the language, Belgian actor Thierry Tremouroux helped him in the language and considered him to be the most complex character he has ever faced.

Entrepreneur Alan Calassa lent his replicas of 14-bis and Demoiselle for production. The technical drawings were recreated by the team that opted for the most practical effects. The production filmed scenes outside the National Museum before the fire.

== Cast ==
- João Pedro Zappa - Santos Dumont
- Miguel Pinheiro - Nuno
- Joana de Verona - Almerinda
- Guilherme Garcia - Santos Dumont (child)
- Thierry Tremouroux - Albert Chapin
- Josias Duarte - Etienne
- Jean Pierre Noher
- Antonio Saboia - Louis Blériot
- Kauan Ceglio - Jorge Dumont
- Cláudio Perotto - Father Jonas

== Episodes ==
No. overall	No. in season	Title	Directed by	Written by	Original release date	Prod. code	U.S. viewers (millions)
1	TBA	"Le Petit Santos"	Fernando Acquarone; Estevão Ciavatta	Pedro Motta Gueiros	November 10, 2019	TBA	N/A
The origins of Santos Dumont's dreams during his childhood in Brazil and his first experiences in France with the balloon Brazil and the No. 1.
2	TBA	"O Prêmio Deutsch"	Fernando Acquarone; Estevão Ciavatta	Gabriel Mariani Flaksman	November 17, 2019	TBA	N/A
The beginning of the Deutsch Prize in the year 1901. Flights, accidents, controversies and the relationship of Santos Dumont with Aida de Acosta and the cartoonist Sem. This episode also has the representation of Isabel, Princess Imperial of Brazil.
3	TBA	"Por Ares Nunca Dantes Navegados"	Fernando Acquarone; Estevão Ciavatta	Pedro Motta Gueiros	November 24, 2019	TBA	N/A
Controversy in St. Louis after intrigue with the Paris Aeroclub. Return to Europe and the flight of Aida de Acosta at the Nº9. The title means "Through heavens hereto unsailed", a play with the words "Thro' seas where sail was never spread before", from the work The Lusiads, by Luís de Camões.
4	TBA	"Mais Pesado que o Ar"	Fernando Acquarone; Estevão Ciavatta	Gabriel Mariani Flaksman	December 1, 2019	TBA	N/A
The death of engineer and balloonist Henri Lachambre marks the end of an era in the life of Santos Dumont, who then began to compete for the creation of the heavier than air in the form of the 14-bis, within the context of the Archdeacon Prize, having rivals people like Louis Blériot and allies like Gabriel Voisin.
5	TBA	"O Vôo da Libélula"	Fernando Acquarone; Estevão Ciavatta	Pedro Motta Gueiros; Gabriel Mariani Flaksman	December 8, 2019	TBA	N/A
Flights within the Archdeacon Prize and the Grand Prix d'Aviation. The successes of the 14-bis, Blériot, Farman, the creation of the Demoiselle, the arrival of the Wright brothers in Europe and the end of the air career of Santos Dumont.
6	TBA	"Ícaro"	Fernando Acquarone; Estevão Ciavatta	Pedro Motta Gueiros	December 15, 2019	TBA	N/A
The World War I began to charge its price in Santos Dumont, to the point of being arrested for a misunderstanding of the police during the development of the paradoxical cannon. Back in Brazil, with the diagnosis of multiple sclerosis, he does not accept retirement, he builds The Enchanted, where he invents the Martian converter that is tested by Yolanda Penteado. The Constitutionalist Revolution of 1932 began to take its toll, where Dumont believes he is responsible for preventing conflict between brothers. This continued until his final act.

== See also ==
- Alberto Santos Dumont
- List of Santos-Dumont aircraft
- My Airships (Autobiography by Santos Dumont)
- O que eu vi, o que nós veremos (Portuguese autobiography).
