= Penteado =

Penteado is a surname. Notable people with the surname include:

- Armando Álvares Penteado (1884–1947), Brazilian architect, coffee estate owner, and patron of art
- Fernando Penteado (born 1934), Brazilian Roman Catholic bishop
- Lucas Penteado (born 1996), Brazilian actor
- Miguel Penteado, Brazilian publisher, printer, and comic artist
- Olívia Guedes Penteado (1872–1934), Brazilian art patron and philanthropist
- Yolanda Penteado (1903-1983), Brazilian patron of the arts
