= Bagatelle Gamefield =

Sports fields in Paris

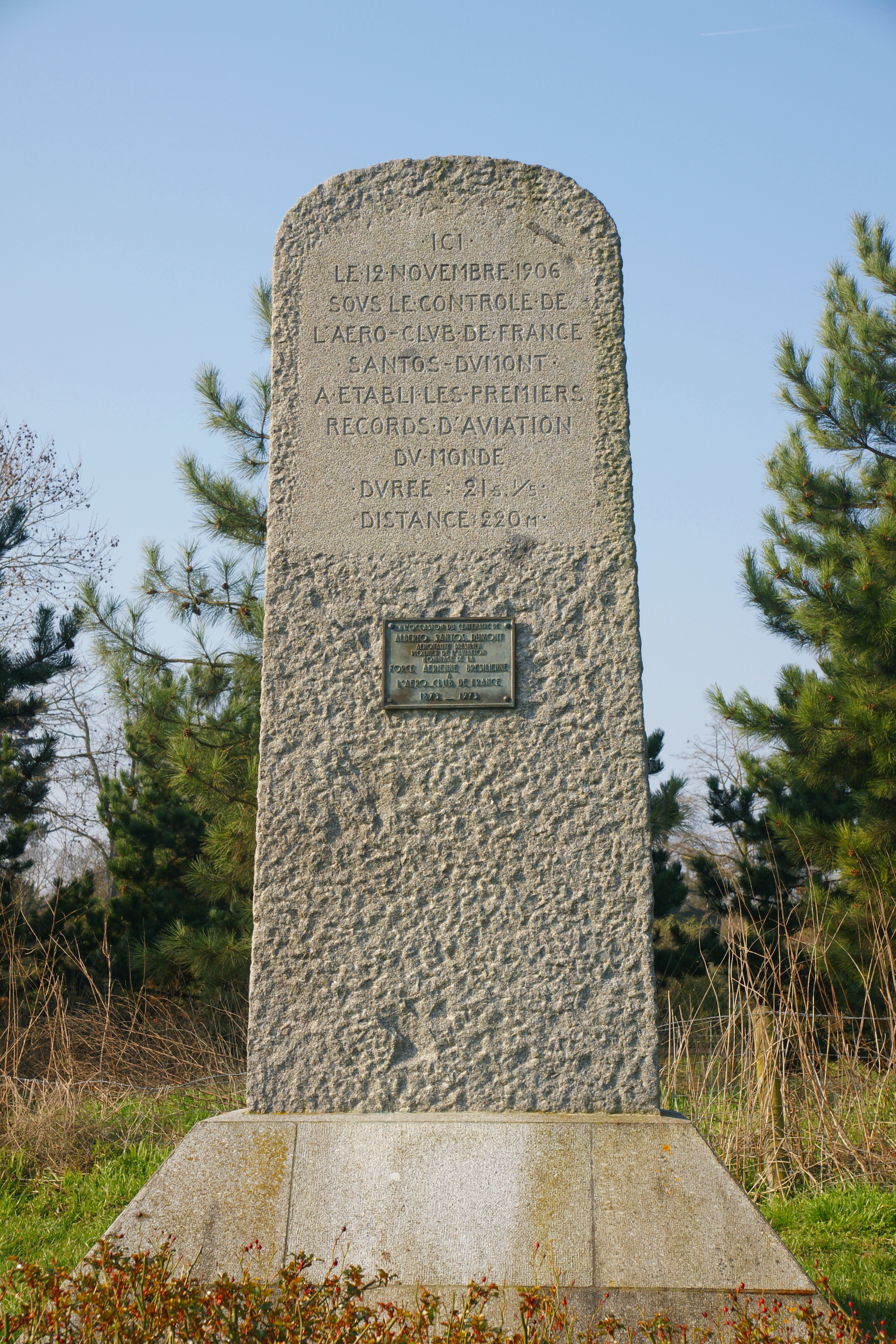
Monolith which records the site of the Santos-Dumont flight at the Bagatelle Field on November 12, 1906.

The Bagatelle Gamefield (French Plaine de Jeux de Bagatelle) is a public recreation area for practicing various sports and leisure activities, among them football, rugby and cricket.

Located in the vicinity of the Château de Bagatelle, in the region of the Bois de Boulogne in Paris, the field served as the stage for several aviation experiences of pioneer Alberto Santos Dumont in 1906.

The place preserves a monument (48°52′5″N 2°14′24″E) which makes reference to the flight of 14-Bis, in which it is written:

Ici le 12 novembre 1906, sous le contrôle de l'Aero-Club de France, Santos-Dumont a établi les premiers records d'aviation du monde : duree 21s 1/5, distance 220 m.

Translated: Here, on November 12, 1906, under the control of the air club of France, Santos-Dumont established the world's first aviation records. Duration: 21s 1/5, Distance: 220m.

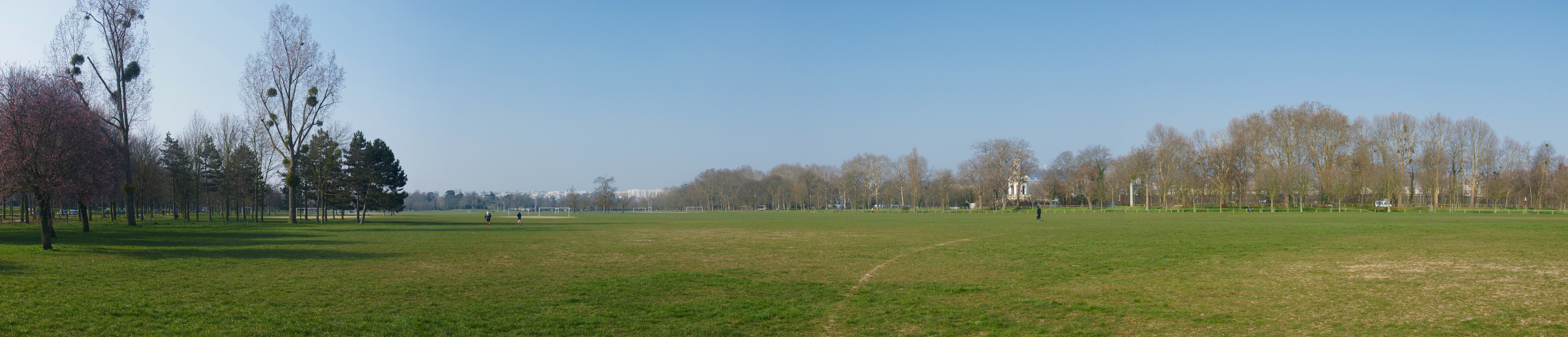
Panorama of the Bagatelle Gamefield
