= Gabriel and the Mountain =

2017 film

- Film poster
- Directed by: Fellipe Gamarano Barbosa
- Written by: Fellipe Gamarano Barbosa; Lucas Paraizo; Kirill Mikhanovsky
- Starring: Caroline Abras
- Release dates: 21 May 2017 (Cannes); 30 August 2017 (France); 2 November 2017 (Brazil)
- Running time: 127 minutes
- Countries: Brazil; France
- Languages: English; Portuguese; French; Swahili

Gabriel and the Mountain (Portuguese: Gabriel e a montanha) is a 2017 Brazilian-French drama film directed by Fellipe Gamarano Barbosa. It was screened in the Critics' Week section at the 2017 Cannes Film Festival. At Cannes, it won the France 4 Visionary Award and the Gan Foundation Support for Distribution Award.

== Plot ==
The film tells the true story of Brazilian backpacker Gabriel Buchmann who travels through several African countries, some of the time with his girlfriend Cristina, and dies while climbing Mount Mulanje, Malawi.

== Cast ==
- Caroline Abras as Cristina
- João Pedro Zappa as Gabriel
- Luke Mpata
- John Goodluck
- Rashidi Athuman
- Leonard Siampala
- Rhosinah Sekeleti
- Alex Alembe

== Reception ==
On review aggregator website Rotten Tomatoes, the film holds an approval rating of 83%, based on 18 reviews, and an average rating of 6.5/10. On Metacritic, the film has a weighted average score of 69 out of 100, based on 9 critics, indicating "generally favorable reviews".
