= Conversor marciano =

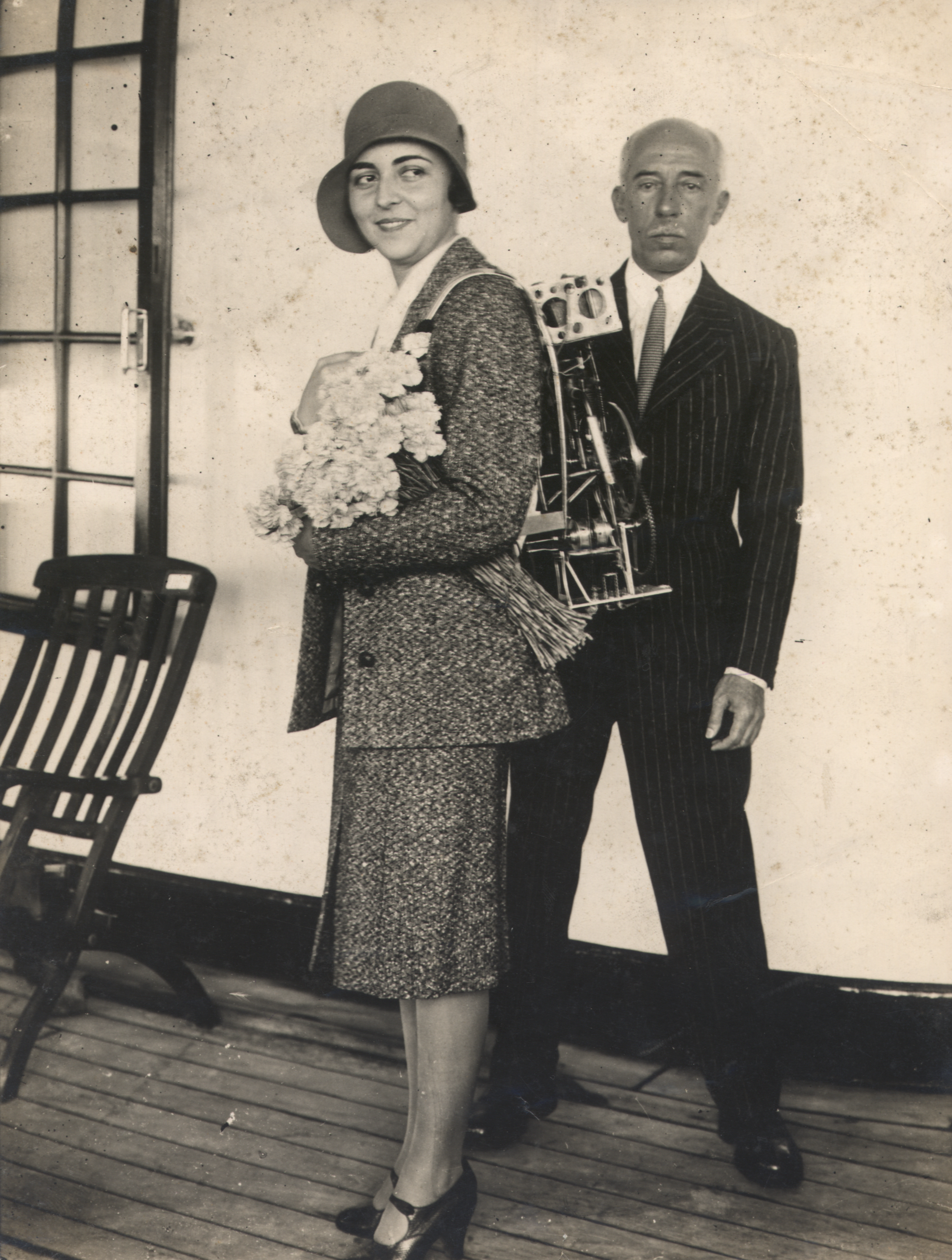
Yolanda Penteado demonstrates the Conversor Marciano; behind, Santos Dumont.

Conversor marciano, or transformador marciano, is an invention of Alberto Santos Dumont to assist climbers.

== Description ==
The equipment was placed on the back, like a backpack, and when a motorized propeller was connected, it reduced the weight of the body in the ascent of mountains. The name of this one that was considered a "strange device" comes from the idea of Santos Dumont to reproduce the gravity of Mars, lower than that of the Earth.

Santos Dumont held a demonstration of equipment in the National Museum in 1932.

It is considered that, with the advent of cable cars, the invention has become obsolete and had negative economic impact on its creator.

== Gallery ==
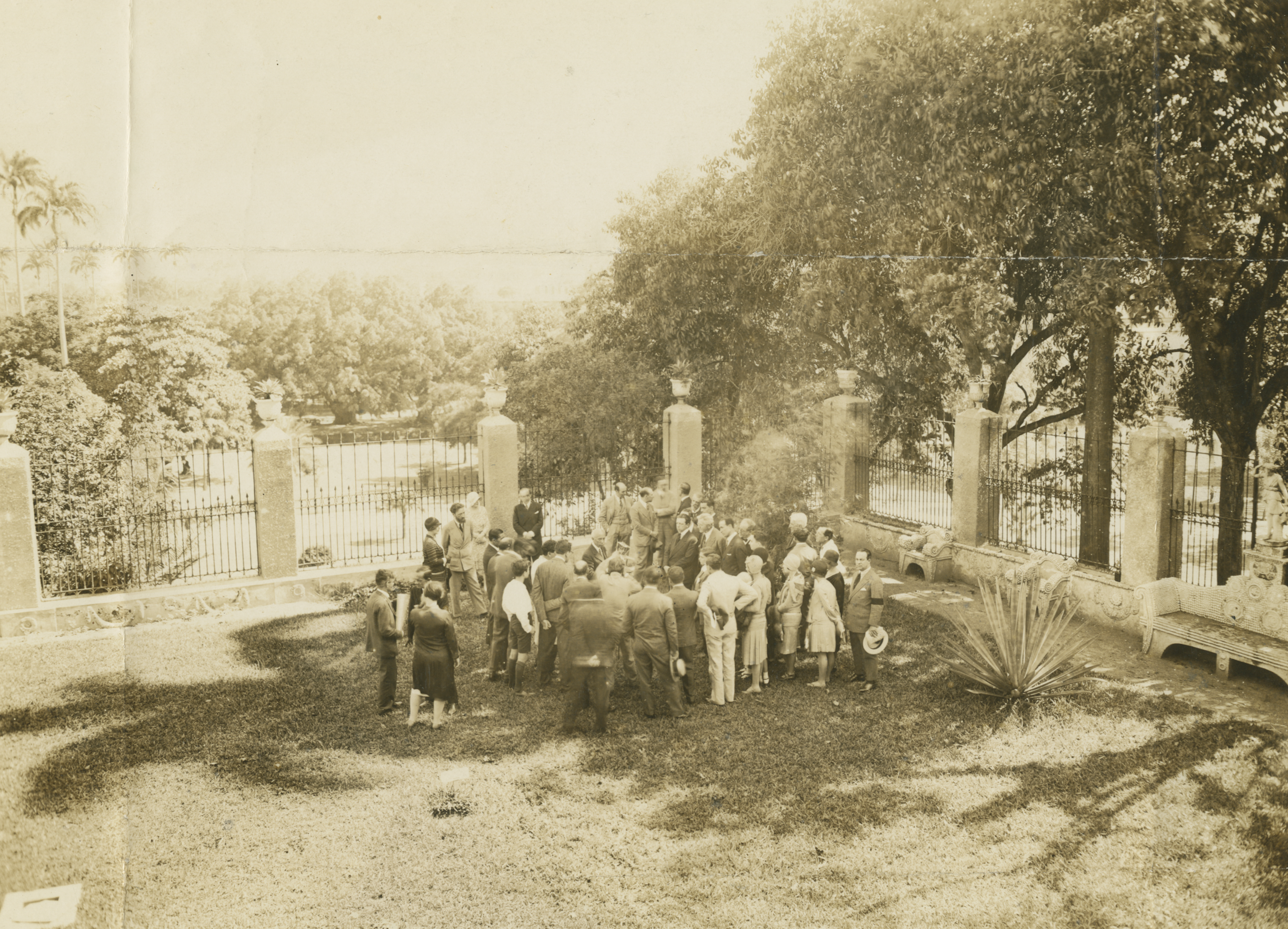
At the National Museum, Santos Dumont exhibited his invention in 1932.

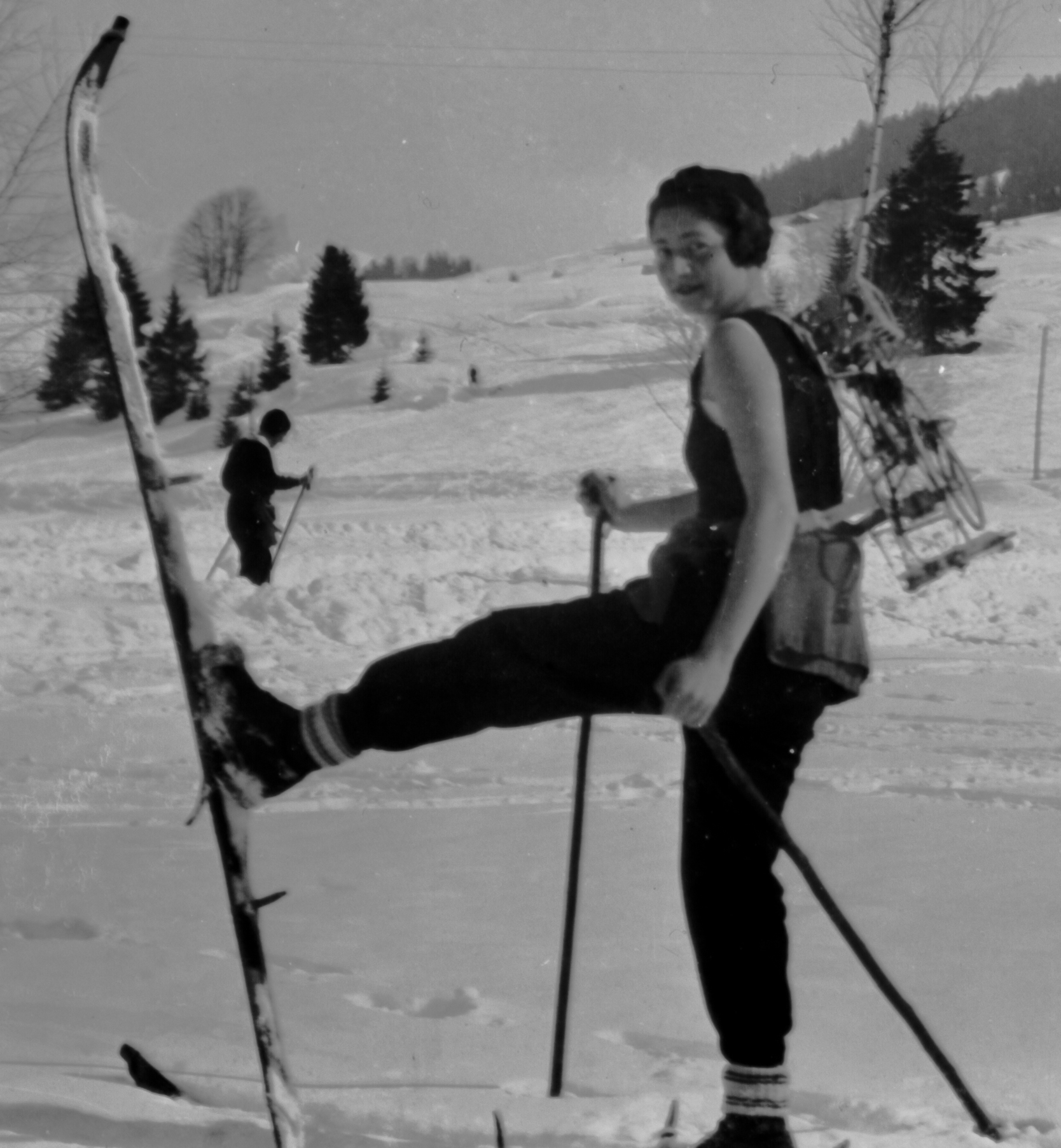
Testing, 1926.

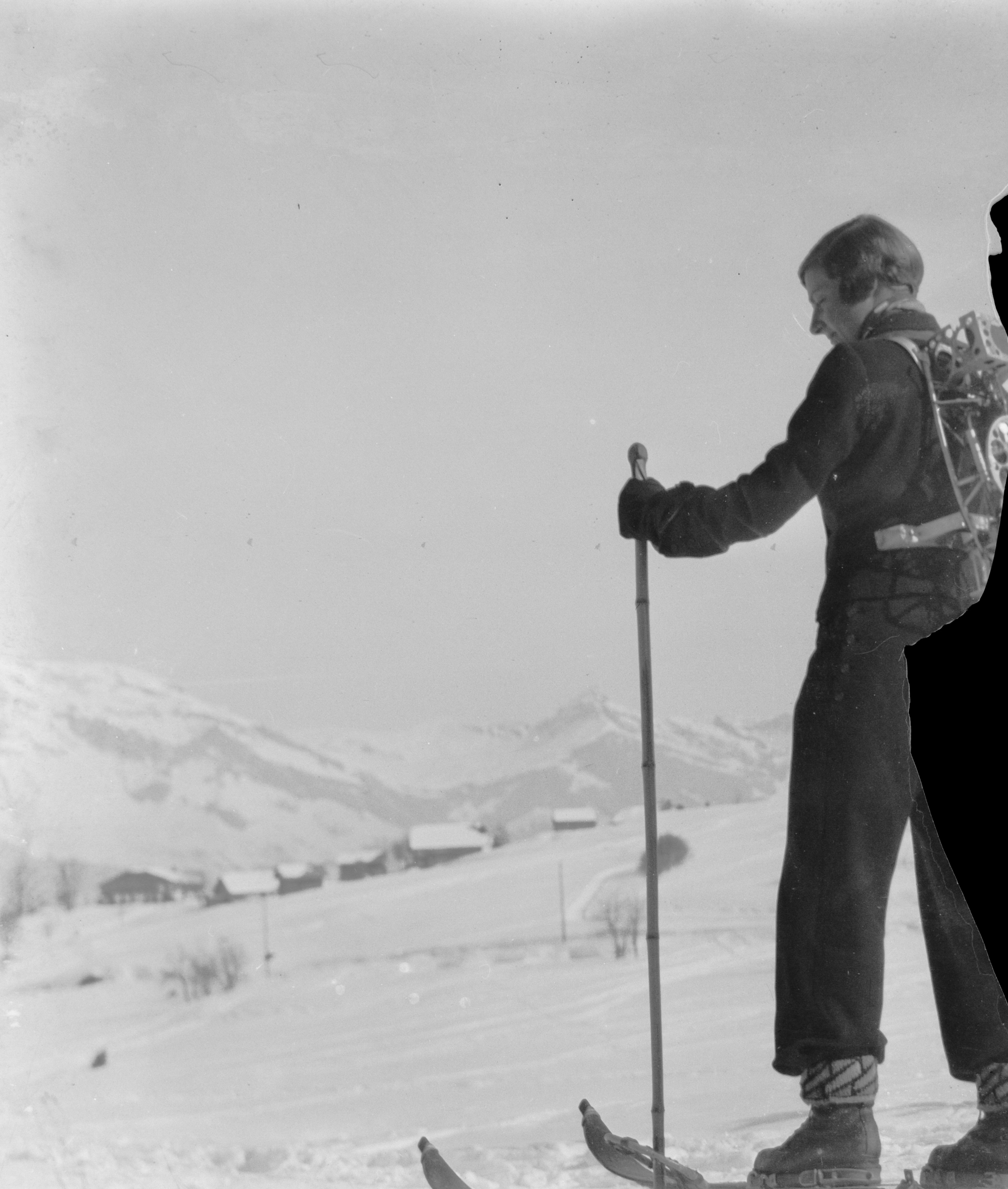
Experimental usage, 1926.
