= João Pedro Zappa =

Brazilian actor

- Born: João Pedro Zappa Motta; 8 October 1988 (age 36); Rio de Janeiro, Brazil
- Occupation: Actor

João Pedro Zappa Motta (born 8 October 1988) is a Brazilian actor.

== Life ==
Born in Rio de Janeiro, Zappa began acting at Teatro O Tablado from 2002 to 2010. He graduated from Faculdade da Cidade with a degree in theatre. He is known for Por Toda Minha Vida, Além do Tempo, and Gabriel and the Mountain, as well as the mini-series Santos Dumont. During the filming for the latter, he studied French for 5 months to play the titular character. He considers him to be the most complex character he has played.

== Filmography ==
=== Television ===
Year	Show	Role	Notes
2007	Cilada		Guest appearance
2008	Guerra e Paz		Episode: Cães & Gatos
2009	Por Toda Minha Vida	Jerry Adriani	Episode: Especial Raul Seixas
2009	Cinquentinha	Gabriel Santoro de Carvalho Flores	
2010	Nosso Querido Trapalhão		Year end special
2010	A Turma do Pererê	Tatu Pedro Vieira	
2010	Morando Sozinho	Conrado	
2014	Segunda Dama	Gregório Garcez (Greg)	
2015	Além do Tempo	Bento (young)	Guest appearance
2015	Questão de Família	Miguel	
2017	Os Dias Eram Assim	Sérgio Amaral (Serginho)	
2017	Os Homens São de Marte	João Campos	Episode: "17 de setembro"
2019	Vítimas Digitais	Arthur	Episode: "Maria Clara"
2019	Santos Dumont	Santos Dumont	
2020	Reality Z	TK	
2021	Nos Tempos do Imperador	Cornélio Pindaíba (Nélio)	
2023	Betinho - No Fio da Navalha	Felipe	
2024	Suíte Magnólia	Rubem	
2025	Raul Seixas: Metamorfose Ambulante	Paulo Coelho	

=== Film ===
Year	Title	Role	Notes
2008	O Vampiro do Meio-Dia	Teenager	Short film
2009	Enquanto Isso	Bernado	Short film
2009	Direita É a Mão Que Você Escreve	Antônio	Short film
2011	Desassossego (Filme das Maravilhas)		
2012	Gaydar		Short film
2012	Ressaca	Thiago	
2012	Os Mortos-Vivos		Short film
2012	Disparos	Guto	
2013	Coisas Nossas	Ivan	Short film
2014	Boa Sorte	João	
2014	Mutantes	Bruno	Short film
2014	Aula de Reforço	Bento	Short film
2015	Éden	Vinte Anos	
2017	Destinos	Antônio	Short film
2017	Gabriel and the Mountain	Gabriel Buchmann	
2018	Vende-se esta Moto	Xéu	
2018	Rasga Coração	Maguari Pistolão	
2019	B.O.	João Lucas	
2021	Noites de Alface	Nico	

=== Theatre ===
Year	Title	Role
2007	O Dragão Verde	
2008-09	Um Garoto Chamado Rorbeto	
2012	Querida Helena Sergueievna	Volódia
2013	A importância de ser perfeito	Cecília
2014	Pedro Malazarte e a Arara Gigante	Janota
2015	Sonhos de um Sedutor	Alan
2015	O Processo	
2016	Guia Afetivo da Periferia	
2018	Pra onde vão os corações partidos	Santiago

== Awards and nominations ==
Year	Award	Nomination	Work	Result	Ref
2009	Festival Cine-Esquema-Novo	Best Actor	Ressaca	Won	
2014	Festa Internacional de Teatro de Angra	Best Actor	A Importância de ser Perfeito	Nominated	
2014	Prêmio CBTIJ de Teatro	Best Supporting Actor	Pedro Malazarte e a Arara Gigante	Nominated	
2015	Prêmio Guarani de Cinema Brasileiro	Best Revelation	Boa Sorte	Nominated	
2018	Grande Prêmio do Cinema Brasileiro	Best Actor	Gabriel and the Mountain	Nominated	
2018	Prêmio Guarani de Cinema Brasileiro	Best Actor	Gabriel and the Mountain	Nominated	
2021	Prêmio Notícias da TV	TV Revelation	Nos Tempos do Imperador	Nominated	
2021	Prêmio Contigo! de TV	TV Revelation	Nos Tempos do Imperador	Nominated	
