= Santos Dumont Collection =

Museu Paulista's collection

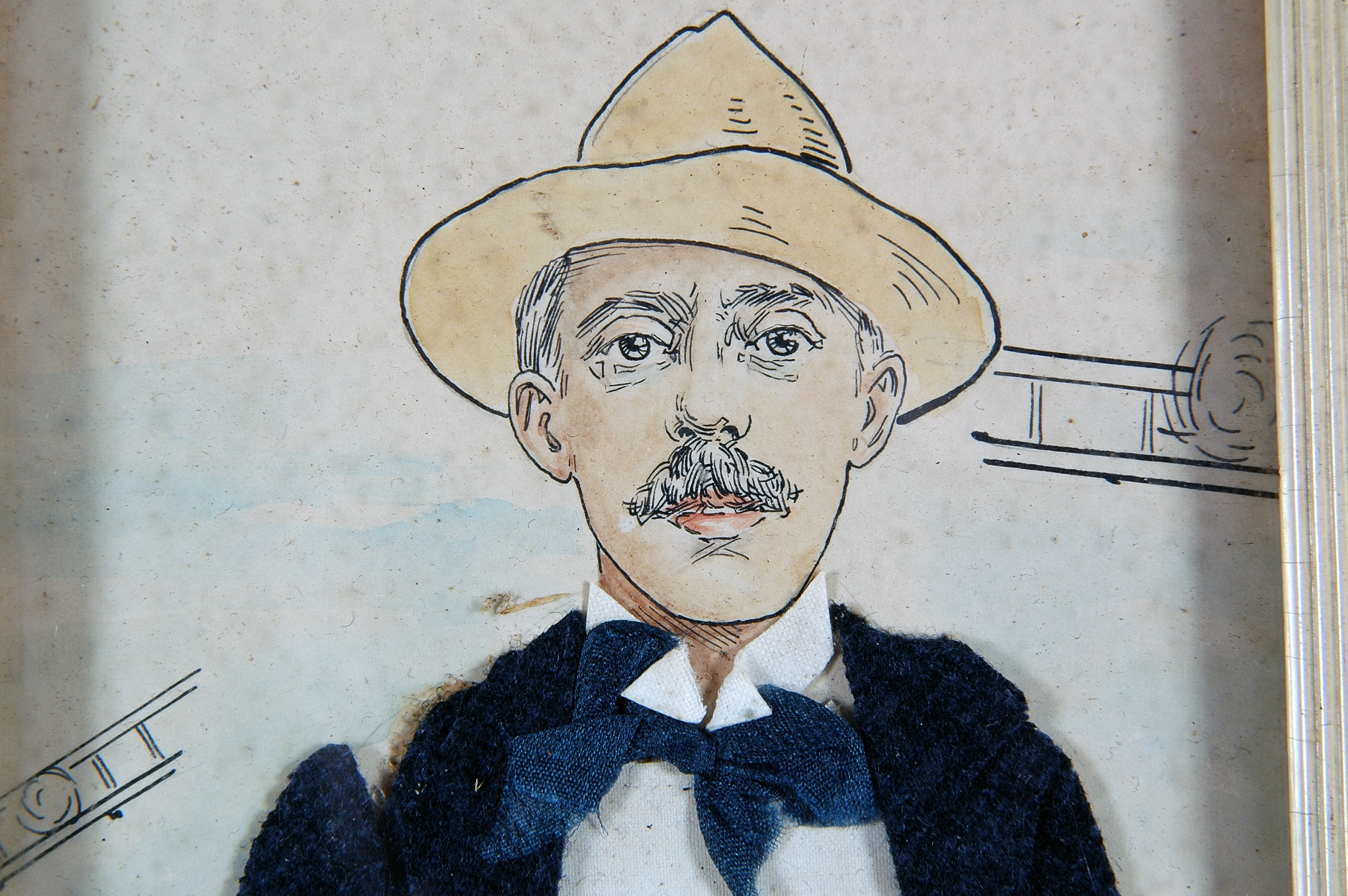

The Santos Dumont Collection, also known as Alberto Santos Dumont Collection, is a collection of about 1,500 items linked to Santos Dumont, under the guard of the Museu Paulista. The collection includes several types of material, including texts, objects and iconographies of the Brazilian inventor, in particular 323 images about the aeronautical trajectory of Santos Dumont. It is one of the best known funds of at least 123 that make up the Coleção do Museu Paulista. The collection was donated by the family after the inventor's death in 1932.

The collection includes prominent items, including: fotopintura Full-size portrait of Santos Dumont, by Giovanni Sarracino, and the short film Santos Dumont Explaining His Air Ship to the Hon. C.S. Rolls, produced by American Mutoscope and Biograph Company.

== Temporary Collection Cession ==
In mid-2005 the Museu Paulista temporarily ceded part of the Santos Dumont collection to the Musée de l'air et de l'espace, in France. At the time, the French museum organized an exhibition entitled "I Navigated through the Air", composed of objects, textual and iconographic documents of Santos Dumont. The exhibition was an initiative of the Ministry of Aeronautics as part of the celebrations of the Year of France in Brazil. The Museu Paulista sent 178 of the 1,600 items in the collection to Paris.
