= Brésil (spherical balloon) =

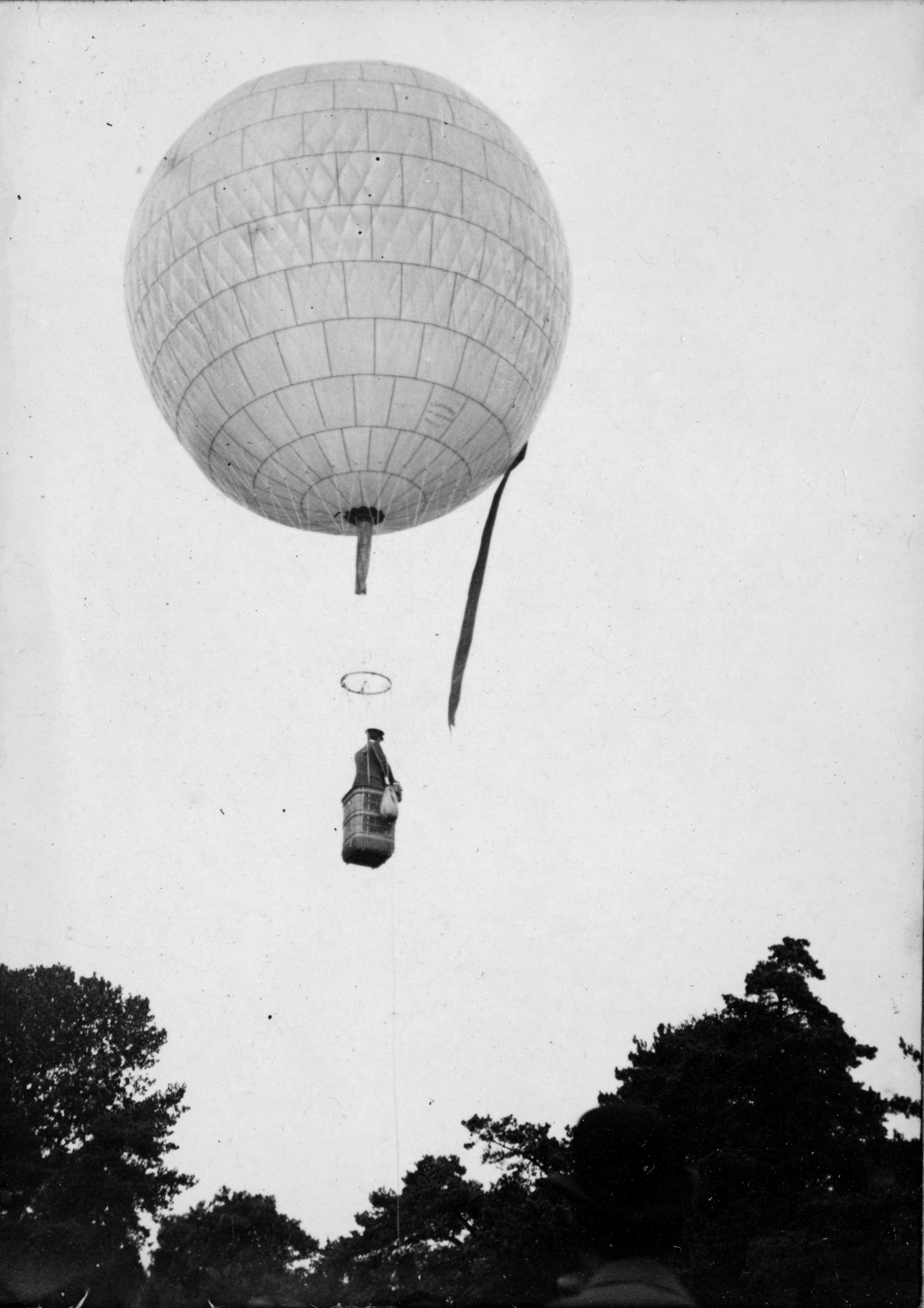
- First ascent

General information
- Type: Hydrogen spherical balloon
- National origin: France
- Manufacturer: Henri Lachambre
- Designer: Alberto Santos-Dumont
- Primary user: Alberto Santos-Dumont
- Number built: 1
- Flights: +200

History
- First flight: 4 July 1898

Brésil was Alberto Santos-Dumont's first spherical balloon. The balloon introduced several innovations in aeronautics and was built for him in France by Henri Lachambre. Its first flight was on 4 July 1898 in Paris. Santos-Dumont made more than 200 flights in the Brésil.

== History ==
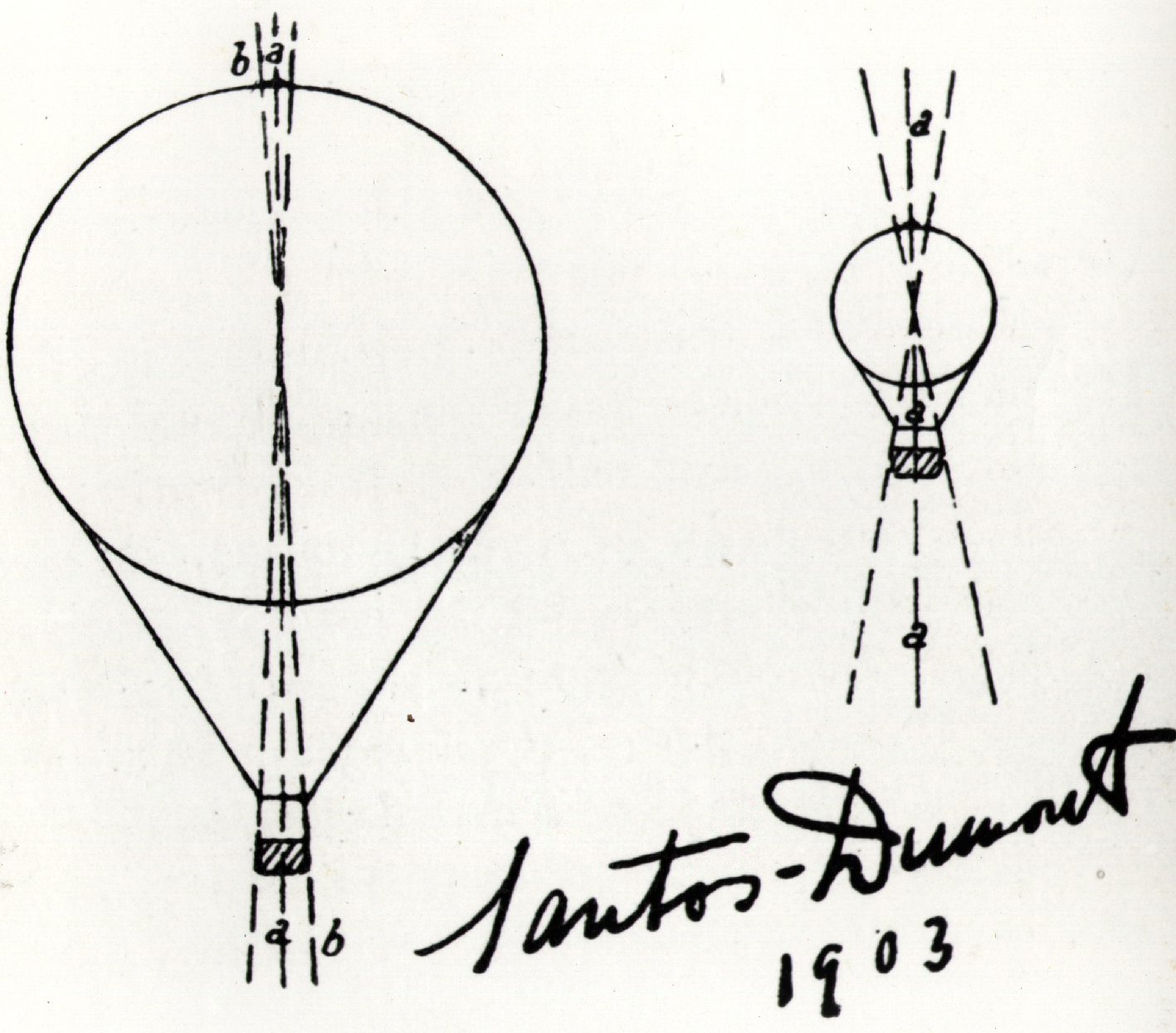
Schematics, by Alberto Santos Dumont.

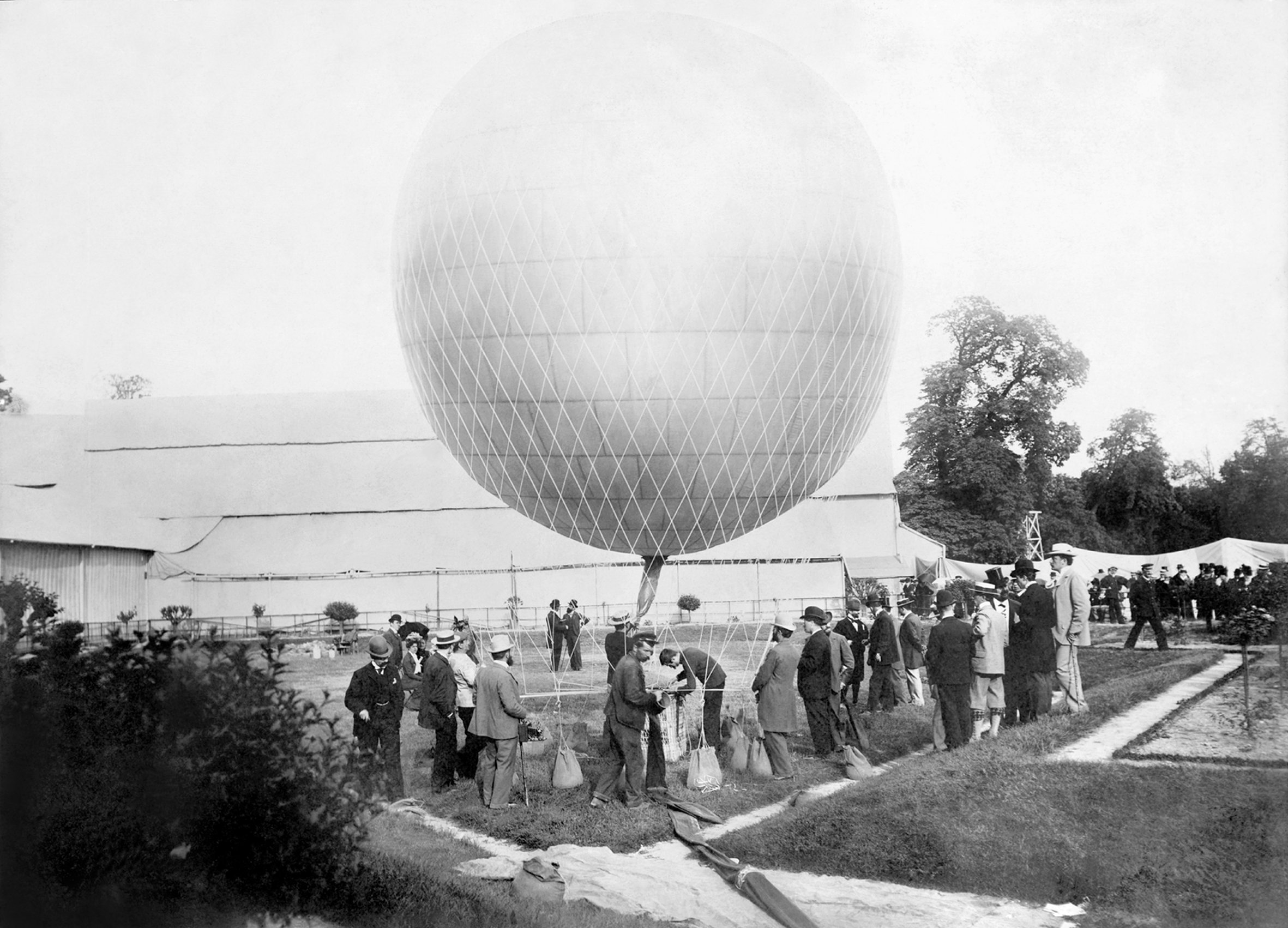
The balloon still at the ground, before its first ascension.

=== Origin ===
After seven years living in Paris and having already performed several ascents in other balloons, Santos Dumont decided to develop his own aircraft to gain experience, as it would be more economical than renting balloons from other builders. He commissioned the balloon manufacturer Henri Lachambre to build what he aimed to be the smallest free balloon ever built, with a 113 m^{3} hydrogen chamber, 6 metres (20 ft) in diameter and a total weight of 27.5 kilograms (61 lb).

Before flying in Brésil, Henri Lachambre's team let Santos Dumont make ascents in both France and Belgium as a way of gaining experience. According to Godin da Fonseca, Santos Dumont was influenced to build his first balloon when he followed the Paris-Amsterdam car race in 1897.

=== Development ===
One of Santos Dumont's main innovations in this aircraft was the use of Japanese silk for the envelope: Japanese silk, despite having 70% of the resistance per unit area of Chinese silk, still had 70% more resistance than necessary. However, the other balloonists feared that the delicacy of the material would cause tears in flight, and Santos Dumont only began to trust the material after several laboratory tests. To maintain stability, Santos Dumont employed a longer length of rope, as shown in the schematic above, where the first figure represents a traditional balloon and the second represents Brésil.

Everything involved was kept as small as possible, even though there was no experience with such a tiny balloon. However, Santos Dumont had to study everything that had been accomplished so far to have confidence in the project. The chamber net was reduced to a mere 2 kg (4.4 lb), while the basket was reduced from 20 kilograms (44 lb) to 6 kg (13 lb). Instead of an anchor, he used a small 3 kg (6.6 lb) harpoon. His critics said the balloon would have no stability, nor any success.

=== Use and legacy ===
Its first flight took place on 4 July 1898, in the Jardin d´Acclimatation in Paris. Santos Dumont described that the balloon "...very maneuverable in the air and very smooth." and that it would not be wrong to say that he carried it in his briefcase. The aeronaut also described that the balloon was "...beautiful in its transparency, like a big soap bubble."

Its use in over 200 flights made Santos Dumont one of the best aeronauts in France and gave him the due flight experience that resulted in the development of other balloons and his airships, as well as attracting attention from other inventors and the European press. The performance of its first two models, "Brésil" and "Amérique", impressed experienced balloonists. Its first airship, the "Nº1", had its first test run on September 18, 1898, three and a half months after the first flight of the "Brésil".

Dias 2006 describes that because of his innovations in developing a balloon of reduced size and cost, Santos Dumont "...would have made a great contribution to aeronautics," even if he had only created the Brésil.

== See also ==
- List of Santos-Dumont aircraft

== Bibliography ==
- Barros, Henrique Lins (2006). "Alberto Santos-Dumont: pioneiro da aviação". Exacta (in Brazilian Portuguese). 4 (1). São Paulo: 35–46. doi:10.5585/exacta.v4i1.643. ISSN 1678-5428. Archived from the original on 2021-09-03.
- Barros, Henrique Lins de; Souza, Renato Vilela Oliveira de (2011). "Santos-Dumont e a solução do voo dirigido: releituras e interpretações da imagem pública de um inventor". Revista Brasileira de História da Ciência (in Brazilian Portuguese). 4 (2). Rio de Janeiro: 239–256. doi:10.53727/rbhc.v4i2.322. S2CID 244679091. Archived from the original on 2019-08-11.
- Brandão, Mauricio Pazini (2018). "The Santos-Dumont legacy to aeronautics" (PDF). ICAS. Archived (PDF) from the original on 2021-09-13.
- Barros, Henrique Lins de (2021). "Santos Dumont: Um pioneiro da segurança de voo e dos ensaios em voo" (PDF) (in Brazilian Portuguese). p. 11. Archived from the original (PDF) on 2021-07-20.
- DaCosta, L.P.; Miragaya, A. (2016). Santos-Dumont, Aviador Esportista: O Primeiro Herói Olímpico do Brasil [Santos-Dumont, Sport Aviator: The First Olympic Hero of Brazil] (PDF) (in Portuguese and English). Rio de Janeiro: Engenho Arte e Cultura. p. 108. ISBN 978-85-69153-00-9. OL 32239895M. Archived (PDF) from the original on 2018-12-27.
- Dias, Adriano Batista (2006). Santos Dumont: O Inovador (in Brazilian Portuguese) (1 ed.). Vieira Lent. p. 160. ISBN 85-88782-35-9. Archived (PDF) from the original on 2022-12-11.
- Morel, Edmar (1974-10-02). "Vida e Morte do Pai da Aviação (II)". O Cruzeiro (in Brazilian Portuguese). Vol. 46, no. 40. pp. 52–57.
- Hoffman, Paul (2003). Wings of Madness (1 ed.). Hyperion. p. 369. ISBN 0-7868-8571-8. OL 15444205M.
- Jorge, Fernando (2018). As Lutas, A Glória e o Martírio de Santos Dumont (in Brazilian Portuguese). Rio de Janeiro: Harper Collins. ISBN 978-85-9508-271-7.
- Pereira, 1º Ten QOCon HIS Elaine Gonçalves da Costa (2022). Santos Dumont: Pai da Aviação (PDF) (in Brazilian Portuguese). Rio de Janeiro: INCAER. p. 50. Archived (PDF) from the original on 2023-05-13.
- Santos-Dumont, A. (1904). Dans L'air (in French) (1 ed.). Paris: Charpentier et Fasquelle. p. 344. OL 6762636M.
- Santos-Dumont (1918). O que eu vi, o que nós veremos (in Brazilian Portuguese). São Paulo. p. 100. OL 32235835M.
