= List of Santos-Dumont aircraft =

Through his career, aviation pioneer Alberto Santos-Dumont designed, built, and demonstrated a variety of types of aircraft—balloons, airships (dirigibles), monoplanes, biplanes, and a helicopter. Research shows that the inventor may have created an even larger number of aircraft.

== List ==
Model	Image
1898
Brésil (balloon) – Japanese silk envelope. 113 m^{3} (4,000 ft^{3}) capacity. Its first flight was on 4 July 1898.	
L'Amérique (balloon) – 500m^{3} of hydrogen and 10 meters in diameter, being able to carry a few passengers, but without control, with which he braved storms and accidents.	
No. 1 (airship) – First flown on 18 September 1898, this had a cylindrical envelope with conical ends containing a ballonet connected to an air pump: 25 m (82 ft) long, 3.5 m (11 ft 6 in) diameter, 180 m^{3} (6,400 ft^{3}) capacity. A square basket was suspended from wooden battens contained in pockets in the envelope, and a silk-covered rudder fitted behind and above the basket. Powered by a De Dion-Bouton tricycle engine (modified to have tandem cylinders) of 3 hp which was mounted outside and in front of the basket driving a small two-bladed propeller. Fore-and-aft trim was achieved by moving a pair of ballast bags. It manoeuvred well, but the ballonet was too small to retain the necessary rigidity of the envelope, and loss of pressure caused it to be wrecked on its second flight on 20 September 1898.	
1899
No. 2 (airship) – An enlargement of No. 1, with a capacity of 200 m^{3} (7,100 ft^{3}). During its first trial on 11 May 1899, it started to rain after inflation, cooling the hydrogen and so causing it to contract. The envelope began to fold in half and was then caught by a gust of wind and blown into nearby trees. It was not repaired.	
No. 3 (airship) – Shorter and of greater diameter than the preceding designs, intended to avoid the loss of shape caused by insufficient internal pressure that had led to their loss. 20.11 m (66.0 ft) long, 7.472 m (24 ft 6.2 in) diameter: capacity 500 m^{3} (18,000 ft^{3}). A bamboo keel was suspended from the envelope, under which the basket was suspended. No ballonet was fitted. It was inflated with coal gas, rather than hydrogen. Its first flight was on 13 November 1899.	
1900
No. 4 (airship) – 39 m (128 ft) long, with a diameter of 5.1 m (17 ft) and a gas capacity of 420 m^{3} (15,000 ft^{3}). No. 4 differed considerably from the previous models, not only in the shape of the envelope, but in the arrangement of the keel, which now carried the motor, a 7 h.p. Buchet, and pilot, who sat on a bicycle saddle. A tractor propeller was mounted at front of the keel. A ballonet and rotary pump was fitted, and Santos Dumont, having acquired a hydrogen generating plant, returned to using hydrogen as a lifting gas. Engine later replaced by a 9 kW (12 hp) four-cylinder air-cooled unit, and envelope lengthened to 33 m (108 ft).	
1901
Le Fatum (balloon) – Le Fatum was a balloon built by Santos Dumont and Emmanuel Aimé for the purpose of conducting experiments in aerostatic equilibrium with the Thermosphére equipment, developed by Emmanuel Aimé. It was an elongated aircraft 7 meters high and 310 cubic meters. The first flight took place on 30 May 1901.	
No. 5 (airship) – Built to make an attempt on the Deutsch de la Meurthe prize for a flight from the Aero-Club de France's flying field at Saint-Cloud to the Eiffel Tower and back within 30 minutes. Used the enlarged envelope from No. 4, from which an elongated triangular-section gondola made of pine was suspended. Other innovations included the use of piano wire to suspend the gondola, greatly reducing drag and the inclusion of water ballast tanks. Powered by a 12 hp 4-cylinder inline air-cooled engine driving a pusher propeller. First flown on 11 July 1901: a lengthy flight was made the next day and an attempt on the de la Meurthe prize on the 13th: the outward flight was accomplished in ten minutes, but the return was hampered by a headwind and took half an hour. On reaching St Cloud the engine failed and the airship was blown into the surrounding trees, damaging the envelope. A second attempt on the prize was made on 8 August but ended in disaster: after reaching the Tower in eight minutes, the airship began losing hydrogen because of a faulty valve. The partial deflation of the envelope caused some of the suspension wires to foul the propeller: Santos-Dumont, therefore, stopped the engine leaving the craft not only unpowered but without any means of inflating the ballonet to maintain the shape of the envelope. Helpless, the craft was blown back towards the Tower and blown onto the roof of the Trocadero Hotel, bursting the envelope with a noise described in some press reports an explosion but which Santos-Dumont likens to a paper bag being burst. Santos-Dumont was left precariously suspended above the courtyard of the hotel but was rescued by the Paris fire brigade. The airship was damaged beyond repair: only the engine was salvaged.	
No. 6 (airship) – Construction started immediately after the loss of No. 5, and completed by early September. Similar to No. 5, but with a larger envelope 22 m (72 ft 2 in) long and capacity of 622 m^{3} (22,000 ft^{3}). Won the Deutsch de la Meurth prize on 19 October 1901.	
1902
No. 7 (airship) – A fast competition airship, built to compete for the aviation prizes on offer at the 1904 St Louis World's Fair. Before the competition the airship's envelope was sabotaged, preventing it from competing. It had a double-thickness varnished silk envelope, 50 m (160 ft) long, 7.92 m (26.0 ft) diameter: capacity 1260 m^{3} (44,500 ft^{3),} and was powered by a 60 hp water-cooled engine, driving two propellers, one at the front and one at the rear of the gondola.	
No. 8 (airship) – It is rumoured that there was no "No. 8" as Santos-Dumont was superstitious about the number. However, D'Orcy's Airchip Manual of 1917 lists a Santos-Dumont No. 8 making only one ascent and being dismantled after proving unsatisfactory. In reality the Nº8 was a copy of the Nº6 and was built for Edward Boyce and had just one flight. An October 1902 article in L'Aérophile says that the airship was made for George Francis Kerr, secretary of the New York Aeroclub, and was flown by Edward Boyce.	
1903
No. 9 Baladeuse – Built as the smallest airship that Santos-Dumont considered practical. As first constructed capacity was 220 m^{3} (7,800 ft^{3}): later enlarged slightly to 261 m^{3} (9,200 ft^{3}). It was also bought by Edward Boyce.	
No. 10 (airship) – Sometimes called the Omnibus, this was intended to carry twelve passengers as well as the pilot and a second crew member. 48 m (157 ft 6 in) long, 8.5 m (27 ft 11 in) diameter, 2,010 m^{3} (71,000 ft^{3}) capacity. The pilot and the 46 hp four-cylinder Clément water-cooled engine, occupied a triangular-section uncovered gondola suspended 2 m (6 ft 7 in) below the envelope, with a fabric covered propeller at either end: a second gondola suspended 10 m (32 ft 9 in) below this held the three baskets for the passengers and an assistant pilot. Made only test flights.	
1905
No. 11 (balloon) – No. 11 was a dirigible balloon with an envelope 34 meters long, a volume of 1,200 m', with a 16HP engine, being capable of holding five people (including the pilot). It was brought by an American.	
No. 12 (helicopter) – Twin 6 m (19 ft 8 in) diameter rotors made of varnished silk stretched over a bamboo framework. Powered by a 25 hp Antoinette engine.	
No. 13 (airship) – A curious composite craft, consisting of an ovoid hydrogen-filled envelope 19 m long, 14.5 m diameter and capacity 1902 m^{3}, with a second conical envelope of 171 m^{3} attached underneath: this was filled with air which could be heated by a burner. Destroyed in the hangar during a storm.	
Nº 14-a (airship) — An airship 41 meters long, 3.4 in diameter, 186 in cubic footage, and with a 14 HP engine. It made a short flight on 12 June 1905.	
Nº 14-b (airship) — Modification of the previous airship due to lack of stability. 20m long, 6 in diameter and a 16 HP engine. It was tested between 21–25 August 1905.	
1906
Oiseau de Proie (14-bis) (airplane) — Created in June 1906, it received the name 14-Bis due to the fact that it was attached to the 14-airship.	
Oiseau de Proie I (airplane) — Aircraft 4m high, 10m long, 12 span, two-wheel landing gear and a 24 HP Levavasseur engine. Tested on a steel cable and pulled by an ass on 29 July 1906, to test the aircraft's controls. In August 1906 a small rear wheel was added. Tested on 21 August 1906, the engine shaft broke. On the 22nd the propellers reached 1,400 revolutions per minute. On the 23rd, it reached 25 km/h (15 mph) on grass. On 3 September 1906, he put in a 50 HP engine and on 4 and 7 September 1906, it reached 35 km/h (22 mph) on the lawn and jumped for 7 meters.	
Deux Amériques (balloon) – Spherical balloon with horizontal propellers used in the Gordon Bennett Cup.	
Oiseau de Proie II (airplane) — Modification of the previous model with varnished wings and without the rear wheel. It took off on 23 October 1906, at 16h45m, staying 6s in the air, reaching a height of 3m and crossing 60 meters, winning the Archdeacon Award.	
Oiseau de Proie III (airplane) — In November 1906 it flew for 220 meters, having "...octagonal airfoils between the wings."	
1907
Oiseau de Proie IV (airplane) — It flew 30 meters in April 1907. On 4 April, after flying about 50 meters, it crashed, being destroyed.	
No. 15 (aeroplane) – Tractor configuration biplane, powered by a 50 hp Antoinette engine mounted above the upper wing. High aspect ratio wings spanning 11 m with a chord of only 60 cm (2.0 ft), giving a surface area of 13 m^{2}, divided into three bays by full-chord vertical surfaces. Pronounced dihedral like the 14bis, fitted with mid-gap ailerons in front of the wings. The wings were skinned with 3 mm Okoume plywood. Undercarriage consisted of a single wheel mounted at the junction of the forward lower wing spars and a tailskid. Biplane tail carried on a pair of bamboo booms placed one above the other and laterally braced to the wings by steel cables. Damaged during taxying trials on 27 March 1907,: subsequently repaired and fitted with a 100 Antoinette V-16, but never flown successfully.	
No. 16 (hybrid airship) – 21 m long, 3 m diameter: capacity 99 m^{3}. Fitted with a forward-mounted hexagonal elevator and a central 4 m span rectangular lifting surface, this was a hybrid airship incapable of flight relying solely on aerostatic buoyancy, instead requiring aerodynamic lift to fly. Tested unsuccessfully on 8 July 1907.	
Nº 17 — Similar to number 15, but with a 100 hp Levavasseur engine, which was never tested. It was known as "La Sauterelle".
No. 18 – Not an aircraft, but a propeller-driven "hydro-flotteur" powered by a V-16 Antoinette engine driving a three-bladed propeller, and resting on an elongated central float stabilised by smaller floats either side.	
Nº 19 Demoiselle – The first Demoiselle.	
Nº 19Bis Demoiselle— Built in November 1907, it had reinforced wings and an engine on the underside. It was never tested.	
1908
Nº 20 Demoiselle — A modification of No. 19, considered to be the first practical ultralight aircraft.	
1909
Nº 21 Demoiselle — Equivalent to the previous model, but with a different engine.	
Nº 22 Demoiselle – Use of what had been learned previously.	
