= Santos-Dumont number 6 =

1900s airship

Santos-Dumont No. 6
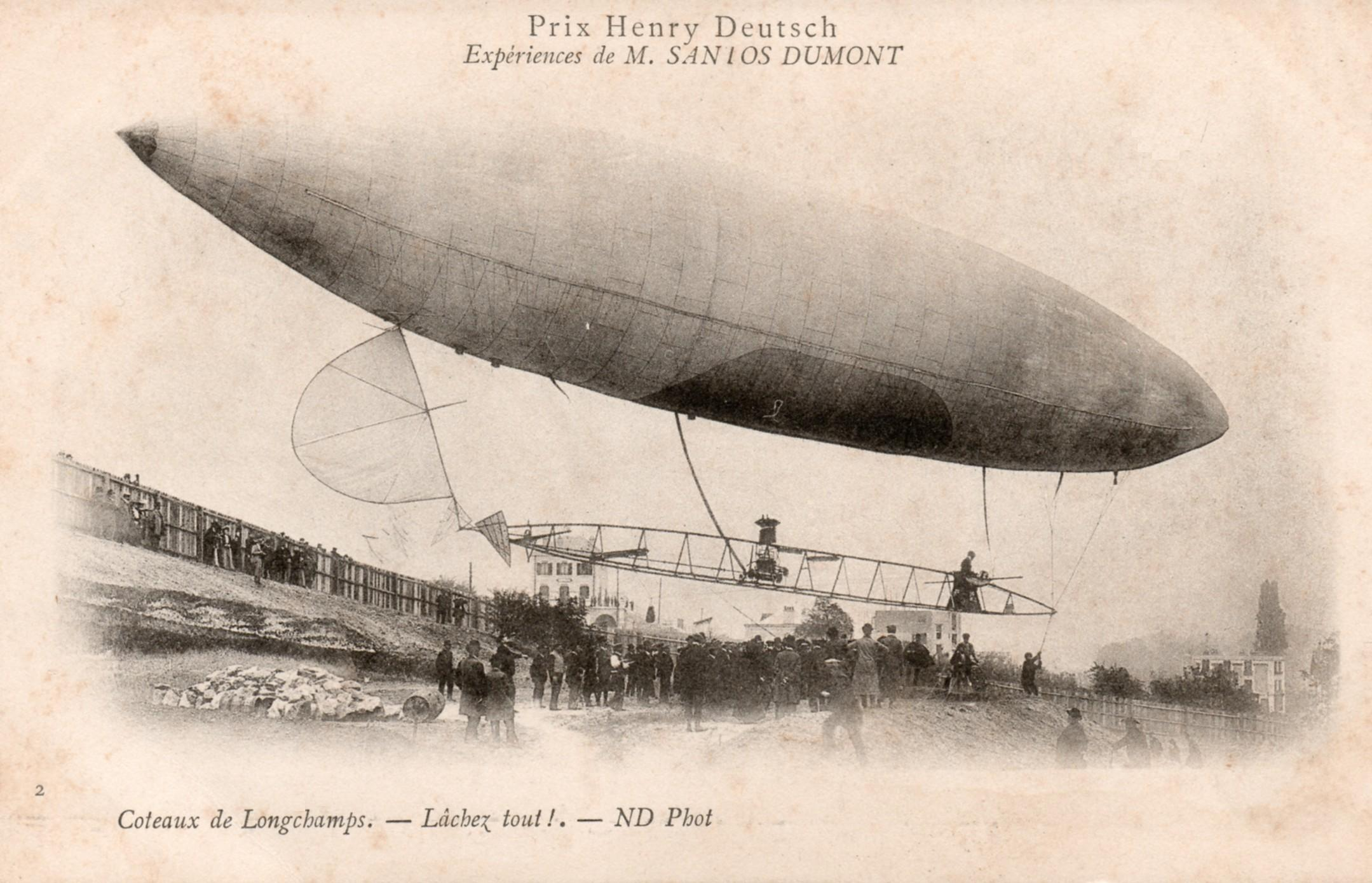

General information
- Type: Experimental airship
- National origin: France
- Manufacturer: Alberto Santos-Dumont
- Number built: 1

History
- First flight: 30 August 1901; 123 years ago
- Developed from: Santos-Dumont number 5

The Santos-Dumont No. 6 was an airship designed and built by the Brazilian pioneer aviator Alberto Santos-Dumont. In 1901 it was used by him to win the Deutsch de la Meurthe prize for a flight from Parc Saint Cloud to the Eiffel Tower and back within thirty minutes.

== Background ==
In April 1900 Henri Deutsch de la Meurthe offered the Deutsch de la Meurthe prize, also simply known as the "Deutsch prize", of 100,000 francs to the first machine capable of flying from the Aéro-Club de France's flying field at Parc Saint Cloud to the Eiffel Tower in Paris and back in less than thirty minutes. The winner of the prize needed to maintain an average ground speed of at least 22 km/h (14 mph) to cover the round trip distance of 11 km (6.8 mi) in the allotted time. The prize was to be available from May 1, 1900 to November 1, 1901.

To win the prize, Alberto Santos-Dumont decided to build dirigible No. 5, a larger craft than his earlier designs. On August 8, 1901 during one of his attempts, the airship began to lose gas, causing the envelope to lose shape and making it necessary to shut down the engine, which also powered the ventilator which inflated the internal ballonet. It started to descend and was unable to clear the roof of the Trocadero Hotel. Santos-Dumont was left hanging in a basket from the side of the hotel. With the help of firemen he escaped without injury, but the airship was a write-off, only the engine being salvaged.

== Design ==
After the wreck of No.5 Santos Dumont immediately started work on a replacement, which was finished by September 1. Similar to the No.5 but slightly larger, it had an envelope of varnished silk from which an elongated uncovered gondola was suspended by steel wires. The envelope was fitted with a single manoeuvering valve and two automatic pressure-relief valves: in addition there were two ripping panels to enable hydrogen to be rapidly vented in an emergency. The triangular section gondola was constructed of lengths of pine connected with aluminium sockets and braced with piano wire. The 12 hp (9 kW) engine was mounted in the centre of the gondola and drove a two-bladed pusher propeller at the rear via a long driveshaft. The pilot stood in a small balloon basket at the front. The triangular rudder was carried between the rear of the gondola and the envelope.

== Operational history ==
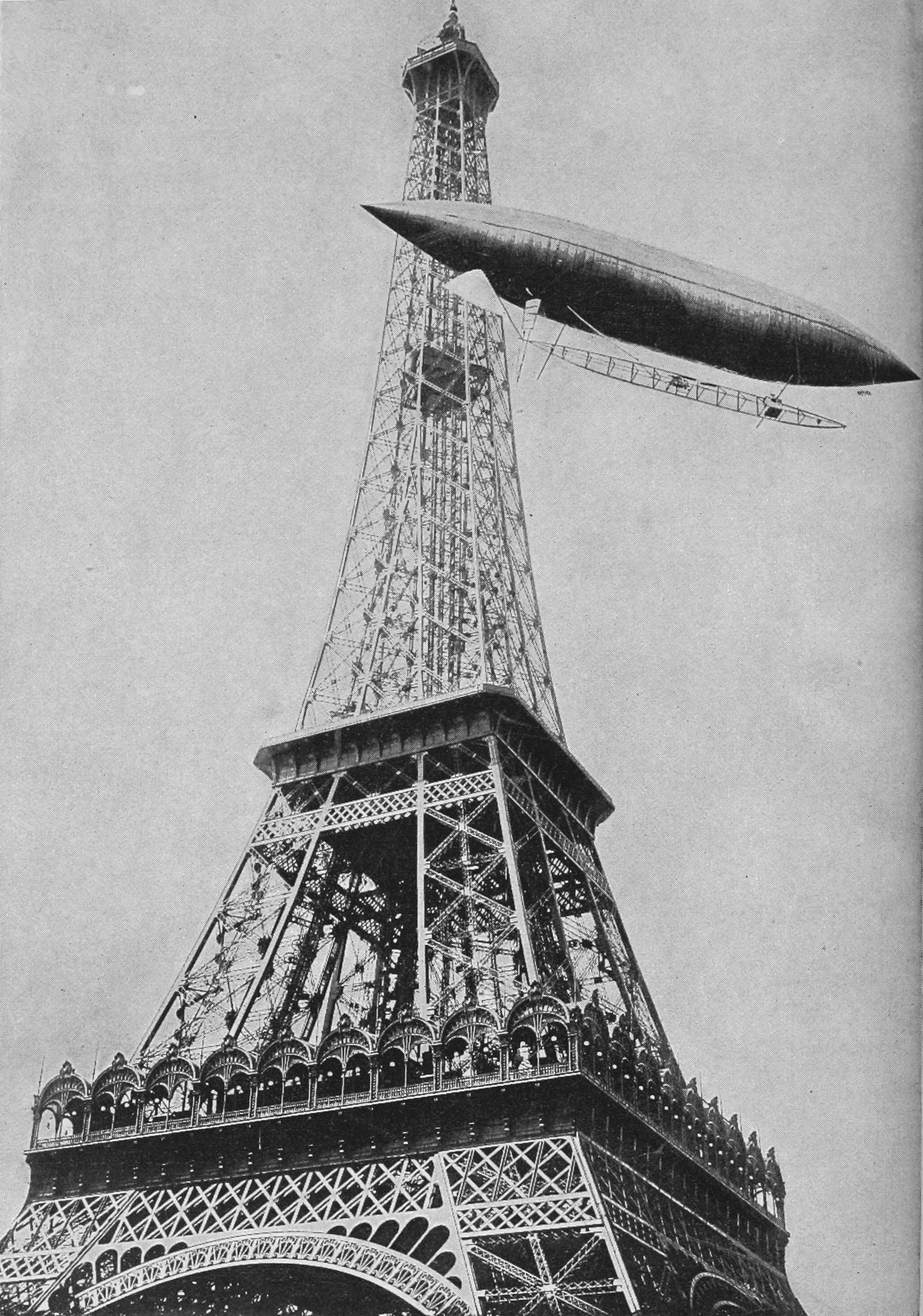
Often published as a photo of Santos-Dumont during the prize-winning flight, this is actually an earlier attempt using No.5

After some tethered trials on September 5 Santos Dumont made his first flight in the airship on September 6. After an hour and a half of trials at the Longchamps racecourse he flew the craft to meet friends at a nearby restaurant, but on attempting to return to his base at Chalais-Meudon a series of mishaps ended with the gondola being damaged. However it was soon repaired and a first attempt at the Deutsch de la Meurth prize was made on September 19, ending when the airship was blown against some trees during preliminary trials, resulting in the envelope being punctured. Another more successful flight was made on October 10, followed by an attempt on the prize the following day, which was frustrated by technical problems. Another successful trial flight followed on the 13th.

Further flying was ruled out by the weather until October 19, when Santos-Dumont took off from Saint-Cloud at 2:42 pm. With the wind behind him, he reached the Eiffel Tower in nine minutes, but on the return journey suffered an engine failure. To restart the engine, he had to climb back over the gondola rail without a safety harness. The attempt was successful, and he reached the finish line after 29 minutes 30 seconds. However, there was a short delay before his mooring line was secured, and at first the adjudicating committee refused him the prize, despite de la Meurthe, who was present, declaring himself satisfied. This caused a public outcry from the crowds watching the flight, as well as comment in the press. However a face-saving compromise was reached, and Santos-Dumont was awarded the prize. In a charitable gesture, he gave half the prize to his technicians and donated the other half to the poor of Paris.

After winning the De la Meurthe prize Santos-Dumont took the airship to Monte Carlo in January 1902, making use of the newly built balloon shed belonging to the Prince of Monaco on the Boulevard de la Condamine.

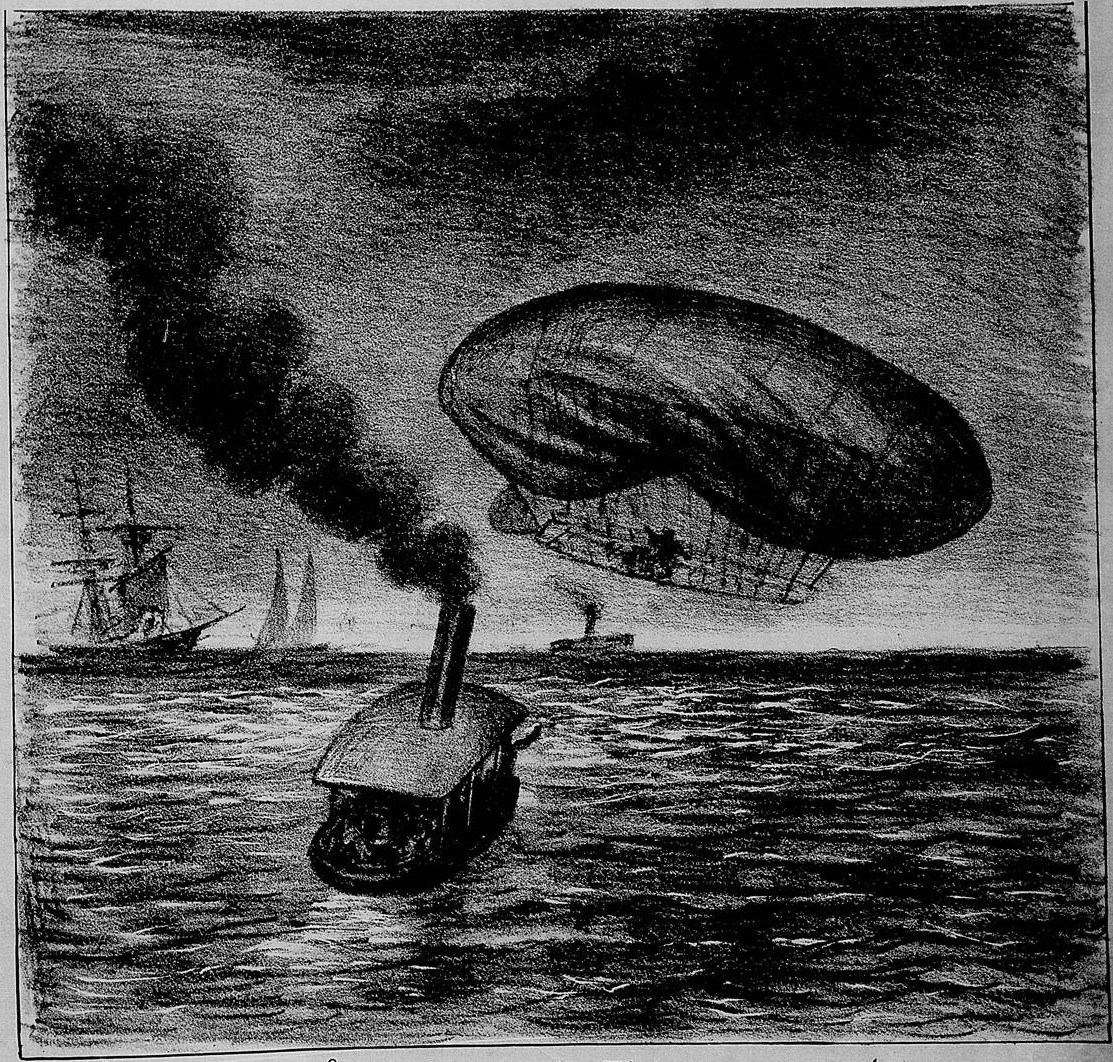
Santos Dumont's accident on February 14, 1902.

It was badly damaged on February 14, 1902 when superheating of the hydrogen caused the airship, already in a nose-up attitude, to pitch up even further, causing some of the wires supporting the gondola to break. Some of these then began to get entangled with the propeller. Santos-Dumont was forced to stop the motor and in order to prevent himself being blown out to sea, vented hydrogen to bring the airship down in the sea.

The airship was salvaged and returned to Paris where it was repaired, and on Easter Monday (i.e., on March 30, 1902) it was placed on exhibition in the Concert Room in the Crystal Palace Park in south London, where it attracted 10,000 visitors on the first day it was shown. It remained on display throughout April and May, after which a series of exhibition flights were announced. During the static exhibition the envelope had been inflated with air, and when inflated with hydrogen it was found that the envelope had deteriorated and so the flights were cancelled. The airship was on display in New York during the whole summer of 1902, a plan for a trip to the Statue of Liberty and back being likewise abandoned.

== Specifications ==
Data from l'Aérophile, August 1901, pp. 210-2; Santos-Dumont, My Airships, London, 1904, pp. 180-186

General characteristics

- Length: 33 m (108 ft 3 in)
- Diameter: 6 m (19 ft 8 in)
- Volume: 630 m^{3} (22,000 cu ft)
- Powerplant: 1 × Buchet 4 cylinder inline water-cooled piston engine, 8.9 kW (12 hp)
- Propellers: 2-bladed

Performance

- Maximum speed: 40 km/h (25 mph, 22 kn) (approx)
