= Santos Dumont House Museum =

Museum in Petrópolis, Brazil

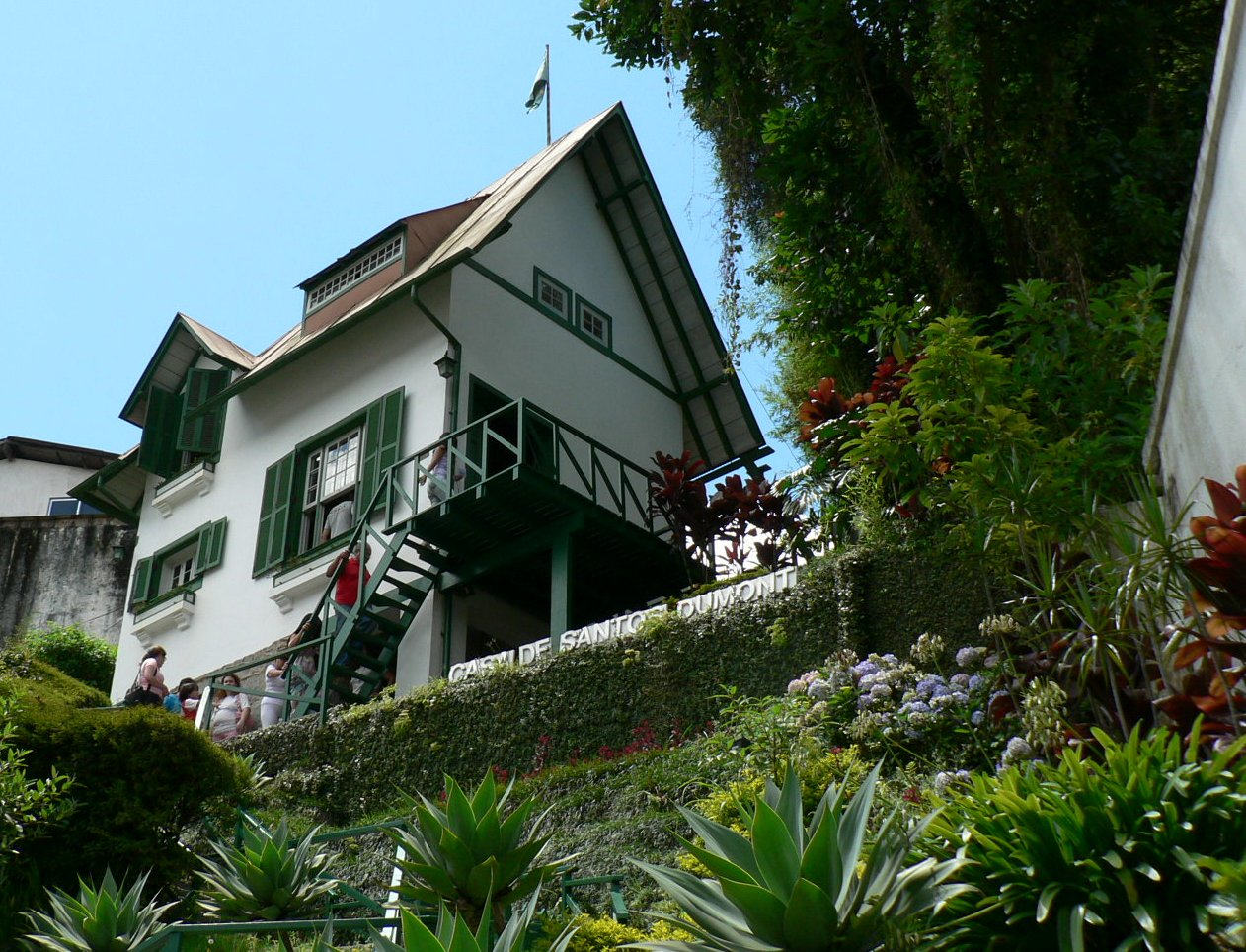
- Established: 1932 (94 years ago)
- Location: Petrópolis, Rio de Janeiro, Brazil
- Coordinates: 22°30′37″S 43°11′03″W
- Type: Biographical museum Writer's home Historic house museum

Santos Dumont Museum House (Portuguese: Museu Casa de Santos Dumont), better known as The Enchanted (Portuguese: A Encantada), is a museum located in the municipality of Petrópolis, in the state of Rio de Janeiro, Brazil.

The house is a picturesque residence built in 1918 for Aeronaut Alberto Santos-Dumont on a steep hillside near the centre of the city. The street is Rua do Encanto, meaning "Enchanted Street", so the house was nicknamed A Encantada, "The Enchanted". It was constructed with the help of engineer Eduardo Pederneiras.

The house has some unusual innovations. Most notably, one of his inventions was the shower with hot water, the only one of Brazil at that time, being heated with alcohol. The external staircase of the house can only be climbed starting with the right foot, while the internal staircase can only started with the left foot. The internal architecture of the house is unusual for the period in that no partitions are used between the rooms. The house also has no kitchen, Santos-Dumont having all his meals delivered from the restaurant of the Palace Hotel, which at that time was across the street. It is now the Catholic University of Petrópolis.

The house has three floors, plus an observatory on the roof.

Santos-Dumont's second book, O que eu vi, o que nós veremos, was written in the house in 1918.

After his death, the house was donated to the City Hall of Petrópolis by his nephews so that "an institution was installed that would maintain his memory."

On July 14, 1952, the house was registered by IPHAN and today is part of the National Historical and Artistic Heritage.
