= Olívia Guedes Penteado =

Brazilian art patron (1872–1934)

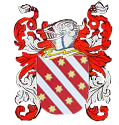
Coat of arms of the Barros Penteados family

Olívia Guedes Penteado (12 March 1872 – 9 June 1934) was a Brazilian art patron and philanthropist who established the Salón de Arte Moderna in São Paulo. She was a motivating force for the country's modernism movement. Penteado was a friend of key artists of this movement, such as Anita Malfatti, Tarsila do Amaral, and Heitor Villa-Lobos. Her niece, Yolanda Penteado, was also an art patron.

== Biography ==
Born in Campinas in 1872, she was the daughter of the Baron of Piratininga, José Guedes de Souza, a powerful coffee rancher in the Mogi Mirim, and Carolina Leopoldina de Almeida e Souza. Her family descended from Fernão Dias Pais, Amador Bueno, Tibiriçá, and João Ramalho. Penteado spent her childhood on her father's property, Fazenda da Barra, in Mogi Mirim. She studied at home with private tutors and for a time at Colegio Bojanas. The family later moved to São Paulo, when her father became Baron Piratininga.

While living in Paris, Penteado met modernist friends, returning to Brazil with copies of the work of Pablo Picasso and Marie Laurencin, among others. Penteado established the Salón de Arte Moderna in 1923, when she returned to live in Brazil.

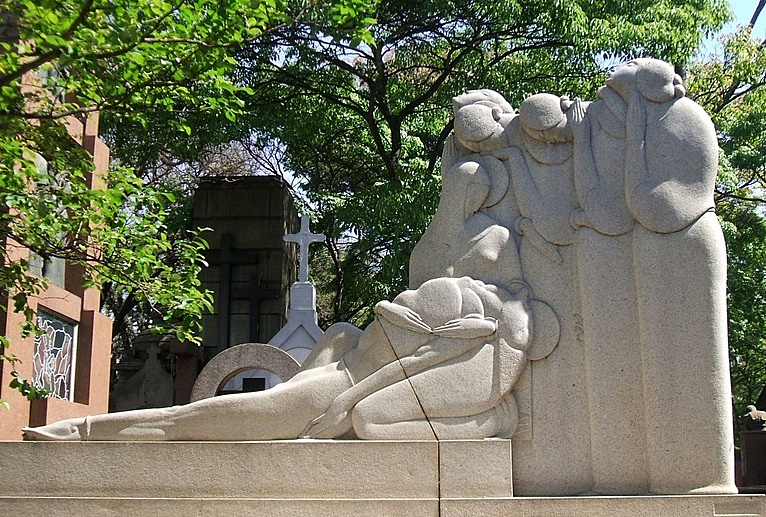
Tomb of Olivia Guedes Penteado by Victor Brecheret

At the age of 16, Penteado married her first cousin, Inacio Leite Penteado. She fought for women's suffrage, and actively participated in the Constitutionalist Revolution of 1932. She died of appendicitis in São Paulo in 1934, and was buried in the Consolação Cemetery, São Paulo, her tomb ornamented with a sculpture titled "Sepulture", sculpted by Victor Brecheret. A railway station stop and a street are both named in her honor.
