= Santos-Dumont 14-bis =

1906 aircraft by Brazilian aviation pioneer Alberto Santos-Dumont

14-bis
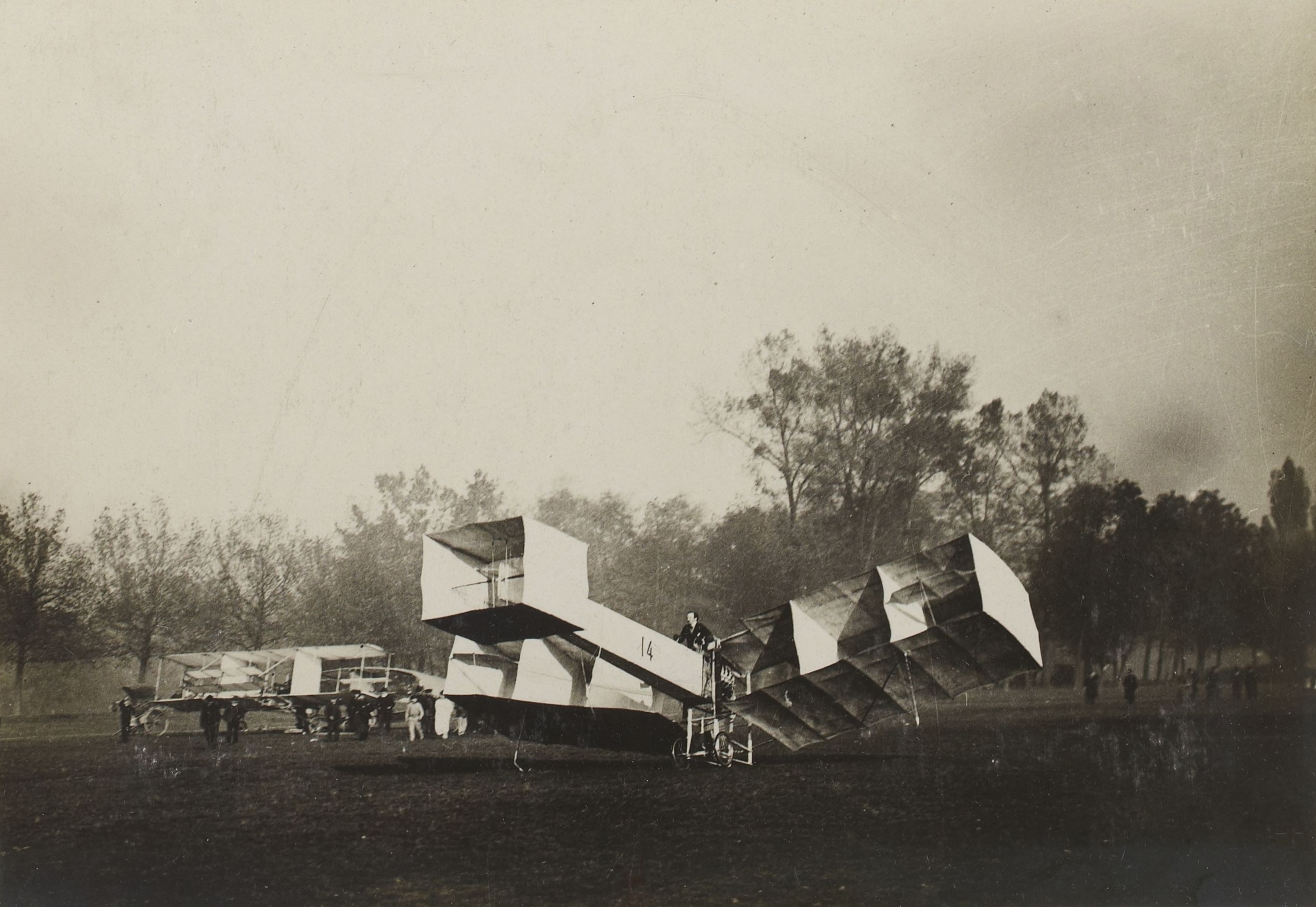
- The 14-bis in its final form in November 1906, with octagonal-planform interplane ailerons

General information
- Type: Experimental aircraft
- Designer: Alberto Santos-Dumont
- Number built: 1

History
- First flight: 23 October 1906

The 14-bis (French: Quatorze-bis; (Portuguese: Quatorze-bis; English: Fourteen-again, approximating "14B"), also known as Oiseau de proie ("bird of prey" in French), was a pioneer era, canard-style biplane designed and built by Brazilian aviation pioneer Alberto Santos-Dumont. In 1906, near Paris, the 14-bis made a manned powered flight that was the first to be publicly witnessed by a crowd and also filmed. It was the first powered flight aside from short powered "hops" by Clément Ader and Traian Vuia.

== Background ==
In June 1905, French aviator Gabriel Voisin had flown a glider towed by a fast boat on the Seine River, making a flight of over 150 metres (500 feet). The glider's wing and tail were made up of Hargrave cells, a box kite–like structure that provided a degree of inherent stability. This established the Hargrave cell as a configuration useful not only for kites but also for heavier-than-air aircraft. Santos-Dumont was living in Paris at the time, and was one of the most active "aeronauts" in Europe, having developed a series of non-rigid airships that displayed unparalleled agility, speed, endurance, and ease of control. Santos-Dumont met Voisin at the end of 1905, and commissioned him to help him construct an aircraft with the intention of attempting to win one of the prizes for heavier-than-air flights offered by the Aéro-Club de France to promote the development of heavier-than-air aviation in France. These included the Coupe Ernest Archdeacon prize of a silver trophy and 1,500 franc for the first flight of 25 m (82 ft) and another prize of 1,500 francs for the first flight of 100 m (330 ft).

== Design ==
Santos-Dumont supervised construction of a Hargrave-cell biplane powered by an Antoinette 8V V8 engine. The wings, each made up of three cells, were at the back and configured with pronounced dihedral to make the aircraft laterally stable. The 37-kilowatt (50-horsepower) Antoinette liquid-cooled, fuel-injected V8 engine was mounted at the extreme rear end of the fuselage, itself located almost vertically equidistant between the biplane wing panels' wing roots, with the rear-mount engine driving a pusher propeller, and the pilot stood in a wicker basket immediately in front of the engine. A movable box kite-style cell at the nose, pivoted on a universal joint within it and controlled by cables was intended for yaw and pitch control. This layout would later come to be called a "canard configuration". It was constructed from bamboo and pine joined by aluminium sockets and was covered with Japanese silk.

== Operational history ==
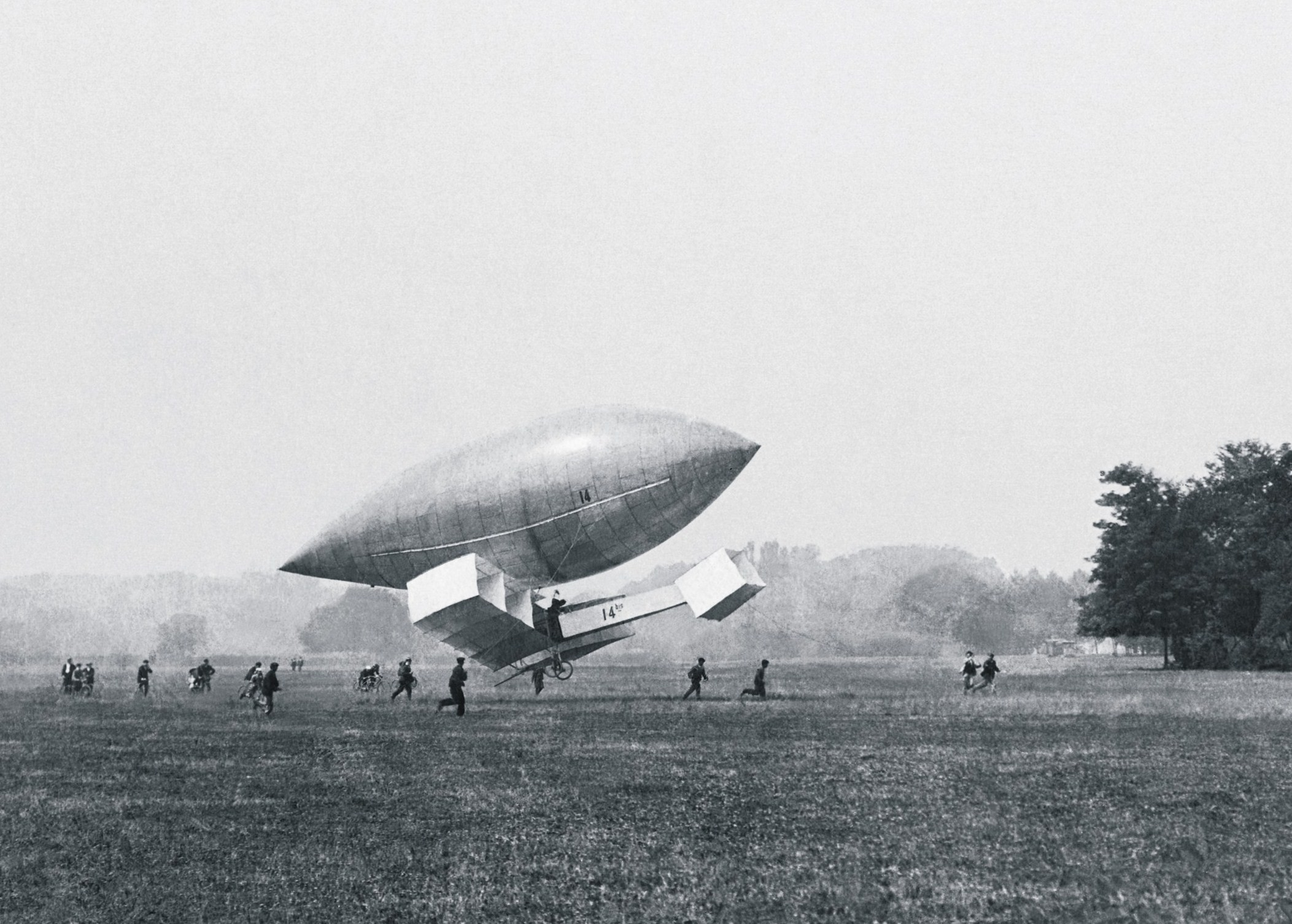
The 14-bis at the Château de Bagatelle grounds, suspended from the envelope of Santos-Dumont's No. 14 airship

The first trials of the aircraft were made on 22 July 1906 at Santos-Dumont's grounds at Neuilly, where it had been assembled. In order to simulate flight conditions, Santos-Dumont attached the aircraft under his latest non-rigid airship, the Number 14, which is why the aircraft came to be known as the "14-bis". The aircraft was then transported to the grounds of the Château de Bagatelle in the Bois de Boulogne, where there was more space. The forces imposed by the aircraft pulled dangerously at the airship's envelope, nearly tearing it and only allowing limited control. The danger of these tests caused Santos-Dumont and his team to quickly abandon them, although some useful information was obtained that led to adjustments in the balance and weight distribution of the aircraft.

Further trials were made with the aircraft hung from a rope attached to pulleys running along a 60 m (200 ft) long steel cable slung between two posts, one 13.5 m (44 ft) high and the other 7 m (23 ft) high, much like a zip-line or tyrolienne of today.

The first free-flight trials of the 14-bis took place at the Polo Ground in the Bois de Boulogne on 21 August, but were halted by damage to the newly fitted aluminium-bladed propeller, which replaced one with silk-covered wooden blades. After repairs another trial took place the following day; although the nosewheel left the ground, the aircraft had insufficient power to take off, and Santos-Dumont decided to replace the engine with an already proven 37 kW (50 hp) Antoinette 8V. Trials resumed on 4 September without great success, and on 7 September, after the propeller was damaged, a new slightly larger one was fitted.

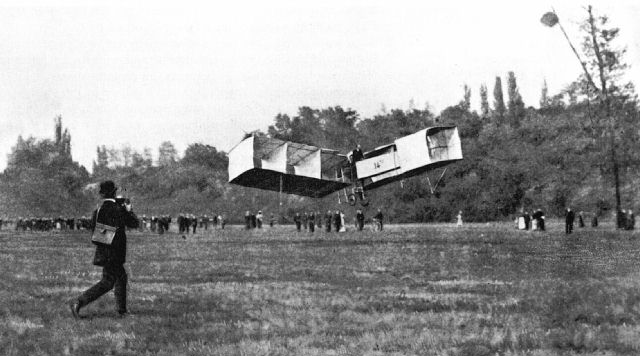
The 14-bis flying over the Château de Bagatelle grounds on 23 October 1906. Note lack of ailerons, which were added later for lateral control.

On 13 September 1906 Aéro-Club de France observers gathered to witness an attempt to make a prize-winning flight. The aircraft failed to take off during a first attempt, but during the second it lifted and flew between 4 and 7 metres (13 and 23 ft) at an altitude of about 70 centimetres (28 in). The aircraft then landed in a nose-up attitude, breaking the propeller and bringing an end to the day's experiments. This brief flight did not qualify for any prize, but earned Santos-Dumont an ovation from the crowd.

On 23 October, after a series of engine tests and high-speed ground runs (one of which ended as one wheel came loose, but this was quickly fixed), Santos-Dumont made a flight of over 50 metres (160 ft) at an altitude of 3–5 m (10–16 1/2 ft). This earned Santos-Dumont the first of the aviation prizes, 3,000 francs for a flight of 25 m (82 ft) or more.

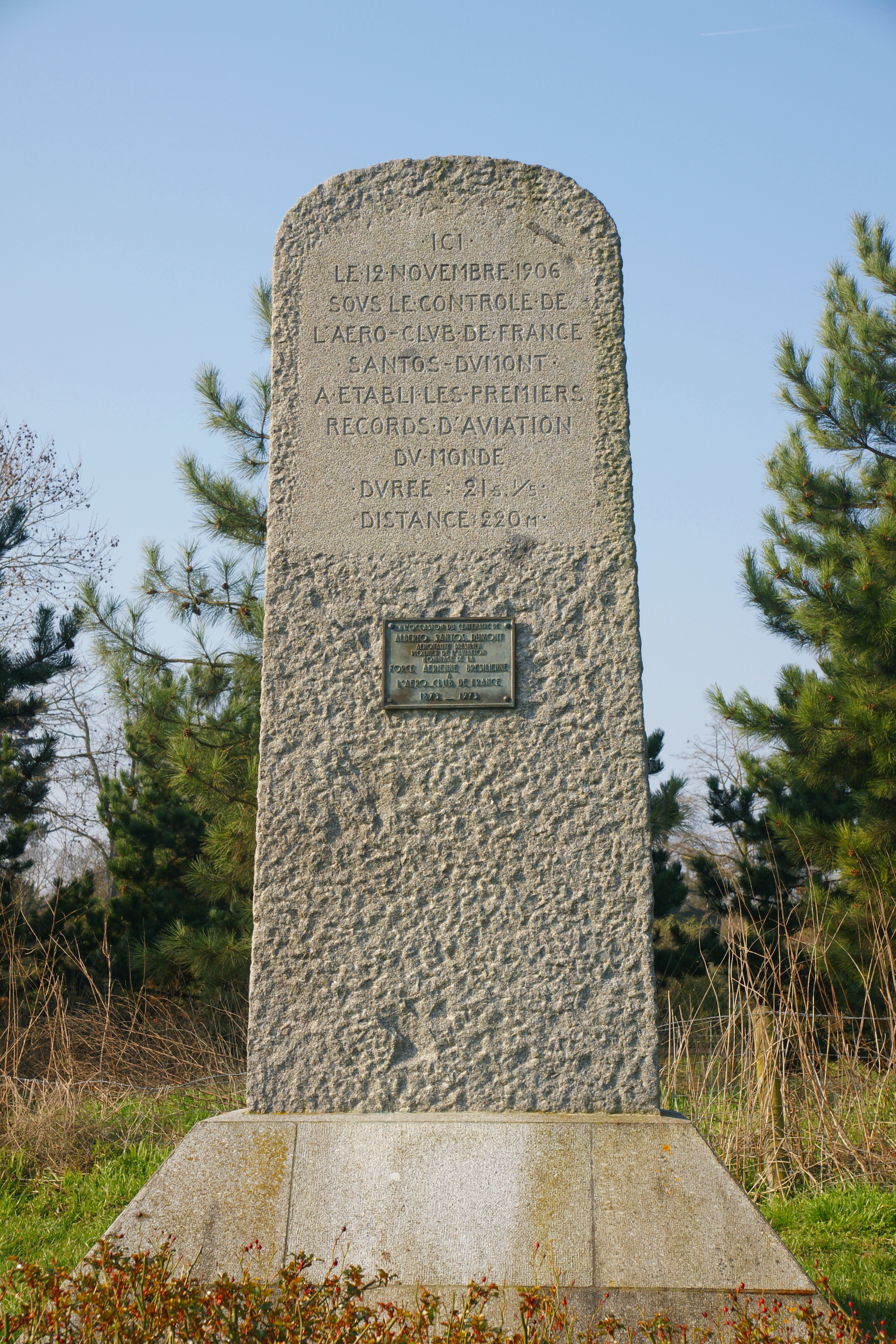
Monument at the Château's grounds, to Santos-Dumont's flight of 12 November 1906 and its first world record

This landing damaged the aircraft slightly, but Santos-Dumont announced that he should be ready to attempt the 100-metre (330 ft) prize on 12 November 1906.

=== Concluding flights, and the inclusion of ailerons ===
Following the airframe damage from the 23 October flights, the 14-bis was repaired, and octagonal ailerons, with a hinging and mounting location similar to Robert Esnault-Pelterie's 1904-era biplane glider design, were added to the middle of each outermost wing cell, with the surfaces pivoting between the outermost forward struts, again like Pelterie's 1904 glider. These were operated by cables attached to the shoulders of the pilot's flightsuit, somewhat like the hip-movement wing-warping control of the Wright Flyer. On the morning of 12 November 1906 the aviation community of France assembled at the Château de Bagatelle's grounds to witness Santos-Dumont's next attempt. As Santos-Dumont allowed the 14-bis to run down the field, a car drove alongside, from which Henry Farman dropped a plate each time he observed the wheels of the aircraft leave the ground or touch down again. The first attempt achieved a 5-second flight of about 40 m (130 ft) around 40 cm off the ground, and the second two brief flights of 40 and 50 m (160 ft). A hurried landing due to the proximity of some trees after this second attempt damaged the wheel axles, and these were fixed during a lunch break. In the afternoon, further flights of 50 meters and then 82 m (269 ft) (achieving about 40 km/h), this one interrupted by the proximity of a polo barrier. As the sun set, Santos-Dumont attempted one more flight. In order to ensure he would not hit the spectators, who by this time were all over the field, he pulled up while flying over them. After 22 seconds, he cut the engine and glided in to land. He had flown for 220 meters (over 700 ft), qualifying for the second aviation prize offered for heavier-than-air-aircraft, 1,000 francs for a flight of 100 meters or more. The next notable Santos-Dumont flights were made a year later in November 1907, flying his No. 19 Demoiselle.

== 14-bis vs. Wright Flyer ==
Some contend that the 14-bis, rather than the 1903 Wright Flyer, was the first true airplane. For takeoff the 1903 Wright Flyer used a launch rail and a wheeled dolly which was left on the ground; the airplane landed on skids due to the sandy landing surface at Kitty Hawk. After 1903 the Wrights used a catapult to assist most takeoffs of their 1904 and 1905 airplanes. The Santos-Dumont 14-bis did not use a catapult and ran on wheels located at the back of the aircraft – said to have been adopted by Santos-Dumont for his 14-bis after personally witnessing Traian Vuia's contemporary, four-wheeled aircraft's flight attempts earlier in 1906 in the western suburbs of Paris, not far from the Château de Bagatelle's grounds – with a "nose-skid" under the front of the 14-bis' fuselage.

In contrast to that view, on 5 October 1905, Wilbur Wright made a circling flight of 38.9 km (24 mi) in 39 minutes 23 seconds, over Huffman Prairie near Dayton, Ohio, a year before Santos-Dumont's 50 m (160 ft) flight earned him his first aviation award. Furthermore, written and photographic documentation by the Wrights authenticated by historians shows that the 1903 Wright Flyer accomplished takeoffs in a strong headwind without a catapult and made controlled and sustained flight; nearly three years before Santos-Dumont made his first heavier-than-air takeoff. In addition, although the Hargrave cells gave the 14-bis lateral stability, there was no lateral control, which is required for making turns, rolling, and banking. The Wright design used wing-warping for lateral control, something which they had been using since 1899 in their gliders. Without lateral control, the aircraft merely hops, or lifts off the ground and returns to it in a straight line – although rudder input, coupled with the very generous dihedral of the 14-bis' wings, would in fact give a fair degree of roll control. Dumont added octagonal ailerons to the 14-bis for lateral control in November 1906 (see media pictures below).

== Specifications ==
Data from Opdycke, French Aeroplanes before the Great War; Gray, The 1906 Santos-Dumont No 14bis

General characteristics

- Crew: 1
- Wingspan: 11.5 m (37 ft 9 in)
- Wing chord: 2.5 m (8 ft 2 in)
- Height: 3.75 m (12 ft 4 in)
- Wing area: 52 m^{2} (560 sq ft)
- Gross weight: 290 kg (639 lb)
- Powerplant: 1 × Antoinette 8V Water-cooled V-8 piston engine, 37 kW (50 hp)
- Propellers: 2-bladed paddle blade pusher propeller, 2 m (6 ft 7 in) diameter

== Media ==
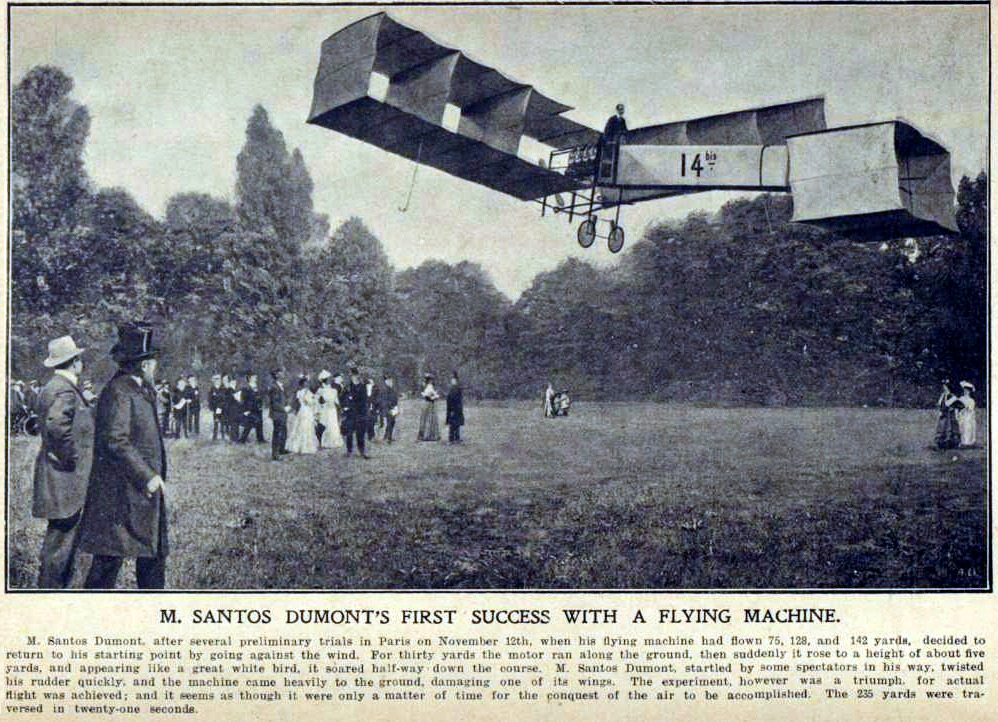
1906 newspaper illustration

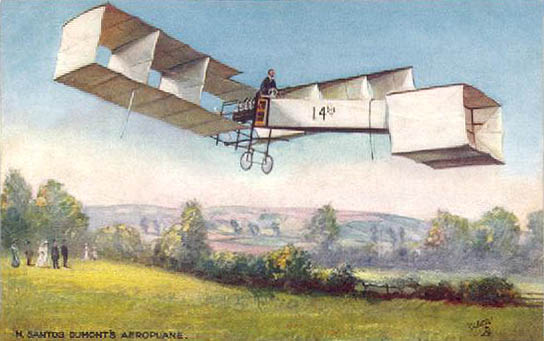
14-bis on a French postcard

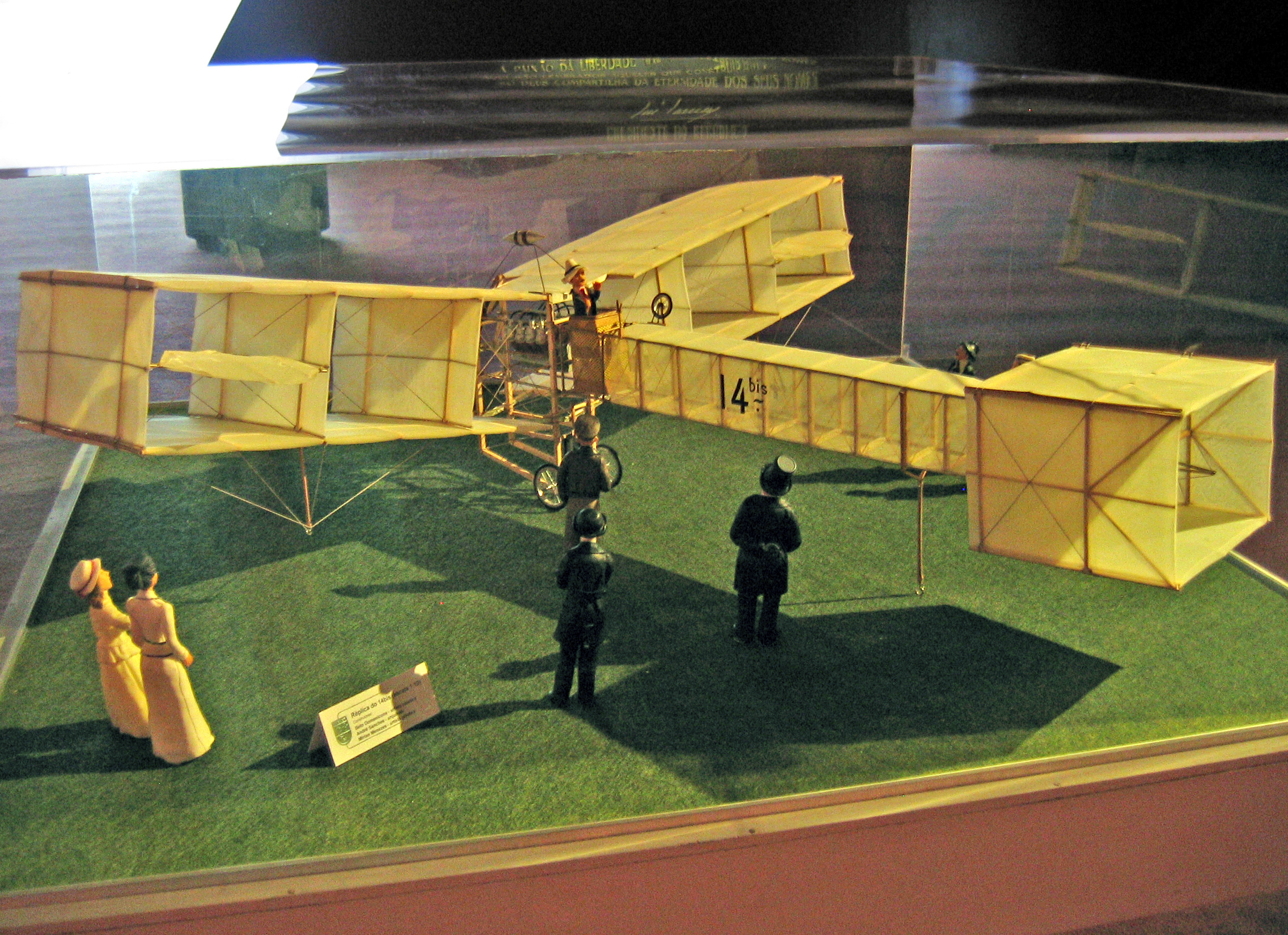
Model of 14-bis, with octagonal ailerons

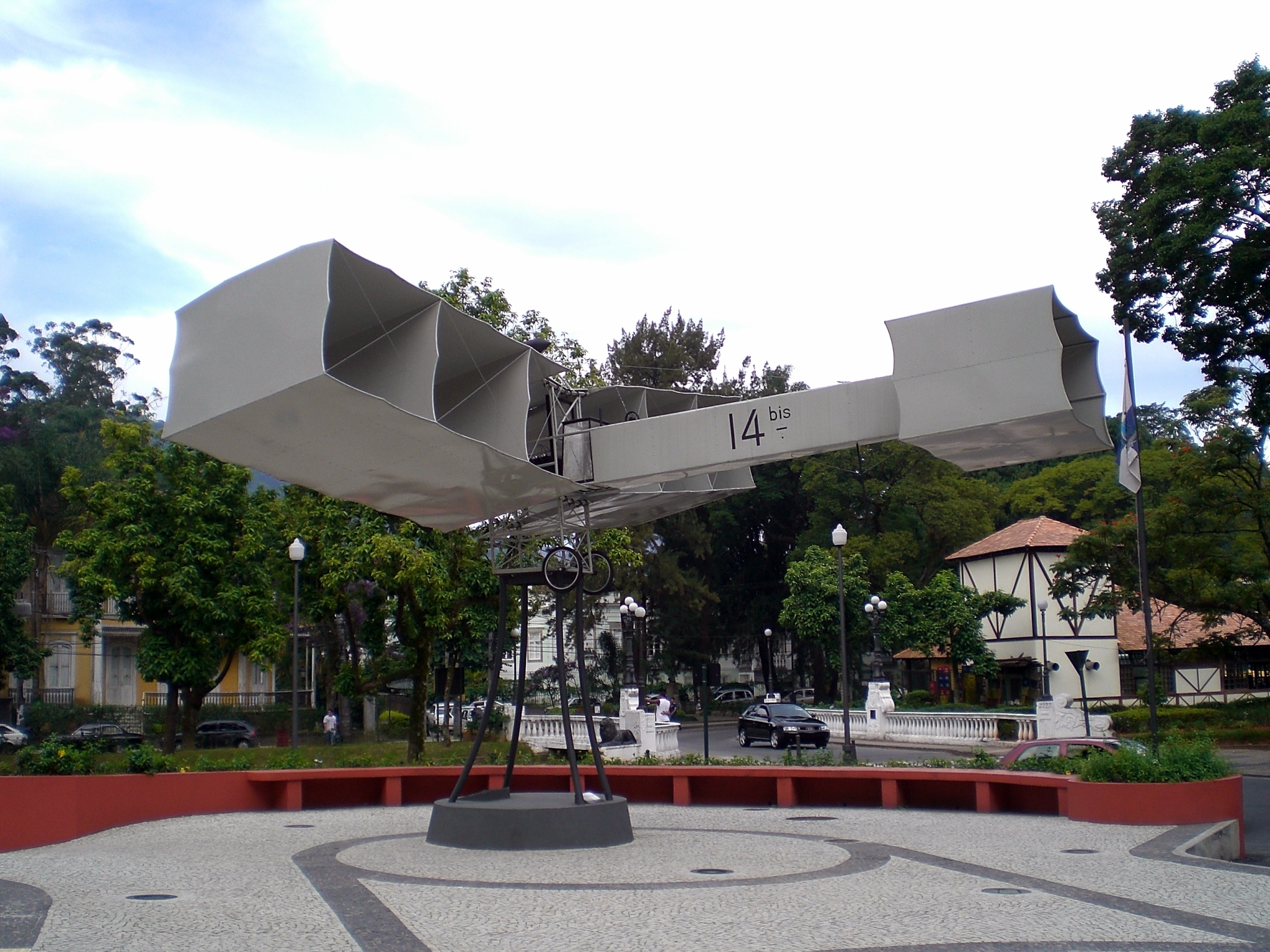
14-bis Square in Petrópolis, Rio de Janeiro, Brazil

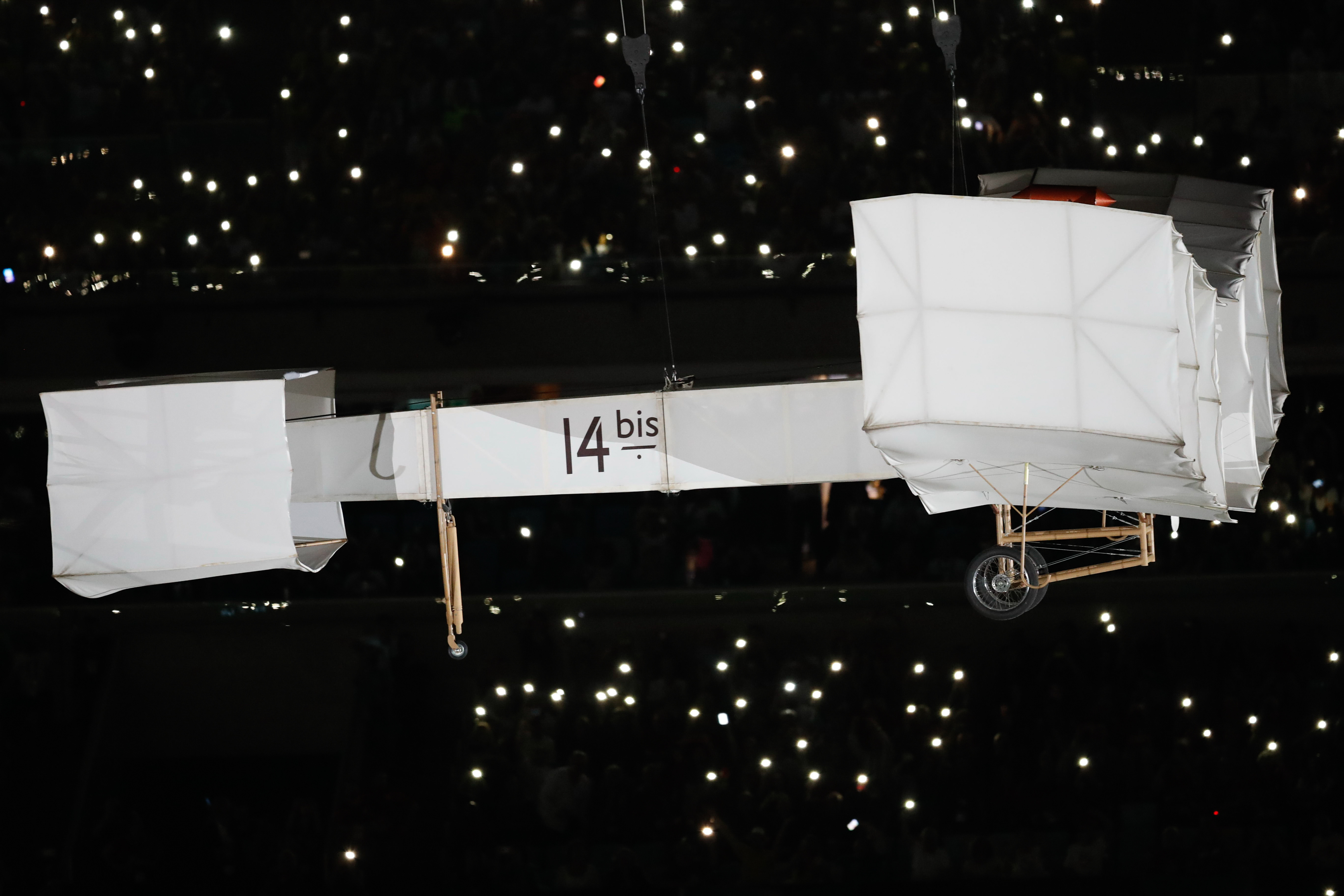
Replica 14-bis at the 2016 Summer Olympics opening ceremony

== Legacy ==
The 14-bis was featured as one of the highlights of Brazil during the 2016 Summer Olympics opening ceremony.

== Bibliography ==
- Barros, Henrique Lins de. Alberto Santos-Dumont. Associacao Promotora Da Instrucao, Rio de Janeiro: 1986.
- BARROS, Henrique Lins de (2006). Santos-Dumont and the Invention of the Airplane (PDF). Translated by Maria Cristina Ramalho Ardoy. Rio de Janeiro: CBPF. p. 17. ISBN 85-85752-17-3. Archived from the original (PDF) on April 27, 2021.
- Gray, Carroll F. (November 2006). "The 1906 Santos-Dumont No. 14bis". WWI Aero: The Journal of the Early Aeroplane (194): 4–21. ISSN 0736-198X.
- Gibbs-Smith, C. H. The Rebirth of European Aviation. London: HMSO, 1974 ISBN 0 11290180 8
- Joao Luiz Musa, Marcelo Breda Mourao, and Ricardo Tilkian, Eu Naveguei Pelo Ar ("I Flew Through the Air") 2003
- Alberto Santos Dumont A Conquista Do Ar ("The Conquest of the Air") 1901
- Hippolyto Da Costa, Fernando. Alberto Santos-Dumont: The Father of Aviation. transl: Soares, Hercillio A. VARIG Maintenance Base, Rio: 1973.
- Opdycke, Leonard E. (1999). French Aeroplanes before the Great War. Atglen: Schiffer Publishing. ISBN 0-7643-0752-5.
- Tobin, James. To Conquer the Air: The Wright Brothers and The Great Race for Flight. Free Press, New York: 2003.
- Wykeham, Peter. Santos Dumont: A Study in Obsession. London: Putnam, 1962
