= Santos-Dumont Demoiselle =

1907 early experimental aircraft series

Demoiselle
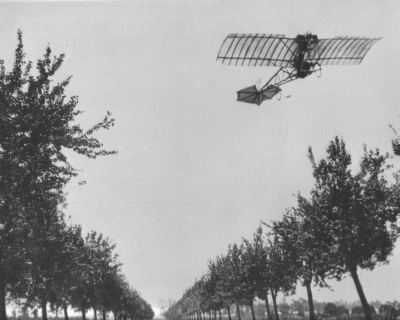
- Type 20 Demoiselle

General information
- Type: Experimental aircraft
- National origin: France
- Manufacturer: Clément-Bayard; Darracq
- Designer: Alberto Santos-Dumont

History
- First flight: 1907

The Santos-Dumont Demoiselle is a series of aircraft built in France by the Brazilian aviation pioneer Alberto Santos-Dumont. The tiny, quick, primitive airplanes -- the first successful "sport aircraft" -- were the first practical light aircraft. The Demoiselles were the most affordable airplane by 1912, and were widely copied across Europe and the United States, a principal force in the development of sport aviation.

The Demoiselles were light-weight monoplanes with a wire-braced wing mounted above an open-framework fuselage built from bamboo. The pilot's seat was below the wing and between the main wheels of the undercarriage. The rear end of the boom carried a tailwheel and a cruciform tail.

The name Demoiselle is a contraction of mademoiselle and is a synonym for "jeune fille"—young girl or woman—but also the common name in French for a Damselfly (something that the tiny plane, with its translucent, silk-covered wings, resembled).

== No. 19 ==
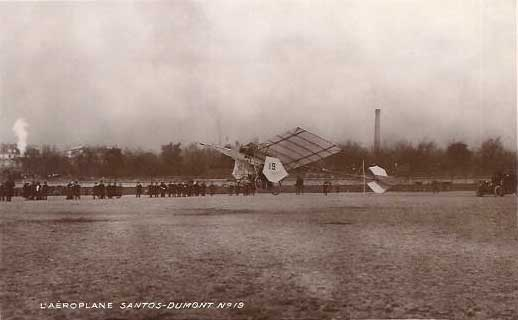
No.19 as first built

The first aircraft of the type was the Santos-Dumont No. 19, which was built in 1907 to attempt to win the Grand Prix d'Aviation offered for a one kilometre closed-circuit flight. Powered by a 15 kW (20 hp) air-cooled Dutheil & Chalmers flat-twin engine mounted on the leading edge of the wing, it had a wingspan of 5.1 m (16 ft 9 in), was 8 m (26 ft 3 in) long and weighed only 56 kg (123 lb) including fuel. It had a pair of hexagonal rudders below the wing on either side of the pilot, a forward mounted hexagonal elevator in front of the pilot and a cruciform tail which, like the boxkite-style canard surfaces on the earlier 14-bis biplane of 1906, pivoted on a universal joint to function both as elevator and rudder mounted at the end of a substantial single boom. There was no provision for lateral control. The undercarriage consisted of a pair of wheels in front of the pilot and a third behind, supplemented by a tailskid.

Santos-Dumont made three flights on 17 November 1907 at Issy-les-Moulineaux.

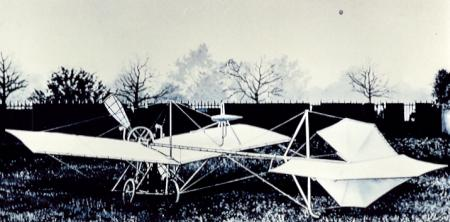
Modified Type 19

Later, Santos-Dumont made a number of modifications: he repositioned the engine, placing it below the wing in front of the pilot, fitted a different propeller and removed the forward elevator and rudders.

== No. 20 ==
Santos-Dumont's next aircraft, the Demoiselle No. 20, was first flown in 1908, with an 18 kW (24-hp) Dutheil et Chalmers later replaced by a 22 kW (30 hp) Darracq-built liquid-cooled opposed twin engine of approximately 3.2-litre displacement. The fuselage consisted of three bamboo tubes forming the primary longerons, of about 5 cm (2 in) diameter, connected by oval steel tubes. For ease of transportation the bamboo tubes were divided into two sections, joined together by brass sockets. The parallel-chord wings had two spars, made of ash, and bamboo ribs

All versions had a pair of lightweight thin-tube radiators mounted under the wing, running the entire meter chord of the wing. It used wing warping, which had been patented by the Wright Brothers in 1906, for lateral control, operated from a transverse-pivoting joystick that would fit into a long, vertical pocket added to the jacket's back that the pilot would wear to fly the aircraft, "leaning into the turn" as either a bicycle rider would do for higher-velocity turns; or as Glenn Curtiss did with the transverse "rocking-cradle armrest" apparatus on the AEA June Bug in 1908. A similar system was used by Santos-Dumont in November 1906 to likewise operate the interplane ailerons on the final version of his Quatorze-bis (14 bis) pioneering canard biplane. The initial #20 Demoiselle's wing-warping arrangement also possessed control cabling that only pulled down alternately on the outer section of the rear wing spar with no "upwards" warp capability.

The Demoiselle was the last aircraft built by Santos-Dumont. He performed flights with it in Paris, and made trips to nearby places. Flights were continued at various times through 1909, including a cross-country flight with stages of about 8 km (5 mi) from St. Cyr to Buc on 13 September 1909, returning the following day, and another on 17 September 1909 of 18 km in 16 min.

The aircraft was exhibited on the Clément-Bayard stand at the Paris Aéro Salon in October 1909 and it was announced that a production run of 100 aircraft was planned. However, only 50 were actually built, of which only 15 were sold, at a price of 7,500 francs for each airframe.. It was offered with a choice of three engines: Clément-Bayard 20 hp; Wright 4-cyl 30 hp (Clément-Bayard had the license to manufacture Wright engines); and Clément-Bayard 40 hp designed by Pierre Clerget. It achieved 120 km/h.

The French pioneer aviator Roland Garros learned to fly in a Demoiselle at a flight school established by Clement Bayard, and later flew one at Belmont Park, New York in 1910. The June 1910 edition of Popular Mechanics published drawings of the Demoiselle and wrote "This machine is better than any other which has ever been built, for those who wish to reach results with the least possible expense and with a minimum of experimenting." American companies sold drawings and parts of Demoiselle for several years thereafter.

Santos-Dumont was so enthusiastic about aviation that he released the drawings of Demoiselle for nothing, thinking that aviation would be the cause of a new prosperous era for mankind; 300 copies were built in Europe and the USA.

An example of a Demoiselle with a Darracq engine is preserved in the Musée de l'Air et de l'Espace. A flyable replica was built by Personal Plane Services Ltd for the 1965 film Those Magnificent Men in Their Flying Machines and others have been built since then. Examples are on display at the Le Bourget Paris Air and Space Museum (Musée de l’Air et de l’Espace), the Brooklands Museum in Weybridge, Surrey, England, the Old Rhinebeck Aerodrome in Red Hook, New York and others.

== Operational history ==
Though only 50 official Santos-Dumont Demoiselles were built (and only 15 sold), the Demoiselles were the most affordable airplane by 1912, and Santos-Dumont made the plans freely available to the public, without compensation. Countless copies were made, throughout Europe and the United States, a major force stimulating the development of aviation as a sport.

Widely flown, as were the many copies of them, the Demoiselles were used to achieve many early airplane firsts and records. In France, in 1907, Santos-Dumont made the first airplane flight between two cities (from Saint-Cyr to Buc), setting a record speed of 95 kilometres per hour (59 mph). On September 14, 1909, Santos-Dumont set a recognized speed record of 55 miles per hour (89 km/h), to win a $200 prize.

Although pilots reported they were challenging to fly, no Demoiselle pilots died in an accident (a rare achievement among common aircraft in early aviation), and the Demoiselles set many early airplane records and firsts.

== Specifications (No. 20) ==
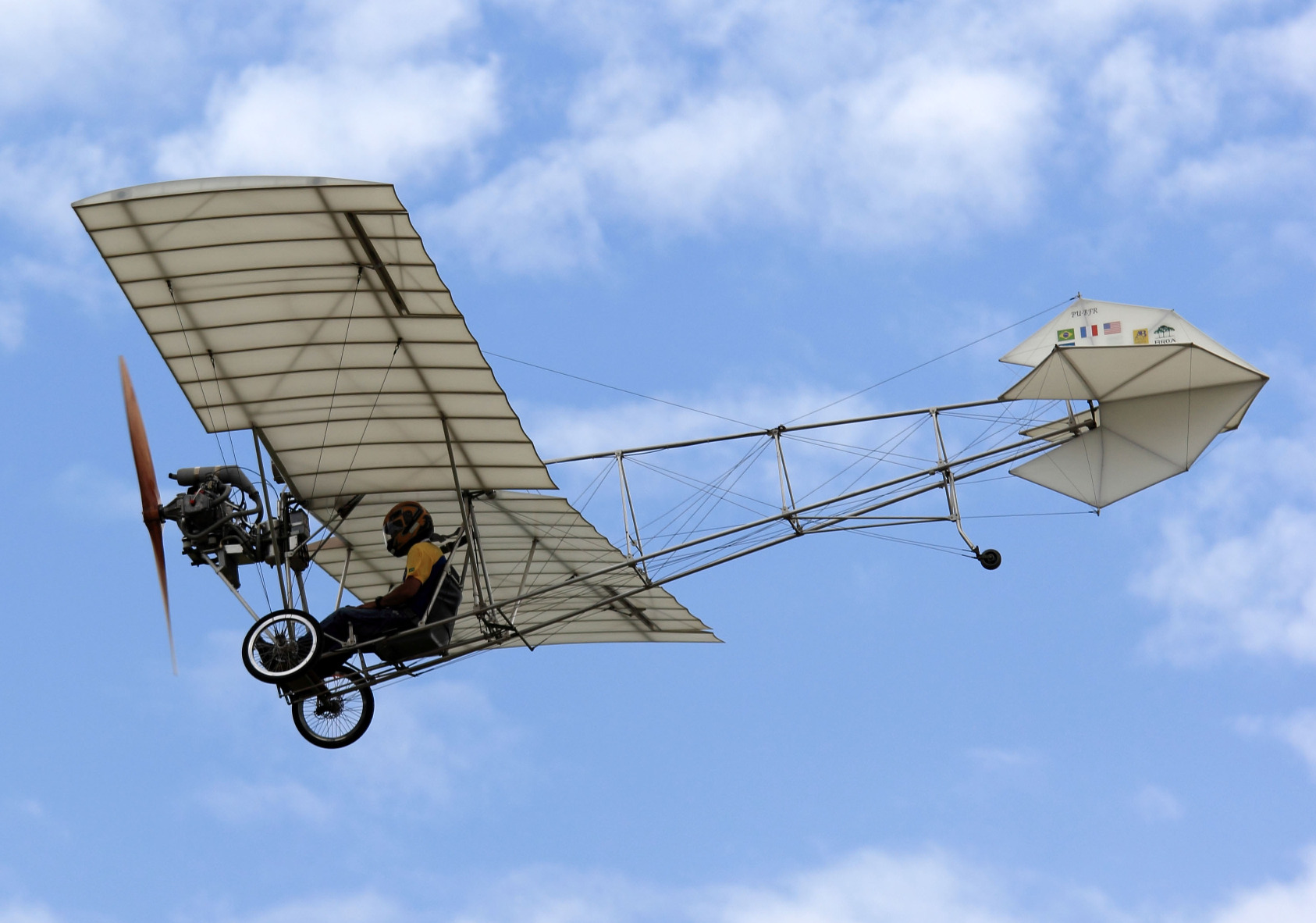
Santos-Dumont Demoiselle replica in flight

Data from Flight, 2 October 1909, p. 604

General characteristics

- Crew: One
- Length: 6.07 m (20 ft 3 in)
- Wingspan: 5.49 m (18 ft 0 in)
- Height: 2.40 m (7 ft 10 in)
- Wing area: 10.68 m^{2} (115 sq ft)
- Empty weight: 110 kg (242 lb)
- Powerplant: 1 × Darracq , 22 kW (30 hp) 3.2 litre (195 cu.in.)

Performance

- Maximum speed: 90 km/h (60 mph, 52 kn)

== See also ==
- I.S.T. XL-15 Tagak
