= Yolanda Penteado =

Brazilian socialite

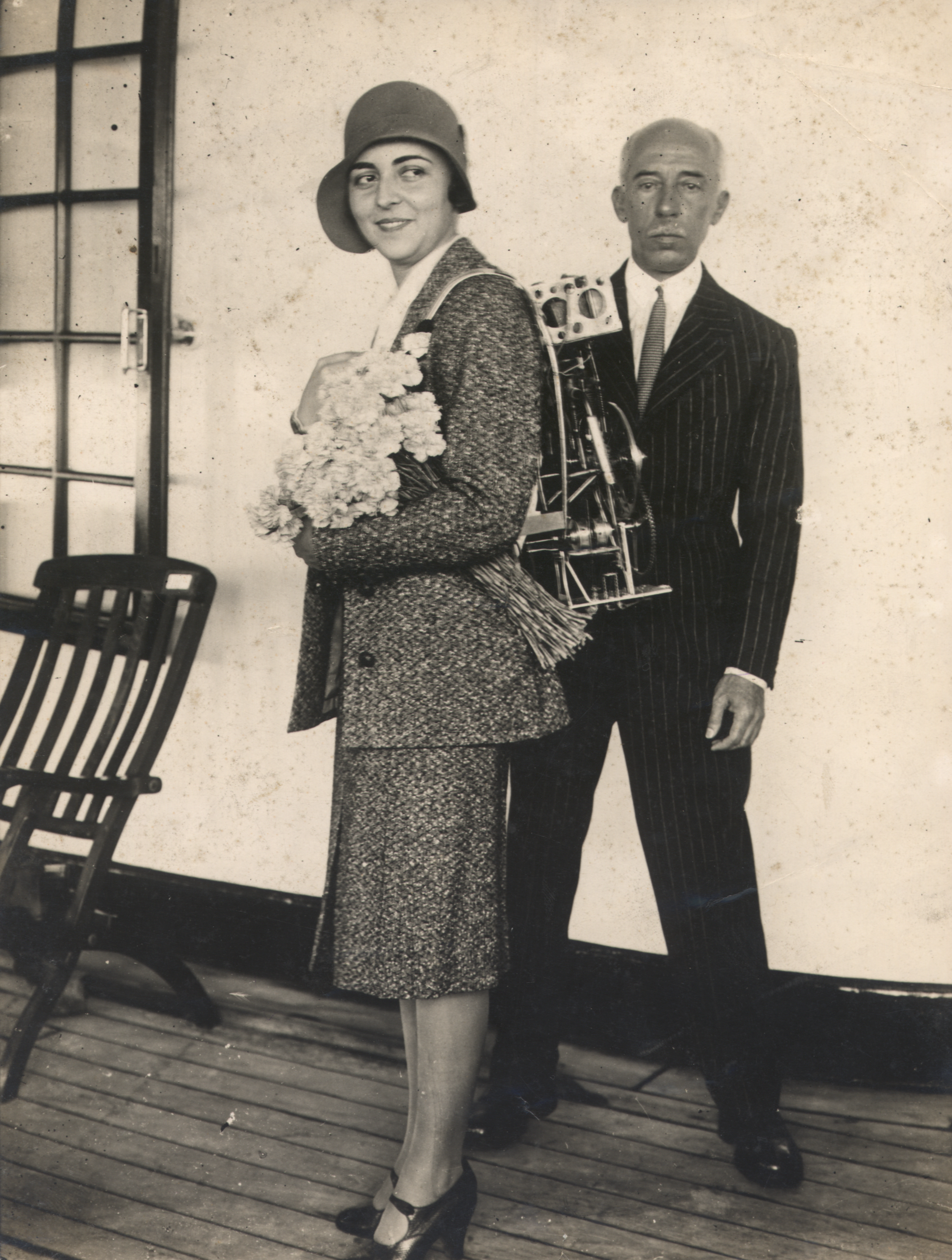
A picture of Yolanda de Ataliba Nogueira Penteado

Yolanda de Ataliba Nogueira Penteado (1903-1983) was a Brazilian patron of the arts and member of an affluent coffee ranching family with artistic connections. Her aunt was Olívia Guedes Penteado and she was married to Ciccillo Matarazzo.
