= Timbalier =

Timbalier may refer to:

Places

- Timbalier Bay, a bay in Lafourche Parish on the southeast coast of Louisiana in the United States
- Timbalier Island, an island in Lafourche Parish off the southeast coast of Louisiana in the United States

Ships

- USS Timbalier (AVP-54), a United States Navy seaplane tender in commission from 1946 to 1954
