= List of shipwrecks in June 1877 =

The list of shipwrecks in June 1877 includes ships sunk, foundered, grounded, or otherwise lost during June 1877.

== 1 June ==
List of shipwrecks: 1 June 1877
Ship	State	Description
Aurora	United Kingdom	The schooner ran aground on the Abertay Sands, at the mouth of the River Tay and was severely damaged. She was on a voyage from Christiania, Norway to Dundee, Forfarshire. She was refloated on 17 July and taken in to Dundee.
Freja	United Kingdom	The ship was wrecked on Belle Île, Morbihan, France. Her crew were rescued by the steamship Valparaiso (United Kingdom).
Lord Rollo	United Kingdom	The schooner ran aground on the Horseshoe Sandbank, in the Solent. She was on a voyage from London to Bideford, Devon. She was refloated but was driven ashore at Southsea, Hampshire. Her crew survived.

== 2 June ==
List of shipwrecks: 2 June 1877
Ship	State	Description
Agatha Catharina	Netherlands	The ship was driven ashore at Shoreham-by-Sea, Sussex, United Kingdom. She was on a voyage from Bilbao, Spain to Dordrecht, South Holland.
Beagle	United Kingdom	The yacht was run into by Nyanza (United Kingdom) and sank at Greenock, Renfrewshire.
Canova	Italy	The ship was driven ashore in the Kerkennah Islands, Beylik of Tunis. She was on a voyage from La Spezia to Gabès, Beylik of Tunis.
Clotilda	France	The ship sank in the Bristol Channel off Penarth, Glamorgan, United Kingdom. She was on a voyage from Cardiff, Glamorgan to Redon, Ille-et-Vilaine.
Mary	United Kingdom	The steamship ran aground in the River Tay. She was on a voyage from Dundee, Forfarshire to the River Tyne. She was refloated with the assistance of a tug and resumed her voyage.
Sarah	United Kingdom	The ship was driven ashore and wrecked at Lulworth, Dorset. She was on a voyage from Sunderland, County Durham to Weymouth, Dorset.

== 4 June ==
List of shipwrecks: 4 June 1877
Ship	State	Description
Foam	United Kingdom	The schooner was driven ashore at Ramsey, Isle of Man. Her crew were rescued. She was on a voyage from Ardrossan, Ayrshire to Runcorn, Cheshire.
Mincio	Italy	The barque ran aground in the Bosphorus. She was on a voyage from Constanţa to Constantinople, Ottoman Empire.
Rollo	United Kingdom	The barque ran aground on the Leixas Reef, 2 1/2 nautical miles (4.6 km) off Vila do Conde, Portugal and sank. She was on a voyage from Malta to Woolwich, Kent.
Sprightly	United Kingdom	The smack was driven ashore at Appledore, Devon. She was on a voyage from Newport, Monmouthshire to "Port Gaikroa".
Svalenanhem	Norway	The barque was driven ashore and wrecked on South Ronaldsay, Orkney Islands, United Kingdom. She was on a voyage from Christiania to Ayr, United Kingdom.

== 5 June ==
List of shipwrecks: 5 June 1877
Ship	State	Description
British India	United Kingdom	The full-rigged ship ran aground on the Cockle Rock, off the coast of County Galway. She was on a voyage from Huanillos, Peru to Galway. She was refloated.
Ellen	United Kingdom	The sloop was destroyed by fire in Llandudno Bay.
Esther	United Kingdom	The sloop foundered in the Irish Sea off the Great Orme Head, Caernarfonshire. Both crew were rescued by the pilot boat Perseverance (United Kingdom).
Saxon	United Kingdom	The cutter ran aground on the Longsand, in the North Sea off the coast of Essex. She was refloated with assistance and taken in to Harwich, Essex.

== 6 June ==
List of shipwrecks: 6 June 1877
Ship	State	Description
Grietje	Netherlands	The galiot ran aground and sank off Hiiumaa, Russia. Her crew were rescued. She was on a voyage from Newcastle upon Tyne, Northumberland, United Kingdom to Saint Petersburg, Russia.

== 7 June ==
List of shipwrecks: 7 June 1877
Ship	State	Description
Pauline	France	The sloop foundered off Alderney, Channel Islands. Her three crew were rescued by Nunquam Dormio (Flag unknown).
Tom Morton	United Kingdom	The steamship ran aground in the River Avon underneath the Clifton Suspension Bridge. She was on a voyage from Nicholaieff, Russia to Bristol, Gloucestershire. She was refloated.

== 9 June ==
List of shipwrecks: 9 June 1877
Ship	State	Description
Constantine	Imperial Russian Navy	Russo-Turkish War: The auxiliary cruiser ran aground at Sulina, Ottoman Empire whilst going to the assistance of a boat from the torpedo boat Tschesme (Imperial Russian Navy), which had been severely damaged in an attack on an Ottoman Navy monitor. She was refloated but the boat was captured by the Ottomans.

== 10 June ==
List of shipwrecks: 10 June 1877
Ship	State	Description
Canopus	United Kingdom	The ship was wrecked at "Mayolta", Aden Colony. Her crew were rescued.
Henry	United Kingdom	The ship was wrecked at Santo Domingo Tonalá, Mexico, Her crew were rescued.
Malvina	United Kingdom	The steamship put in to South Shields, County Durham on fire. The fire was extinguished. She was on a voyage from Leith, Lothian to London.

== 11 June ==
List of shipwrecks: 11 June 1877
Ship	State	Description
Mina	United Kingdom	The ship ran aground in the River Tay. She was on a voyage from Quebec City, Canada to Montrose, Forfarshire. She was refloated.
Pansy	United Kingdom	The ship ran aground at Sandhamn, Sweden. She was on a voyage from Sunderland, County Durham to Stockholm, Sweden. She was refloated and taken in to Stockholm in a leaky condition.
Rowena	United Kingdom	The barque was wrecked in the Magdalen Islands, Nova Scotia, Canada.

== 12 June ==
List of shipwrecks: 12 June 1877
Ship	State	Description
Baroda	Queensland	The barque was wrecked on the Chesterfield Reef. Her crew were rescued.
Paragon	United Kingdom	The brigantine sprang a leak and sank in Angle Bay. She was on a voyage from Neath, Glamorgan to Dublin.fer
Unnamed	Flag unknown	The ship was driven ashore on Sanda Island, Argyllshire, United Kingdom.

== 13 June ==
List of shipwrecks: 13 June 1877
Ship	State	Description
Duchess of Sutherland	United Kingdom	The steamship ran aground at Holyhead, Anglesey. She was on a voyage from Greenore, County Wexford to Holyhead. She was refloated.
Glengarry	United Kingdom	The steamship was driven ashore 1 nautical mile (1.9 km) north of the Heugh Lighthouse, County Durham. She was on a voyage from Grangemouth, Stirlingshire to Middlesbrough, Yorkshire. She was refloated with the assistance of two tugs.
Redesdale	United Kingdom	The steamship ran aground at Saltholmen, Denmark. She was on a voyage from Kronstadt, Russia to London. She was refloated and resumed her voyage.

== 14 June ==
List of shipwrecks: 14 June 1877
Ship	State	Description
Annie	United Kingdom	The fishing smack was run down and sunk 5 nautical miles (9.3 km) east of the Coquet Island, Northumberland by Marie Stuart (United Kingdom). Her crew were rescued.
Cinar	Norway	The brig ran aground on the Haisborough Sands, in the North Sea off the coast of Norfolk, United Kingdom. Her crew were rescued.
Dawn	New Zealand	The 21-ton cutter stranded close to the mouth of the Waikato River, and became a complete wreck.

== 15 June ==
List of shipwrecks: 15 June 1877
Ship	State	Description
J. C. Domgart	Germany	The schooner capsized and sank at Hela.

== 16 June ==
List of shipwrecks: 16 June 1877
Ship	State	Description
Forward	United Kingdom	The smack struck a sunken rock and sank at Ardrishaig, Argyllshire.
Juan Fernandez	Norway	The ship struck a rock and foundered off Rosyth Castle, Fife, United Kingdom with the loss of all hands, according to a message in a bottle which washed ashore at Terschelling, Friesland, Netherlands in late October.

== 17 June ==
List of shipwrecks: 17 June 1877
Ship	State	Description
Lodka	Russia	The ship sprang a leak and sank at Kronstadt.
Meikong	France	The steamship was wrecked at Ras Hafun, Majerteen Sultanate with the loss of four lives. Survivors were rescued by the steamship Glenartney (United Kingdom). Meikong was on a voyage from Shanghai, China to Marseille, Bouches-du-Rhône. The wreck was plundered by the local inhabitants. She subsequently broke in two and the wreck was pillaged.

== 18 June ==
List of shipwrecks: 18 June 1877
Ship	State	Description
Calypso	France	The brig ran aground and was wrecked at Lagos, Lagos Colony.
Three or four unnamed vessels	Ottoman Empire	Russo-Turkish War: The schooners were captured and sunk in the Black Sea by Veliky Knyaz Konstantin (Imperial Russian Navy). Their crews were rescued and put ashore.

== 19 June ==
List of shipwrecks: 19 June 1877
Ship	State	Description
Albatross	United Kingdom	The steam yacht was driven ashore at South Nipe Point, Yorkshire. She was on a voyage from Bridlington, Yorkshire to Scarborough, Yorkshire. She was refloated with assistance from the steam yacht Erik (United Kingdom) and taken in to Scarborough.
J. P. Taylor	United Kingdom	The steamship ran aground south of Sunderland, County Durham. She was on a voyage from Brake, Germany to South Shields, County Durham. She was refloated and resumed her voyage.
Morna	United Kingdom	The ship capsized at Liverpool, Lancashire.
Strang	Norway	The barque was driven ashore on "the Estonian coast". Eight of her eleven crew were taken off by a lifeboat.

== 20 June ==
List of shipwrecks: 20 June 1877
Ship	State	Description
Colstrup	United Kingdom	The steamship was driven ashore at Sully Island, Glamorgan. She was on a voyage from Bilbao, Spain to Cardiff, Glamorgan.
Edith Havilland	New South Wales	The brig ran aground and sank at Carpenter Rocks, South Australia with the loss of at 27 of the 35 people on board. She was on a voyage from Sydney to Adelaide, South Australia.
Mathilde et Elizabeth	France	The brig collided with the steamship Triton (United Kingdom) and sank in the North Sea. Her crew were rescued by Triton.
Four unnamed vessels	Ottoman Empire	Russo-Turkish War: The ships were abandoned off Cape Kerempe and were sunk by "Constantine" (Imperial Russian Navy) .

== 21 June ==
List of shipwrecks: 21 June 1877
Ship	State	Description
Phaeton	United Kingdom	The ship was driven ashore and wrecked at Tellicherry, India.

== 22 June ==
List of shipwrecks: 22 June 1877
Ship	State	Description
Elysia	United Kingdom	The steamship was driven ashore at Dungeness, Kent. She was refloated and resumed her voyage.
Lowestoft	United Kingdom	The schooner was wrecked 2 nautical miles (3.7 km) from Lossiemouth, Moray with the loss of all five crew.
Unnamed	Flag unknown	The steamship ran aground on the Carreg Cocks Reef, off Anglesey, United Kingdom.

== 24 June ==
List of shipwrecks: 24 June 1877
Ship	State	Description
J. T. E. Ettringham	United Kingdom	The tug struck rocks and sank off Broughty Ferry, Forfarshire. She was refloated on 29 June and taken in to Dundee, Forfarshire for repairs.

== 25 June ==
List of shipwrecks: 25 June 1877
Ship	State	Description
Amulet	United Kingdom	The steamship arrived at Leith, Lothian on fire. She was on a voyage from Antwerp, Belgium to Leith.
Ann and Joseph	United Kingdom	The schooner was driven ashore at Caernarfon.
Ark	United Kingdom	The brig was driven ashore and wrecked at "Saggad Vasparvicu", Russia. Her crew were rescued.
Excelsior	United Kingdom	The barque ran aground between "Chambretta" and Pointe de Grave, Gironde, France. She was on a voyage from Bordeaux, Gironde to Cardiff, Glamorgan.
Nella	Netherlands	The brig ran aground off "Kellboda", Grand Duchy of Finland and was wrecked. She was on a voyage from Borgå, Grand Duchy of Finland to Middelburg, Zeeland.

== 26 June ==
List of shipwrecks: 26 June 1877
Ship	State	Description
J. B. Walker	United States	The ship was driven ashore at New York. She was on a voyage from New York to Newhaven, Connecticut and Malta. She was refloated.

== 27 June ==
List of shipwrecks: 27 June 1877
Ship	State	Description
Cardiganshire	United Kingdom	The barque ran aground at Goole, Yorkshire. She was on a voyage from a port in Central America to Goole.
Clarovine	United Kingdom	The barque was driven ashore at the Heads of Ayr, Ayrshire. She was on a voyage from Troon, Ayrshire to Venice, Italy.
Frithjof	Norway	The steamship ran aground at Dunkirk, Nord, France. She was on a voyage from "Vignoes" to Dunkirk.
Harmony	United Kingdom	The barque ran aground at IJmuiden, North Holland, Netherlands. She was on a voyage from Saint John, New Brunswick, Canada to Amsterdam, North Holland. She was refloated with the assistance of five tugs and found to be severely leaky.
Regina del Cin	Austria-Hungary	The barque ran aground at Great Yarmouth, Norfolk, United Kingdom. She was refloated.

== 28 June ==
List of shipwrecks: 28 June 1877
Ship	State	Description
Lily	United Kingdom	The steamship was run into by the steamship Prometheus (United Kingdom) and sank off Souter Point, Northumberland. Her crew were rescued. Lily was on a voyage from South Shields to Seaham, County Durham.
Unnamed	Russia	Russo-Turkish War: The steamship was shelled and sunk in the Danube upstream of Rahova, United Principalities by the monitor Podgoriçe (Ottoman Navy).

== 29 June ==
List of shipwrecks: 29 June 1877
Ship	State	Description
Antias	United Kingdom	The schooner was driven ashore at Boulmer, Northumberland. She was refloated the next day with the assistance of a tug.
Clio	Germany	The barque was abandoned in the Atlantic Ocean. Her crew were rescued by Athlete ( (Canada) ). Clio was on a voyage from Doboy, Georgia, United States to Fleetwood, Lancashire, United Kingdom.
Florence Braginton	United Kingdom	The barque departed from Callao, Peru for an English port. No further trace, presumed foundered with the loss of all hands.
Greta	United Kingdom	The steamship ran aground at Ardrossan, Ayrshire. She was refloated.
Johanna Meelna	Sweden	The ship foundered north of Öland. She was on a voyage from Västervik to Danzig, Germany.
Lady Clare	United Kingdom	The steamship was driven ashore at Kastrup, Denmark. She was refloated.
Nightingale	United States	The ship was driven ashore at Point Areybar, New York.
Sirius	Netherlands	The steamship ran aground on the Haaks Bank, off the Dutch coast. She was on a voyage from Kronstadt, Russia to Amsterdam, North Holland. She was refloated and taken in to the Nieuwe Diep.
Solvang	Norway	The schooner was driven ashore at "Segeastad", Öland. She was on a voyage from Riga, Russia to Copenhagen, Denmark. She was refloated with assistance.

== 30 June ==
List of shipwrecks: 30 June 1877
Ship	State	Description
Denderah	Germany	The steamship sank in the Sarmiento Channel. All on board were rescued. She was on a voyage from Callao, Peru to Hamburg.
Deodata	Netherlands	The barque was driven ashore at Dragør, Denmark. She was refloated.
Magnet	United Kingdom	The ship was damaged by fire at Pärnu, Russia.
Sirene	Belgium	The lighter sank at Antwerp.

== Unknown date ==
List of shipwrecks: Unknown date in June 1877
Ship	State	Description
Adventure	France	The brig was wrecked at Saint-Pierre, Saint Pierre and Miquelon. Her crew were rescued.
Agathe	Flag unknown	The ship was wrecked by a tornado at Santo Domingo Tonalá, Mexico before 20 June.
Bradsborg	Flag unknown	The ship was wrecked by a tornado at Santo Domingo Tonalá before 20 June.
Canadian	United Kingdom	The steamship caught fire at Gallipoli, Ottoman Empire.
Canova	United Kingdom	The ship was driven ashore on Kirkein Island, Beylik of Tunis. She was on a voyage from La Spezia, Italy to Gabès, Beylik of Tunis.
Catharina	Flag unknown	The ship was wrecked by a tornado at Santo Domingo Tonalá before 20 June.
Centennial	United States	The ship was wrecked in the Gulf of Saint Lawrence with the loss of two of her crew.
Ceres	Denmark	The brig foundered in the North Sea. Her crew were rescued.
City of Venice	United Kingdom	The ship ran aground on the North Rock, in the Belfast Lough. She was refloated on 27 June.
Daniel Marcy	United States	The ship was wrecked on the Alceste Reef, in the Gaspar Strait. Her crew were rescued. She was on a voyage from Manila, Spanish East Indies to New York.
Dante	New Zealand	The 16-ton cutter left Manukau Harbour, New Zealand on 11 June for Waitara, and was not seen again. She had a crew of three.
Emily Smith	Flag unknown	The brig was wrecked on Kangaroo Island, South Australia with the loss of nineteen of the 22 people on board.
Emperor	United Kingdom	The ship was wrecked on Acklins Island, Bahamas. She was on a voyage from the West Indies to Havre de Grâce, Seine-Inférieure, France.
Erwartung	Germany	The ship ran aground at Gotland, Sweden before 13 June. She was on a voyage from Riga, Russia to Leith, Lothian, United Kingdom. She was refloated and put in to Swinemünde in a leaky condition.
Fatula	Flag unknown	The ship was wrecked by a tornado at Tupilco, Mexico before 20 June.
Henrich	Flag unknown	The ship was wrecked by a tornado at Santo Domingo Tonalá before 20 June.
Honduras	Flag unknown	The ship was wrecked by a tornado at Santo Domingo Tonalá before 20 June.
Imprevue	France	The ship was wrecked on Acklins Island, Bahamas before 4 June. Her crew were rescued.
Isurium	United Kingdom	The ship ran aground at Cuttack, India and broke her back.
Java	United States	The 309-ton whaling barque was lost in the Bering Sea.
Juan F. Pearson	United Kingdom	The ship was driven ashore and wrecked at L'Étang-du-Nord, Magdalen Islands, Nova Scotia, Canada between 26 and 30 June with the loss of all hands. She was on a voyage from Saint John's, Newfoundland Colony to Amsterdam, North Holland, Netherlands.
Kaikoura	New Zealand	The 31-ton schooner left its namesake port in New Zealand on 5 June for Greymouth, and was not seen again. She had a crew of three. Some wreckage washed ashore near Charleston, north of Greymouth, was identified as being from the Kaikoura.
Kalstad	United Kingdom	The ship was driven ashore on Goose Island. She was on a voyage from Quebec City, Canada to Waterford. She was refloated and put back to Quebec City in a leaky condition.
Kate Agnes	United Kingdom	The ship was driven ashore near Barrington. She was on a voyage from Saint John's to Newport, Monmouthshire. She was consequently condemned.
Kildare	United Kingdom	The ship was driven ashore and damaged at Quebec City. She was on a voyage from Quebec City to Belfast, County Antrim. She was refloated on 18 June.
Koh-i-Noor	United Kingdom	The ship was driven ashore and wrecked at L'Étang du Nord between 26 and 30 June with the loss of all hands.
Leith	Flag unknown	The ship was wrecked at Tupilco before 20 June.
Maria	Portugal	The schooner foundered at sea. Her crew were rescued. She was on a voyage from Lisbon to Boulogne, Pas-de-Calais, France.
Miranda	United Kingdom	The brig was wrecked at Folly Point, Jamaica. Her crew were rescued. She was on a voyage from Kingston to Annotto Bay, Jamaica.
Nordkap	Flag unknown	The ship was wrecked by a tornado at Santo Domingo Tonalá before 20 June.
Pomona		The barque was wrecked in the Gulf of Saint Lawrence. Her crew were rescued.
Primus	United Kingdom	The steamship was driven ashore on Gotland, Sweden. She was on a voyage from Kronstadt, Russia to an English port. She was refloated and put in to Copenhagen, Denmark on 14 June in a leaky condition. Subsequently repaired.
Result	(United Kingdom of Great Britain and Ireland) Guernsey	The barque was driven ashore in the Salt River, Jamaica. She was on a voyage from Guernsey to the Salt River. She was refloated on 28 June.
Rowena	United Kingdom	The barque was wrecked on a reef off South West Point, Magdalen Islands between 26 and 29 June. Her crew were rescued the next day by the schooner Typhoon (Flag unknown).
Salier	Germany	The steamship ran aground on the Chico Bank, in the River Plate. She was on a voyage from Hamburg to Buenos Aires, Argentina. She was refloated on 1 July and taken in to Buenos Aires.
Stanley Heath	United Kingdom	The ship was wrecked by a tornado at Tupilco before 20 June.
St. Agnes Filichi	Italy	The ship foundered off "Cape Sicie" before 2 June with the loss of a crew member. Survivors were rescued by Comte Bacchiochio (France). St. Agnes Filichi was on a voyage from Ajaccio, Sicily to Marseille, Bouches-du-Rhône, France.
Stanley Castle	United Kingdom	The barque was wrecked on the Sacramento Shoal, in the Indian Ocean. Her crew were rescued.
St. Clair	United Kingdom	The steamship struck a sunken rock in Loch Brackadale and was wrecked.
Sultan of Sockotoo	United Kingdom	The paddle steamer was wrecked in the Niger River.
Typhoon	Flag unknown	The schooner was wrecked on a reef off Entry Island, Magdalen Islands between 27 and 30 June. All on board survived.
Winchester	United Kingdom	The ship foundered. Her crew were rescued by Privateer (United Kingdom). Winchester was on a voyage from Adelaide, South Australia to Galle, Ceylon.
192	Russia	The lighter was run into by the steamship Bewick (United Kingdom) and sank at Kronstadt.
Four unnamed vessels	Flags unknown	The ships were wrecked by a tornado at Santa Anna, Mexico before 20 June.
Unnamed	Ottoman Empire	The ship was sunk by a spar torpedo at Therapia in an experiment by the Ottoman Navy in late June.
Eighteen unnamed vessels	Flags unknown	The ships were driven ashore at L'Étang du Nord between 26 and 30 June.
