= Fabre Hydravion =

Aircraft by Henri Fabre; first to take off from water under its own power (1910)

- The Hydravion during tests in 1911

General information
- Type: Experimental floatplane/Pioneer aircraft
- Manufacturer: Henri Fabre
- Owners: Henri Fabre

History
- First flight: 28 March 1910
- Fate: Crashed on 12 April 1911

Fabre Hydravion is the name used in English-language sources for an originally unnamed experimental floatplane designed by Henri Fabre. The aircraft is notable as the first to take off from water under its own power.

== Development ==
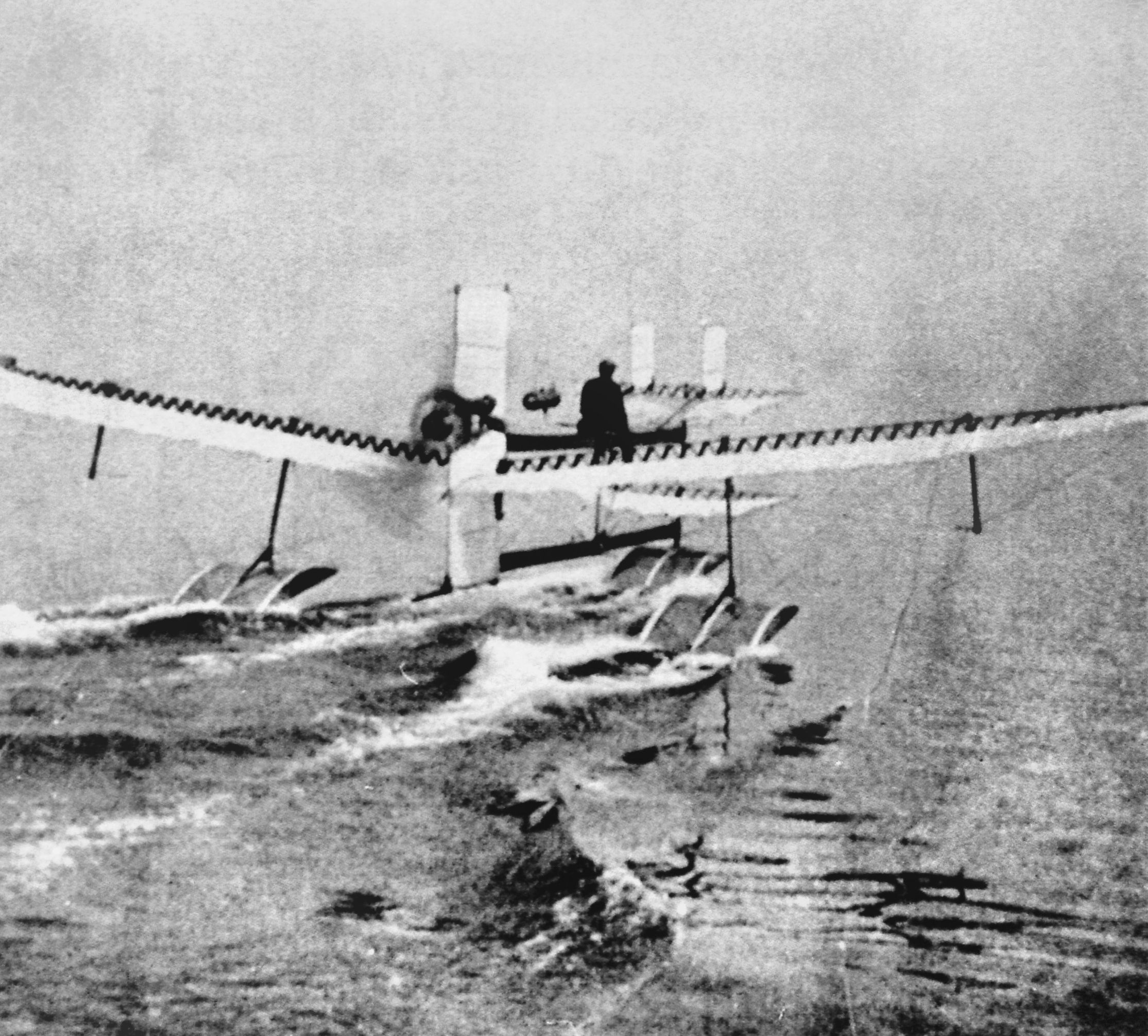
Henri Fabre at the controls of his machine. Three floats, connected to the aircraft by thin struts, trail white wake in the water.

Hydravion (French for seaplane/floatplane) was developed over a period of four years by Fabre, assisted by a former mechanic of Captain Ferdinand Ferber, named Marius Burdin, and Léon Sebille, a naval architect from Marseille. Fabre did not initially name his machine, which in contemporary reports was referred to as an "aéroplane marin", but it subsequently came to be referred to in English common usage by the French term for the type of craft.

The aircraft was a canard configuration monoplane whose structure made extensive use of a beam design working as a spanwise spar on its wing panels and forward canard surface, patented by Fabre. This was a Warren truss girder with all members having a streamlined section. Two of these beams, one above the other and connected by three substantial struts, formed the fuselage of the aircraft. The wing, which had pronounced dihedral and whose leading edge was formed by an exposed Fabre beam, was mounted below the rear of the upper beam, and the Gnome Omega rotary engine driving a two-bladed pusher Chauvière propeller was mounted behind it. Additional bracing for the wings was provided by kingposts extending down from the leading edge at mid-span. There were two small foreplanes, which, like the wing, had exposed Fabre beams forming their leading edges, one mounted above the upper beam and the second on the strut connecting the two beams. A rectangular rear-mounted rudder was situated above the wing: below the wing there was a similar rectangular fixed surface extending down to the lower fuselage beam. The pilot sat astride the upper fuselage beam. The aircraft was equipped with three broad floats: one at the front of the aircraft, the other two mounted on struts extending down from the wing.

It successfully took off and flew for a distance of about 500 metres (1,600 ft) on 28 March 1910 at Étang de Berre, Martigues, Bouches-du-Rhône, France, being the first seaplane in history. Fabre had no prior flying experience. He flew the floatplane successfully three more times that day and within a week he had flown a distance of 5.6 km (3.5 mi). The aircraft then became badly damaged in an accident.

These experiments were closely followed by aviation pioneers Gabriel and Charles Voisin. Eager to construct a seaplane, Voisin purchased several of the Fabre floats and fitted them to their Voisin Canard.

Hydravion was flown by Jean Bécue at the Concours de Canots Automobiles de Monaco, and crashed there on 12 April 1911, being damaged beyond repair. No more Hydravions were built.

Following this experience, Henri Fabre built floats for other aviation pioneers, including (as well as Voisin) Caudron, who built the Hydroaéroplane Caudron-Fabre.

== Surviving examples ==
The restored example of the aircraft remains - the crashed Hydravion which was collected in 1922 and later restored and displayed by the Musée de l'air et de l'espace (French Air and Space Museum) at Le Bourget (Seine-Saint-Denis), and a replica, close to the location of the initial flight, at Marseille Provence Airport in Marignane (Bouches-du-Rhône).Pegase n°17. March 1980.

== Specifications (October 1910) ==
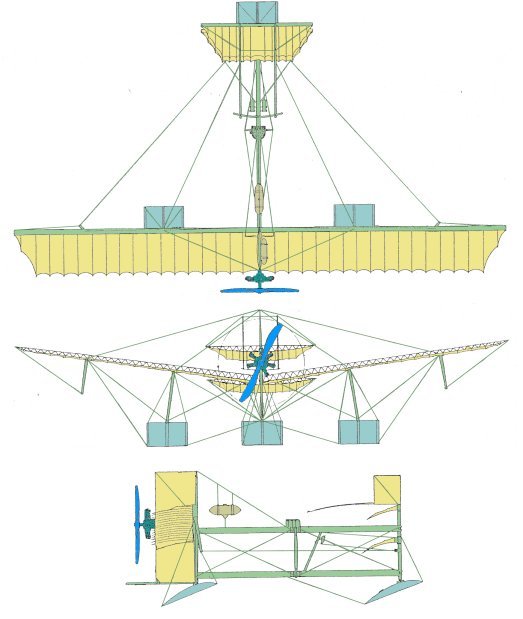

Data from Flying boats and Seaplanes

General characteristics

- Crew: one
- Length: 8.5 m (27 ft 10 in)
- Wingspan: 14 m (45 ft 11 in)
- Height: 3.70 m (12 ft 2 in)
- Wing area: 17 m^{2} (183 sq ft)
- Empty weight: 380 kg (838 lb)
- Gross weight: 475 kg (1,047 lb)
- Powerplant: 1 × Gnome Omega rotary 7-cylinder piston engine , 37 kW (50 hp)

Performance

- Maximum speed: 89 km/h (55 mph, 48 kn)
