= French seaplane carrier Foudre =

French seaplane carrier

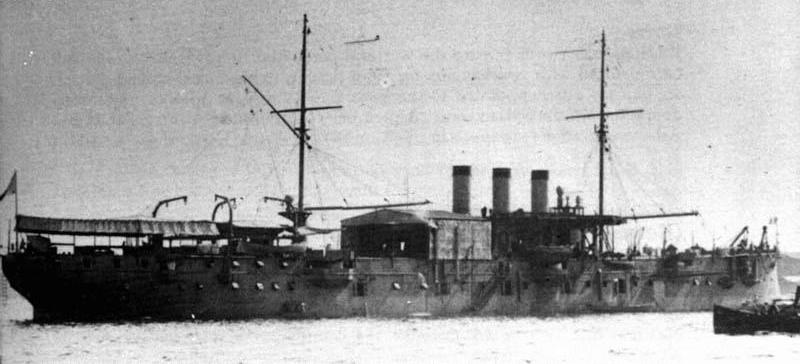
- Foudre, first seaplane carrier in history, with hangar and cranes.

History

France
- Name: Foudre
- Namesake: Lightning
- Builder: Ateliers et Chantiers de la Gironde; Converted to a seaplane carrier at Arsenal de Toulon
- Laid down: 9 June 1892
- Launched: 20 Oct 1895
- Completed: 1896 (as a torpedo boat depot ship)
- Decommissioned: 1 Dec 1921
- Fate: Scrapped

General characteristics
- Type: Torpedo boat tender / Seaplane carrier
- Tonnage: 6,100 tonnes (6,004 long tons)
- Length: 118.8 m (389 ft 9 in)
- Beam: 15.5 m (50 ft 10 in)
- Draught: 7 m (23 ft 0 in)
- Installed power: 12,000 shp (8,948 kW)
- Propulsion: Triple expansion engines, 24 boilers, 2 shafts
- Speed: 19 knots (35 km/h)
- Boats & landing craft carried: 8 torpedo boats
- Complement: 430
- Armament: 8 × 100 mm (4 in) guns; 4 × 65 mm (2.6 in) guns; 2 × torpedo tubes
- Armour: Deck : 120 mm (4.7 in)
- Aircraft carried: 4 seaplanes after conversion

Foudre was a French seaplane carrier, the first in history. Her development followed the invention of the seaplane in 1910 with the French Le Canard.

== Design and construction ==
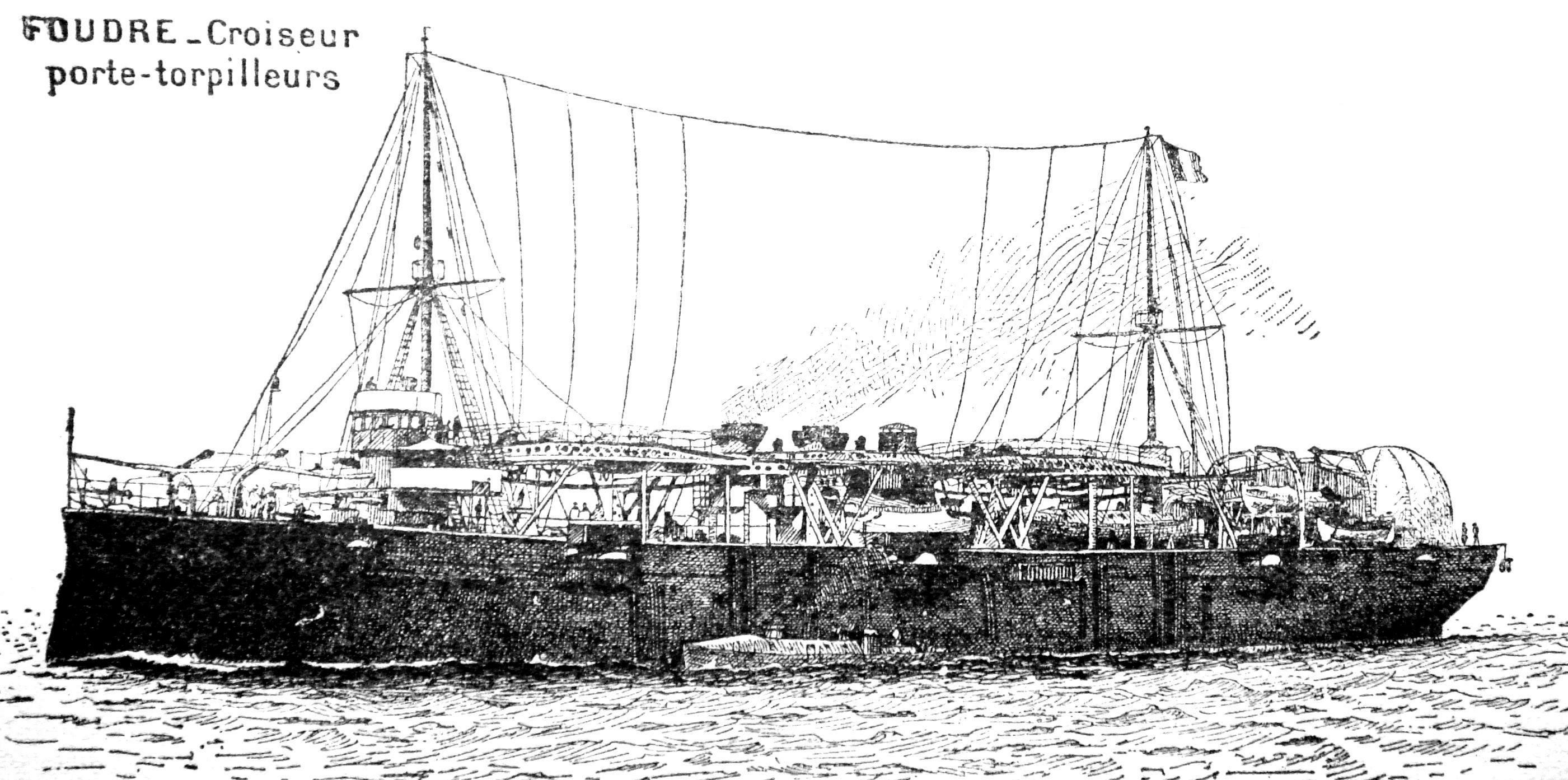
Foudre as a torpedo boat tender.

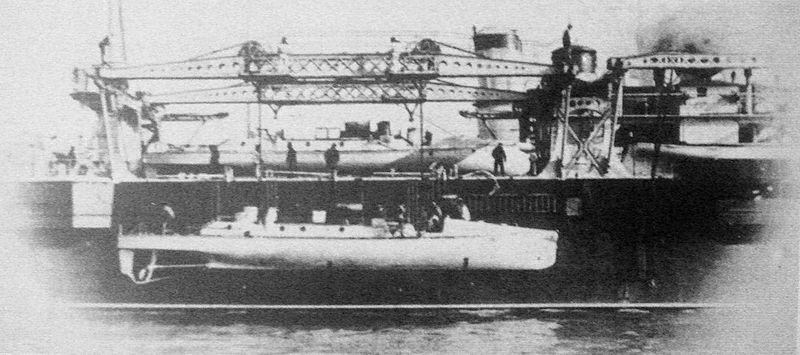
Foudre tending torpedo boats.

In 1877, a French Commission on Underwater Defence investigated proposals of very small torpedo boats that could be carried by large warships, and as a result ordered two 18.3 m (60 ft; 720 in) long torpedo launches (No. 29 and No. 30) (designated Torpilleurs Vedettes) from the British company Thornycroft, which were followed by a further four similar boats (Nos. 56–59), while the transport Japon was converted to carry the launches for trials, which started in 1881. In 1890, it was decided to build a replacement for Japon, and the new ship, originally to be named Seine, was laid down on 9 June 1892 at the Forges et Chantiers de la Gironde shipyard at Lormont. The ship was renamed Foudre during construction, and was launched on 20 October 1895 and completed in 1896.

Foudre was 116.0 m (380 ft 7 in) long overall and 106.7 m (350 ft), with a beam of 15.60 m (51 ft 2 in) and a draught of 7.14 m (23 ft 5 in). Displacement was 6,090 t (5,994 long tons). Two triple expansion engines were fed by 24 coal-fired boilers and drove two propeller shafts. The machinery was rated at 11,500 ihp (8,600 kW), giving a speed of 19 kn (22 mph; 35 km/h).

The ship had an arched protective armour deck, with a thickness of between 117–58 mm (4.6–2.3 in), while the ship's conning tower was protected by 120 mm (4.7 in) of armour. Armament consisted of eight 100 mm M1891 guns, four 65 mm M1891 guns and four 47 mm M1885 guns. Eight torpedo launches could be carried, either the original boats tested by Japon or eight boats built to a new design (A–B and D–I) from 1894.

== Torpedo boat tender ==
Foudre was first commissioned in 1896 as a torpedo boat tender (Croiseur porte-torpilleurs), with the role of helping bring torpedo boats to the high seas, and launch them for attack. She was then modified as repair ship in 1907, as a minelayer in 1910, as a seaplane carrier in 1911 (depot, transport, and launch by crane), and seaplane carrier with a flying-off deck in 1913. She was initially converted to carry torpedo-carrying planes in hangars on the main deck. They were lowered on the sea with a crane.

== First seaplane carrier ==
In April 1910, Vice-Admiral Auguste Boué de Lapeyrère, Navy Minister, established a committee to study the usage of balloons and planes by the navy.

=== Seaplane tender ===
On 29 November 1911 a navy airbase was established at Fréjus Saint-Raphaël, and the torpedo boat tender Foudre was sent to the naval yard in Toulon to be converted as a seaplane tender. The ship was fitted out in a totally new way. A deck was installed at the bow for the seaplane to take off. The seaplane would land on the water, and be craned on board for stowing.

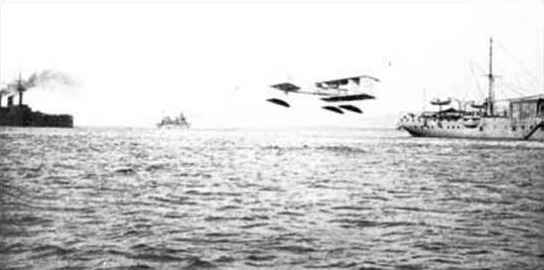
Tactical exercises of the seaplane Canard Voisin with the seaplane carrier Foudre, in June 1912.

A float-equipped Canard Voisin seaplane was bought by the navy for this purpose in December 1911. Foudre would be stationed at Fréjus, working as a seaplane tender, allowing for stowage, repair and supply of the seaplanes. The ship was armed on 15 April 1912, and trials with the Canard Voisin then started.

On 1 May 1912 the Navy Ministry purchased several more seaplanes, a monoplane Breguet with a single float, a Nieuport with double float, and a converted Farman biplane.

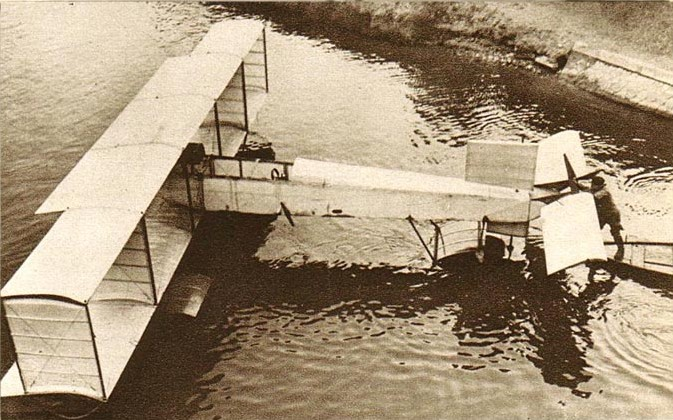
Canard Voisin seaplane under trial in August 1911.

Experiments at sea started with Foudre in July 1912 during tactical exercises in the Mediterranean. The Canard Voisin, and a new foldable Nieuport were used. During the exercises, in which a wargame simulated the fight of two rival navies, the use of the Nieuport allowed the discovery of a surprise attack by the "adversary". During the summer of 1912 many flights of the Canard Voisin from Foudre were accomplished in the bay of Saint-Raphaël.

By the middle of 1913, the navy had 11 seaplane pilots. Foudre was again used in large-scale naval exercises. One of its planes, a Nieuport used for observations, foiled a "surprise attack" by a group of warships. Five more seaplanes were ordered following these exercises.

=== Liftoff platform experiments ===
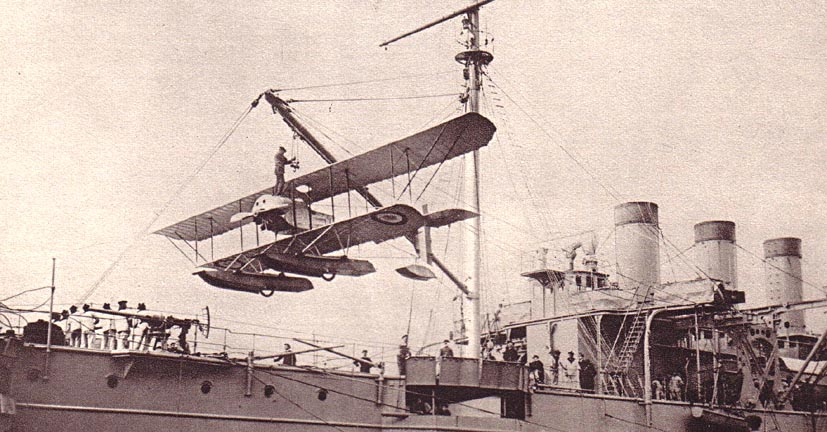
A Caudron seaplane, being craned on La Foudre in April 1914.

In November 1913, a 10-meter flying-off deck was installed, with the objective of using it for a Caudron G.3 seaplane. The plane successfully lifted off from the ship on 8 May 1914. At the beginning of the war, the platform was dismantled, and further experiments were postponed to a later date.

== World War I ==
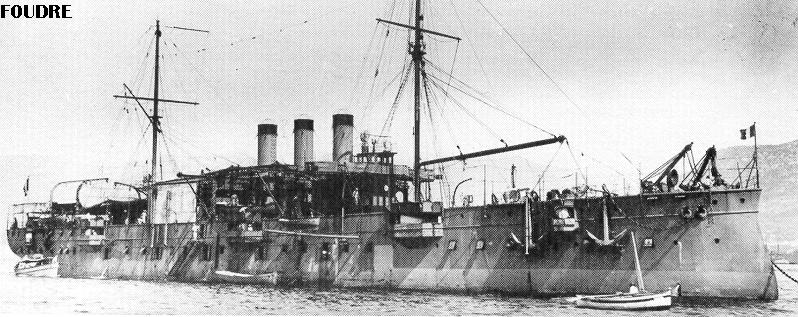
Foudre circa 1914.

During World War I her roles were numerous, ranging from submarine tender to seaplane/aircraft transport, and headquarters ship in 1916. She was employed as an aviation school ship after the war.

== Bibliography ==
- Chesneau, Roger; Kolesnik, Eugene M., eds. (1979). Conway's All The World's Fighting Ships 1860–1905. London: Conway Maritime Press. ISBN 0-85177-133-5.
- Gibbs, Jay (2015). "Question 26/51: Torpedo Boat Carriers". Warship International. LII (3): 212–214. ISSN 0043-0374.
- Layman, R. D. (1989). Before the Aircraft Carrier: The Development of Aviation Vessels 1849–1922. London: Conway Maritime Press. ISBN 0-85177-516-0.
- Roberts, Stephen S. (2021). French Warships in the Age of Steam 1859–1914. Barnsley, UK: Seaforth Publishing. ISBN 978-1-5267-4534-7.
- Le Roy, Thierry (January 1996). "L'escadrille de Port Said: Première escadrille de l'aviation maritime française 1914–1916 (1^{e} partie)" [The Port Said Squadron: The First French Naval Aviation Squadron 1914–1916]. Avions: Toute l'aéronautique et son histoire (in French) (34): 29–31. ISSN 1243-8650.
- Le Roy, Thierry (February 1996). "L'escadrille de Port Said: Première escadrille de l'aviation maritime française 1914–1916 (2^{e} partie)". Avions: Toute l'aéronautique et son histoire (in French) (35): 18–21. ISSN 1243-8650.
- Le Roy, Thierry (March 1996). "L'escadrille de Port Said: Première escadrille de l'aviation maritime française 1914–1916 (Fin)". Avions: Toute l'aéronautique et son histoire (in French) (36): 31–36. ISSN 1243-8650.
