= Torpedo boat tender =

Ship used to service fast self-propelled weapon carriers at sea

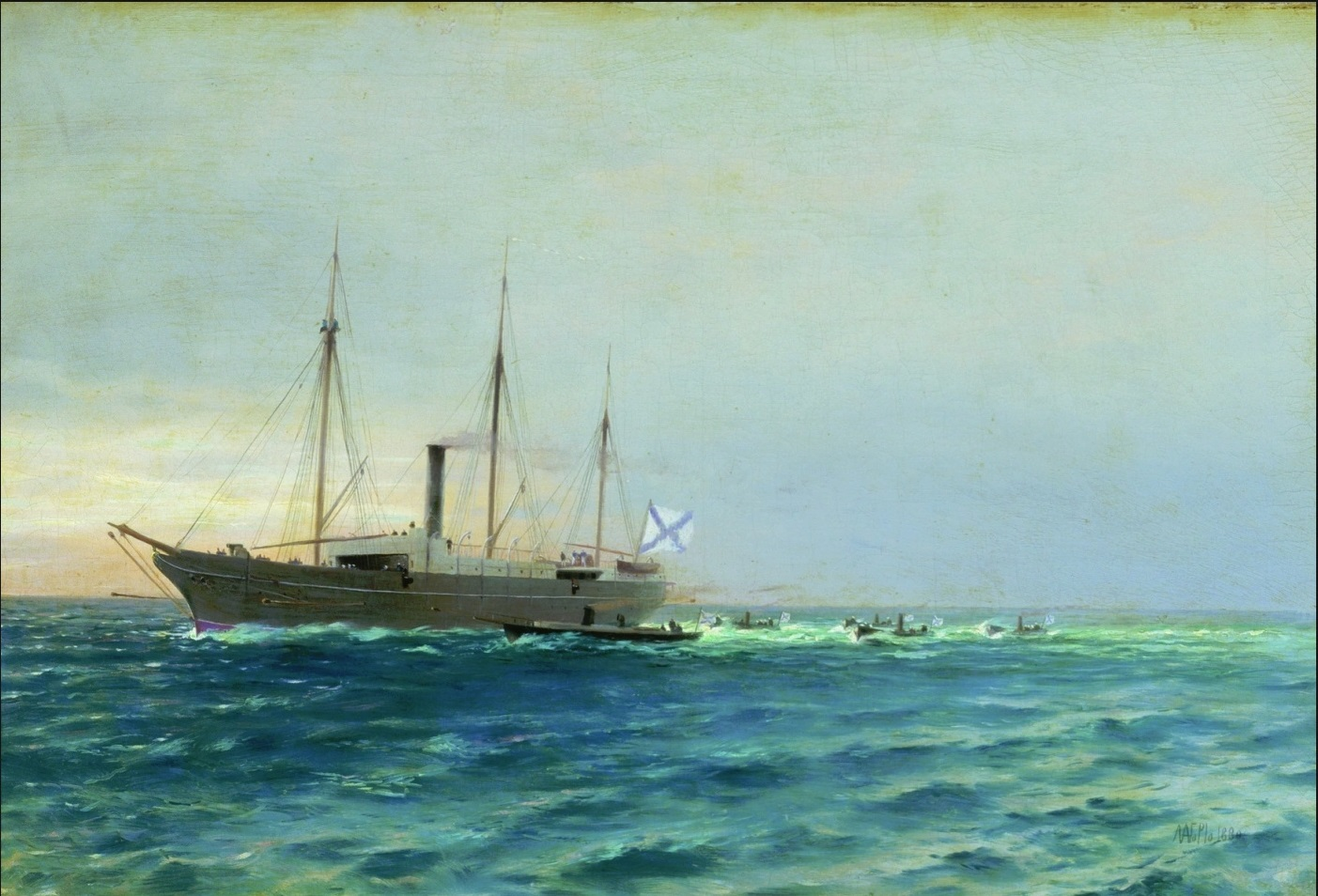
Velikiy Knyaz Konstantin, the first torpedo boat tender in history.

The torpedo boat tender was a type of warship developed at the end of the 19th century to help bring small torpedo boats to the high seas, and launch them for attack.

During the Turko-Russian war in 1877, the Russians requisitioned 19 trade vessels to convert them as torpedo boat tenders. Velikiy Knyaz Konstantin was the first historical vessel in this new ship class. She was captained by Stepan Makarov, who was major naval engineer, early practitioner of torpedo usage and the author of concept of torpedo boat tender. On 14 January 1878, Makarov performed the first successful attack by self-propelled torpedoes in history. The Turkish ship Intibah was destroyed by torpedo boats launched from Velikiy Knyaz Konstantin.

In 1878, the British Navy commissioned the Hecla as a torpedo boat tender, followed by HMS Vulcan (1889). The 1896 French ship Foudre was a torpedo boat tender, before it was converted to a seaplane carrier.

During World War II, the type evolved and in the US adopted the designation of motor torpedo boat tender (AGP, or "Patrol Craft Tender", according to the United States Navy hull classification system).

== Gallery ==
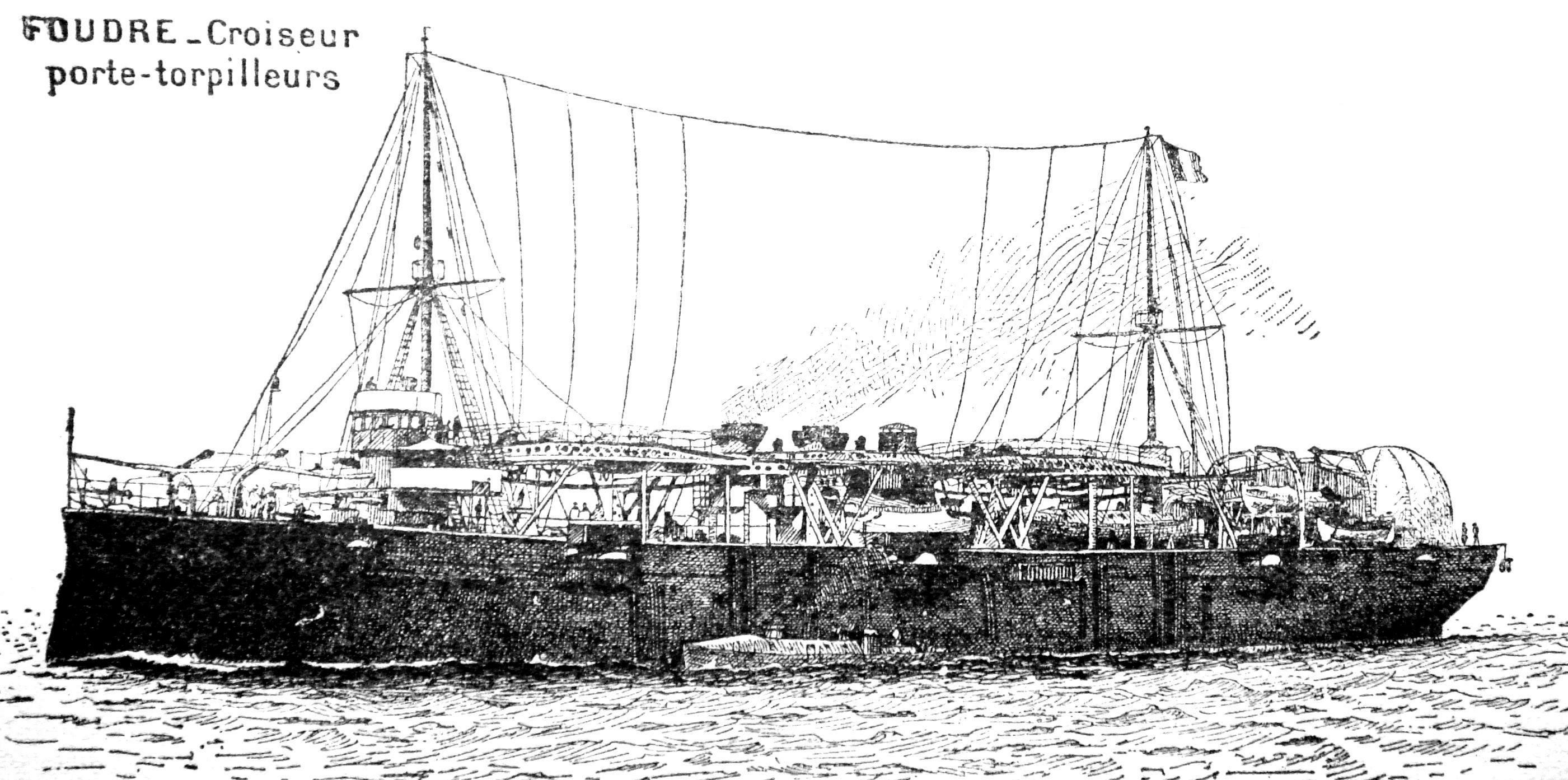
The 1896 torpedo boat tender Foudre

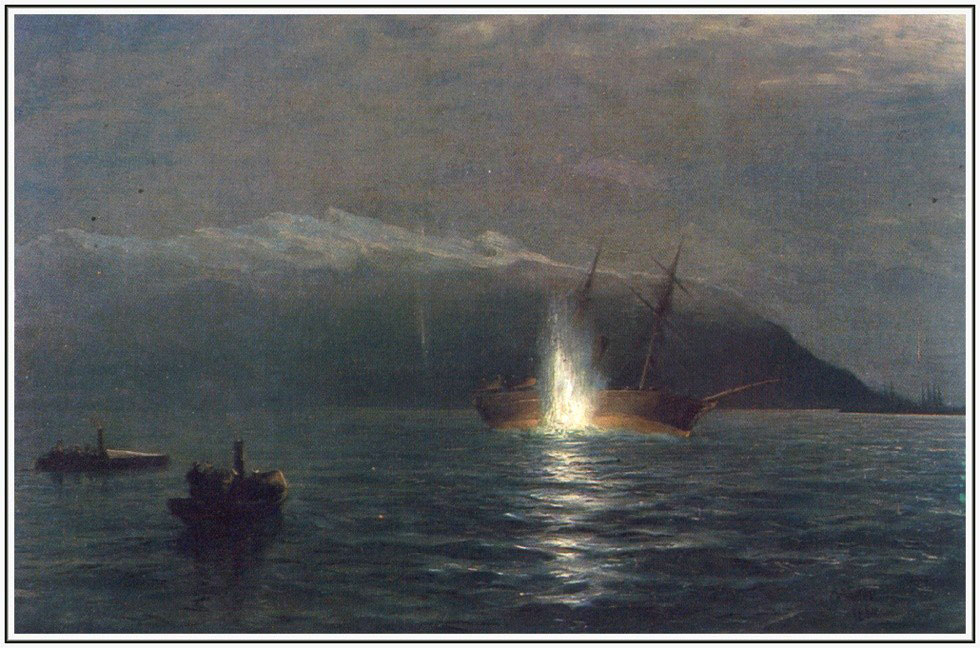
A painting by Lev Lagorio of the first successful attack by self-propelled torpedoes: The Turkish ship Intibah is destroyed by torpedo boats from the Russian torpedo boat tender Velikiy Knyaz Konstantin

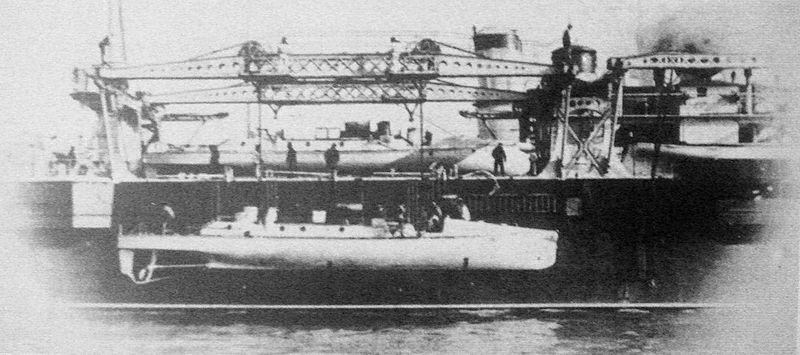
Foudre tending torpedo boats
