= Henri Fabre =

19/20th-century French aviator and inventor of the seaplane

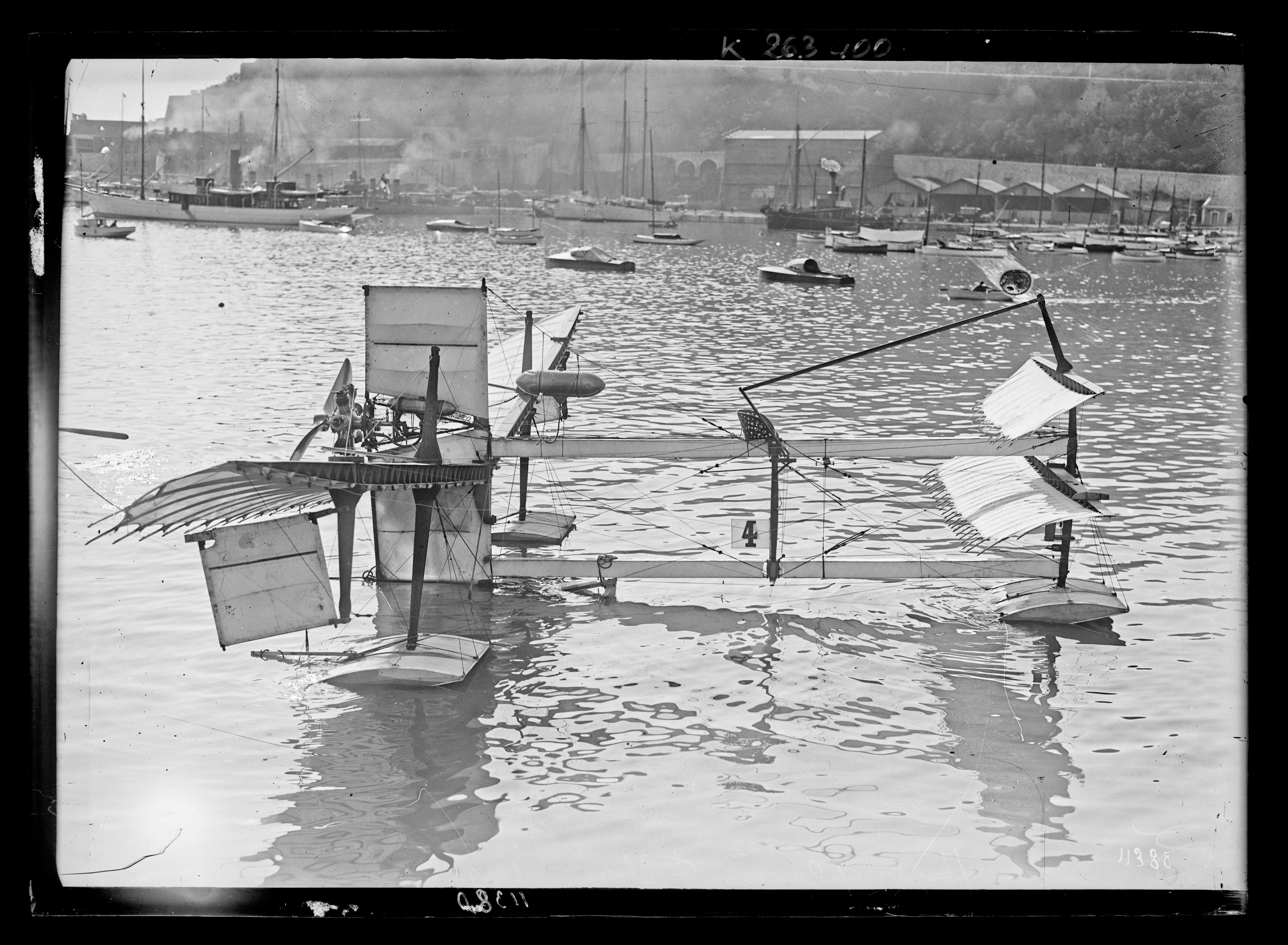
- A Fabre Hydroplane at Monaco in April 1911
- Born: 29 November 1882; Marseille, France
- Died: 30 June 1984 (aged 101); Le Touvet, France
- Resting place: Le Touvet, France
- Occupations: Pilot, businessman, engineer

Henri Fabre (French pronunciation: [ɑ̃ʁi fabʁ]; 29 November 1882 – 30 June 1984) was a French aviator and the inventor of the first successful seaplane, the Fabre Hydravion.

Henri Fabre was born into a prominent family of shipowners in the city of Marseille. He was educated in the Jesuit College of Marseilles where he undertook advanced studies in sciences.

He intensively studied aeroplane and propeller designs. He patented a system of flotation devices which he used when he succeeded in taking off from the surface of the Etang de Berre on 28 March 1910. On that day, he completed four consecutive flights, the longest about 600 metres. the Hydravion has survived and is displayed in the Musée de l'Air in Paris. Henri Fabre was soon contacted by Glenn Curtiss and Gabriel Voisin who used his invention to develop their own seaplanes.

As late as 1971, Fabre said he was still sailing his own boat single-handedly in Marseille harbour.

He died at the age of 101 as one of the last living pioneers of human flight.
