= Timbalier Bay =

Coordinates: 29°09′43″N 90°20′53″W

Timbalier Bay is a bay in southeastern Louisiana in the United States.

The bay is an inlet of the Gulf of Mexico and lies near New Orleans along the southwestern coast of Lafouche Parish. Timbalier Island lies between Barataria Bay and the Gulf of Mexico.

The United States Navy seaplane tender USS Timbalier, in commission from 1946 to 1954, was named for Timbalier Bay.
