= Voisin Canard =

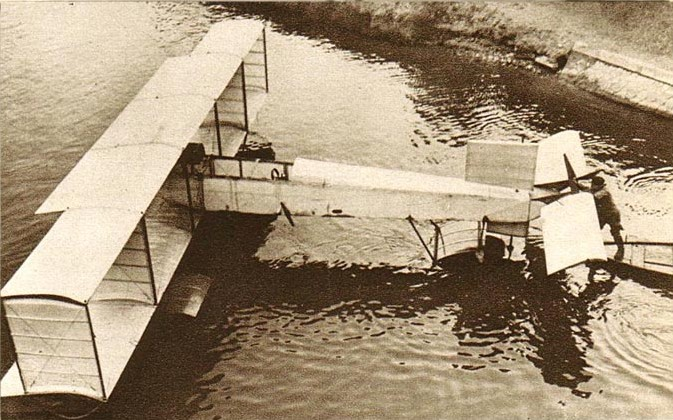
- Voisin Canard floatplane being tested on the Seine, 3 August 1911. The front of the aircraft is on the right.

General information
- National origin: France
- Manufacturer: Frères Voisin
- Designer: Gabriel Voisin

History
- Introduction date: 1911
- First flight: February 1911

The Voisin Canard was an aircraft developed by the Voisin brothers during 1910 and first flown early in 1911. It was named the Canard because of the resemblance of its forward fuselage to that of a duck's long neck while in flight. It was originally flown as a landplane: with the addition of floats it became one of the first seaplanes used by the French Navy.

== Design and development ==
The Canard was, even by the standards of 1910, a curiously regressive design, its layout reminiscent of Alberto Santos-Dumont's 14-bis of 1906.

As first flown at Issy-les-Moulineaux by Maurice Colliex, the aircraft had an uncovered fuselage of wire-braced wood construction with the 50 hp (37 kW) Rossel-Peugeot rotary engine at the rear and the front-mounted control surfaces consisting of an all-moving elevator divided into two halves, one either side of the fuselage, a rectangular balanced rudder mounted above the elevator, and a pair of short-span fixed horizontal surfaces with a high angle of attack mounted behind and below the elevators. Voisin's characteristic side-curtains were fitted to the outermost pair of interplane struts and roll control was achieved using trailing-edge ailerons on both upper and lower wings.

The aircraft was judged a success and Voisin manufactured a number of examples. There are variations between the individual production aircraft: the two examples flown in the French military aircraft trials in 1911 had a wingspan of 15 m (49 ft 3 in).; one was powered by a 56 kW (75 hp) Renault and the second by a 97 kW (130 hp) Gnome. The number of sets of side curtains varied, some aircraft having two or even three sets.

== Seaplane version ==
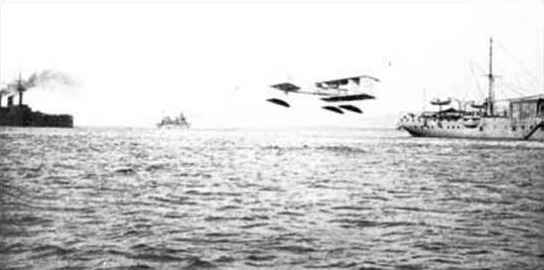
La Foudre with one of her Voisin Canard seaplanes during tactical exercises in June 1912.

The seaplane variant, fitted with floats designed by Henri Fabre, was initially built to the order of Prince Bibesco, who intended to use it make a flight across the Black Sea. It was first successfully flown from water on 25 April 1911.

One example was bought by the French navy in March 1912 to equip the seaplane tender La Foudre, the first seaplane carrier in history. A second example was delivered to the Navy in December 1913.

== Specifications ==
Data from Flight, 30 December 1911 p.1137

General characteristics

- Crew: 1
- Capacity: 2
- Length: 7.9 m (26 ft)
- Wingspan: 12 m (40 ft)
- Wing area: 43.9 m^{2} (473 sq ft)
- Gross weight: 549 kg (1,210 lb)
- Powerplant: 1 × Gnome 7-cylinder air-cooled radial, 52 kW (70 hp)

Performance

- Maximum speed: 90 km/h (56 mph, 49 kn)
