= Tonalá =

Tonalá may refer to:

== Places ==
- Santo Domingo Tonalá, a municipality in the Mexican state of Oaxaca
- Tonalá, Jalisco, a municipality in the Mexican state of Jalisco
- Tonalá, Chiapas, a municipality in the Mexican state of Chiapas
- Tonalá (Maya site), an archaeological site of the pre-Columbian Maya civilization, in the Chiapas highlands

== Other ==
- Tonalá River, in Southeastern Mexico
