= Ozenay =

- Commune
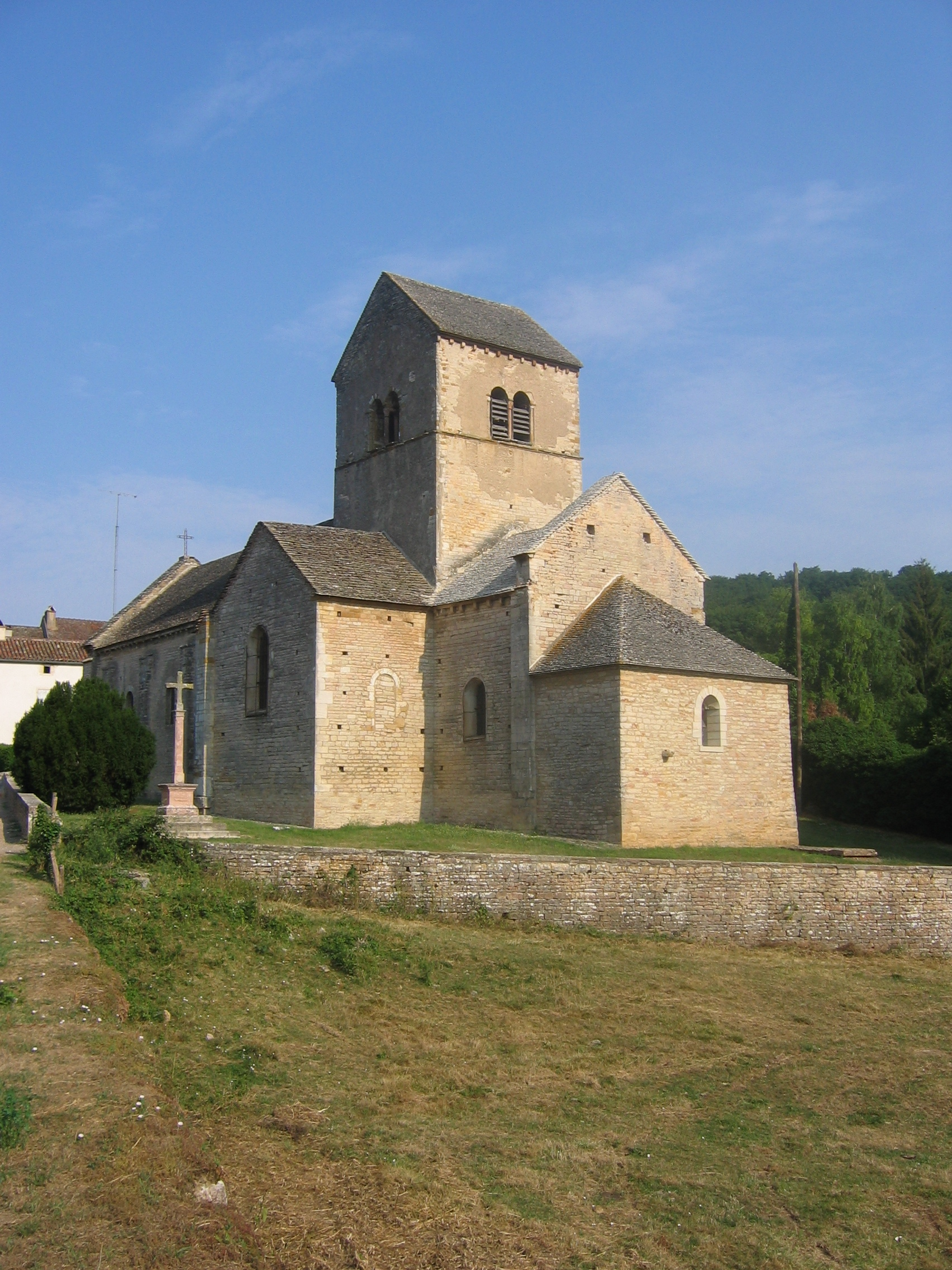
- The church in Ozenay
- Location of Ozenay
- Location within France Location within Bourgogne-Franche-Comté
- Coordinates: 46°32′42″N 4°51′14″E
- Country: France
- Region: Bourgogne-Franche-Comté
- Department: Saône-et-Loire
- Arrondissement: Mâcon
- Canton: Tournus
- Area^{1}: 13.31 km^{2} (5.14 sq mi)
- Elevation: 220 m (720 ft)
- Highest elevation: 399 m (1,309 ft)
- Lowest elevation: 224 m (735 ft)
- Population (2023): 237
  - Density: 17.8/km^{2} (46.1/sq mi)
- Time zone: UTC+01:00 (CET)
  - Summer (DST): UTC+02:00 (CEST)
- INSEE/Postal code: 71338 /71700
- ^{1} French Land Register data, which excludes lakes, ponds, glaciers > 1 km^{2} (0.386 sq mi or 247 acres) and river estuaries.

Ozenay (French pronunciation: [oznɛ]) is a commune in the Saône-et-Loire department in the region of Bourgogne-Franche-Comté in eastern France.

== See also ==
- Communes of the Saône-et-Loire department
