= Charles Voisin =

French aviator (1882–1912)

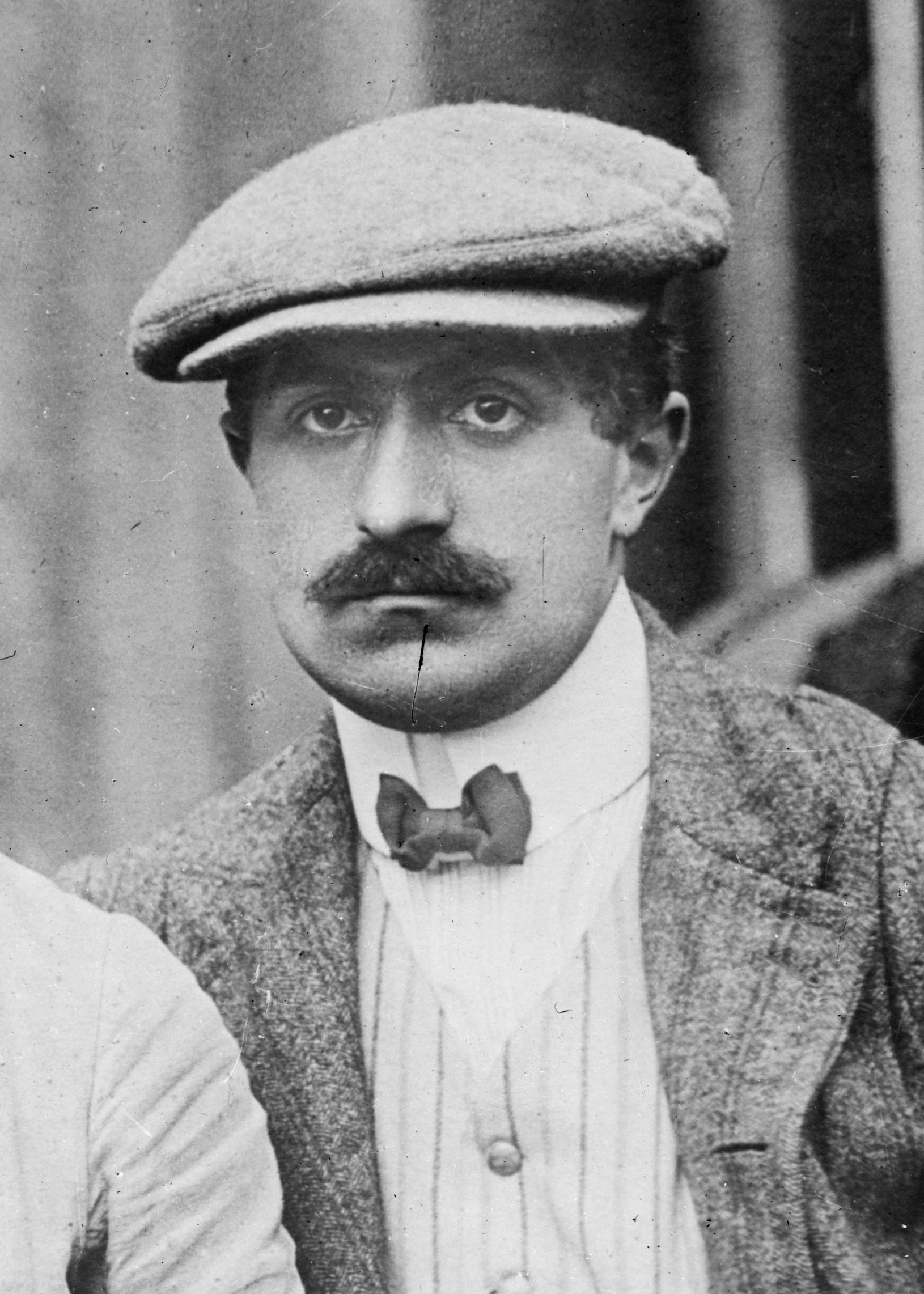
Charles Voisin

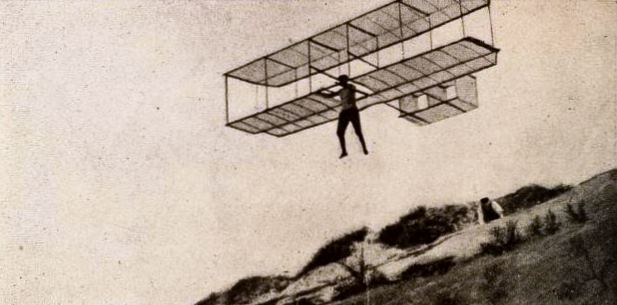
Voisin using a Chanute glider

Charles Voisin (French pronunciation: [ʃaʁl vwazɛ̃]; 12 July 1882 in Lyon – 26 September 1912 in Belleville-sur-Saône) was an early aviation pioneer from France. He was the younger brother of Gabriel Voisin, also an aviation pioneer.

== Biography ==
Charles joined his brother in 1906 and the Appareils d'Aviation Les Frères Voisin ("Voisin Brothers' Flying Machines") was formed. Their first successful plane was built in 1907. This machine, a pusher biplane powered by an Antoinette engine, was built for Leon Delagrange and was tested by Charles in February–April before being handed over to him. The first powered flight was made on 16 March 1907, when Charles flew for 10 metres at Neuilly-Bagatelle.

Voisins' aircraft became a significant advance in the aviation history. Record breaking flier Henri Farman flew a Voisin pusher biplane in most of his early flights, notably so when he became first in Europe to successfully complete a 1 km closed circuit at Issy-les-Moulineaux on January 13, 1908. Charles Voisin was present on the ground during this historic flight.

Charles Voisin was killed in an automobile accident on 26 September 1912 near Belleville-sur-Saône. The early woman aviator Baroness de Laroche was injured in the same accident.
