= Russian tender Veliky Knyaz Konstantin =

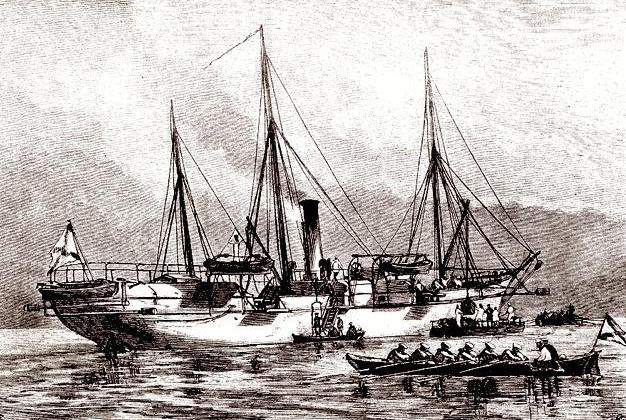
- Veliky Knyaz Konstantin

History

Russia
- Name: Veliky Knyaz Konstantin

General characteristics
- Type: Torpedo boat tender
- Displacement: 2,500 t (2,461 long tons)
- Length: 73 m (239 ft 6 in)
- Beam: 8.5 m (27 ft 11 in)
- Draught: 4.6 m (15 ft 1 in)
- Speed: 12.7 knots (14.6 mph; 23.5 km/h)
- Armament: 4 × 9-pounder rifled guns; 1 × 152 mm (6 in) mortar

Veliky Knyaz Konstantin (Russian: Великий князь Константин) was the name of a torpedo boat tender of the Russian Navy named after the Grand Duke (Veliky Knyaz) Konstantin of Russia, and which served in the Russo-Turkish War of 1877-78. Stepan Osipovich Makarov, a famous Russian Navy commander, was the captain of the ship.

She was laid down as a passenger ship, but was fitted out as a torpedo boat tender to the design of Stepan Makarov in 1877. She carried four small torpedo boats: Chesma (Чесма), Sinop (Синоп), Navarin (Наварин) and Miner (Минер).

On 18 June 1877, she captured and sunk three or four Ottoman schooners in the Black Sea. Their crews were rescued and landed. The first vessel ever sunk by self-propelled torpedoes was the Turkish steamer Intibah, on 16 January 1878, during the Russo-Turkish War of 1877–78. She was hit by torpedoes launched from torpedo boats operating from the tender under the command of Stepan Osipovich Makarov.
