= Santo Domingo Tonalá =

- Municipality and town
- Location in Mexico
- Coordinates: 17°40′N 97°59′W
- Country: Mexico
- State: Oaxaca
- Time zone: UTC-6 (Central Standard Time)

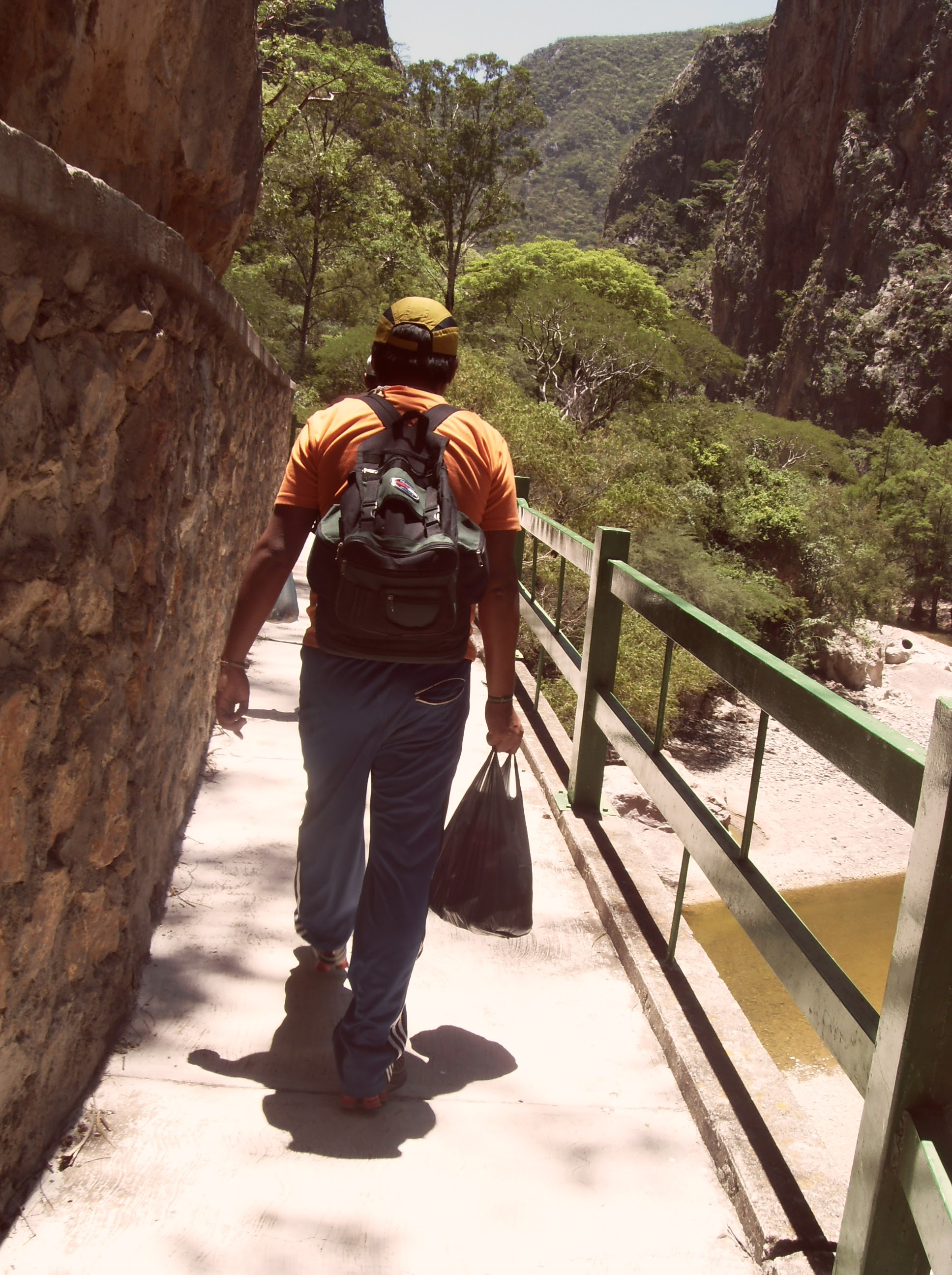
Walking on the Huajuapan-Tonalá highway, Oaxaca

Santo Domingo Tonalá (Mixtec: Ñuuniñe, 'Place of Heat') is a town and municipality in Oaxaca in south-western Mexico. It is part of the Huajuapan District in the north of the Mixteca Region.

Santo Domingo Tonala is located about 50 km from Huajuapan de León.

== Environment ==
Santo Domingo Tonala has been working with its community to maintain its flora and fauna by educating schools. Signs have been posted to encourage everyone to take care of the environment.

== Economy ==
Tonala has a small population because many have migrated in search of a better living and education.

== Culture ==
During the many festivals, many migrants return to experience its rich culture that attracts tourists as well. The main celebrations are:

- January 7 and 8- Virgen de Juquila
- February 2- Dia de la Candelaria
- Mayo 3rd and 4th- Santa Cruz
- August-Santo Domingo
- November 2-Dia de los Muertos
- December-Posadas

== See also ==
- Tonalá (disambiguation) for other places with this name
