= Gabriel Voisin =

French aviation pioneer (1880–1973)

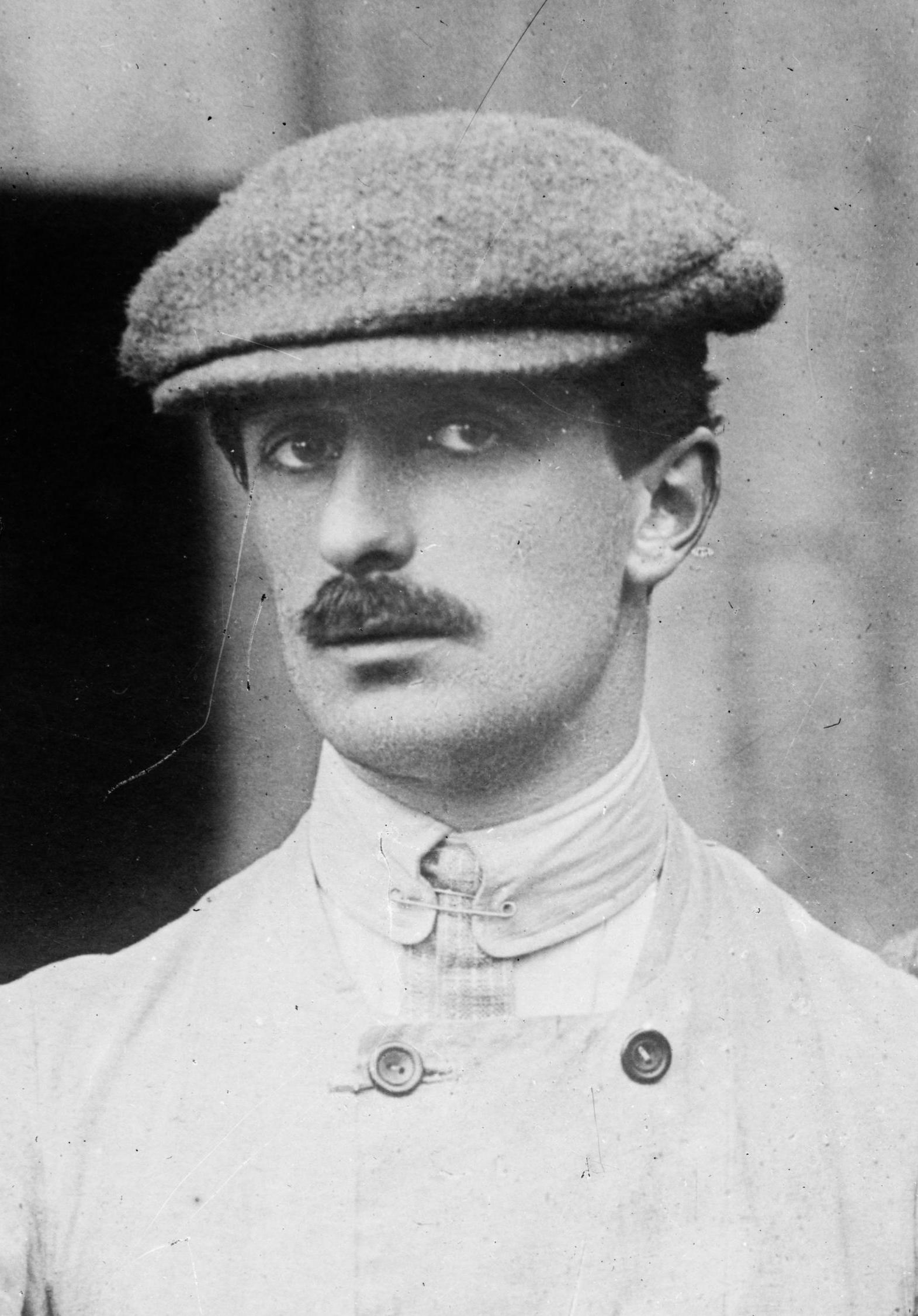
- Born: 5 February 1880; Belleville-sur-Saône, France
- Died: 25 December 1973 (aged 93); Ozenay, Saône-et-Loire, France

Gabriel Voisin (French pronunciation: [ɡabʁijɛl vwazɛ̃]; 5 February 1880 – 25 December 1973) was a French aviation pioneer and the creator of Europe's first manned, engine-powered, heavier-than-air aircraft capable of a sustained (1 km), circular, controlled flight, which was made by Henri Farman on 13 January 1908 near Paris, France. During World War I, the company founded by Voisin became a major producer of military aircraft, notably the Voisin III. Subsequently, he switched to the design and production of luxury automobiles under the name Avions Voisin.

== Early life ==
Gabriel Voisin was born on 5 February 1880 in Belleville-sur-Saône, France, and his brother Charles Voisin, two years younger than him, was his main childhood companion. When his father abandoned the family, his mother, Amélie, took her sons to Neuville-sur-Saône, where they settled near her father's factory.

Their grandfather, Charles Forestier, took charge of the boys' education with military rigor. The boys also went for expeditions along the river, went fishing, and built numerous contraptions. When his grandfather died, Gabriel was sent to school in Lyon and Paris, where he learned industrial design, a field Voisin claims to have been exceptionally gifted. He often returned home, and by the end of the century, the brothers had built, among other things, a rifle, a steamboat, and an automobile.

== Early flying experiments ==
After completing his studies at the Ecole des Beaux-Arts de Lyon in 1899, he joined an architectural firm in Paris. While in Paris, he saw the Clément Ader Avion III, which was displayed at the Paris International Exposition of 1900. This awakened an interest in the problems of powered flight. After nine months of military service, in February 1904, he attended a lecture given by Captain Ferdinand Ferber, one of the leading figures in French aviation circles at the time. After the lecture, Voisin approached Ferber and was given an introduction to Ernest Archdeacon, the leading promoter and financial supporter of early French aviation, and Archdeacon hired him to test fly the Wright-type glider that he had built. The tests took place at Berck-sur-Mer in April 1904, and some short flights of around 20 m (66 ft) were achieved. Archdeacon then commissioned Voisin to build another glider of similar design, but differing in having a fixed horizontal stabiliser behind the wings and its front-mounted elevator. This was tested at Issy-les-Moulineaux on 26 March 1905 by towing it into the air using Archdeacon's automobile. Fortunately, the test was unmanned, the pilot's place being taken by 50 kg (110 lb) of ballast since the aircraft suffered a structural failure and crashed. It was not rebuilt.

Voisin then designed and built a glider equipped with floats for the Archdeacon. This aircraft marks the first use of Hargrave cells, used both for the empennage and the wings. Voisin successfully flew it on 8 June 1905, having been towed into the air behind a motor boat on the river Seine between the Billancourt and Sèvres bridges, managing a flight of about 600 m (2,000 ft). While working on this aircraft, Voisin was approached by Louis Blériot, who asked him to build a similar machine, later known as the Bleriot II. This differed principally in having a smaller span lower wing, resulting in the outer 'side-curtains' between the upper and lower wings angled outwards. After this first flight, Bleriot suggested to Voisin that they form a partnership to build aircraft, so Voisin ended his association with Archdeacon's syndicate. Voisin attempted flights in both aircraft on 18 July 1905. Although the weather was unsuitable, with a strong crosswind, Voisin tried to fly the aircraft since obtaining permission to use the river was difficult. He made a short flight in his glider and then tried a flight in Bleriot's. This took off quickly, but Voisin could not control it, so it crashed into the river. Voisin was trapped inside and was lucky to escape drowning. Louis Bleriot's cine footage of this experiment survives in the Smithsonian's National Air and Space Museum.

The following aircraft built by Voisin for Bleriot in 1906, the Bleriot III, was a tandem biplane powered by an Antoinette engine driving two tractor propellers with the wings formed into a closed ellipse as seen from the front: according to Voisin's account, Bleriot had initially wanted the lifting surfaces to be circular in front elevation, having experimented with models of this form, and the adoption of their eventual form was the result of a compromise between the two men. This aircraft was unsuccessful, as was its subsequent modification (the Blériot IV) in which a conventional biplane arrangement and a second engine added replaced the forward wing. Experiments were made first with floats and then with a wheeled undercarriage, and the aircraft was wrecked in a taxiing accident at Bagatelle on the morning of 12 November 1906. Later that day, also at Bagatelle, Alberto Santos-Dumont succeeded in flying his 14-bis canard biplane for a distance of over 100 metres. After the failure of this machine, Voisin and Blériot dissolved their partnership, and Voisin set up a company with his brother Charles Voisin to design and manufacture aircraft.

== Commercial airplane production: Voisin Frères ==
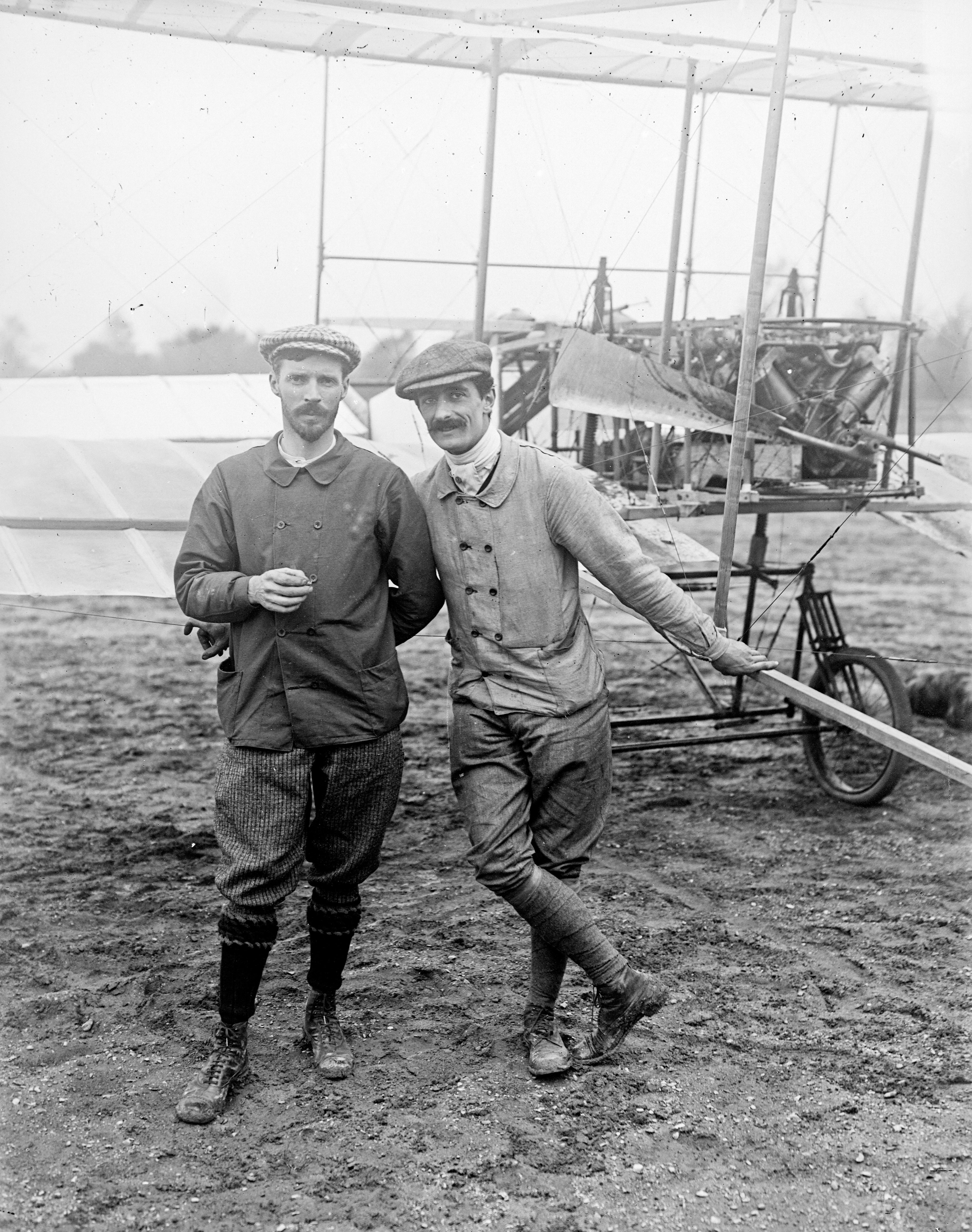
Voisin with Henri Farman (left), 1908

Appareils d'Aviation Les Frères Voisin was the world's first commercial airplane factory. At this time, aspiring European aviators were in fierce competition to be the first to achieve powered heavier-than-air flights. Until Wilbur Wright's demonstrations at Le Mans (France) in August 1908, many people did not believe the claims of the Wright brothers to have achieved sustained flights: for instance, that the Wrights' Flyer III had flown 24 miles (38.9 km) in 39 minutes 23 seconds on 5 October 1905.

Santos-Dumont's flights in the 14-bis, in November 1906, were Europe's first officially observed and verified heavier-than-air powered flights. Despite its fame, all that the 14-bis could achieve was a short flight on a straight line. It had no potential beyond that, and it was quickly abandoned.

Two almost identical pusher biplane machines, with Antoinette engines, were built by the Voisin brothers for two early aviation pioneers: the first for Leon Delagrange in March 1907, and the second for his friend and rival Henry Farman in October 1907. The second one became known as the Voisin-Farman I, and was flown by Farman to win Archdeacon's Grand Prix d'Aviation for making the first one-kilometer closed-circuit flight on 13 January 1908. Both Farman and Delagrange won great fame with these aircraft, competing with each other for aviation records. The Voisins' machines became widely known as Europe's first successful aircraft.

In 1909, Voisin was made a Chevalier of the French Legion of Honor, and along with Blériot was awarded the Prix Osiris, awarded by the Institut de France. In the same year, Voisin married Adrienne-Lola Bernet; they had one daughter, Janine.

Later, Farman modified and improved the Voisin pusher biplane considerably. He eventually ended his cooperation with the Voisin brothers, following a disagreement, and started manufacturing his own designs, which became very successful. The Voisin brothers continued the expansion of their factory, resulting, for example, in the Canard Voisin of 1911.

== After the death of Charles Voisin: Aéroplanes G. Voisin ==
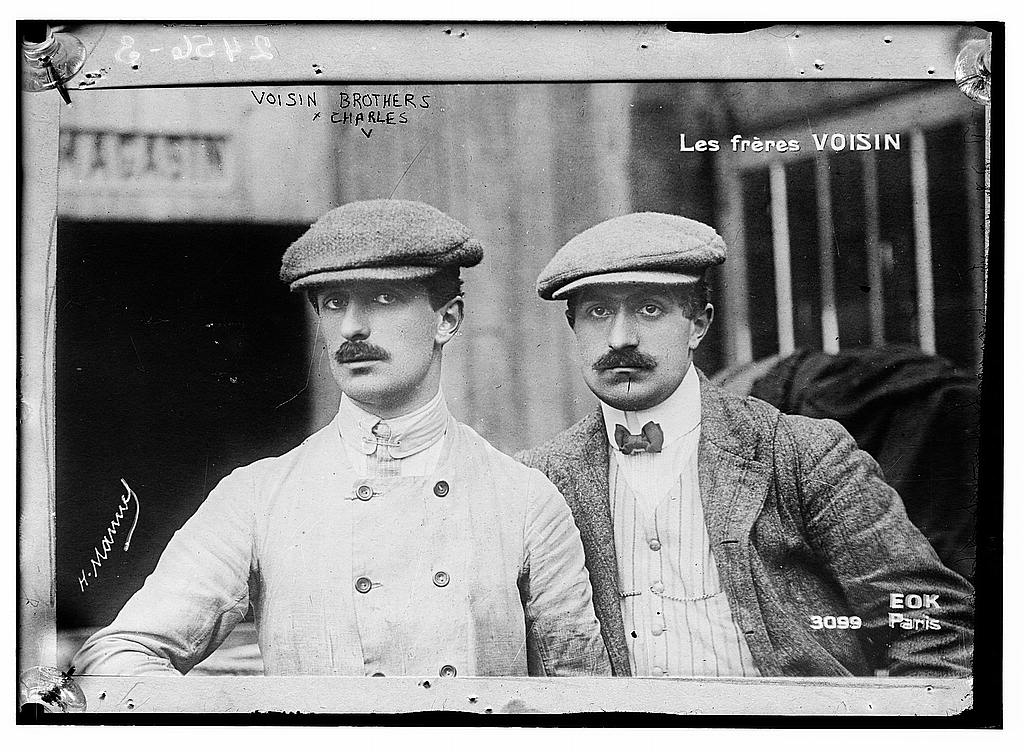
Gabriel (left) and Charles Voisin in 1906

Voisin was greatly affected by the death of his brother Charles in 1912 in an automobile accident near Belleville-sur-Saône. Still, he continued the expansion of the Boulogne-Billancourt factory under the changed name Société Anonyme des Aéroplanes G. Voisin.

After 1912, the factory shifted its manufacturing and sales towards supplying the French military. When World War I broke out in 1914, Voisin immediately volunteered for service with the French Air Corps. The Voisin III, a two-seater pusher biplane with a 120 hp Salmson radial engine, was extensively used for bombing and observation missions during World War I. It had a light steel frame and thus could be stationed outdoors. The Voisin III was built in large numbers (about 1,000) between 1914 and 1916 and sold not only to the French air services but also to other allies, including Russia. The Type VIII (about 1,100 built) and Type X (about 900 built) were delivered in 1917 and 1918. Those last to appear Voisin military aircraft were almost identical in appearance to the Voisin III, although they were heavier and featured twice as powerful Peugeot and Renault engines. They also had a longer range and carried almost twice the bomb load of their predecessor. A complete and original Voisin Type VIII bomber aircraft is preserved in excellent condition at the Smithsonian's National Air and Space Museum in Washington, D.C. It is the oldest preserved bomber aircraft in the world.

== Switch to car production: Avions Voisin ==
Voisin abandoned aviation, citing the trauma of the military use of his more advanced airplanes (the Voisin III) during the war in addition to the then embryonic demand for civilian aircraft. From then until 1958, he concentrated his efforts on making automobiles under the brand of Avions Voisin. His early cars were some of the finest luxury vehicles in the world, with unique technical details. Many of them won in competition. However, the luxury car market shrank in the 1930s because of depressed economic conditions followed in June 1940 by the invasion of France by Nazi Germany forcing him to close down his factory. "In 1939, a certain Hitler unleashed the regrettable chain of events that French people are all too familiar with." - Gabriel Voisin. After 1945, he turned his attention to designing a minimalist car for the masses, the Biscooter, thousands of which were produced under licence in Spain during the 1950s as the Biscúter. Today, his pre-war luxury automobiles have become highly prized by collectors, both in Europe and in the USA.

In the 1920s, the company also proposed a 'Motor-Fly' which was a bicycle with a small auxiliary 2-stroke engine added to the back wheel, and also produced pre-fabricated houses that could be built in 3 days ('votre maison en trois jours - your house in 3 days'). These were available with a floor area of 35, 75 or 105 square meters, and were constructed around a metal framework. Some of these houses still exist, but none in their original condition. The houses carry the logo 'Avion Voisin Issy', just like the other products from the factory.

== Death ==
In 1960 he retired to his country house, "La Cadolle", at Le Villars near Tournus on the banks of the Saône river, where he wrote his memoirs. A few years later, in 1965, he was made a Commander of the Legion d'Honneur. He died on Christmas Day, 25 December 1973, in Ozenay, Saône-et-Loire at the age of 93. He was buried at Le Villars.

== See also ==
- Léon Lemartin – engineer on the Seine glider and the Gnome Omega rotary engine.
