= USS Timbalier =

Tender of the United States Navy

USS Timbalier (AVP-54)
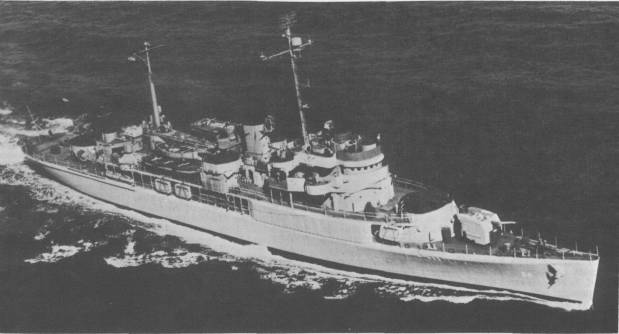
- USS Timbalier underway ca. 1946

History

United States
- Namesake: Timbalier Bay in Louisiana
- Builder: Lake Washington Shipyard, Houghton, Washington
- Laid down: 9 November 1942
- Launched: 18 April 1943
- Sponsored by: Mrs. S. B. Dunlap
- Commissioned: 24 May 1946
- Decommissioned: 15 November 1954
- Stricken: 1 May 1960
- Identification: IMO number: 5298470
- Fate: Sold 20 December 1960

Greece
- Name: MV Ródos
- Namesake: Rhodes
- Acquired: 22 December 1960
- Fate: Scrapped 1989

General characteristics
- Class & type: Barnegat-class seaplane tender
- Displacement: 1,766 tons (light); 2,750 tons (full load)
- Length: 311 ft 8 in (95.00 m)
- Beam: 41 ft 1 in (12.52 m)
- Draft: 13 ft 6 in (4.11 m)
- Installed power: 6,000 hp (4,500 kW) Diesel engines
- Propulsion: Two shafts
- Speed: 18.6 knots (34.4 km/h; 21.4 mph)
- Complement: 215 (ship's company); 367 (including aviation unit)
- Sensors & processing systems: Radar; sonar
- Armament: 1 × single 5 in (130 mm)/38 caliber dual-purpose gun mount; 1 × quad 40 mm antiaircraft gun mount; 2 × dual 40mm antiaircraft gun mounts; 2 × depth charge tracks
- Aviation facilities: Supplies, spare parts, repairs, and berthing for one seaplane squadron; 80,000 US gallons (300,000 L) aviation fuel

USS Timbalier (AVP-54) was a Barnegat-class seaplane tender of the United States Navy. She was commissioned shortly after the end of World War II, and served between 1946 and her decommissioning in 1954. She later saw commercial service as the Greek cruise ship MV Ródos.

== Construction and commissioning ==
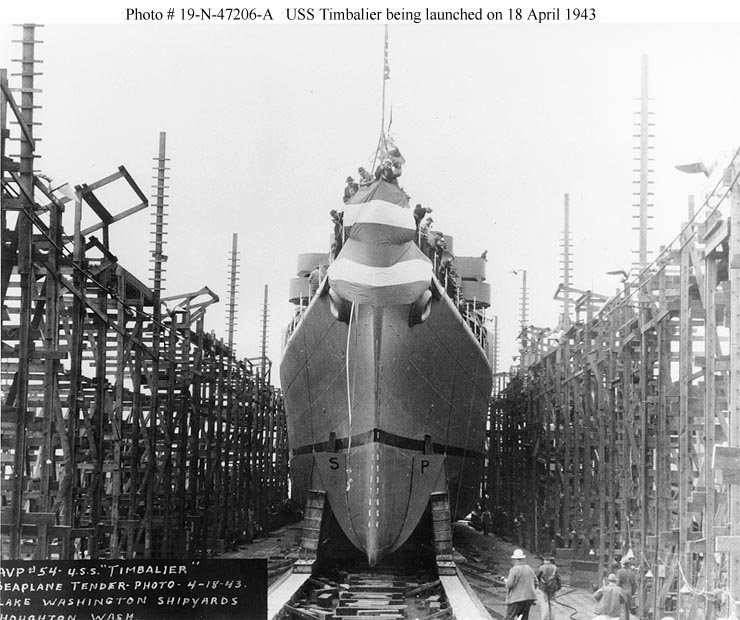
The launching of USS Timbalier on 18 April 1943.

Timbalier was built at the Lake Washington Shipyard, at Houghton, Washington, with her keel laid down on 9 November 1942. She was launched on 18 April 1943, sponsored by Mrs. S. B. Dunlap. Timbalier, and her sister USS Valcour (AVP-55), were initially ordered in February 1944 to be completed at the Puget Sound Navy Yard, but were transferred back to the Lake Washington Shipyard in June 1945. The resulting delay meant that she was not commissioned until 24 May 1946.

== US Navy career ==
Timbalier departed from Seattle, Washington on 20 June 1946, arriving at San Francisco, California, two days later on 22 June 1946. She transferred to Alameda, California, where she loaded stores and airplane spare parts before sailing for San Diego, California, on 26 June 1946. She underwent a period of sea trials off the United States West Coast, completing them on 27 July 1946. She then departed bound for Panama, transiting the Panama Canal on 3 August 1946. Timbalier then proceeded to the shipyards at New York City.

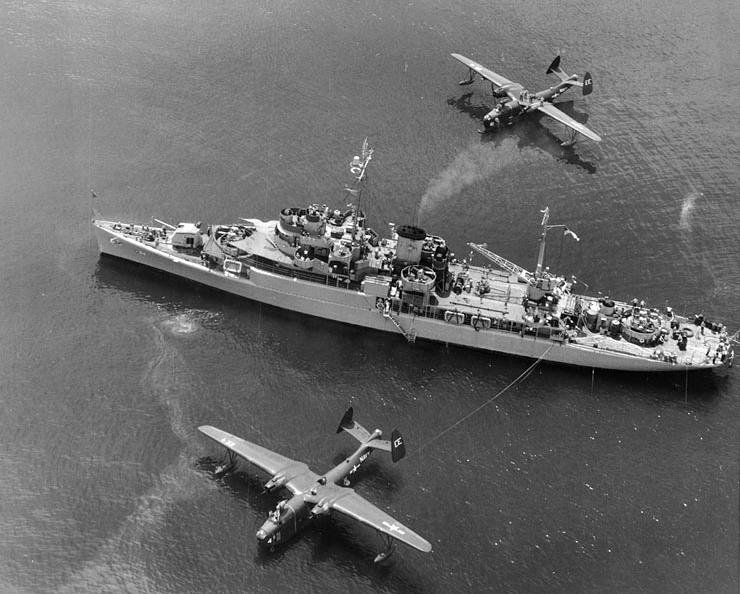
Timbalier with two Martin PBM Mariner flying boats shortly after World War II.

Timbalier was at the New York Naval Shipyard at Brooklyn, New York, until 8 November 1946, when she departed for Norfolk, Virginia, which she reached on 9 November 1946. She spent the rest of November 1946 in the vicinity of Hampton Roads, Virginia.

Timbalier departed Hampton Roads on 3 December 1946, bound for San Juan, Puerto Rico. She arrived there on 7 December 1946, beginning service with Fleet Air Wing 11 (FAW-11). She was based at Trinidad, and carried out operations in the Caribbean and off the United States East Coast. She served with FAW-11 as a tender for their Martin PBM Mariner flying boats for the rest of her naval career. With the increase in the Soviet submarine threat by 1951, the PBM Mariner squadrons deployed to carry out reconnaissance off the U.S. East Coast, and plans called for them to concentrate on convoy defense and antisubmarine warfare in the event of conflict with the Soviet Union, supported by Timbalier, her sister ship USS Duxbury Bay (AVP-38), and the seaplane tender USS Currituck (AV-7).

In 1952 Timbalier supported flying boat operations during Operation Mainbrace, a large-scale exercise of the North Atlantic Treaty Organization's navies, off the Scandinavian and Icelandic coasts. During Mainbrace, Timbalier tended flying boats operating from Lerwick in the Shetland Islands.

== Decommissioning, reserve, and disposal ==
Timbalier was decommissioned on 15 November 1954 and placed in the Atlantic Reserve Fleet. She was struck from the Navy List on 1 May 1960, and was sold on 20 December 1960 to Panagiotis Kokkinos, of Piraeus, Greece.

== Commercial service ==
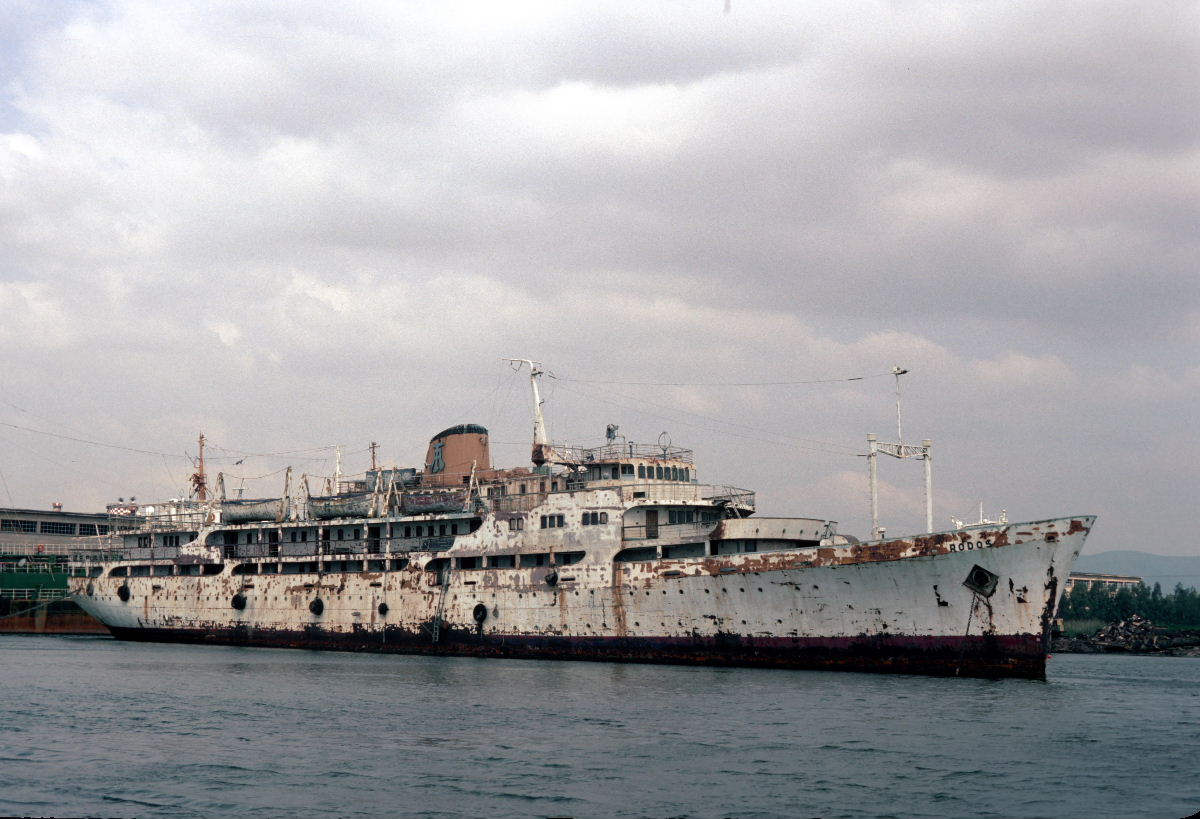
Cruise ship Ródos laid up in Eleusis on 16 July 1986

After her sale, Timbalier became the Greek cruise ship MV Ródos. She was scrapped at Eleusis, Greece, in 1989.
