= Timbalier Island =

Island in Louisiana, United States

Coordinates: 29°03′51″N 90°28′03″W

Timbalier Island is an island off southeastern Louisiana in the United States.

The island lies off the southeastern coast of Terrebonne Parish. Timbalier Bay lies between the island and the Louisiana mainland, and the island separates the bay from the Gulf of Mexico.

It borders Terrebonne Bay to its north and the Gulf of Mexico to its south. It is considered a barrier island essential in Louisiana to assist in the reduction of storm surges during hurricanes. It experiences more rapid land loss than the rest of Louisiana because of local tidal action.
