= Seaplane tender =

Boat that services aircraft landing on water

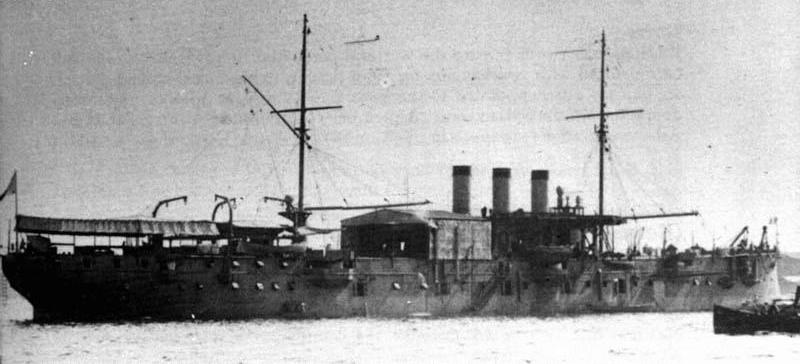
French seaplane carrier Foudre

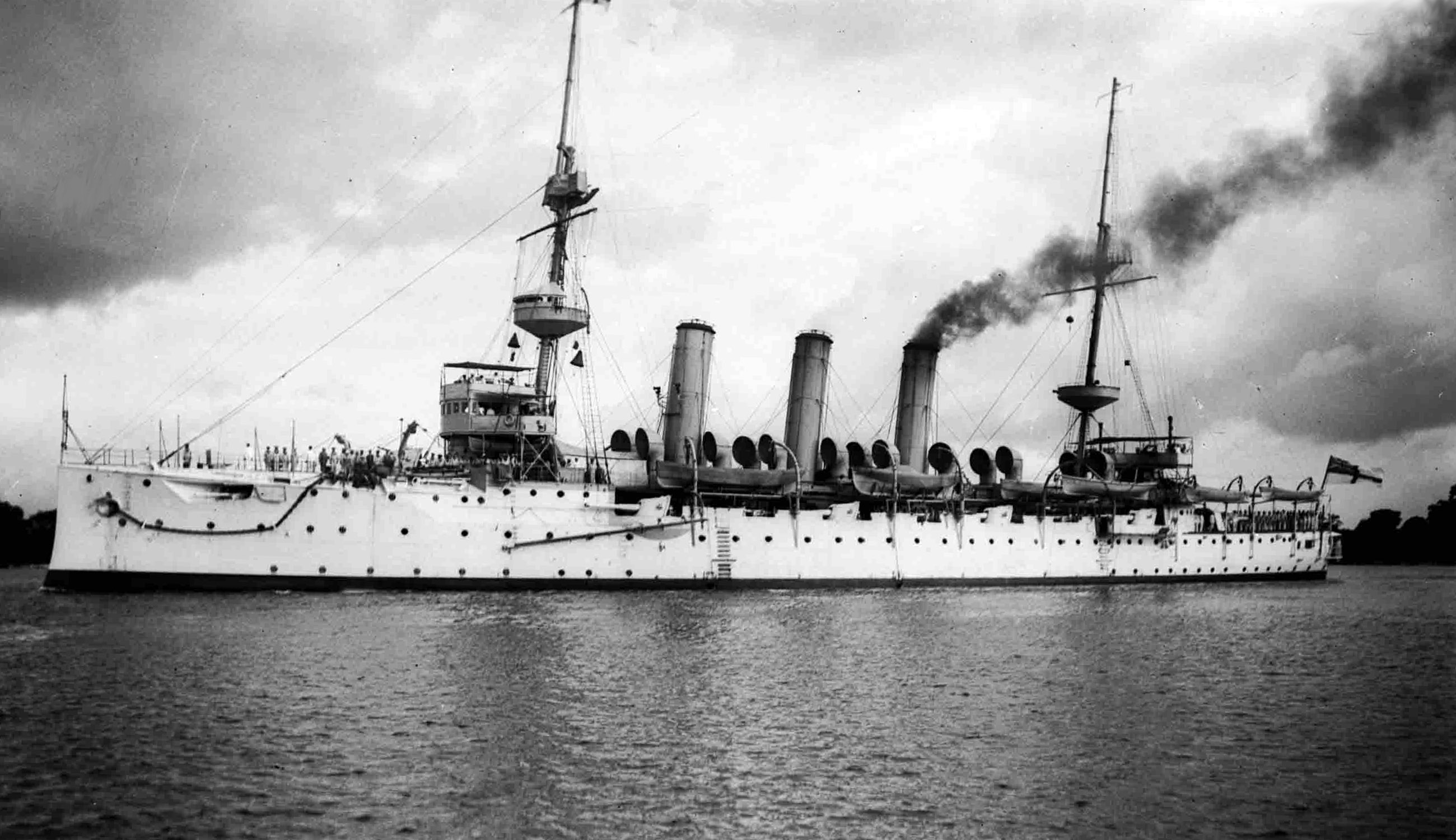
HMS Hermes, which functioned as a seaplane carrier for two months in 1913

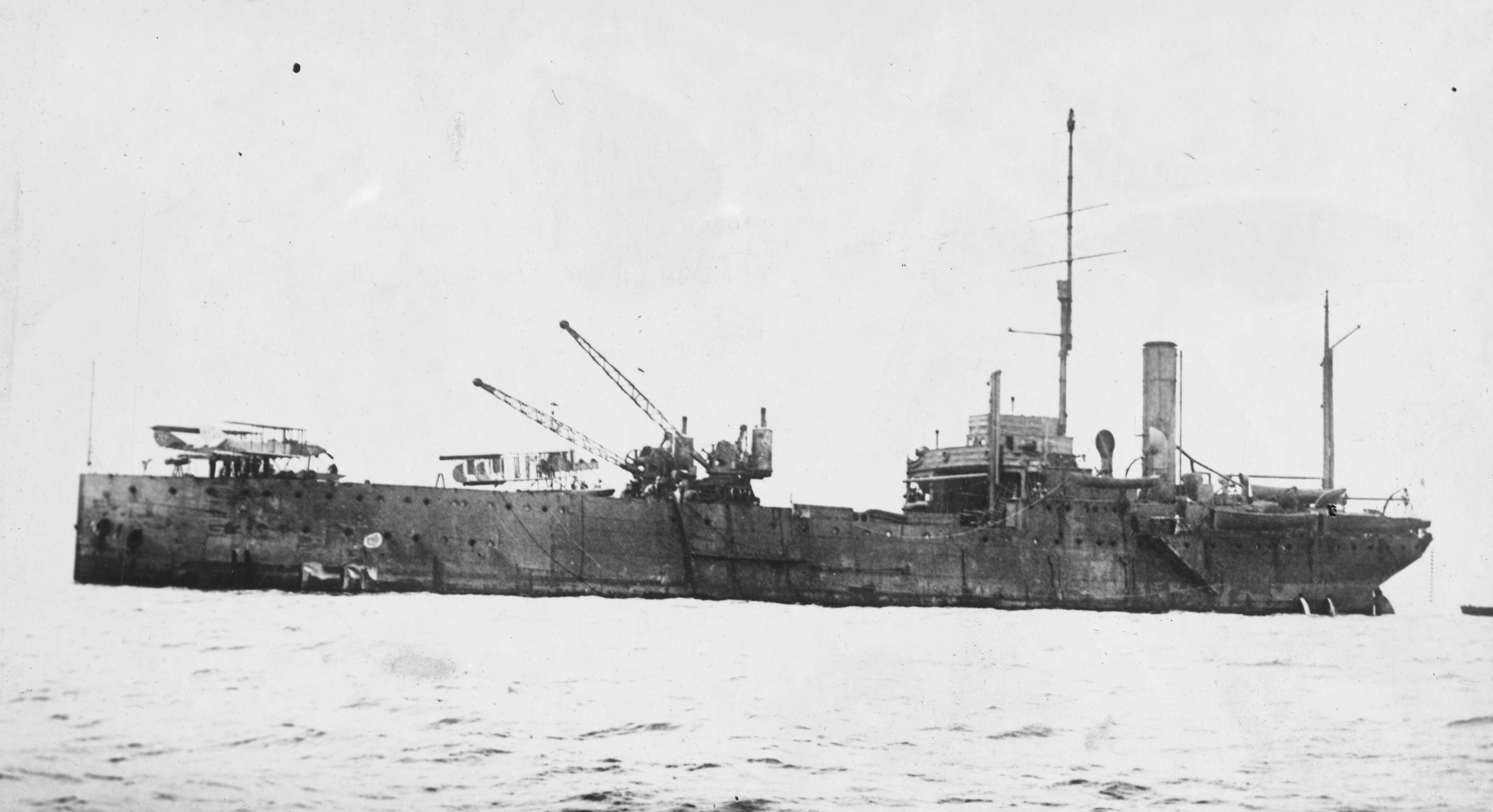
HMS Ark Royal about 1918

A seaplane tender is a boat or ship that supports the operation of seaplanes. Some of these vessels, known as seaplane carriers, could not only carry seaplanes but also provided all the facilities needed for their operation; these ships are regarded by some as the first aircraft carriers and appeared just before the First World War.

== Terminology ==
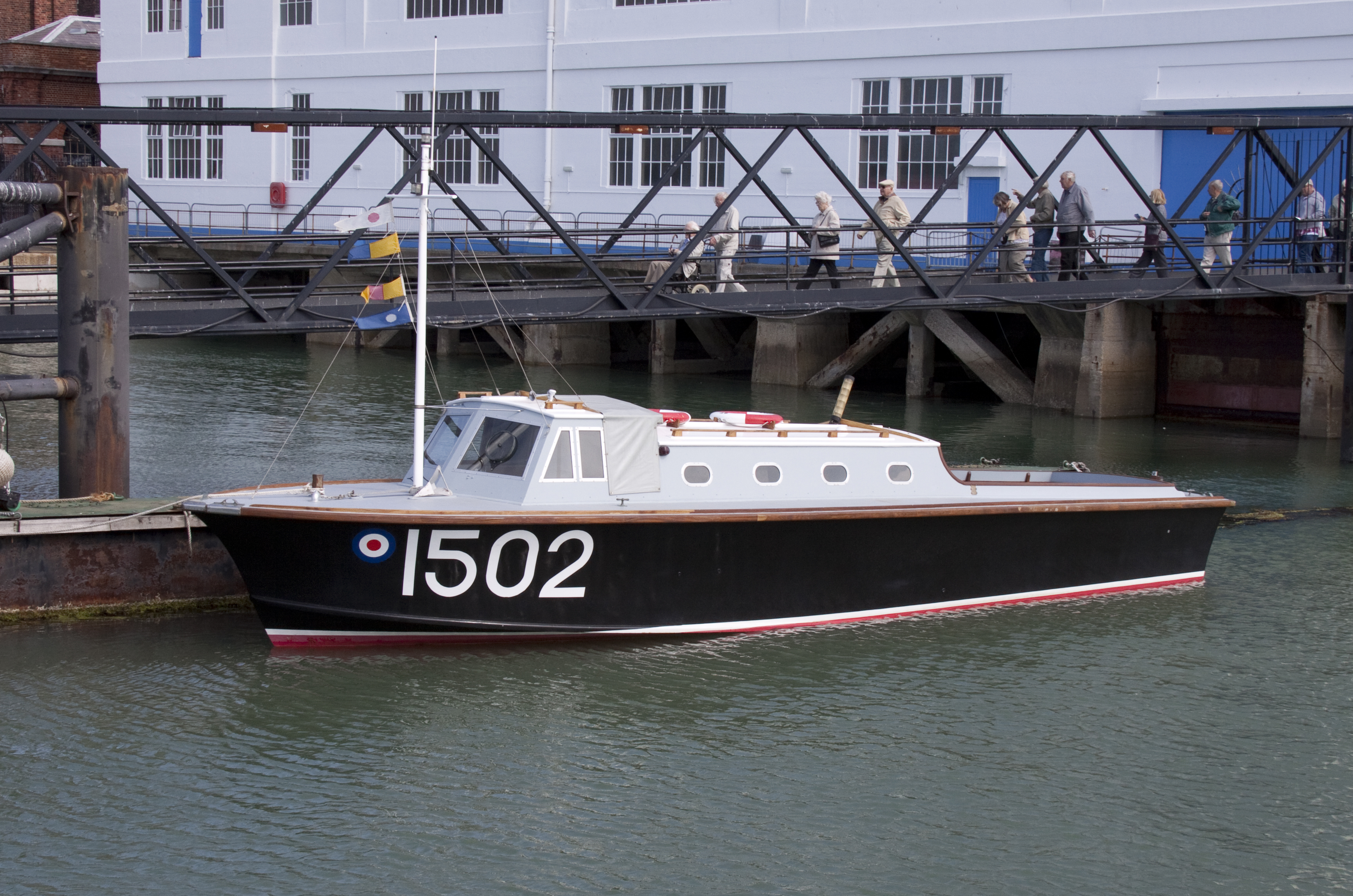
RAF seaplane tender 1502, in 2011

In maritime parlance a tender is a vessel that is used to support the operation of other vessels.

In British usage, the term tender was used for small craft, with the term depot ship being used for large seagoing vessels. Flying boats and float planes even when based at home in ports and harbour had a need for small support vessels to operate.

British tenders were small craft of launch to pinnace size. These were used to ferry crews, stores and supplies between shore and the aircraft, to maintain the buoys used to mark out "taxiways" and "runways" and to keep these clear of debris to prevent foreign object damage, and in the case of emergency to act as rescue craft and airport crash tenders. All those functions that on land would require wheeled ground support equipment had a need for a watercraft equivalent.

When deploying flying boat squadrons, bases could rapidly be established in areas lacking infrastructure by sending flying boat depot ships in addition to small craft tenders. These ships could carry out the function of barracks, workshops and control towers, i.e. those functions which in a land based airfield would be fulfilled by buildings.

== History ==
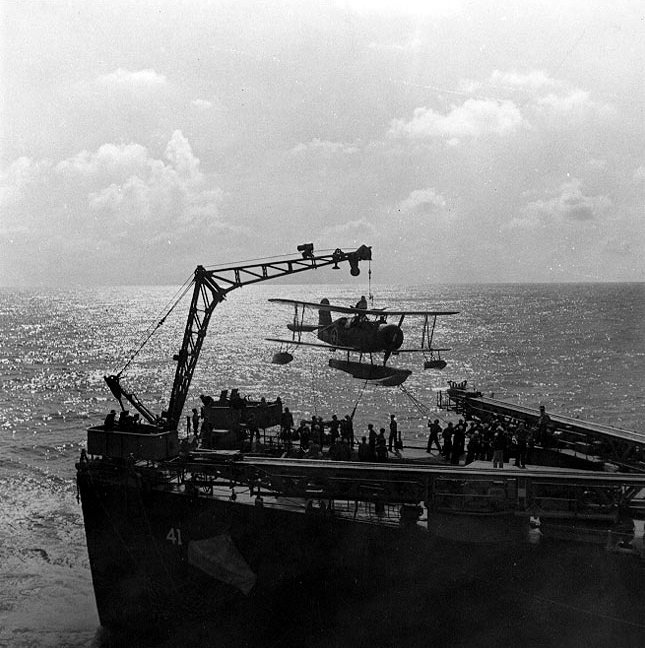
Scoutplane being hoisted on board USS Philadelphia

The first seaplane carrier appeared in 1911 with the French Navy La Foudre, following the invention of the seaplane in 1910 with the French Fabre Hydravion. La Foudre carried float-equipped planes under hangars on the main deck, from where they were lowered on the sea with a crane. La Foudre was further modified in November 1913 with a 10 m (32 ft 10 in)-long flat deck to launch her seaplanes. Another early seaplane carrier was HMS Hermes, an old cruiser converted and commissioned with a flying-off deck in mid-1913. However, HMS Ark Royal was the first ship in history designed and built as a seaplane carrier in 1914.

=== First World War ===
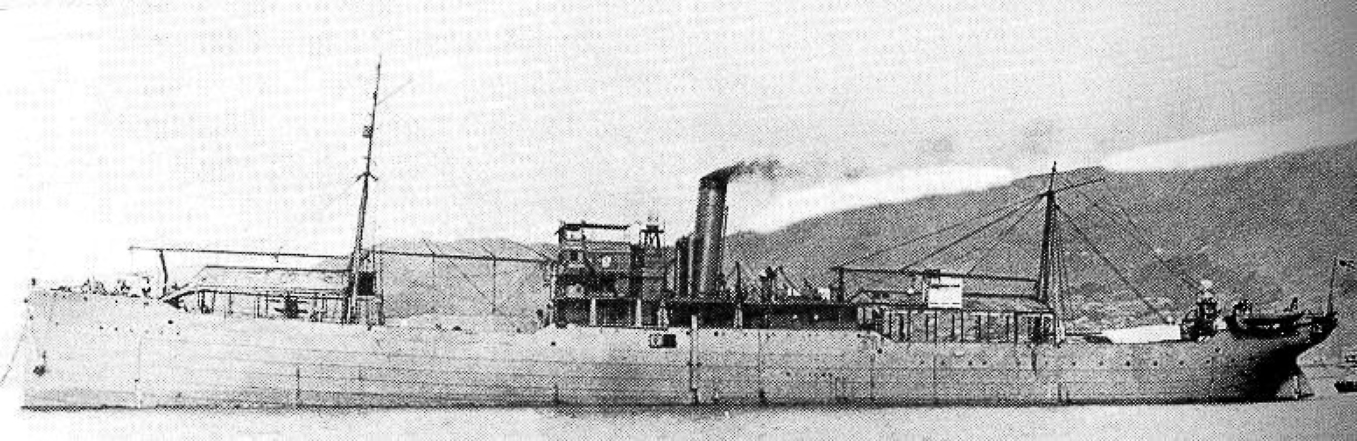
The Japanese seaplane carrier Wakamiya conducted the world's first naval-launched air raids in September 1914.

In the Battle of Tsingtao, from 5 September 1914, the Imperial Japanese Navy seaplane carrier Wakamiya conducted the world's first naval-launched air raids from Kiaochow Bay. The four Maurice Farman seaplanes bombarded German-held land targets (communication centers and command centers) and damaged a German minelayer in the Tsingtao peninsula from September 1914 until that November, when the Germans surrendered.

On Christmas Day 1914, the British carried out the Cuxhaven Raid; seaplanes carried within range of their targets attacked German naval targets in the Heligoland Bight.

These carriers had hangars for storing and maintaining the aircraft, but no flight deck as in a true aircraft carrier. Instead, they used cranes to lower the aircraft into the sea for takeoff and to recover them after landing. The ships were normally converted merchant vessels rather than specially constructed for the task. As aircraft improved, the problems of using seaplanes became more of a handicap. The aircraft could only be operated in a smooth sea and the ship had to stop for launching or recovery, both of which took around 20 minutes. The tender was often stationed 10 mi (8.7 nmi; 16 km) or so in front of the main battle fleet with the cruiser screen so that it would not fall significantly behind when it launched its aircraft. Seaplanes also had poorer performance than other aircraft because of the drag and weight of the floats. Seaplane tenders had largely been superseded by aircraft carriers in the battle fleet by the end of the First World War, although aircraft were still of minor importance compared to the firepower of naval artillery.

The British HMS Ark Royal was a seaplane tender with a flying-off deck. Seaplanes could be recovered while the ship was under way through the "Hein Mat" – a sheet towed behind the vessel, once the aircraft was on the mat it was effectively stationary with respect to the ship and could be hoisted aboard.

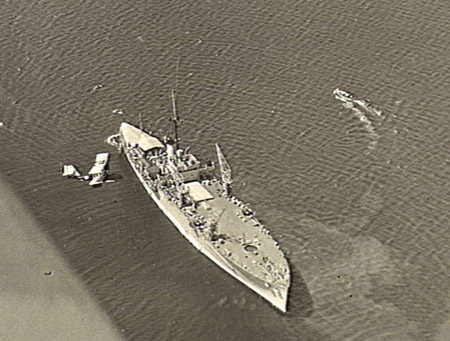
The Australian seaplane tender HMAS Albatross with one of her aircraft overhead (AWM 300122)

In the inter-war years, it was common for cruisers and battleships to be equipped with catapult-launched reconnaissance seaplanes. A few navies – especially those without true aircraft carriers – also acquired catapult-equipped seaplane carriers for fleet reconnaissance.

=== World War II ===
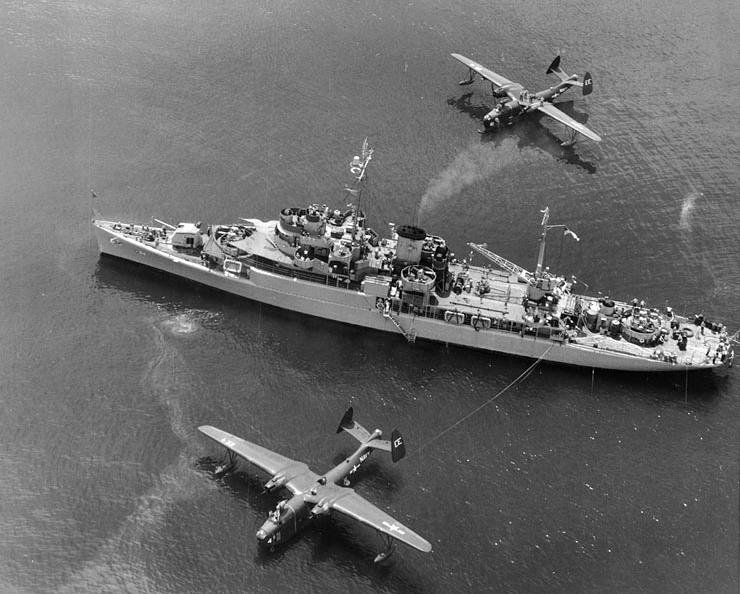
USS Timbalier with two Martin PBM Mariner flying boats shortly after the Second World War

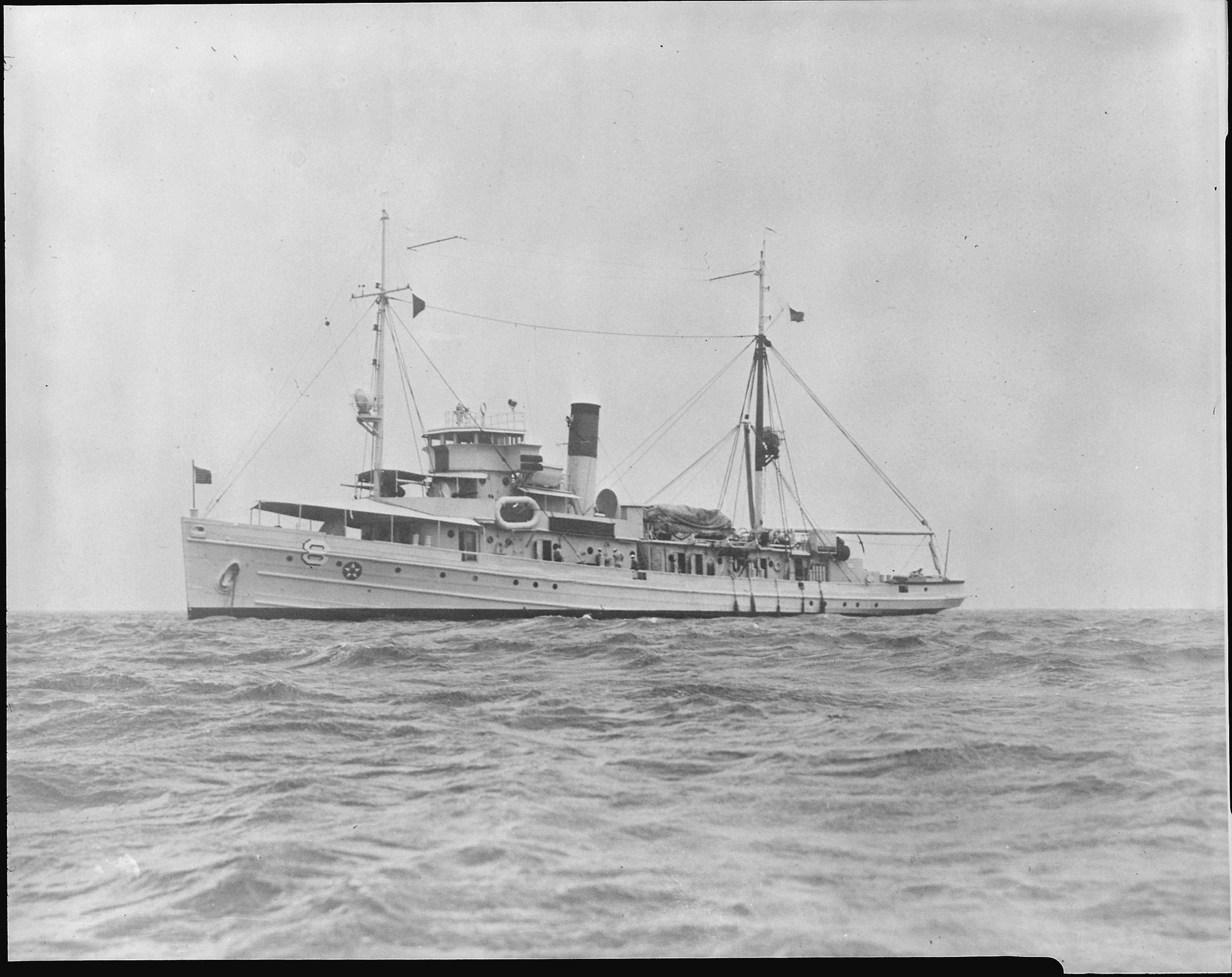
USS Gannet (AM-41)

During the Second World War, both the American and the Japanese Navies built a number of seaplane tenders to supplement their aircraft carrier fleets. However, these ships often had their catapults removed, and were used as support vessels that operated seaplanes from harbours rather than in a seaway. These aircraft were generally for long-range reconnaissance patrols. The tenders allowed the aircraft to be rapidly deployed to new bases because their runways did not have to be constructed, and support facilities were mobile much like supply ships for submarines or destroyers.

Nazi Germany's Kriegsmarine, in the Second World War, did not operate any seaplane tenders. However, the Luftwaffe had nineteen seaplane tenders. These ships were mostly converted from existing civilian seaplane tenders, and were capable of carrying 1–3 seaplanes. The French and Italian Navies also had seaplane tenders.

Seaplane carriers became obsolete at the end of the Second World War. A few remained in service after the war but by the late 1950s most had been scrapped or converted to other uses such as helicopter repair ships.

== List of examples ==
Examples of seaplane tenders include:

- HMAS Albatross (Australia, 1928)
- Akitsushima (Japan, served from 1942 until sunken in 1944)
- La Foudre (France, converted into the world's first seaplane tender in 1911–13)
- Chitose (Japan, 1936; she and sister ship Chiyoda converted to conventional aircraft carriers in 1943–1944)
- Commandant Teste (France, 1932)
- Giuseppe Miraglia (Italy, converted from merchant vessel Citta de Messina in 1927)
- Dédalo (Spain, converted from the German merchant vessel Neuenfels in 1922)
- HMS Ark Royal (UK, 1914, renamed Pegasus in 1934)
- HMS Ben-my-Chree (UK, a ferry converted in 1915 used in WWI)
- HMS Engadine (UK, 1911, another converted ferry; present at the Battle of Jutland)
- HMS Campania (UK)
- HMS Riviera (UK, sister ship of Engadine)
- USS Langley (USA's first aircraft carrier; converted into a seaplane tender in 1937)
- USS Mississippi (USA, a battleship used as a seaplane tender in 1914)
- USS Curtiss (USA WWII Pearl Harbor to Okinawa)
- USS Currituck and USS Pine Island (USA WWII-era seaplane tenders, both later participated in Operation Highjump, a 1947 mission to Antarctica)
- USS Norton Sound (Began service as Currituck-class seaplane tender AV-11, later converted to AVM-1 – first US guided-missile ship)
- HMAFV Adastral, ex HMS Fife Ness, a Fort ship, converted to a seaplane depot ship, and operated by the RAF between 1947 and 1953
- USS Tangier (USA, a C3 cargo ship converted to a seaplane tender in 1940) Present at Pearl Harbor Attack December 7, 1941
- USS Timbalier (tended Martin PBM Mariner flying boats until 1954)

== See also ==
- List of aircraft carriers of World War II
- List of auxiliaries of the United States Navy § Destroyer Seaplane Tenders (AVD)
- List of auxiliaries of the United States Navy § Seaplane Tenders (AV)
- List of auxiliaries of the United States Navy § Small Seaplane Tenders (AVP)
- List of seaplane bases in the United Kingdom
- List of seaplane operators
- List of ships of World War II
- Type C3-class ship
