= Coupe Deutsch de la Meurthe =

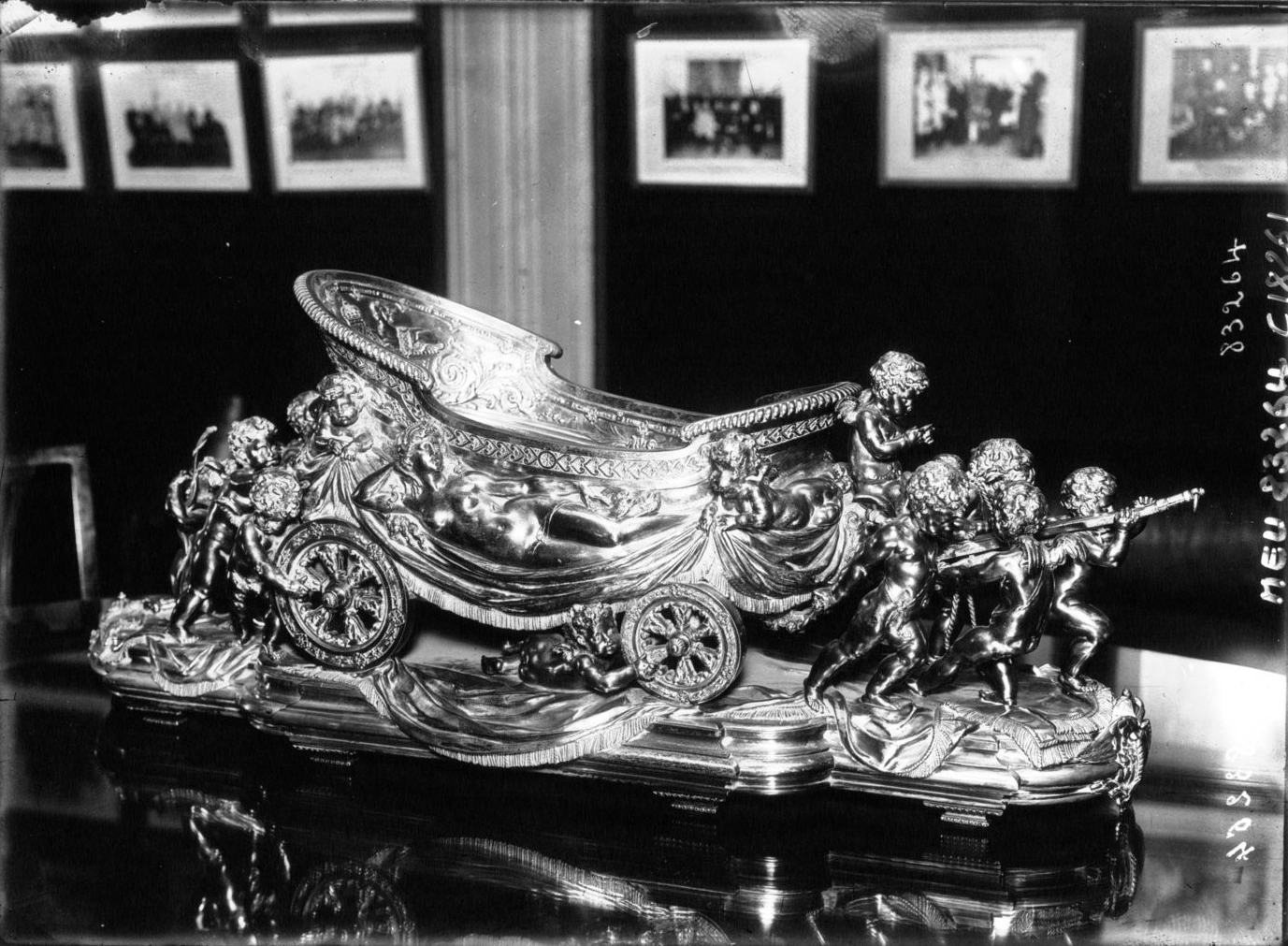
- Awarded for: Fastest time over a measured distance (time trial)
- Country: International
- Presented by: Aéro-Club de France
- First award: 1909
- Final award: 1936

The Coupe Deutsch de la Meurthe was an international aeronautical speed competition instituted on 25 August 1909 by the French oil magnate Henry Deutsch de la Meurthe. The race was reinstated three times through the years at the initiative of the Aéro-Club de France, and later by Deutsch de la Meurthe's daughter Suzanne.

== First Coupe Deutsch de la Meurthe ==
Announced in 1906, the first Deutsch de la Meurthe competition was a speed trial intended for all powered aircraft over a distance of 200 kilometres, to be flown as an outward leg of 100 km followed by a return to the starting point. The flight had to be made between 1 March and 31 October, and the performance was recognized only if the previous best performance was surpassed by at least 10%. A bonus of 20,000 francs was awarded each year for the best performance that had remained unsurpassed for eight months. The Coupe (cup), an objet d'art valued at 10,000 francs, was to be given to the first aircraft builder who won three consecutive competitions.

=== 1912 competition ===
Despite the substantial prize being offered, it took six years to attract participants. On 12 April 1912, Maurice Tabuteau piloting a 50 hp Gnome-powered Morane-Saulnier monoplane flew the circuit in 1 h 47 min 48 s, despite persistent navigation problems caused by fog. On 1 May 1912 Parisian Emmanuel Hélen completed the course at 119.532 km/h (74.274 mph) flying a 70 hp Gnome-powered Nieuport monoplane. Since no other pilot bettered this performance by more than 10% before 31 October 1912, Hélen became the first holder of the Coupe.

=== 1913 competition ===
On 27 October 1913 Eugène Gilbert gained first place in the second competition for the Coupe, covering the course at an average speed of 154.38 km/h (95.93 mph) in a 160 h.p. Gnome-powered Deperdussin Monocoque.

=== 1919/1920 competition ===
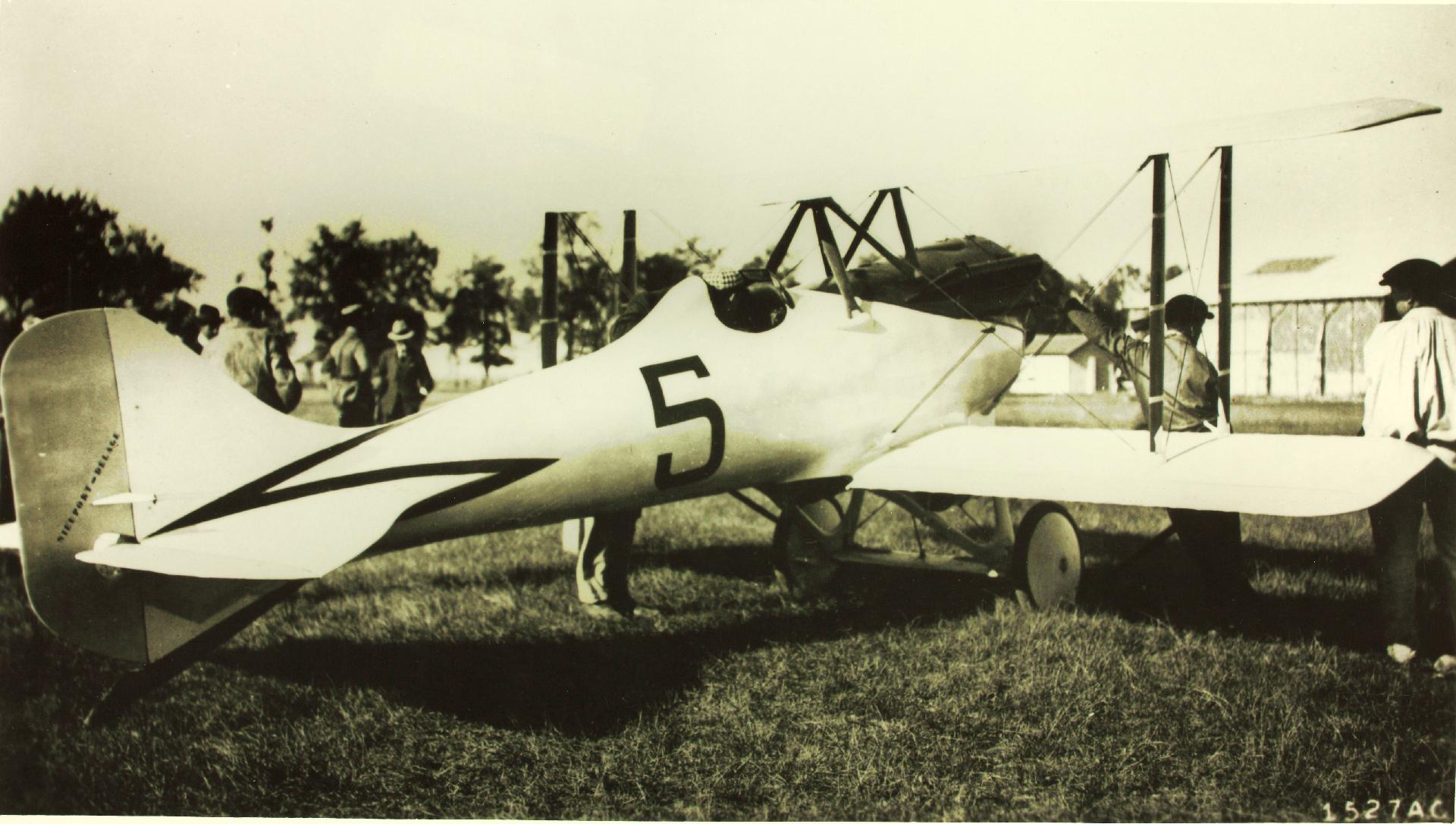
Nieuport-Delage NiD.29V racer

The competition was interrupted by the First World War, but on 13 October 1919 it resumed using the same course, but the competition was now open for the entire year, and the trophy would be definitely kept by the first participant whose time remained unbeaten for eight consecutive months. Four aeroplanes participated in this trial: a 180 hp Hispano-Suiza-powered Gourdou-Leseurre monoplane piloted by Rost, a 300 hp Hispano-Suiza-powered SPAD-Herbemont piloted by Joseph Sadi-Lecointe, a 300 hp Hispano-Suiza-powered Nieuport biplane piloted by Bernard Barny de Romanet, and a 180 hp Le Rhöne-powered Nieuport monoplane designed by engineer Mary, and flown by the Danish pilot Leth Jensen. Taking off on 13 October 1919, Jensen flew the circuit at an average speed of 200.001 km/h (57 minutes). The next day, Rost reached an average speed of 210 km/h while de Romanet had an aircraft failure. On 15 October, Sadi-Lecointe flew a first circuit at 223 km/h, and then a second lap at 246.9 km/h and thus became the title holder. On 21 October 1919, de Romanet reached an average speed of 268.631 km/h which was insufficient to be homologated, because this performance was less than 110% of Sadi-Lecointe's performance. He followed it the next day with an average speed of 285.600km/h which did count. Bad weather then stopped the competition, which was resumed just three months later. On 3 January 1920, Sadi-Lecointe, who had in the meanwhile had left Blériot-SPAD for Nieuport, reached 266.314 km/h (165.480 mph) with a Hispano-engined Nieuport-Delage NiD 29V. On 3 August 1920, he became the holder of the Coupe Deutsch de la Meurthe, his performance having remained unbeaten.

== Second Coupe Deutsch de la Meurthe ==
In 1920, following the ending of the Gordon Bennett Trophy competition due to a third consecutive French victory, the Aéro-Club de France decided to organize a new competition to replace it. This was named Coupe Deutsch de la Meurthe to honour Henry Deutsch de la Meurthe, who had died on 24 November 1919; the competition was funded by his family.

It remained a speed competition, but was now to be held on a given date. The competition was to be held as 3 laps of a 100km (62mi) circuit, with its start at Étampes and a turn made at la Marmogne farm at Gidy. The competition was open for three years and was international, with each country allowed three entrants. A sum of 60,000 francs was to be awarded each year for the best performance, and a cup valued at 20,000 francs given to the winner. In the case of the cup being won outright before the end of the competition, the winner would also receive the remaining prize money.

=== 1921 competition ===
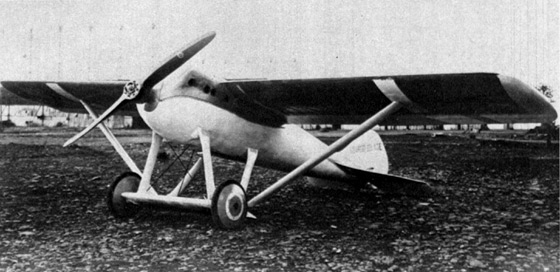
Nieuport NiD.41 Sesquiplan

There were seven participants in this race, which was held on 1 October. No eliminating heats were needed to select from the five French pilot entrants, since Count Bernard de Romanet died when the wing fabric of his Lumière-De Monge monoplane (Note: The aircraft could be configured as either a biplane or a monoplane.) detached at high speed during the elimination trials on 23 September, and at the last moment Hanriot withdrew their entrant, the Hanriot HD.22. This was a metal monoplane with retractable landing gear expressly built for the race, and which had been intended to be piloted by Rost. Nieuport entered two Nieuport NiD.29Vs piloted by Sadi-Lecointe and Ferdinand Lasne, and a NiD.41 Sesquiplan was entrusted to Georges Kirsch. A 700hp Fiat-powered Fiat biplane piloted by Francesco Brack Papa represented Italy, and British pilot Herbert James flew a 450hp Napier Lion-powered Gloster Mars I (G-EAXZ).

A broken propeller forced Sadi-Lecointe to make a forced landing in a beet field at Cernonville, injuring an eye and both legs in the process. The wing fabric of James' aeroplane was torn away, and he had to make a forced landing. Brach Papa established a new Italian speed record, but the engine exploded before the finish line. Thus, only two Nieuport pilots were left to finish the race, Georges Kirsch winning with a speed of 282.75km/h (a new world speed record for a distance of 300km); Fernand Lasne's speed was 259.03km/h.

=== 1922 competition ===
The 1921 circuit remained unchanged for the 1922 competition, which was held on 30 September. Nieuport-Astra (Note: Nieuport having taken over the Société Astra by this point) entered a Nieuport NiD.29V piloted by Lasne and the sesquiplane piloted by Sadi-Lecointe, Jean Casale was piloting a Blériot-SPAD S.58, a design based on the S.41 fighter. Fiat and Gloster were presenting the same machines and pilots as the preceding year. Assigned to their factory pilot Berthelin, who was new to this competition, the NiD.41 was retired at the last moment. The tailless Simplex aircraft which was supposed to be piloted by Georges Madon had an accident during its tests, and Charles Nungesser was absent.

In his Nieuport sesquiplane named Eugène Gilbert (race number 5), Sadi-Lecointe covered the first 100km at an average speed of 325km/h (a new closed circuit speed record), but a spark plug popped out of its cylinder and passed through the engine cowling as he was turning around the airport pylon. The pilot was therefore forced to land, and the airplane hit a gutter which turned the aircraft on its back without injuring the pilot. James lost his maps during his flight and unable to find the turning point returned to the start. Jean Casale's SPAD S.58 Louis Blériot (race no.3) was victim of a radiator leak, and made a forced landing at Étampes and was unable to finish the race, as was also the case for Brack-Papa's Fiat R.700 which had a fuel pump failure. The first lap made by the Italian pilot at 288km/h (179mph) was not homologated since the aircraft had flown behind the time-keepers at the starting point, but he was offered a second attempt. Brack-Papa started a second time but retired when he realized he would not be able to beat Lasne, who won the competition with an average speed of 289.90km/h.

== Third Coupe Deutsch de la Meurthe ==
In 1931 Suzanne Deutsch de la Meurthe initiated a new competition for the Coupe, which was contested for the first time on 29 May 1933. The trial was to be run in two 1,000km stages separated by a 90 minutes refuelling stop, and was limited to aircraft with an engine capacity of less than eight litres. The starting point of the race was still at the aerodrome at Étampes. Suzanne Deutsch de la Meurthe was offering one million Francs, and the Ministère de l'Air (Air Ministry) offered another three million in prize money.

=== 1933 competition ===
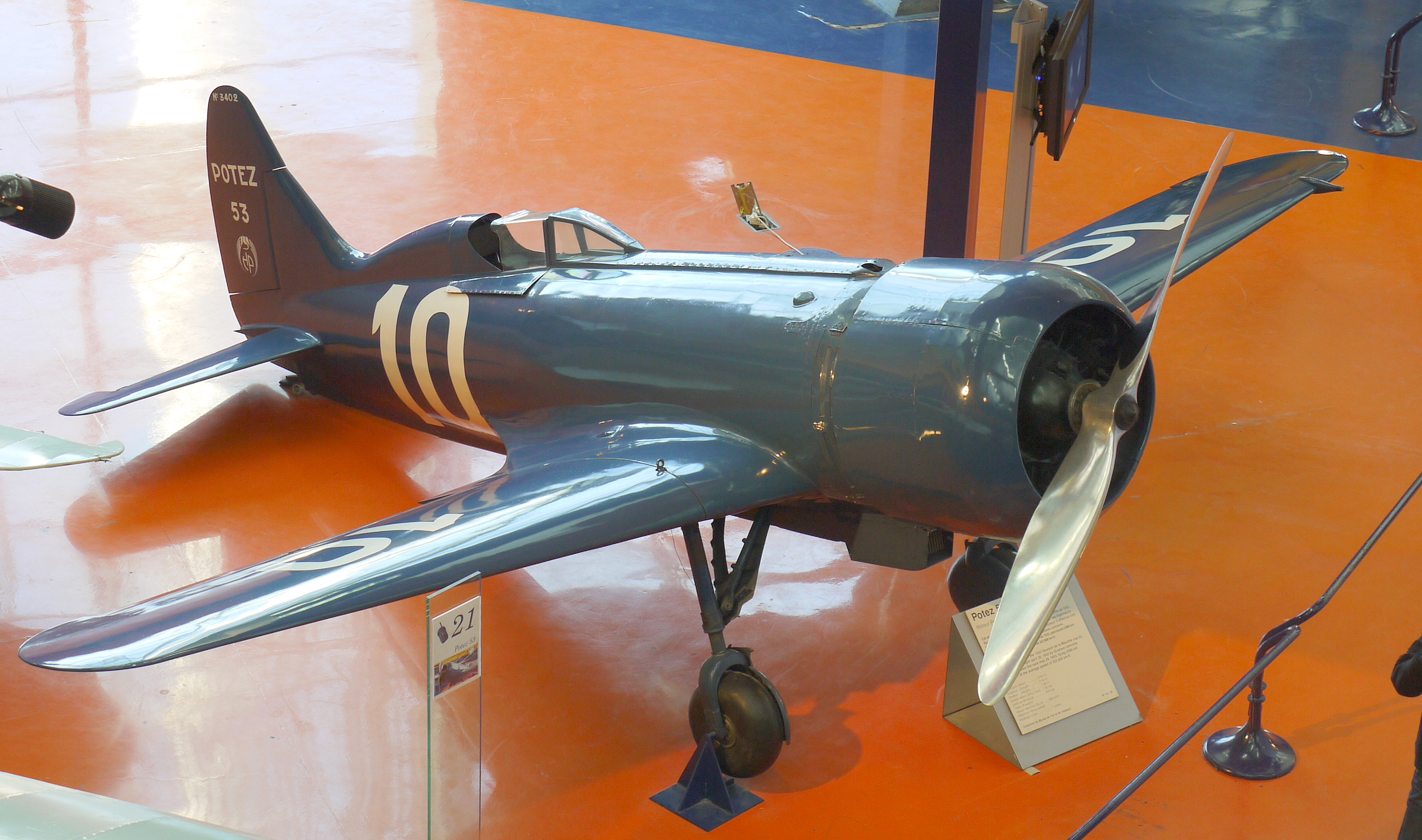
A Potez 53

On 24 May 1933 Captain Ludovic Arrachart was killed when his Caudron C.360 (race no.11) crashed due to engine failure at Maisons near Chartres while he was training for the competition. The event was won by Georges Détré flying a Potez 53 powered by a Potez 9B radial engine developing barely 310hp at full power at a speed of 322.81 kilometres per hour (200.58 mph), beating Raymond Delmotte's Caudron C.362 (race no.6) with a speed of 291.12 kilometres per hour (180.89 mph), and also beating the only foreign competitor, Nick Comper flying Comper Swift G-ABWW 239.58 kilometres per hour (148.87 mph). A third French competitor, test pilot Lemoine also flying a Potez 53, was forced to abandon the race.

=== 1934 competition ===
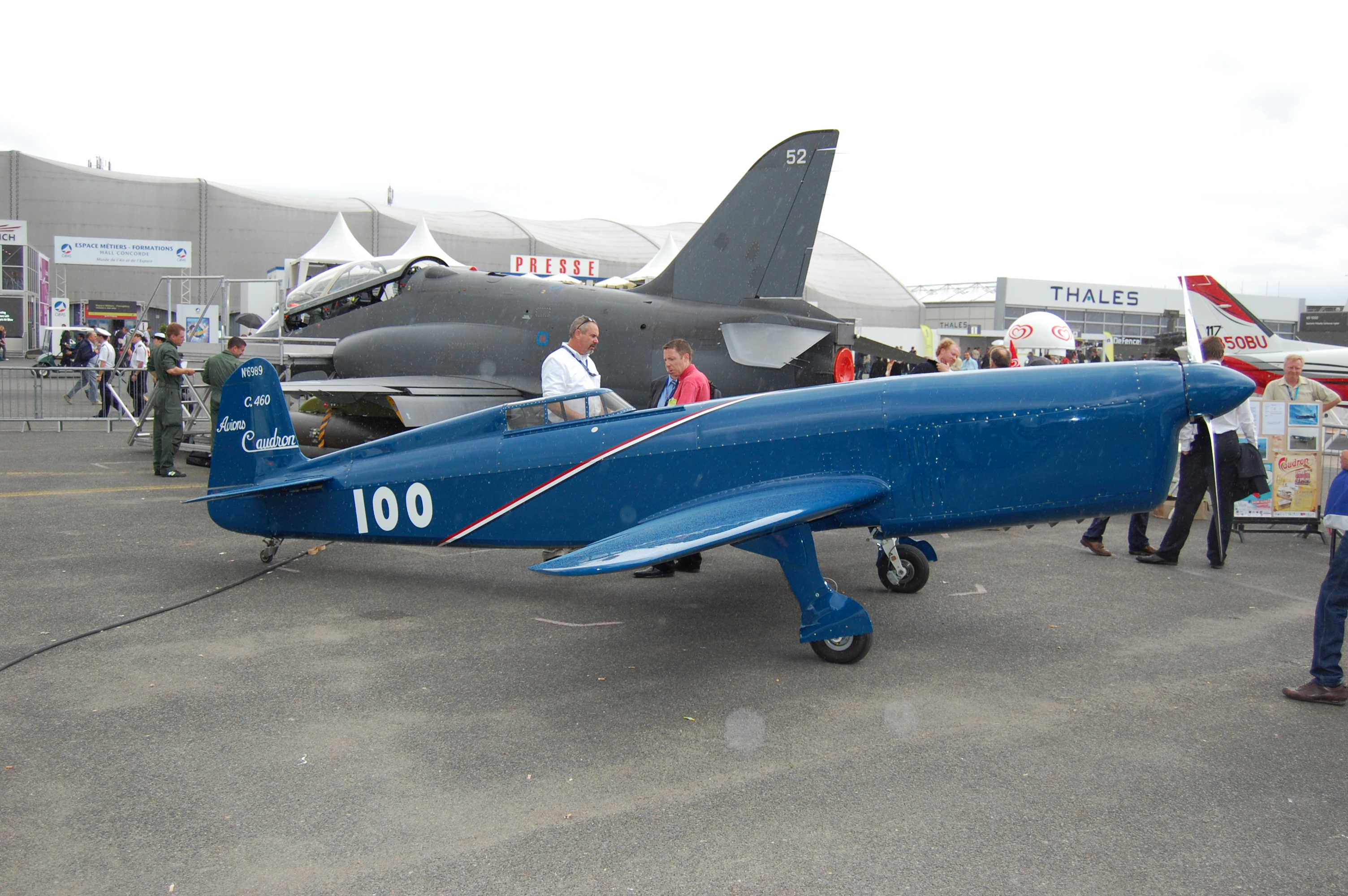
A Caudron C.460 replica

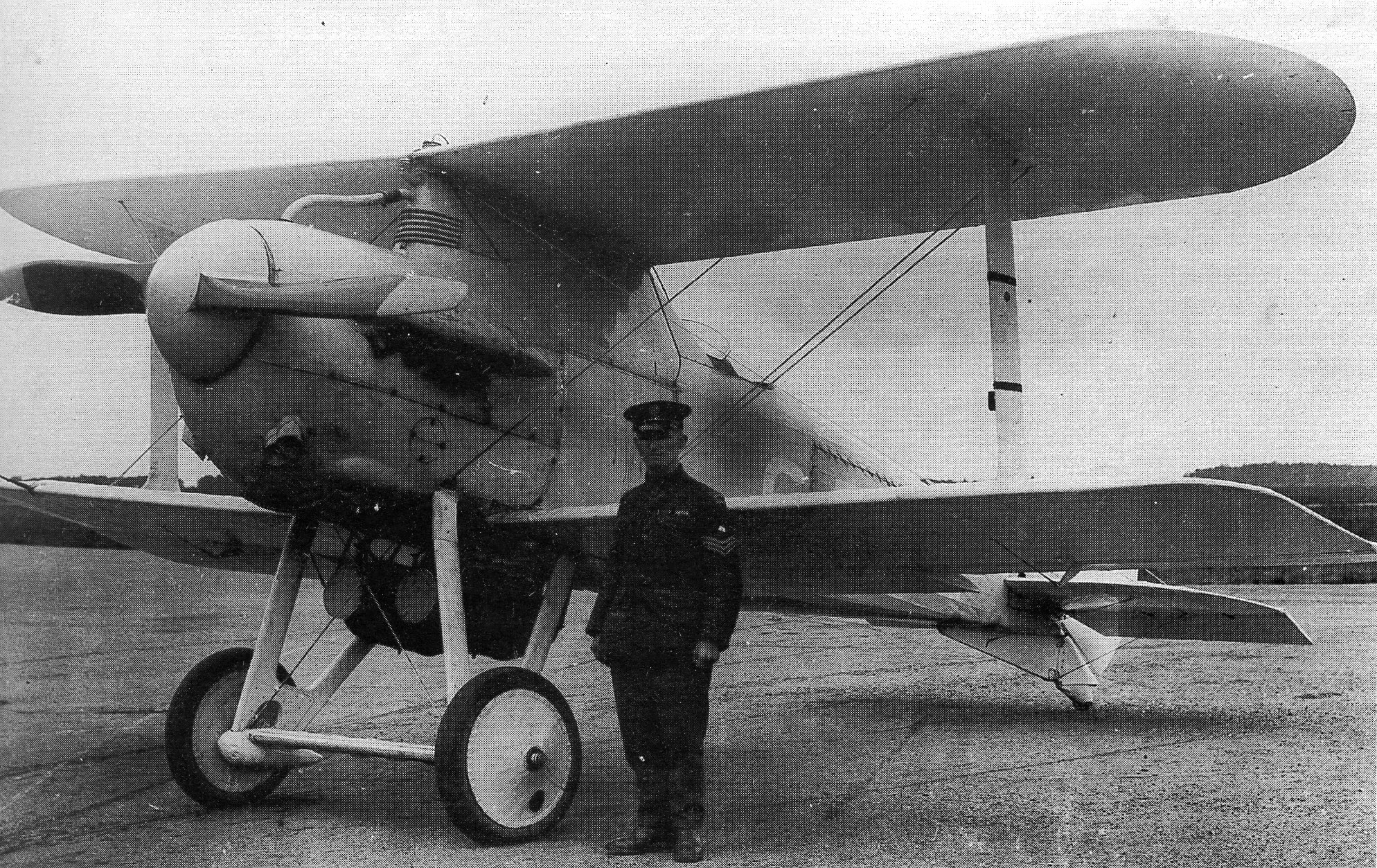
Gloster Mars I (G-EAXZ)

On 27 May 1934, the race was a duel between the Caudron pilots, the Caudron firm presenting two racing aircraft designed by Marcel Riffard. Maurice Arnoux won with a C.450 at a speed of 388.97km/h overtaking Louis Massotte's Regnier-engined (and sponsored) C.366 (360.72km/h) and Albert Monville's Renault-engined Caudron C.460 (341.04km/h). Nick Comper flew the Comper Streak (G-ACNC), but retired on the 6th lap of the afternoon session as problem with the undercarriage limited his speed. Georges Detre flying a Potez 53-2 retired after problems with his engine oil supply. The Potez 53-3 had problems with its variable pitch propeller and was unable to start for the second section,

=== 1935 competition ===
The 1935 race was arguably the most exciting competition of them all, and was the consecration of the Caudron-Renault racers. Eight pilots were registered for this event, but the Nennig C-3 (race no.4) of Guy Bart was not ready, and the Régnier Martinet, a modified Caudron C.366, (race no.2) was damaged during its tests. Two Caudron C.560s were supposed to participate (race no.1 and 3), but were not ready. They were thus replaced by a Caudron C.430 and a C.450 with the same race numbers.

The course was over 100 km (62 miles), from Etampes aerodrome to Chartres Bonce and back. The race itself was in two stages, each of 1,000 km (625 miles).

Charles Franco was the first to take off in Caudron C.430 (race no.1), but abandoned the race on the fourth lap as he was clearly out-classed by the other aircraft. It was followed by the Caudron C.460s of Yves Lacombe (race no.5), Raymond Delmotte (Caudron's chief pilot) (race no.8 ), and Maurice Arnoux (race no.6) respectively, this last entrant having to quit the race after seven laps, having run out of oil after a high-speed lap at 469 km/h (291 mph). Albert Monville's Caudron C.450 (race no.3) was the last to take off. Only three aircraft qualified for the second part of the race, which was held during rain showers. Raymond Delmotte won, ahead of Yves Lacombe and Maurice Arnoux, flying the aircraft previously flown by Albert Monville .

== Fourth Coupe Deutsch de la Meurthe ==
On 13 September 1936, a last competition was organized, in which only Caudrons were entered; two Caudron C.461s, one Caudron C.450 and two Caudron C.560s. Of these, only three planes raced. Yves Lacombe won with a speed of 389.462 km/h (242.000 mph), beating Maurice Arnoux timed at 369.59 km/h (229.65 mph).

== See also ==
- List of aviation awards
