= Aéro-Club de France =

French aviators' association

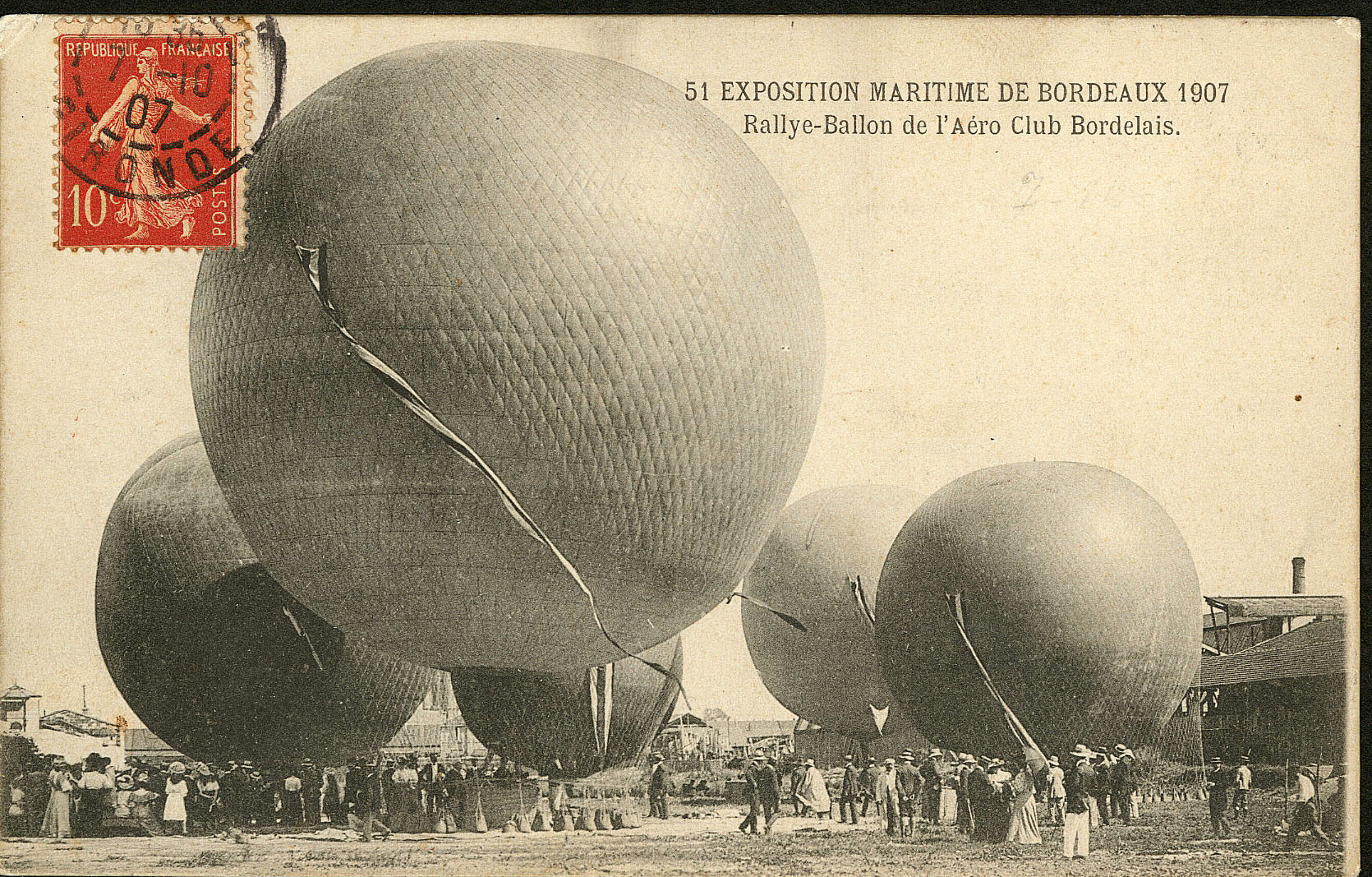
The Aéro-Club de France at the Exposition maritime internationale de 1907.

The Aéro-Club de France (French: [a.e.ʁɔ.klyb də fʁɑ̃s]) is one of the oldest French aeronautical associations still active. It was founded as the Aéro-Club on 20 October 1898 as a society 'to encourage aerial locomotion' by Ernest Archdeacon, Léon Serpollet, Henri de la Valette, Jules Verne and his wife, André Michelin, Albert de Dion, Alberto Santos-Dumont, Henri Deutsch de la Meurthe, and Henry de La Vaulx. On 20 April 1909, its name was changed to Aéro-Club de France.

The Aéro-Club de France originally set many of the regulations that controlled aviation in France. From its formation it also set the rules that have marked some of the 'firsts' in aviation, such as the first closed-circuit flight of over 1 km and the first helicopter flight, and has organised competitions including:

- the Prix Deutsch de la Meurthe, a challenge for dirigibles from 1901
- the Gordon Bennett Cup for fixed-wing aircraft in 1909

The club published the journal L'Aérophile from 1898 to 1947, and since 1997 publishes the magazine Aérofrance.

The Aéro-Club de France was a founding member of the International Aeronautical Federation (FAI) in 1905, a joint effort with other national associations.

After 1945, some of the Aéro-Club's regulatory roles were taken by other bodies. It now focusses on the promotion of aviation and certification.

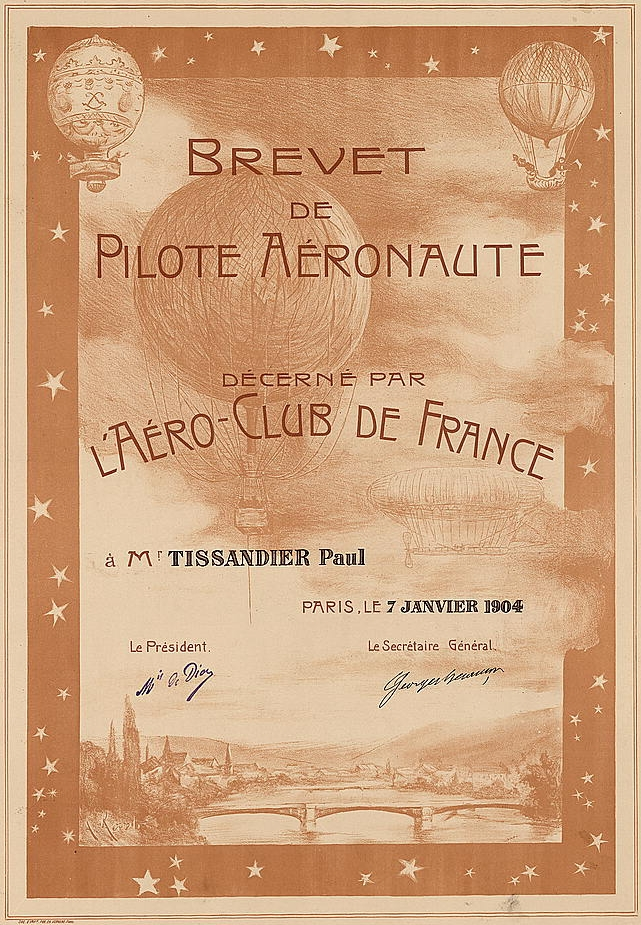
Balloon pilot's licence issued by the Aéro-Club de France to Mr. Tissandier in 1904.

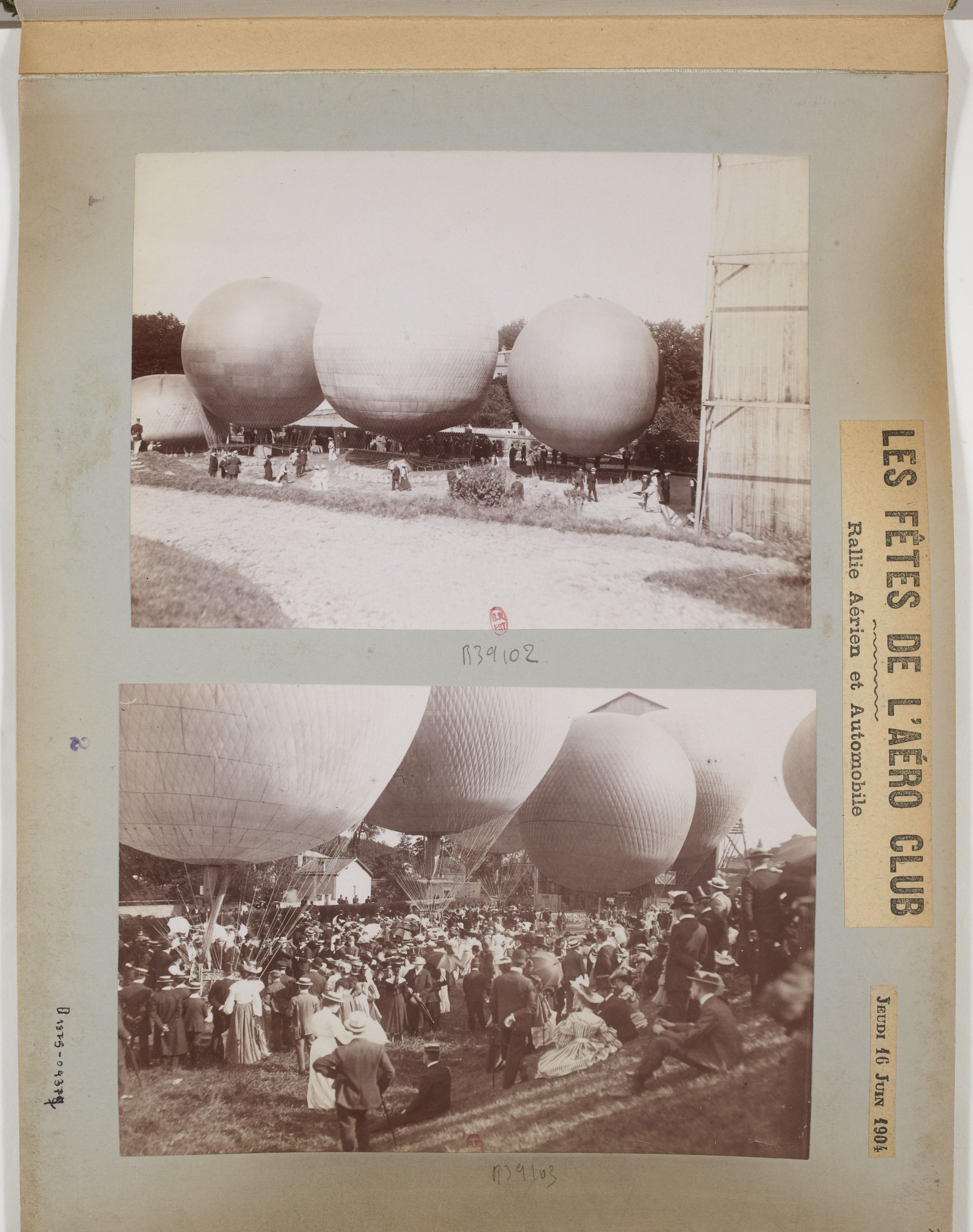
Aero Club festivities, air and automobile rally, June 16, 1904.

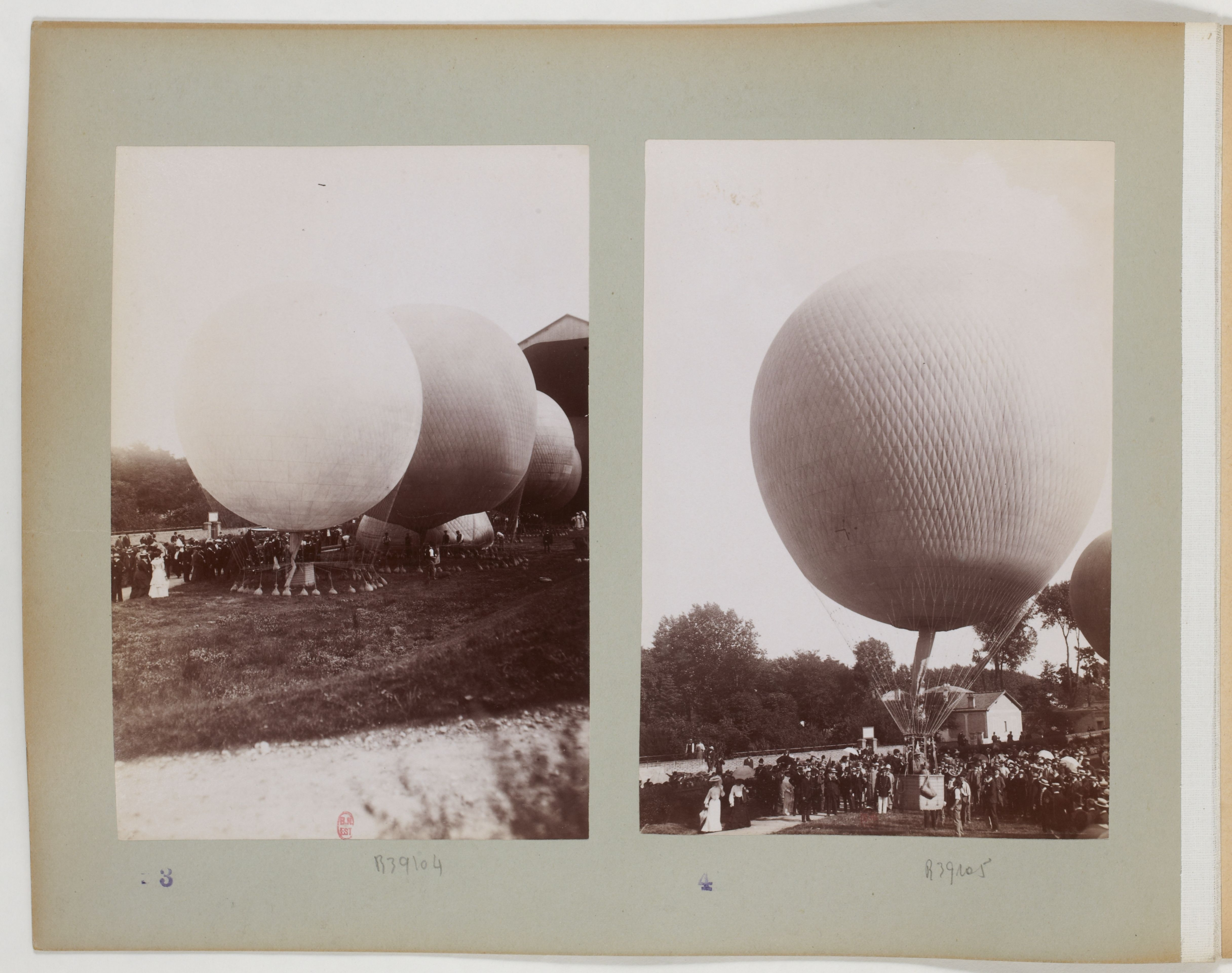

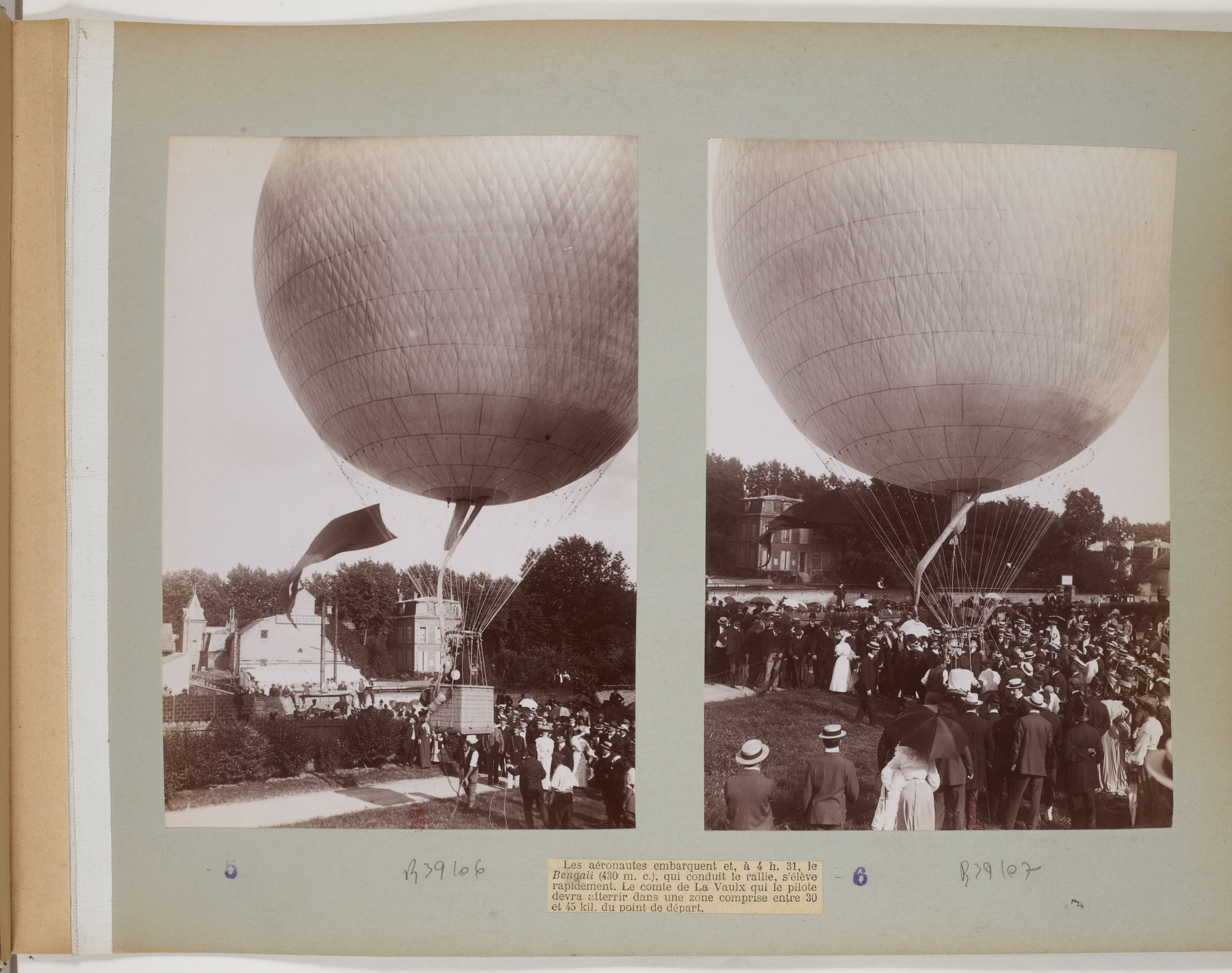

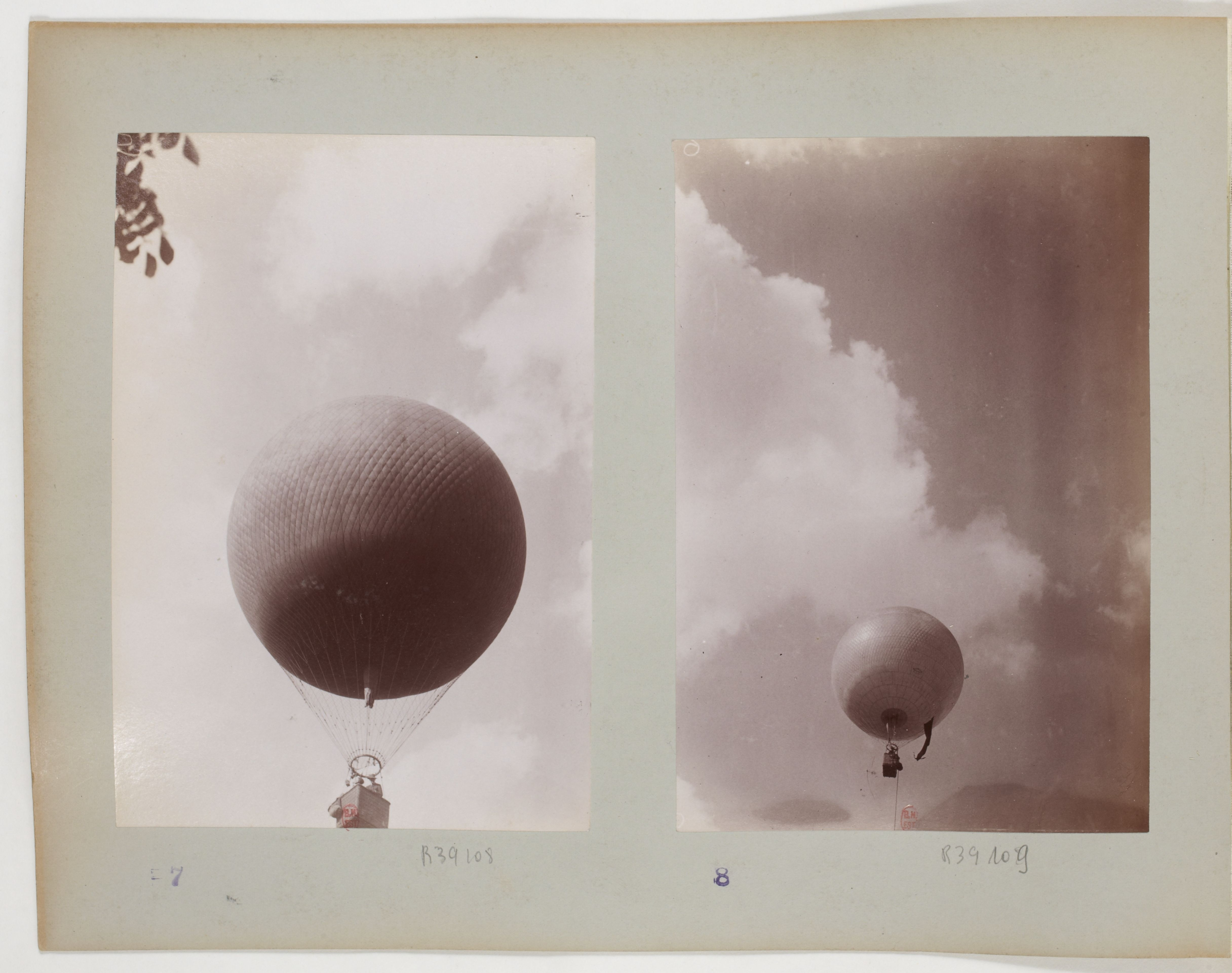

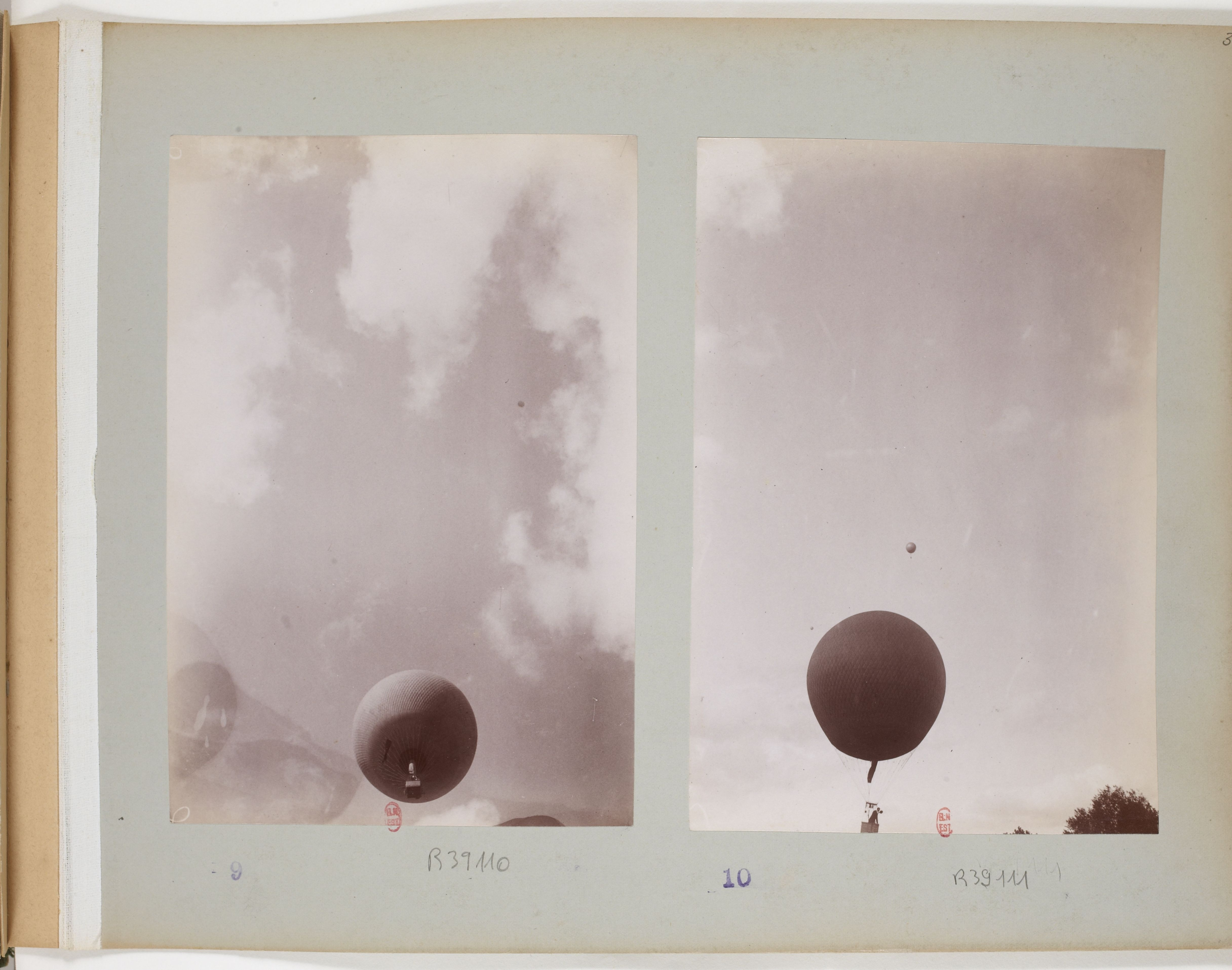

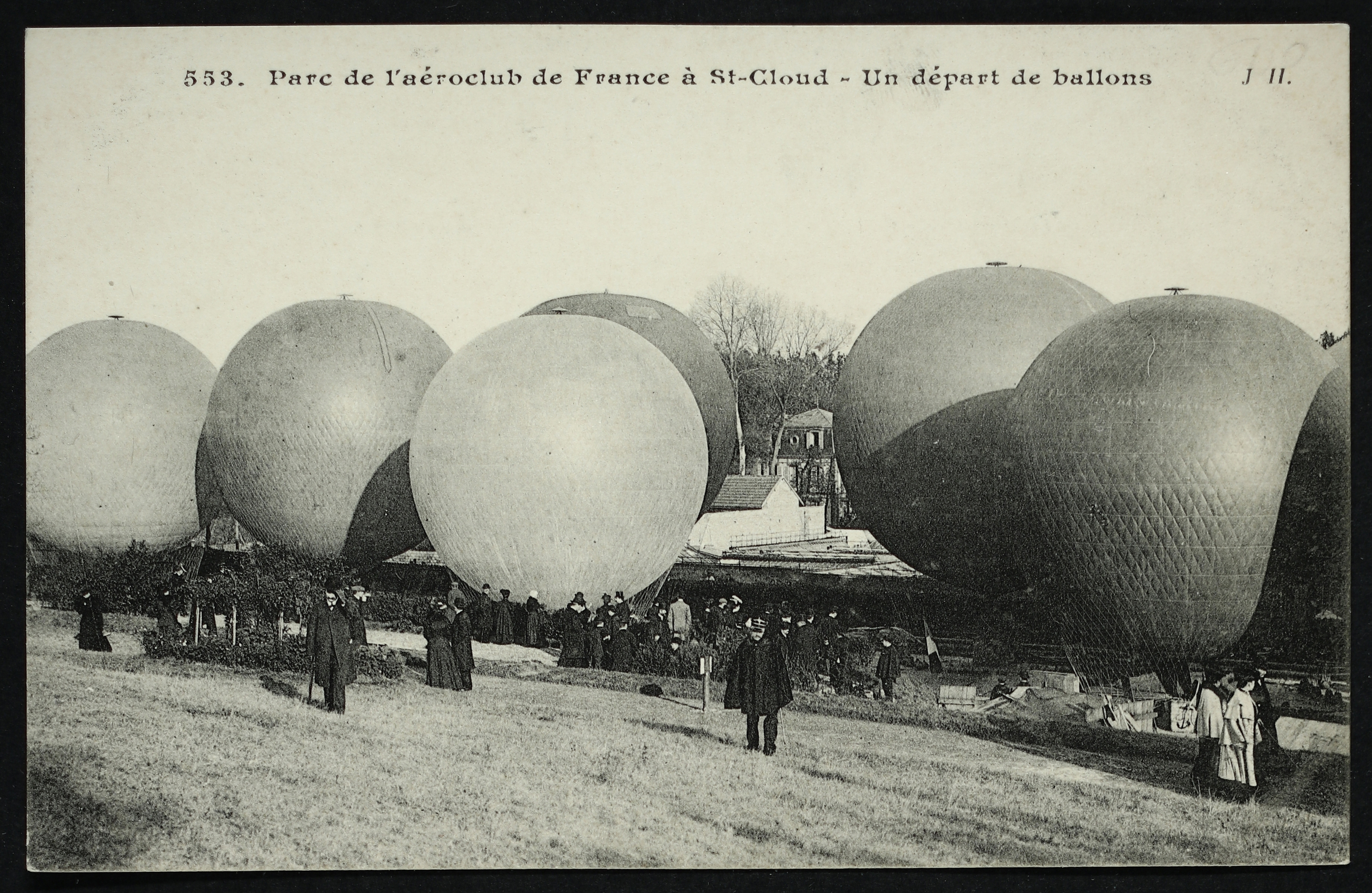
St. Cloud, 1910

== Medal ==
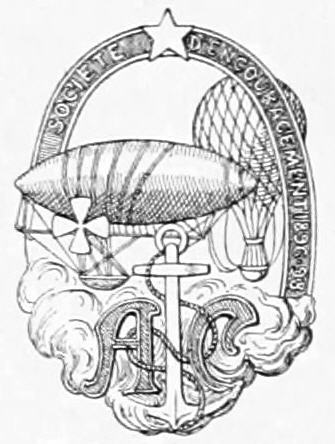
Logo of the Aéro-Club de France

The Club grants the Great Medal of the Aéro-Club de France to individuals who have made outstanding contributions to the advancement of aviation. The winners have been:

- 2025 - Tom Cruise
- 2020 - La Patrouille de France
- 2019 - Buzz Aldrin and Jean Pinet
- 2018 - Thomas Pesquet
- 2017 - Bertrand Piccard (second award) and André Borschberg
- 2015 - Aude Lemordant, Alexandre Orlowski, François Rallet, Damien Vadon
- 2012 - The Big Frog project team
- 2010 - The six members of the EC 725 Caracal helicopter team in Afghanistan
- 2006 - The flight test team of the Airbus A380 and the Dassault Falcon 7X
- 2005 - Pierre Guyoti
- 2004 - At the retirement of Concorde, the heads of EADS, British Aerospace, Air France and British Airways
- 2003 - Steve Fossett
- 2002 - The astronauts of the Andromeda mission
- 2000 - Jean-Pierre Haigneré, ESA astronaut
- 1998 - Bertrand Piccard, of the Breitling Orbiter 3 balloon
- 1997 - Claudie Haigneré, Shannon Lucid, Yelena Kondakova
- 1996 - Jules Roy, author
- 1995 - Serge Dassault
- 1994 - Henri Pescarolo
- 1988 - Jean Salis, Chuck Yeager
- 1986 - Patrick Baudry
- 1981 - John Young, Robert Crippen
- 1980 - Valérie André
- 1970 - Jim Lovell, Jack Swigert, Fred Haise
- 1969 - Neil Armstrong, Buzz Aldrin, Michael Collins
- 1967 - Adrienne Bolland, Élisabeth Boselli, Marcel Dassault, Didier Daurat, Jean Lasserre, Georges Libert, Henry Potez
- 1963 - Jacqueline Auriol
- 1958 - Gabriel Voisin
- 1946 - Léon Cuffaut
- 1938 - Henri Guillaumet, Paul Tissandier
- 1937 - Maryse Bastié
- 1931 - Maurice Noguès
- 1930 - Jean Mermoz, Maurice Bellonte
- 1928 - Joseph Le Brix
- 1927 - Charles Lindbergh
- 1923 - Louis Bréguet, Pierre-Georges Latécoère, Dieudonné Costes
- 1922 - Clément Ader
- 1920 - Joseph Sadi-Lecointe
- 1918 - Pier Piccio
- 1917 - Warrant Officer Lucien Jailler, Sergeant Walter Lovell, Warrant Officer Raoul Lufbery, Archibald Johnson, Willis Haviland, Captain Georges Thenault, Warrant Officer Harold Willis, Second Lieutenant Henri Languedoc, Lieutenant J.A. Tourtay, Second Lieutenant Hector Varlin, Second Lieutenant William Thaw, Lieutenant Albert Deullin, Captains Alfred Heurtaux and Georges Guynemer, Second Lieutenant Paul Tarascon, and Captain André Wateau
- 1914 - Elmer A. Sperry
- 1913 - Georges de Castillon de Saint-Victor
- 1912 - Roland Garros
- 1911 - Jules Védrines
- 1910 - Géo Chavez
- 1909 - Louis Blériot
- 1908 - Henri Farman, Wilbur Wright, Orville Wright
- 1901 - Alberto Santos-Dumont, Henri Deutsch de la Meurthe, Louis Robert Lebaudy
- 1900 - Henry de La Vaulx

== See also ==
- List of pilots awarded an Aviator's Certificate by the Aéro-Club de France in 1909
- List of pilots awarded an Aviator's Certificate by the Aéro-Club de France in 1911
- Fédération française de parachutisme
