= Henry de La Vaulx =

French balloonist (1870–1930)

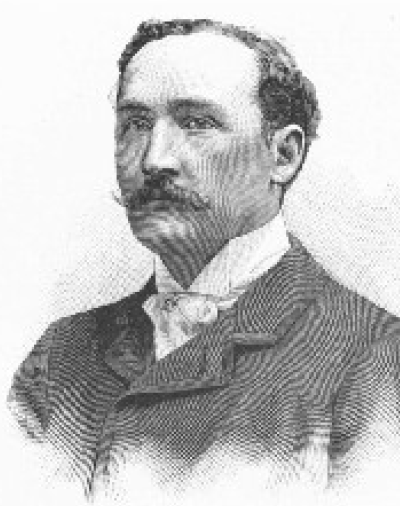
- Born: Comte Henry de La Vaulx; 2 April 1870; Bierville, France
- Died: 18 April 1930 (aged 60); Jersey City, New Jersey
- Cause of death: Aviation accident
- Resting place: Castle Rozoy-Bellevalle. 48.923611°N 3.456111°E
- Monuments: File:Tombe-La Vaulx.jpg
- Known for: cofounder of Aero Club of France, 1898; cofounder of FAI, 1905
- Awards: Grand Medal of the Aero Club of France, 1900
- Aviation career
- Famous flights: 1900 ballooning distance record

Henry de La Vaulx (1870–1930) was a French balloonist, author, and cofounder of major French and international aeronautical associations.

== Biography ==
He was born in Bierville, France on April 2, 1870.

From March 1896 to May 1897 he stayed with native tribes in Patagonia, and later wrote a book about this experience.

In 1898, he co-founded the Aero Club of France with Ernest Archdeacon, Léon Serpollet, Henri de la Valette, Jules Verne, Honorine de Viane Morel Verne, André Michelin, Albert de Dion, Alberto Santos-Dumont, and Henry Deutsch de la Meurthe.

On Oct 9, 1900 at the 1900 Summer Olympics he and a companion set a distance record in a balloon traveling 1200 miles from Vincennes to Korostyshiv near Kiev (Now Ukraine, then in Russia) in 35.75 hours. Also in 1900 he received the Grand Medal of the Aero Club of France for exceptional contributions to the progress of aviation.

In 1905 he cofounded and became a director of the Fédération Aéronautique Internationale (FAI). The FAI now awards the De la Vaulx Medal, named for him, given to holders of recognized absolute world aviation records set during the year before. He visited the United States several times for ballooning ventures and the New York Times described him as one of the "most successful and daring balloonists in the world."

He developed airships for the Zodiac company.

He published a dozen books, mostly on aviation.

He lived in the castle Rozoy-Bellevalle.

He died when a scheduled flight between Montreal, Canada and Newark, NJ that he was on collided with power lines on approach to Newark on April 18, 1930, and was buried in the Rozoy-Bellevalle cemetery.

== Published works ==
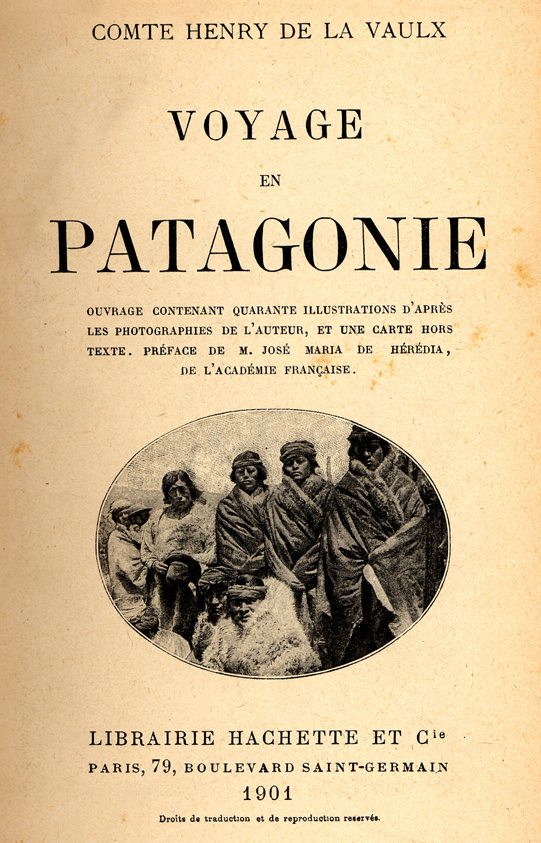
Book cover of Voyage en Patagonie by La Vaulx

- Voyage en Patagonie; ouvrage contenant quarante illustrations d’après les photographies de l’auteur, et une carte hors texte, Préf. José-Maria de Heredia, Paris, Hachette, 1901
- Les Anciens Habitants des rives du Colhué Huapi (Patagonie), Paris, Leroux, 1902
- La Montagne d'amour : tableau de la vie Araucane, [S.l.s.n.], 1902
- L’Emploi des ballons à ballonnet d’après la théorie du général Meusnier, Paris, Gauthier-Villars, 1903
- L’Aérostation, Paris, Larousse, 1906
- Le Tour du monde de deux gosses; le chemin des nuages, Paris, Tallandier, 1908
- Le Triomphe de la navigation aérienne, Paris, Tallandier, 1911
- Les Vainqueurs de l’air; histoire de l’aéronautique: ses débuts sportifs, son application militaire, sa réalisation commerciale, Paris, Hachette, 1921
- L’Aéronautique des origines à 1922, Paris, Floury, 1922
- Cent Mille Lieues dans les airs, Paris, Arthéme Fayard, 1925
- Joseph et Étienne de Montgolfier, Paris, Annonay, 1926
- Un Tour du monde en aéroplane, Paris, Albin Michel, 1930
- Bibliothèque de feu M. le comte Henry de La Vaulx, Paris, Bosse, 1930

== Legacy ==
- His name was given to a Latécoère 28 famously flown across the South Atlantic by Jean Mermoz.

== Naming and lexicography ==
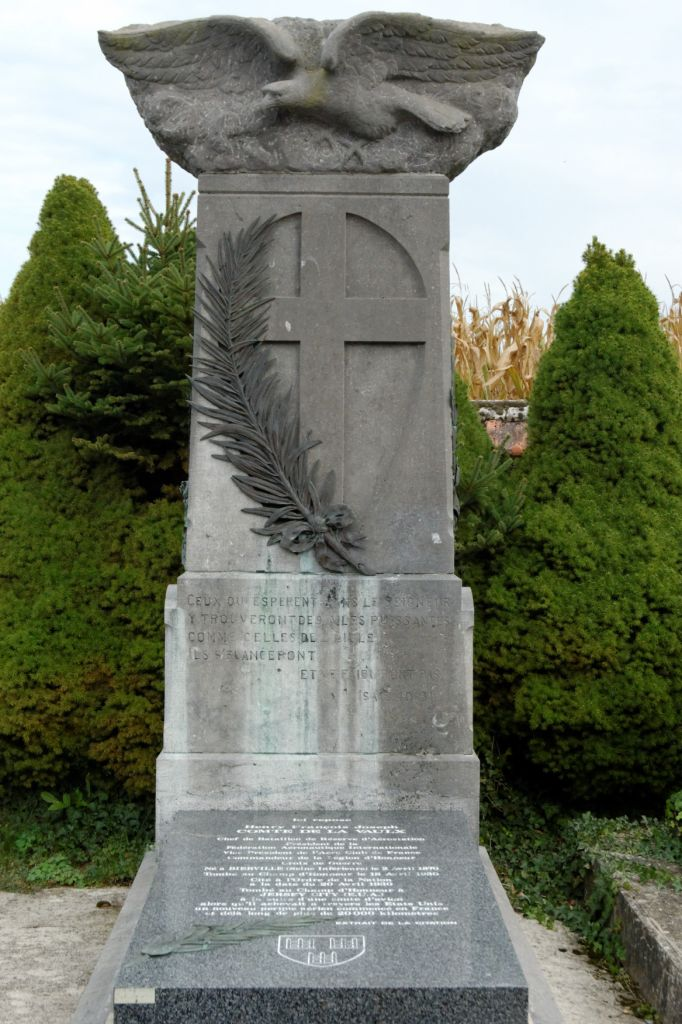
Tomb of La Vaulx

- He was often referred to as "comte de La Vaulx." Comte is a French title analogous to the British title "Count."
- His first name is sometimes written as Henri, the usual French spelling, but on the book cover at left, he used the spelling "Henry."
- His name is usually alphabetized as La Vaulx, Henry de.
