= S58 =

S58 may refer to:

- S58 (Long Island bus)
- Blériot-SPAD S.58, a French racing biplane
- BMW S58, an automobile engine
- INS Sindhuvir (S58), a submarine of the Indian Navy
- Shanghai–Changzhou Expressway
- SIAI S.58, a prototype Italian flying boat
- Sikorsky S-58, an American helicopter
