= Institut aérotechnique =

Research institute at Saint-Cyr-l'école

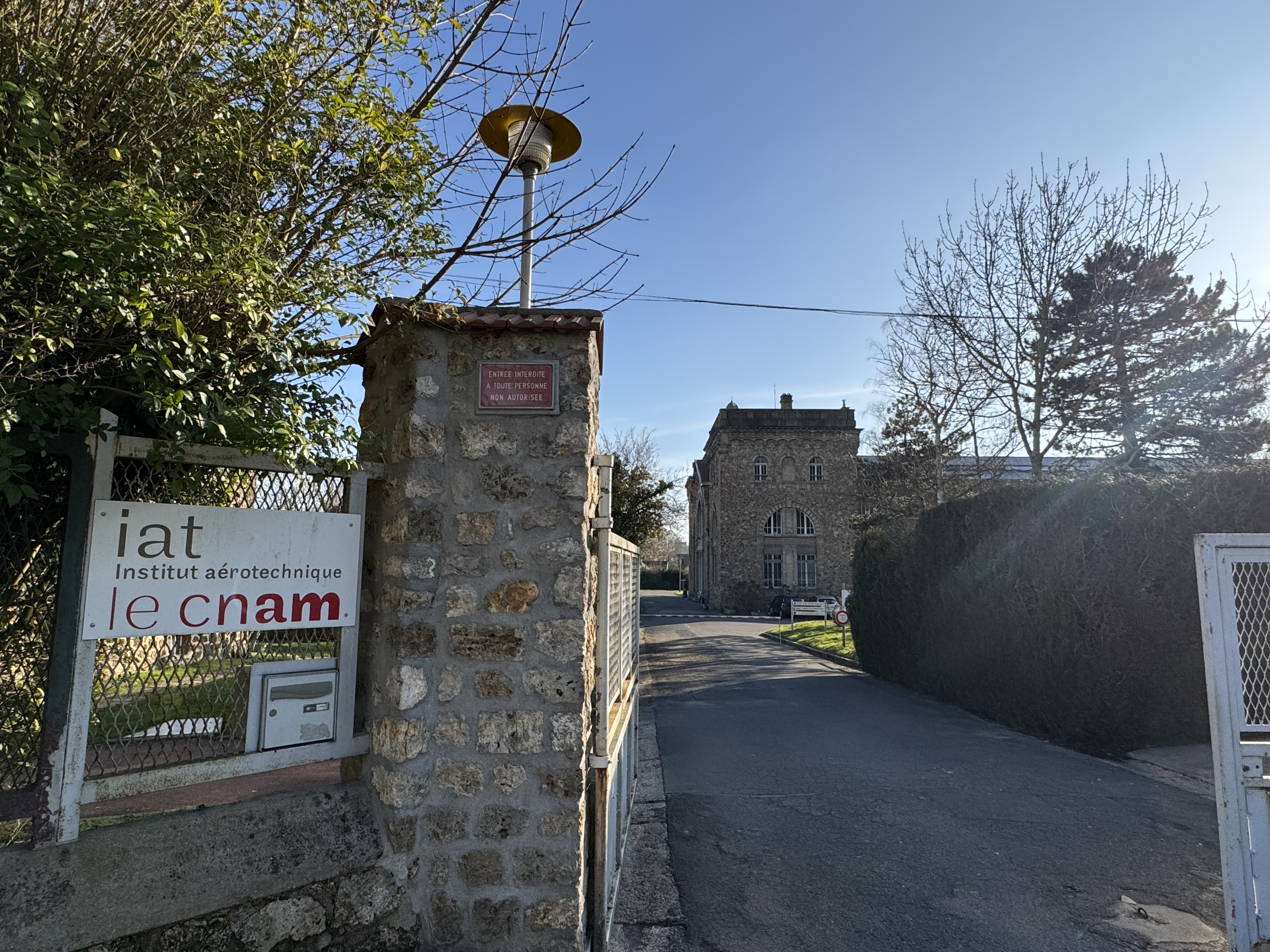
- Established: 1911
- Mission: Research
- Location: Saint-Cyr-l'école, France
- Coordinates: 48.7976941°N 2.0546247°E
- Website: iat.cnam.fr
- Position in France

The Institut aérotechnique (IAT) is a French public research laboratory part of the Conservatoire national des arts et métiers, specializing in aerodynamic studies, located in Saint-Cyr-l'École (Yvelines).

The creation of this institute is thanks to an initiative of Henri Deutsch de la Meurthe, also founder of the Aéro-Club de France. Its inauguration took place on July 8, 1911. It currently has several wind tunnels, some of which specialize in the automotive, railway and aerospace sectors. Concerning aeronautics, the laboratory has a partnership with the Institut polytechnique des sciences avancées.
