= Fédération Française Aéronautique =

The Fédération française aéronautique (FFA), (Fédération nationale aéronautique, FNA, before 2004) founded in 1929 and being recognized as a public service in 1933, is a French association which represents the majority of aeroclubs.

Its mission is:

- Assist and defend aeroclubs
- Preserve the number and quality of French aerodromes
- Develop and ease recognition of aeronautics
- Ease the formation of pilots in aeroclubs
- Help the youngest and evangelise aeronautics activities
- Contribute, as interlocutor of the Direction Générale de l'Aviation Civile, to enact the regulations and defend interests of private pilots
- Organise activities and aeronautics tests in France and abroad (attribution of regional or national titles, selection of French representatives at internationals competitions or exhibitions).

As of 2019, the FFA included over 600 aeroclubs and 41,000 pilots, 2,200 instructors and 2,500 aircraft.

== See also ==
- Fédération française de parachutisme
