= Blériot-SPAD S.58 =

1920s French aircraft

S.58
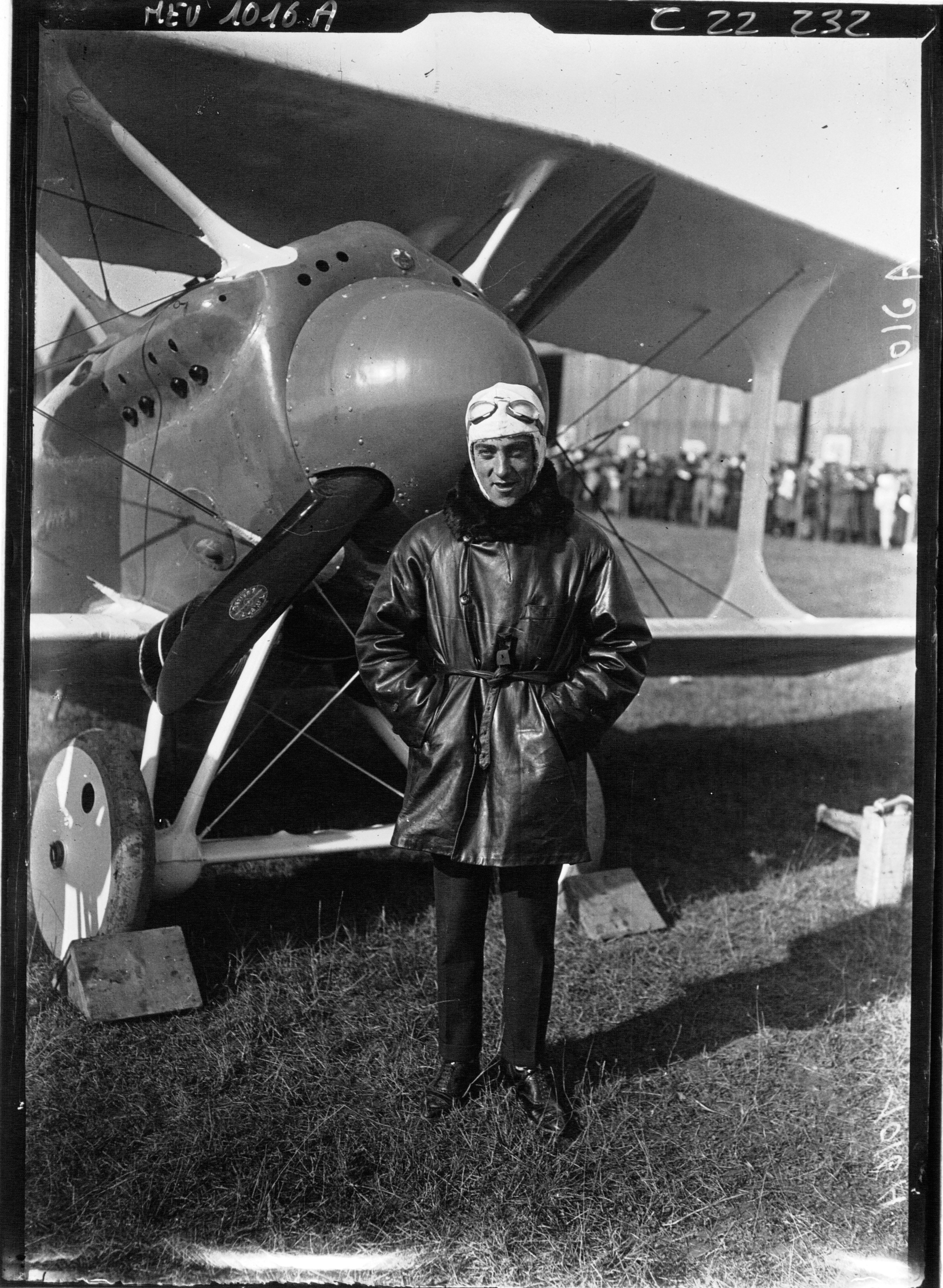
- Jean Casale at the 1922 Coupe Deutsch de la Meurthe

General information
- Type: Racing aircraft
- Manufacturer: SPAD
- Number built: 1

History
- First flight: 1922

The Blériot-SPAD S.58 was a French racing aircraft developed in the early 1920s.

== Design and development ==
The S.58 was derived from the S.41 and was a single-seat racer biplane which was made from wood and canvas. Although the S.58 was built for the Coupe Deutsch de la Meurthe of 1922, the pilot, Jean Casale, quickly gave up following the failure of one of the S.58's radiators.

== Specifications ==
Data from

General characteristics

- Crew: 1
- Length: 6 m (19 ft 8 in)
- Height: 2.8 m (9 ft 2 in)
- Wing area: 26.4 m^{2} (284 sq ft)
- Gross weight: 1,250 kg (2,756 lb)
- Powerplant: 1 × Lorraine 12E W-12 water-cooled piston engine, 340 kW (450 hp)
- Propellers: 2-bladed fixed-pitch propeller

Performance

- Maximum speed: 250 km/h (160 mph, 130 kn)

== See also ==
Related development

- S.41
