= S41 =

S41 may refer to:

== Aircraft ==
- Blériot-SPAD S.41, a French fighter aircraft
- Short S.41, a British biplane floatplane
- Sikorsky S-41, an American flying boat

== Rail and transit ==
- S41 (Berlin), an S-Bahn line in Germany
- S41 (Long Island bus), United States
- S41 (ZVV), a line of the Zurich S-Bahn, Switzerland
- S41, a rush-hour line of Lucerne S-Bahn, Switzerland

== Submarines ==
- ARA Santa Cruz (S-41), of the Argentine Navy
- Brazilian submarine Humaitá (S41)
- HMS Unseen (S41), of the Royal Navy
- INS Vagir (S41), of the Indian Navy
- USS S-41 (SS-146), of the United States Navy

== Music ==
Sum 41, a Canadian punk rock band

== Other uses ==
- New Jersey Route 73, designated Route S41 until 1953
- S41: In case of fire and/or explosion do not breathe fumes, a safety phrase
- Sulfur-41, an isotope of sulfur
- Xhosa language
- S41, a postcode district in Chesterfield, England
