= Suzanne Deutsch de la Meurthe =

French patron of the arts and aviation (1892–1937)

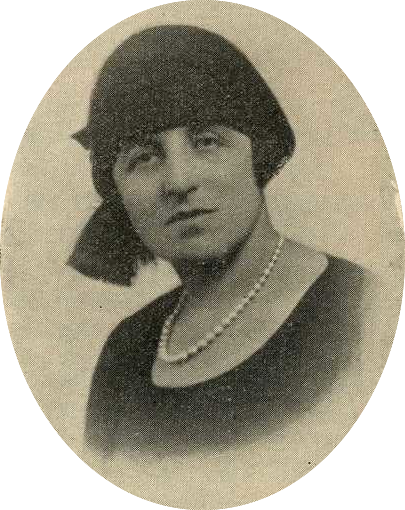
- Born: Suzanne Henriette Charlotte Deutsch de la Meurthe; September 20, 1892; Paris
- Died: November 29, 1937 (aged 45); Paris
- Parent: Henri Deutsch de la Meurthe

Suzanne Henriette Charlotte Deutsch de la Meurthe (20 September 1892 – 29 November 1937) was a French Jewish philanthropist who inherited a fortune from her father, a highly successful industrialist. She is remembered for restoring the village of Moÿ-de-l'Aisne which was devastated during the First World War and for launching a more effective version of the Coupe Deutsch de la Meurthe, triggering the development of civil aviation in France in the 1930s.

== Early life ==
Born on 20 September 1892 in Paris, Suzanne Henriette Charlotte Deutsch de la Meurthe was the daughter of Marguerite Ida Caroline (née Henriques Raba) (1854–1941) and successful petroleum businessman Henri Deutsch de la Meurthe (1846–1919). She was the third of four daughters. Her grandfather, Alexandre Deutsch de la Meurthe (1815–1889), had already developed a thriving vegetable oil business before extending his interests into petroleum imported from the United States. Raised in the Château de Romainville in les Yvelines, she followed with interest her father's support of aviation developments in France.

== Career ==
During the First World War (1914–1918), Suzanne Deutsch de la Meurthe was a volunteer nurse in Biarritz where she cared for wounded soldiers from the front. One of her patients was Germain Testart from Picardie. After the war, she visited him in the village of Moÿ-de-l’Aisne which had been devastated during the fighting.

She decided to rebuild the village for its inhabitants, restoring the water supply, constructing housing and providing sports facilities and a gymnasium. After completing work on the village itself in 1928, she built a textile factory providing work for the villagers.

In 1922 she bought a Hispano-Suiza H6B car chassis and had it delivered to Jean Henri-Labourdette for a skiff torpédo body to be added. The car is now in the collection of the Mullin Automotive Museum in Oxnard, California and was displayed at the Victoria and Albert Museum exhibition Cars: Accelerating the Modern World in 2019–2020. In 1930 she bought a 1929 Hispano-Suiza K6 6.6L Inline 6-Cylinder car and raced it in that year's 1930 Rallye Paris – Saint-Raphaël Féminin.

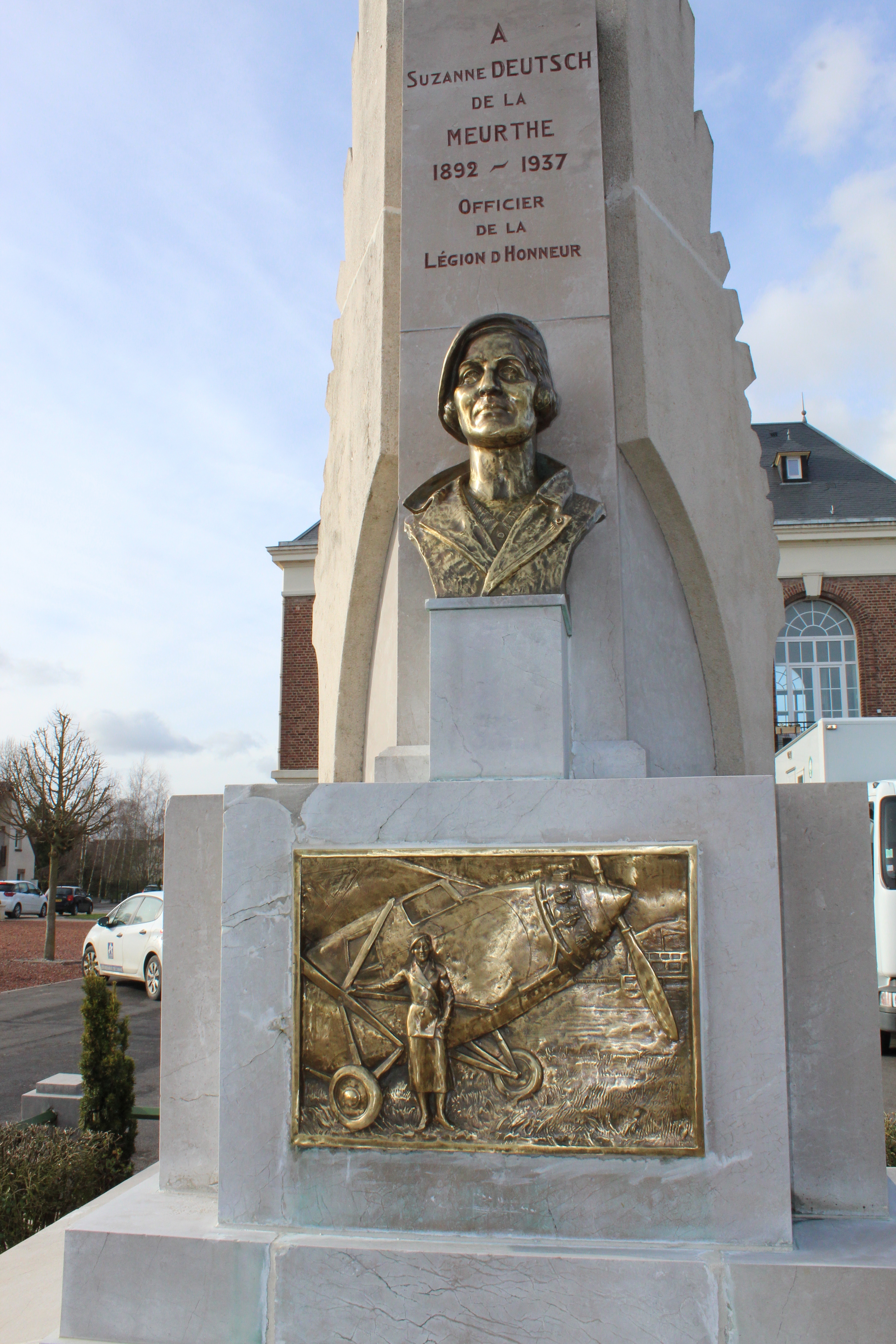
Monument to Suzanne Deutsch de La Meurthe in Moÿ-de-l'Aisne

Suzanne's father had been an avid supporter of French aviation, both airships and planes. From 1900, he encouraged participation by launching various competitions from 1900 for both civil and military aircraft. Following in his footsteps, in 1931 she revived the Coupe Deutsh de la Meurthe, this time with a view to improving the speed of planes which continued until 1936.

She established and headed the Aéro-club de l'Aisne in 1921, and supported the Club Roland Garros. For these activities, she was decorated as an Officier of the Legion of Honour in 1935.

Suzanne Deutsch de la Meurthe died of a heart condition in Paris on 29 November 1937.

== Commemoration ==
The College Suzanne Deutsch de la Meurthe in Moÿ-de-l'Aisne is named in her honour and the town also has a monument to commemorate her work to rebuild it following the First World War.
