= Rozoy-Bellevalle =

- Commune
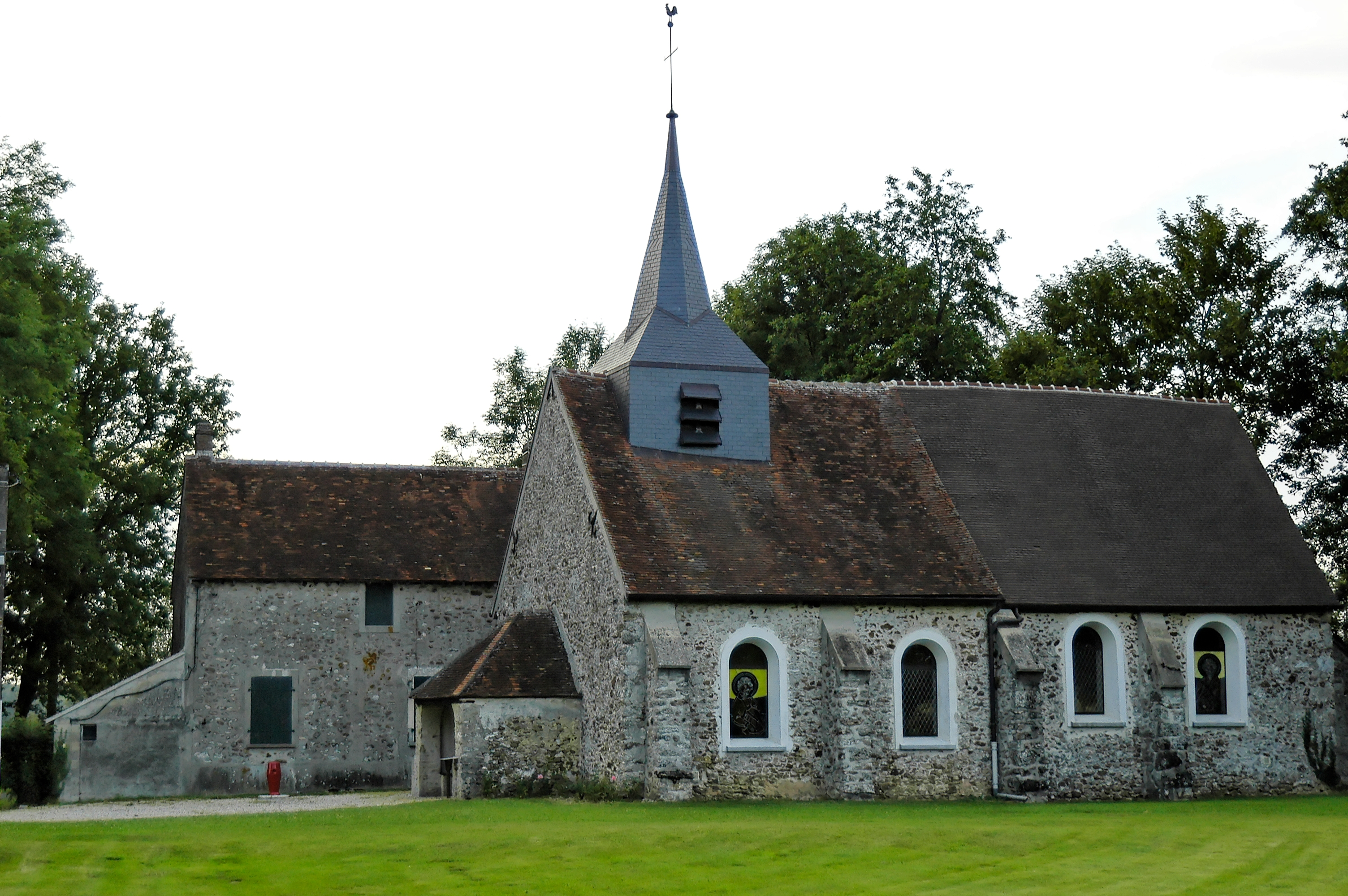
- The church of Rozoy
- Location of Rozoy-Bellevalle
- Location within France Location within Hauts-de-France
- Coordinates: 48°55′25″N 3°27′22″E
- Country: France
- Region: Hauts-de-France
- Department: Aisne
- Arrondissement: Château-Thierry
- Canton: Essômes-sur-Marne
- Intercommunality: CA Région de Château-Thierry

Government
  - Mayor (2026–32): Pascal Bollaert
- Area^{1}: 6.79 km^{2} (2.62 sq mi)
- Elevation: 200 m (660 ft)
- Highest elevation: 222 m (728 ft)
- Lowest elevation: 189 m (620 ft)
- Population (2023): 122
  - Density: 18.0/km^{2} (46.5/sq mi)
- Time zone: UTC+01:00 (CET)
  - Summer (DST): UTC+02:00 (CEST)
- INSEE/Postal code: 02664 /02540
- ^{1} French Land Register data, which excludes lakes, ponds, glaciers > 1 km^{2} (0.386 sq mi or 247 acres) and river estuaries.

Rozoy-Bellevalle (French pronunciation: [ʁozwa bɛlval]) is a commune in the Aisne department in Hauts-de-France in northern France. It is part of the canton of Essômes-sur-Marne and the arrondissement of Château-Thierry.

== Population ==
Historical population
| Year | Pop. | ±% p.a. |
|---|---|---|
| 1968 | 77 | — |
| 1975 | 53 | −5.20% |
| 1982 | 76 | +5.28% |
| 1990 | 94 | +2.69% |
| 1999 | 100 | +0.69% |
| 2007 | 110 | +1.20% |
| 2012 | 109 | −0.18% |
| 2017 | 116 | +1.25% |
| 2023 | 122 | +0.84% |
Source: INSEE

== Personalities ==
Balloonist Henry de La Vaulx lived at the castle there and is buried there.

== See also ==
- Communes of the Aisne department
