= Aude Lemordant =

Aude Lemordant (born May 1, 1982) is a French aerobatics champion and an airline pilot for Air France.

== Biography ==
Aude Lemordant was born in 1982, in Grenoble.

She took her first flight at the age of 14. In 1998, she obtained her glider pilot license. In 2000, Aude Lemordant earned her private pilot license for airplanes in the United States. A graduate of the École Nationale de l'Aviation Civile (French Civil Aviation University), Aude Lemordant worked in glider towing, pipeline surveillance, and flight instruction at flying clubs. She joined Air France at age 21 and, at 22, became one of the youngest airline pilots flying the Airbus A320.

Her training led her to discover aerobatics. After obtaining glider and airplane aerobatics ratings, she began competing and rapidly rose through the ranks, ultimately winning the world championship title in 2013 and 2015. She then took a two-year break for the birth of her daughter. 2018 marked her return to competition, a year in which she became the French champion. She defended her title at the 2019 World Championships in Châteauroux. After qualifying for the French national aerobatics team in April 2019, Aude Lemordant secured her third world aerobatics championship title on 30 August 2019 —a first for France. She also became a world team champion in 2019, as France swept all the titles and claimed multiple podium spots.

Aude Lemordant is also qualified to fly vintage aircraft, mountain aircraft, seaplanes, and microlights.

== Honours ==
- Chevalière de l'ordre national du Mérite) (Knight of the National Order of Merit) (2016)
- Médaille de l'Aéronautique (Aeronautics Medal)
- Médaille de l'Académie de l'Air et de l'Espace (Medal of the Academy of Air and Space) (28 November 2014)
- Grande Médaille de l'Aéro-Club de France (Grand Medal of the Aero-Club de France) (2015)
