= Jean Pinet =

French engineer and aviator (born 1929)

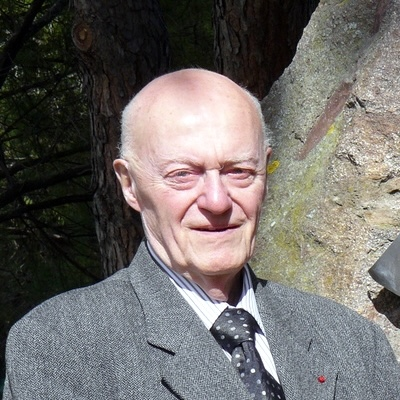
- Jean Pinet in 2014
- Born: September 13, 1929 (age 95)
- Occupation(s): Pilot, aeronautical engineer, official, customer crew trainer
- Known for: First person to take Concorde supersonic

Jean Pinet (born 13 September 1929) is a French aviator and aeronautical engineer; as a former Concorde test pilot, he was the first person to take Concorde supersonic, in early October 1969.

== Early life ==
He grew up near Tarbes in south-west France. He attended the Institut supérieur de l'aéronautique et de l'espace until 1952, gaining an engineering degree.

== Career ==
=== French Air Force ===
He trained as pilot with the French Air Force, and trained in the US, returning to France in 1954.

He was stationed in Creil, when in the air force, and operated in the Dassault Ouragan and Dassault Mystère IV.

=== Research engineer ===
He left the air force in 1956 and joined the aeronautical research centre (Centre d'essais en vol) at Brétigny-sur-Orge in 1957, and also worked at the research centre's site at Cazaux Air Base.

In 1958 he acquired the test pilot licence, when training with EPNER (École du personnel navigant d'essais et de réception) at the Istres-Le Tubé Air Base on the southern edge of France.

=== Sud Aviation ===
He joined Sud Aviation in October 1965. He first flew Concorde on 30 March 1969. He last flew on Concorde on 19 April 1985, and remained as a test pilot for Airbus, and retired in 1994.

Concorde first went supersonic on Wednesday 1 October 1969 at 715 mph (1,151 km/h) at 36,000 feet (11,000 m) for ten minutes over France in Concorde 001. Another test pilot was Jean Franchi.

He was responsible for customer crew training of Concorde, and for the flight handling testing of Concorde. He has worked in the field of cognitive ergonomics, with regard to aviation safety and pilot training.

He was Secretary General from 1992 to 2004 of the Académie de l'air et de l'espace (AAE).

== Books ==
- Facing the Unexpected in Flight: Human Limitations and Interaction with Technology in the Cockpit, 27 October 2015, CRC Press ISBN 9781498718714
- Les hommes de Concorde: Ils ont piloté la légende, JPO, 14 March 2019, ISBN 237301100X
