= Fédération française de parachutisme =

The Fédération française de parachutisme (FFP; English: French Parachuting Federation) the national governing body for skydiving in France. It is a member of Fédération Aéronautique Internationale.

== Overview ==
The FFP was founded on 10 December 1949 as the Fédération nationale des parachutistes français. It has been a public entity delegate of the Ministry of Youth, Sports and Associative Life since 1972. The Fédération Française de Parachutisme is responsible for the organization and promotion of skydiving and indoor skydiving in France. There are 270 affiliated parachuting groups, including 42 parachuting schools. In 2019 there were 65 591 licensed members and a total of 601 210 jumps.

== See also ==
- United States Parachute Association
- British Skydiving
