= Henri Deutsch de la Meurthe =

French businessman

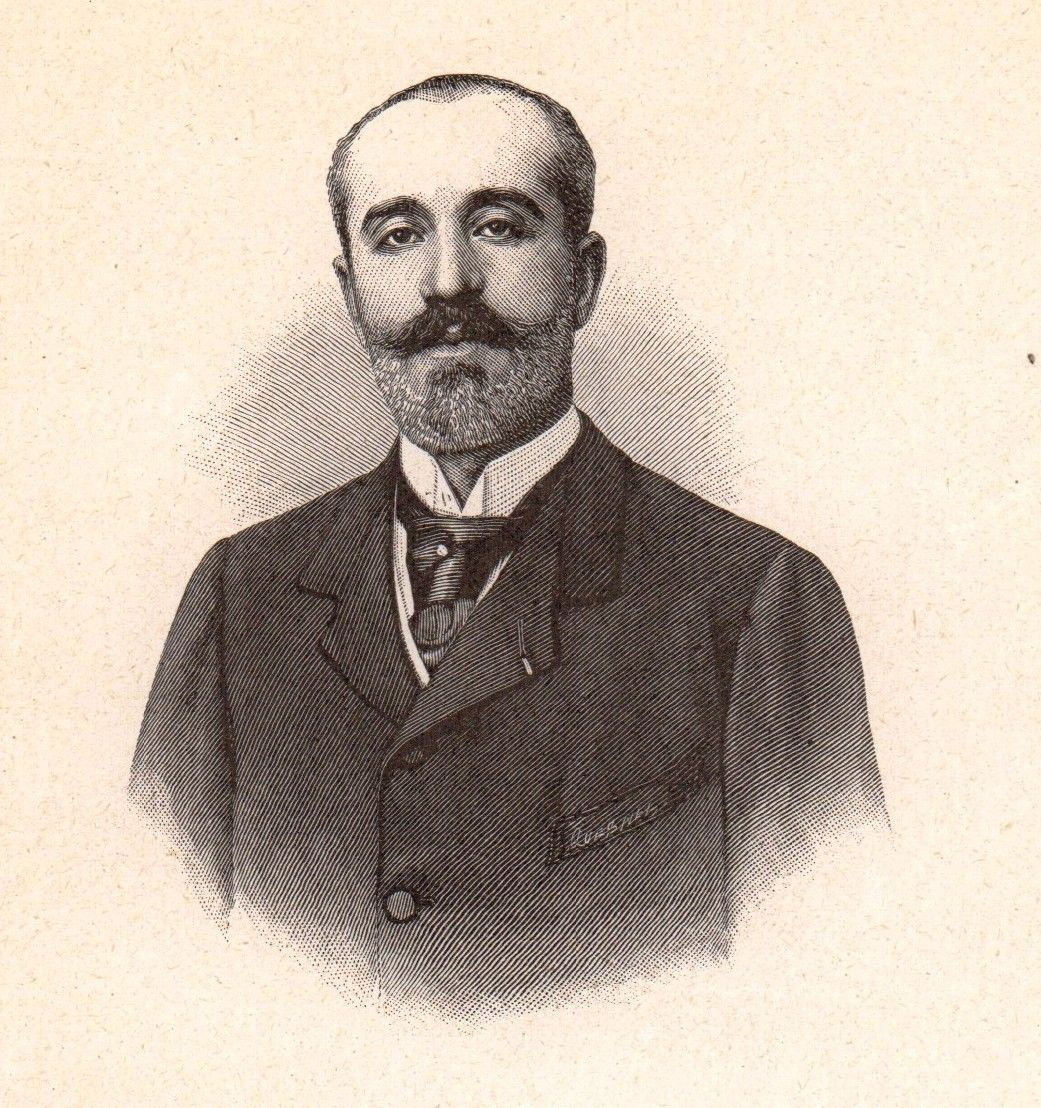
- Deutsch c. 1903
- Born: Salomon Henry Deutsch; 25 September 1846; Paris, France
- Died: 24 November 1919 (aged 73); Paris, France
- Known for: Petroleum businessman

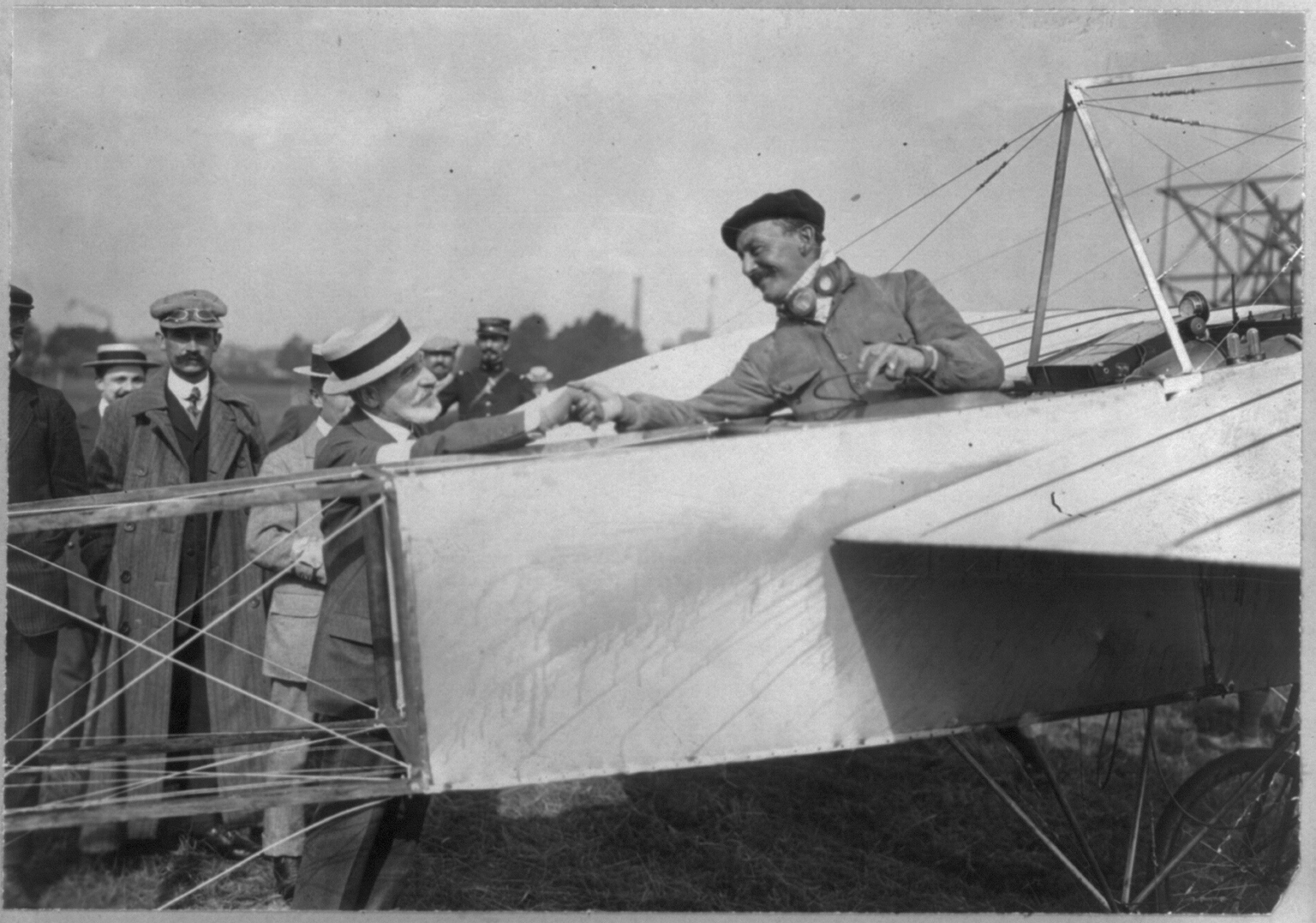
Alfred Leblanc in airplane, being congratulated by Deutsch de la Meurthe, in Nancy, France after the Circuit de l'Est d'Aviation

Henri Deutsch de la Meurthe (French: [ɑ̃ʁi døtsʃ də la mœʁt]; 25 September 1846 – 24 November 1919), born Salomon Henry Deutsch, was a successful French petroleum businessman (known as the "Oil King of Europe"), and a supporter of early aviation. He sponsored a number of prizes to encourage the development of aviation technologies, including the Grand Prix d'Aviation and the Deutsch de la Meurthe prize.

== Early life, family and name ==
The Deutsch de la Meurthe was a French family known for its wealth and patronage in technology and philanthropy, having helped develop the industrial oils industry in France. In 1845, Alexander Deutsch founded a company for the processing and marketing of vegetable oils in La Villette, then an independent commune of Paris. With the discovery of petroleum oil in Pennsylvania in 1859, Deutsch began to study and develop the use of petroleum oils in France. In 1877, Deutsch brought his two sons, Henri and Emile, into the family business, which bought a refinery in Rouen in 1881 and another in St. Loubès in Gironde in 1883. In 1889, in association with the Rothschild brothers, oil refining began in Spain. At this time, Alexander added the "de la Meurthe" to the family name. His daughter Suzanne was a noted philanthropist.

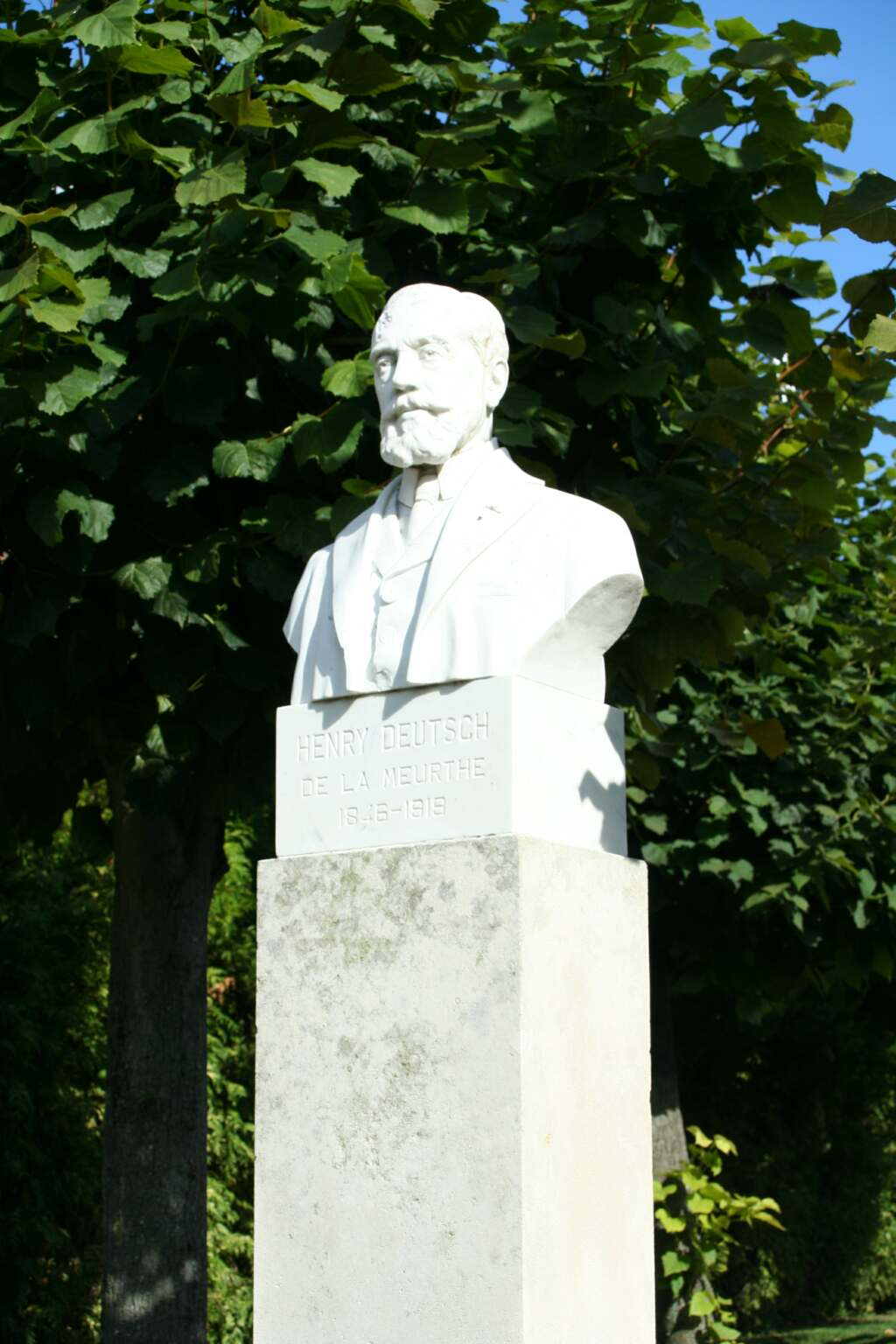

== Career ==
Henri recognized that the future of petroleum sales depended on the development of small internal-combustion engines, so he promoted automobile development (he presented French President Marie François Sadi Carnot with an automobile) and also became interested in aviation. Together with Ernest Archdeacon, he founded the Aéro-Club de France to promote the new technologies. To do this, he used some of his wealth to create a number of monetary prizes as incentives for aviators to achieve certain aviation milestones.

In 1906, Deutsch entered into a partnership with Wilbur Wright and Hart O. Berg to establish a company in France to supply a Wright aircraft to the French government. Deutsch financed the venture by buying the only block of shares to be sold in France, and used his influence with the French government. The effort fell through, however.

He supported Lazare Weiller, who bought the patents of the Wright brothers, and organized demonstration flights piloted by Wilbur Wright in Le Mans, which began on 8 August 1908. Deutsch de la Meurthe also invested in aircraft builders Société Astra (1909) and Nieuport (1911), and commissioned the construction of aircraft, including the Blériot XXIV Limousine and the Voisin Aero-Yacht.

At the end of May 1909, Henri Deutsch de la Meurthe offered the University of Paris a sum of 500,000 francs and an annual pension of 15,000 francs for the creation and maintenance of the Institut Aérotechnique at Saint-Cyr-l'École, which would continue the theoretical research and development of air transport aircraft. It was later integrated into the Conservatoire National des Arts et Métiers.

Although an enthusiastic promoter of heavier-than-air flight, De la Meurthe did not make his first flight in an airplane until May 1911, when he was taken for a flight in a Blériot monoplane piloted by Alfred Leblanc. On 21 May 1911, Deutsch was injured, and French Minister of War Maurice Berteaux was killed at the beginning of the 1911 Paris to Madrid air race, when a monoplane piloted by Louis Émile Train made a forced landing and ran into a group of people, including cabinet members, who had spilled out of the enclosures and onto the flying field.

== Legacy looted under Nazis ==
Over twenty years after Deutsch's death, the Deutsch de la Meurthe family fled when the Nazis invaded France in World War II. Their mansion was transformed into a residence for the head of the occupation forces, and their art collection was looted, ending up in the possession of the son of Hildebrand Gurlitt, one of Hitler's art dealers. Four drawings were restituted to the heirs in 2020.

== Honours ==
Henri Deutsch de la Meurthe was posthumously made Commander of the Legion of Honor on November 20, 1912.

== Prizes ==
=== Deutsch de la Meurthe prize ===
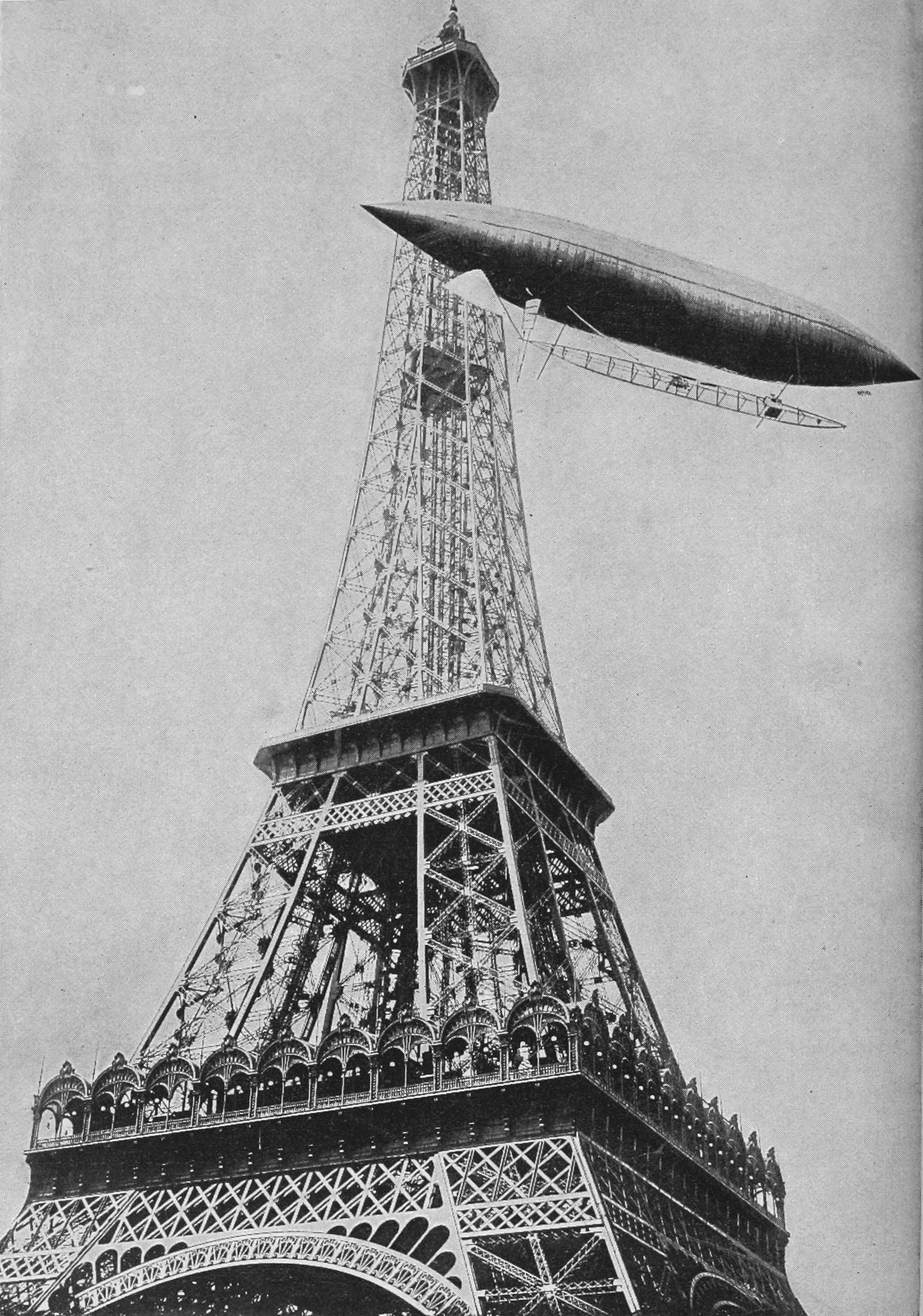
Alberto Santos-Dumont circling the Eiffel Tower with the airship number 5 on 13 July 1901: This photograph is often erroneously identified as the airship number 6. Photo courtesy of the Smithsonian Institution (SI Neg. No. 85-3941).

In April 1900, Henri offered the Deutsch de la Meurthe prize, also simply known as the Deutsch prize, of 100,000 francs to the first machine capable of flying a round trip from the Parc Saint Cloud to the Eiffel Tower in Paris and back in less than 30 minutes. The winner of the prize needed to maintain an average ground speed of at least 22 km/h (14 mph) to cover the round trip distance of 11 km (6.8 mi) in the allotted time. The prize was to be available from May 1, 1900, to October 1, 1903.

To win the prize, Alberto Santos-Dumont decided to build the Santos-Dumont No. 5, a larger airship than his earlier craft. On August 8, 1901, during one of his attempts, the dirigible began to lose hydrogen gas. It started to descend and was unable to clear the roof of the Trocadero Hotel. Santos-Dumont was left hanging in a basket from the side of the hotel. With the help of the Paris fire brigade, he climbed to the roof without injury.

On October 19, 1901, after several attempts and trials, Santos-Dumont launched his Number 6 airship at 2:30 pm. After only nine minutes of flight, Santos-Dumont had rounded the Eiffel Tower, but then suffered an engine failure. To restart the engine, he had to climb back over the gondola rail without a safety harness. The attempt was successful, and he crossed the finish line in 29 minutes 30 seconds. However, a short delay arose before his mooring line was secured, and at first the adjudicating committee refused him the prize, despite de la Meurthe, who was present, declaring himself satisfied. This caused a public outcry from the crowds watching the flight, as well as comment in the press. However a face-saving compromise was reached, and Santos-Dumont was awarded the prize. In a charitable gesture, he gave half the prize to his crew and then donated the other half to the poor of Paris.

=== Grand Prix d'Aviation ===
In 1904, Deutsch de la Meurthe in collaboration with Ernest Archdeacon created the Grand Prix d'Aviation (also known as the "Deutsch-Archdeacon Prize"), a prize of 50,000 francs for the first person to fly a circular 1-kilometer course in a heavier-than-air craft. It was won on January 13, 1908, by Henry Farman flying a Voisin biplane at Issy-les-Moulineaux in a time of 1 minute 28 seconds, then a distance and speed record since the flights of the Wright Brothers had not been officially witnessed.

=== Coupe Deutsch de la Meurthe ===
This speed race was held intermittently from 1912 to 1936, with 20,000 francs offered first by Deutsch, later by the Aéro-Club de France. It was rebooted a third time by his daughter Suzanne Deutsch de La Meurthe with the first of three final races in 1933.

== See also ==
- Place des États-Unis
