= Blériot-SPAD S.41 =

S.41

General information
- Type: Fighter
- Manufacturer: Blériot
- Designer: André Herbemont
- Primary user: Aéronautique Militaire
- Number built: 1

History
- First flight: 16 July 1922

The Blériot-SPAD S.41 was a French fighter aircraft developed in the early 1920s.

== Design and development ==
The S.41 was a refinement of the S.XX and was a single-seat fighter biplane which had a monocoque fuselage made of wood. The wings, on the other hand, were made of wood and metal. In 1924, the S.41 was converted to a racer and redesignated S.41bis.

== Specifications ==
Data from

General characteristics

- Crew: one
- Length: 6.65 m (21 ft 10 in)
- Wingspan: 8.68 m (28 ft 6 in)
- Height: 2.76 m (9 ft 1 in)
- Wing area: 26.40 m^{2} (284.2 sq ft)
- Empty weight: 887 kg (1,956 lb)
- Gross weight: 1,307 kg (2,881 lb)
- Powerplant: 1 × Hispano-Suiza 8Fb inline engine , 224 kW (300 hp)

Performance

- Maximum speed: 238 km/h (148 mph, 129 kn)
- Cruise speed: 205 km/h (127 mph, 111 kn)
- Service ceiling: 6,850 m (22,470 ft)

Armament

- 2 × fixed, forward-firing 7.7 mm (0.303 in) Vickers machine guns

== See also ==
Related development

- S.20

== Bibliography ==
- Bruner, Georges (1977). "Fighters a la Francaise, Part One". Air Enthusiast (3): 85–95. ISSN 0143-5450.
