= List of The New York Times number-one books of 2001 =

The American daily newspaper The New York Times publishes multiple weekly lists ranking the best selling books in the United States. The lists are split into three genres—fiction, nonfiction and children's books. Both the fiction and nonfiction lists are further split into multiple lists.

== Fiction ==
The following list ranks the number-one best selling fiction books, in the hardcover fiction category.

Date	Book	Author
January 7	The Bear and the Dragon	Tom Clancy
January 14	From the Corner of His Eye	Dean Koontz
January 21	From the Corner of His Eye	Dean Koontz
January 28	From the Corner of His Eye	Dean Koontz
February 4	A Day Late and a Dollar Short	Terry McMillan
February 11	A Day Late and a Dollar Short	Terry McMillan
February 18	A Day Late and a Dollar Short	Terry McMillan
February 25	A Painted House	John Grisham
March 4	A Painted House	John Grisham
March 11	A Painted House	John Grisham
March 18	A Painted House	John Grisham
March 25	1st to Die	James Patterson
April 1	1st to Die	James Patterson
April 8	Dreamcatcher	Stephen King
April 15	Dreamcatcher	Stephen King
April 22	Dreamcatcher	Stephen King
April 29	A Common Life	Jan Karon
May 6	On the Street Where You Live	Mary Higgins Clark
May 13	On the Street Where You Live	Mary Higgins Clark
May 20	On the Street Where You Live	Mary Higgins Clark
May 27	On the Street Where You Live	Mary Higgins Clark
June 3	Chosen Prey	John Sandford
June 10	Chosen Prey	John Sandford
June 17	Chosen Prey	John Sandford
June 24	"P" Is for Peril	Sue Grafton
July 1	"P" Is for Peril	Sue Grafton
July 8	Seven Up	Janet Evanovich
July 15	Leap of Faith	Danielle Steel
July 22	Leap of Faith	Danielle Steel
July 29	The Fourth Hand	John Irving
August 5	Suzanne's Diary for Nicholas	James Patterson
August 12	Suzanne's Diary for Nicholas	James Patterson
August 19	Suzanne's Diary for Nicholas	James Patterson
August 26	Suzanne's Diary for Nicholas	James Patterson
September 2	Valhalla Rising	Clive Cussler
September 9	Valhalla Rising	Clive Cussler
September 16	Valhalla Rising	Clive Cussler
September 23	Valhalla Rising	Clive Cussler
September 30	Black House	Stephen King and Peter Straub
October 7	Black House	Stephen King and Peter Straub
October 14	The Corrections	Jonathan Franzen
October 21	The Corrections	Jonathan Franzen
October 28	Isle of Dog	Patricia Cornwell
November 4	Midnight Bayou	Nora Roberts
November 11	The Kiss	Danielle Steel
November 18	Desecration	Tim LaHaye and Jerry B. Jenkins
November 25	Desecration	Tim LaHaye and Jerry B. Jenkins
December 2	Desecration	Tim LaHaye and Jerry B. Jenkins
December 9	Skipping Christmas	John Grisham
December 16	Skipping Christmas	John Grisham
December 23	Skipping Christmas	John Grisham
December 30	Skipping Christmas	John Grisham

== Nonfiction ==
The following list ranks the number-one best selling nonfiction books, in the hardcover nonfiction category.

Date	Book	Author
January 7	The O'Reilly Factor	Bill O'Reilly
January 14	The O'Reilly Factor	Bill O'Reilly
January 21	The O'Reilly Factor	Bill O'Reilly
January 28	An Hour Before Daylight	Jimmy Carter
February 4	An Hour Before Daylight	Jimmy Carter
February 11	An Hour Before Daylight	Jimmy Carter
February 18	Ice Bound	Jerri Nielsen with Maryanne Vollers
February 25	Ice Bound	Jerri Nielsen with Maryanne Vollers
March 4	An Hour Before Daylight	Jimmy Carter
March 11	An Hour Before Daylight	Jimmy Carter
March 18	The O'Reilly Factor	Bill O'Reilly
March 25	Longaberger	Dave Longaberger
April 1	The O'Reilly Factor	Bill O'Reilly
April 8	Seabiscuit	Laura Hillenbrand
April 15	Seabiscuit	Laura Hillenbrand
April 22	Seabiscuit	Laura Hillenbrand
April 29	Seabiscuit	Laura Hillenbrand
May 6	Seabiscuit	Laura Hillenbrand
May 13	Seabiscuit	Laura Hillenbrand
May 20	Napalm & Silly Putty	George Carlin
May 27	Foley Is Good	Mick Foley
June 3	Foley Is Good	Mick Foley
June 10	John Adams	David McCullough
June 17	John Adams	David McCullough
June 24	John Adams	David McCullough
July 1	John Adams	David McCullough
July 8	John Adams	David McCullough
July 15	John Adams	David McCullough
July 22	John Adams	David McCullough
July 29	John Adams	David McCullough
August 5	John Adams	David McCullough
August 12	John Adams	David McCullough
August 19	John Adams	David McCullough
August 26	John Adams	David McCullough
September 2	John Adams	David McCullough
September 9	The Wild Blue	Stephen Ambrose
September 16	The Wild Blue	Stephen Ambrose
September 23	The Wild Blue	Stephen Ambrose
September 30	Jack: Straight from the Gut	Jack Welch with John A. Byrne
October 7	Jack: Straight from the Gut	Jack Welch with John A. Byrne
October 14	Jack: Straight from the Gut	Jack Welch with John A. Byrne
October 21	Jack: Straight from the Gut	Jack Welch with John A. Byrne
October 28	Germs	Judith Miller, Stephen Engelberg and William Broad
November 4	Germs	Judith Miller, Stephen Engelberg and William Broad
November 11	The No Spin Zone	Bill O'Reilly
November 18	The No Spin Zone	Bill O'Reilly
November 25	The No Spin Zone	Bill O'Reilly
December 2	The No Spin Zone	Bill O'Reilly
December 9	The No Spin Zone	Bill O'Reilly
December 16	One Nation	Editors of Life Magazine
December 23	The No Spin Zone	Bill O'Reilly
December 30	The No Spin Zone	Bill O'Reilly

== See also ==
- Publishers Weekly list of bestselling novels in the United States in the 2000s
