= Lompoc Jane Doe =

Unidentified American female homicide victim discovered in 1969

- Born: c. 1944–1953
- Died: Late July or early August 1969; Near Lompoc, California, U.S. (suspected)
- Cause of death: Multiple stab wounds
- Body discovered: August 3, 1969
- Resting place: Lompoc Cemetery, California
- Known for: Unidentified homicide victim
- Height: Approximately 5 ft 2 in (157 cm)

Lompoc Jane Doe is the name given to an unidentified young woman whose body was discovered near an abandoned quarry outside Lompoc, California, on August 3, 1969. The woman, estimated to have been between 16 and 25 years old, had been stabbed multiple times and was believed to have died several days before her discovery. Despite an extensive investigation by the Santa Barbara County Sheriff's Office and subsequent public appeal, her identity and the circumstances surrounding her murder remain unresolved.

The case received renewed attention in the early 2000s after American crime novelist Sue Grafton became involved in the investigation. Grafton financed the exhumation of the victim's remains and a forensic facial reconstruction, and subsequently used the case as inspiration for her 2002 novel Q Is for Quarry.

In late 2024, the case was accepted by the DNA Doe Project, a nonprofit organization specializing in the identification of unknown deceased individuals through investigative genetic genealogy.

== Discovery ==
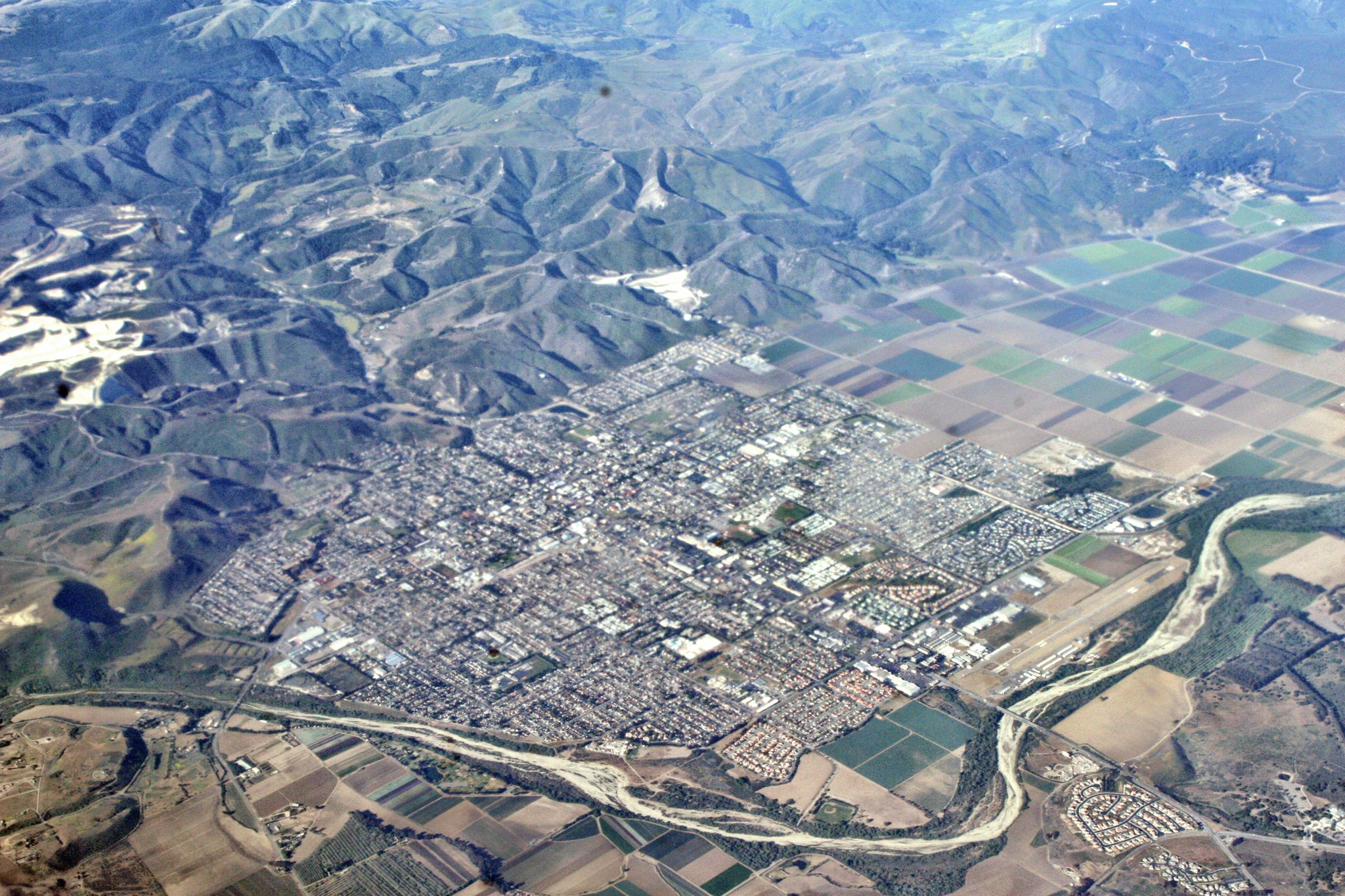
Aerial view of Lompoc; the rock mine on the left

On August 3, 1969, an off-duty sheriff's deputy and other individuals hunting wild boar discovered the body of a young woman near the former Grefco quarry road, south of Lompoc in Santa Barbara County, California.

The victim was found among a cluster of rocks several feet down an embankment, within sight of California State Route 1. Evidence at the scene suggested that her body had been dragged across dust and brush before being concealed behind the rocks. Investigators believed she had been murdered near the location where her body was discovered.

An autopsy determined that the woman had died from multiple stab wounds, including an injury to her throat. Investigators estimated that she had died several days before the discovery.

== Physical description ==
The victim was estimated to have been a white female between 16 and 25 years old. She stood approximately 5 feet 2 inches (157 cm) tall and weighed around 125 pounds (57 kg). She had shoulder-length brown hair that had been dyed reddish-blonde and was described as having blue eyes.

One of her most distinctive physical characteristics was her dental condition. She had protruding front teeth and nineteen dental fillings, believed to have been completed within the years immediately preceding her death. Investigators speculated that the unusual extent and appearance of her dental work might indicate that she had previously lived outside the United States, although this theory was never confirmed.

At the time of her discovery, she was wearing a dark-blue blouse, a black brassiere, pink underwear and white hip-hugger bell-bottom trousers decorated with a blue floral pattern featuring daisies with red centres. The trousers appeared to have been homemade. She also wore brown sandals with gold-coloured buckles and small, horseshoe-shaped earrings. Her ears were pierced, and her fingernails had been painted with silver polish.

== Investigation ==
=== Initial investigation ===
Following the discovery of the body, the Santa Barbara County Sheriff's Office began investigating the homicide and attempting to establish the victim's identity.

Dr. Robert Failing, a forensic pathologist, performed the original autopsy in 1969. Among the characteristics he documented were the victim's protruding front teeth and extensive, relatively recent dental work. Detective Bill Turner, who was involved in the original investigation, continued to follow developments in the case for several decades.

Despite the investigation, authorities were unable to establish the woman's identity. Her remains were buried in an unmarked grave at Lompoc Cemetery in 1969.

Investigators also considered whether the murder was connected to Charles Manson and his followers. In 2004, Santa Barbara County Sheriff's Lieutenant Jeff Klapakis stated that investigators had examined the possibility, noting similarities between the stabbing and the Tate–LaBianca murders, as well as reports that members of the Manson Family had been seen in the Lompoc area earlier in 1969. No connection was established.

=== Renewed investigation and exhumation ===
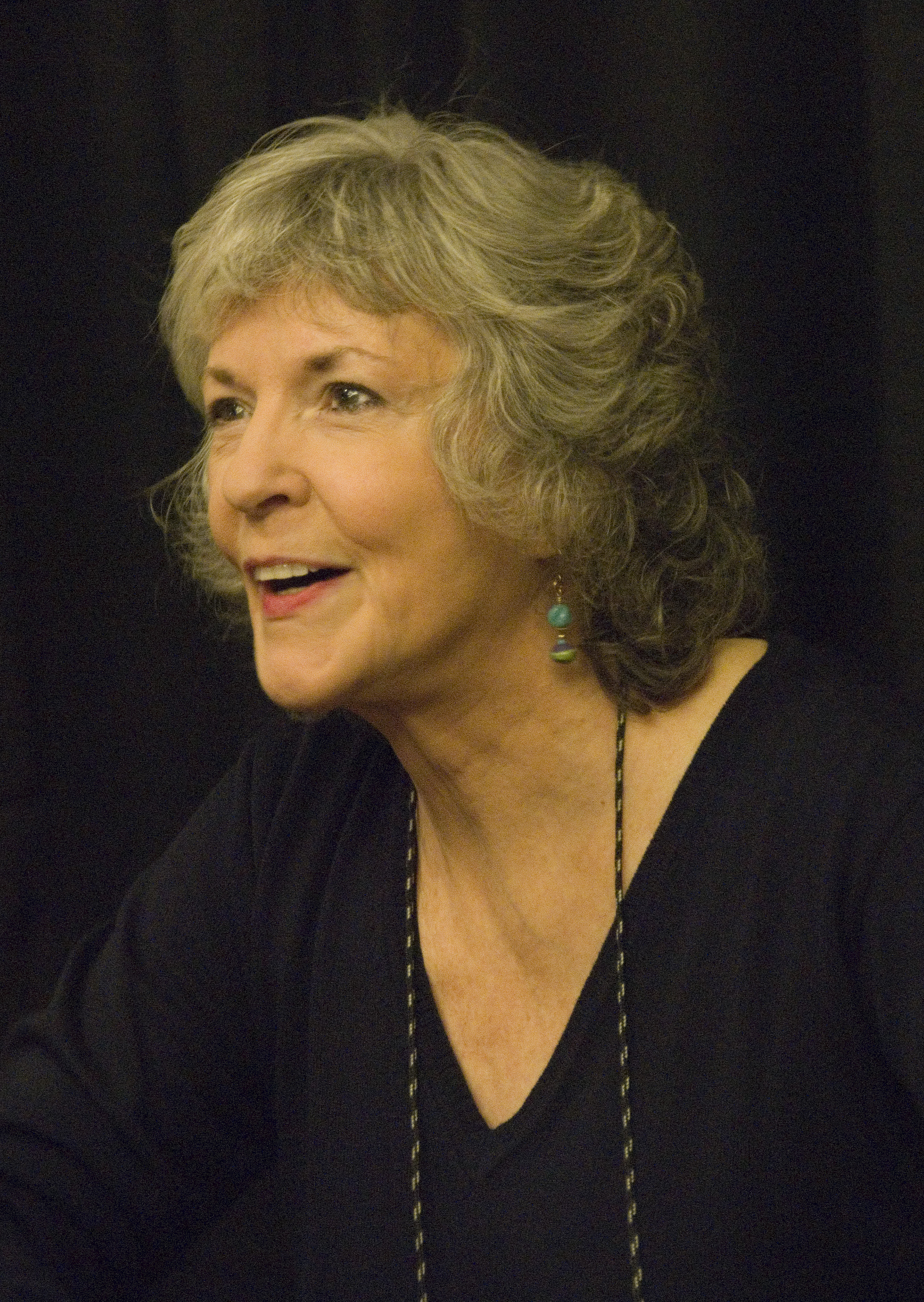
Author Sue Grafton financed the exhumation of the Lompoc Jane Doe and raised awareness of the case through her novel "Q" Is for Quarry

In the autumn of 2000, novelist Sue Grafton learned about the unidentified woman's murder during a dinner party. At the gathering, retired forensic pathologist Robert Failing, who had performed the original autopsy, described the case. Grafton became interested in the homicide while searching for material for the seventeenth novel in her Alphabet Mysteries series. She subsequently met with Santa Barbara County Sheriff's Detective Sergeant Bill Turner and Sheriff's Commander Bruce Correll. With the approval of Sheriff Jim Thomas, Grafton was permitted to examine the original investigative records, including case notes, reports and crime-scene photographs.

The renewed interest prompted discussions about exhuming the victim's remains for additional forensic examination. Grafton agreed to finance the exhumation and subsequent reburial. On July 17, 2001, the woman's remains were exhumed in the presence of Grafton, Turner and other law-enforcement personnel. Biological material was collected for DNA analysis, and the victim's skull and jaw were sent to forensic artist Betty Pat Gatliff in Oklahoma. Gatliff produced a forensic facial reconstruction of the unidentified woman, which was completed by mid-September 2001. The reconstruction was subsequently publicised in the hope that someone would recognise the victim and provide information leading to her identification.

On February 26, 2002, the woman's remains were reinterred at Lompoc Cemetery during a ceremony attended by representatives of the Sheriff's Office.

== Genetic genealogy investigation ==
=== Connection to the DNA Doe Project ===
In February 2017, genealogist Margaret Press became interested in the Lompoc Jane Doe case after reading Grafton's novel "Q" Is for Quarry. Press, who had recently retired, recognised that genetic genealogy could potentially be used to identify unidentified human remains. She contacted Grafton to discuss the possibility of applying genealogical techniques to the case. Grafton expressed interest in the proposal but died in December 2017 before further progress could be made.

Later in 2017, Press and forensic genealogist Colleen M. Fitzpatrick established the DNA Doe Project, an organization dedicated to identifying unidentified deceased individuals using forensic genetic genealogy. The Lompoc case was subsequently described by the organization as an important inspiration behind its founding.

=== DNA Doe Project involvement ===
In 2024, a private individual approached the DNA Doe Project with an offer to finance additional forensic investigation into the victim's identity. DNA Doe Project contacted the Santa Barbara County Sheriff's Office and learned that a DNA profile from the case had already been submitted to the Federal Bureau of Investigation's investigative genetic genealogy team. However, the FBI team had not yet begun genealogical research because of its existing caseload. The DNA Doe Project offered to undertake the research, and the case was formally accepted before the end of 2024, becoming the organization's 241st case.

The organization publicly listed the investigation on January 10, 2025. As of October 2026, its case profile describes the case as being in the research stage and identifies the Santa Barbara County Sheriff's Office as the investigating agency.

== In popular culture ==
=== Q Is for Quarry ===
The Lompoc Jane Doe case provided the inspiration for Sue Grafton's 2002 mystery novel "Q" Is for Quarry, the seventeenth book in her Alphabet Mysteries series featuring fictional private investigator Kinsey Millhone.

Although Grafton created fictional characters and an imagined resolution to the crime, the novel incorporated numerous details from the original investigation, including aspects of the discovery and forensic evidence. The book included an author's note describing the real unidentified woman and the efforts to establish her identity. The publication also featured Gatliff's facial reconstruction.

Grafton hoped that the novel's readership might generate information that would assist investigators. The publicity produced further leads, but none resulted in an identification.

== See also ==
- List of unsolved murders (1900–1979)
- Investigative genetic genealogy
- DNA Doe Project
