= The Lolly-Madonna War =

1969 novel by Sue Grafton

- 1969 first edition
- Author: Sue Grafton
- Language: English
- Genre: Novel
- Publisher: Peter Owen
- Publication date: 1969
- Publication place: United States
- Media type: Print (hardcover)
- Pages: 192 (first edition)
- ISBN: 978-0-7206-4920-8
- Preceded by: Keziah Dane
- Followed by: "A" Is for Alibi

The Lolly-Madonna War is a 1969 novel by American writer Sue Grafton. This is the fifth novel Grafton wrote but the second one published. A work of mainstream fiction, this novel was published by Peter Owen Publishers when Grafton was 29 years old. This is one of only two Sue Grafton novels published before her "Alphabet" series of mystery novels. The novel was originally published in the United Kingdom and never saw publication in the United States.

== Film adaptation ==
The novel was adapted into the 1973 motion picture Lolly-Madonna XXX directed by Richard C. Sarafian. The screenplay was co-written by Rodney Carr-Smith and Sue Grafton. The film stars Rod Steiger as "Laban Feather", Robert Ryan as "Pap Gutshall", Jeff Bridges as "Zack Feather", Season Hubley as "Roonie Gill", Randy Quaid as "Finch Feather", and Gary Busey as "Zeb".
