= "Q" Is for Quarry =

Novel by Sue Grafton

- First edition cover
- Author: Sue Grafton
- Language: English
- Series: Alphabet Mysteries
- Genre: Mystery fiction
- Publisher: G. P. Putnam's Sons
- Publication date: October 14, 2002
- Publication place: United States
- Media type: Print (hardcover)
- Pages: 385 first edition
- ISBN: 978-0-399-14915-3
- OCLC: 49618561
- Dewey Decimal: 813/.54 21
- LC Class: PS3557.R13 Q15 2002
- Preceded by: "P" Is for Peril
- Followed by: "R" Is for Ricochet

"Q" Is for Quarry is the 17th novel in Sue Grafton's "Alphabet" series of mystery novels and features Kinsey Millhone, a private eye based in Santa Teresa, California.

== Plot summary ==
While moving into her new office, Kinsey Millhone receives a visit from Lt. Con Dolan of the Santa Teresa Sheriff's Department. Dolan comes bearing bad news: retired STSD Detective Stacey Oliphant is dying of cancer. Oliphant is haunted by a cold case from 1969, a murder investigation wherein he and Dolan discovered the body of a teenage Jane Doe in a quarry outside Lompoc. Dolan suggests the three of them work together to solve the case in order to give Oliphant some peace of mind in his final days.

After Kinsey pursues a couple of false leads, Dolan and Oliphant suggest focusing their investigation on a career criminal named Frankie Miracle, who was arrested in Lompoc within days of the Doe murder for killing his girlfriend. They have always believed Miracle killed Doe, but were never able to prove it. Miracle's former cellmate Cedric "Pudgie" Clifton confirms that Miracle claimed to have killed a second woman in circumstances which match the Doe murder. The recently paroled Miracle denies any knowledge of the Doe crime and flatly refuses to cooperate.

STSD Sgt. Detective Joe Mandel discovers that a red Ford Mustang mentioned in the original report as possibly belonging to the killer was stolen from an auto upholsterer in Quorum, a small town near the Arizona border and suspiciously close to Miracle's own hometown. The car was recovered and sold to the owner of the shop, Ruel MacPhee, who has kept it ever since.

In Quorum, Dolan and Kinsey find the auto shop being run by Ruel MacPhee's son, Cornell. MacPhee's mother-in-law, Medora Sanders, identifies Jane Doe as Charisse Quinn, a foster child who briefly boarded with her. Sanders relates that Quinn was a troubled teen, expelled from school and sexually promiscuous. According to Sanders, Quinn ran away one night and was never seen again. Local car salesman George Baum informs Oliphant that Quinn was infatuated with Cornell MacPhee and befriended his sister Adrienne in hopes of getting close to Cornell himself. Cornell's wife Justine vehemently denies this.

Forensic reports on the Mustang reveal Pudgie Clifton's fingerprints. Oliphant and Kinsey begin an extensive but unsuccessful search for Clifton. In doing so, they learn he had dated Justine before she met Cornell. Quorum police find Clifton dead in an unfinished, abandoned apartment complex called the Tuley-Belle.

George Baum reveals that Cornell MacPhee had begun a sexual relationship with Quinn and that Adrienne had interrupted the two of them once at the Tuley-Belle. Adrienne confirms Baum's story, adding that Quinn told Cornell she was pregnant and wanted to elope with him. Kinsey drives to the Tuley-Belle to assist local deputies in finding the weapon used to kill Clifton. Once there, she sees Cornell and Justine digging up a tire iron.

In an epilogue, Kinsey explains that Justine killed Charisse Quinn for seducing Cornell, who Justine saw as a future source of financial security. Justine convinced Pudgie Clifton to steal the Mustang and dispose of Quinn's body. When Clifton told her the case had been reopened, she killed him to keep him quiet and forced her husband to dispose of the body as she had with Clifton 20 years before.

== Development of the novel ==
Though the book is a work of fiction, it is based on an unsolved homicide that occurred in Santa Barbara County, California in August 1969. A Jane Doe victim had been dumped near a quarry in Lompoc, California, and never identified. At a dinner party, Sue Grafton had a conversation with Dr. Robert Failing, who mentioned the case. He is the forensic pathologist who worked for the Coroner's Office which had retained her maxilla and mandible. The victim was never identified, and never associated with any known missing person's case. It was hoped that the additional publicity generated by the book (along with the facial reconstruction done by internationally recognized forensic sculptor Betty Gatliff, funded by Grafton), would help turn up additional leads, but so far, unsuccessfully. As of 2011, the Santa Barbara County Sheriff's Office is still hoping to find additional leads, and has the images of the facial reconstruction on their page. In January 2025, efforts to gain a DNA sample from the Lompoc Jane Doe which was suitable for investigative genetic genealogy began to be undertaken by the DNA Doe Project. Her case was moved into active genealogical research on March 11 of the same year.

== See also ==
- Lompoc Jane Doe - homicide victim that inspired the novel
