= "E" Is for Evidence =

Novel by Sue Grafton

- First edition cover
- Author: Sue Grafton
- Language: English
- Series: Alphabet Mysteries
- Genre: Mystery fiction
- Published: 1988 Henry Holt and Company
- Publication place: United States
- Media type: Print (Hardcover)
- Pages: 227 first edition
- ISBN: 978-0-8050-0459-5
- OCLC: 16901295
- Dewey Decimal: 813/.54 19
- LC Class: PS3557.R13 E2 1988
- Preceded by: "D" Is for Deadbeat
- Followed by: "F" Is for Fugitive

"E" Is for Evidence is the fifth novel in Sue Grafton's "Alphabet" series of mystery novels and features Kinsey Millhone, a private eye based in Santa Teresa, California. The premise of the book elaborates on Kinsey's personal history since it involves her second ex-husband, jazz musician and drug addict Daniel Wade, who was only briefly addressed in "C" is for Corpse.

== Plot summary ==
Kinsey Millhone finds that her bank account has been inexplicably credited with $5,000 just after Christmas. She remembers a few days ago when California Fidelity Insurance asked her to look into a fire claim at a plant in Colgate as part of their unofficial office space rental agreement. The business in question, Wood/Warren, is owned and operated by the Wood family, whom Kinsey has known on a personal level since high school. Company founder Linden Wood is dead. His son Lance now runs the company, and his four other children—Ebony, Olive, Ash and Bass—all have a stake. Ash is Kinsey's former schoolmate; and Bass was an acquaintance of her second ex-husband, Daniel Wade. Olive is married to Terry Kohler, Lance's second-in-command at the company. After a solitary Christmas, with Henry away visiting relatives and Rosie's Tavern shut down until the new year, Kinsey writes off the fire as an industrial accident. Upon submitting her report to her boss, she finds that significant papers have been removed from the file and others substituted, giving an appearance that Lance Wood has bribed Kinsey not to label the fire as arson. In the middle of protesting her innocence, the five thousand dollar credit takes on a sinister significance.

Temporarily suspended from California Fidelity, Kinsey takes up her own investigation to prove her innocence, aided (unwillingly at first) by CFI administrator Darcy. Darcy is united with Kinsey in her dislike of claims manager Andy Motycka, who is Kinsey's chief suspect in the set-up. She is at a loss and cannot imagine for whom he could be working. Kinsey reconnects with the Wood family and learns some of their dark family secrets: that Ebony, the oldest sister, wants control of the business and that Lance was practically a criminal in high school. She also learns that a former Wood/Warren employee, Hugh Case, committed suicide two years before, although the suspicious disappearance of all the lab work on Hugh's body seems to support his widow Lyda's claim that it was murder rather than suicide. Kinsey remains unconvinced by Lyda's conviction that Lance was Hugh's killer but can't seem to find any other leads. Her spirits are at a low ebb, and it's the worst possible moment for Daniel to show up (eight years after leaving without a word). Kinsey finds it hard to cope with but eventually agrees to store a guitar for him while he sorts himself out.

On her way to a new year party at Olive and Terry's home, Kinsey is almost killed when a bomb, disguised as a gift left on the doorstep, explodes. Olive is killed, and Terry is badly injured. Kinsey does her best to resist Daniel's attempts to nurse her, and her distrust is proven right when she finds out the guitar she has been storing for Daniel is bugged and that he has been reporting on her investigation to Ebony and Bass Wood. She discovers Daniel and Bass are lovers—Bass is the person for whom Daniel left her. Shortly afterwards, Kinsey finds Lyda Case's dead body in a car outside her apartment. Forcing answers from the Wood family, Kinsey learns an even darker family secret: that Lance had an incestuous affair with Olive when they were teenagers, leaving Olive emotionally and sexually scarred for the rest of her life. Kinsey's suspicions immediately jump to Terry Kohler; and when the police identify fingerprints on the car Lyda was found in as belonging to an escaped convicted bomber called Chris Emms, she realizes Terry and Emms are the same person.

Unfortunately, Emms has anticipated her solving the case and is waiting at her apartment with another bomb. Before it explodes, he explains he killed Hugh Case because Hugh had realized his true identity; and he killed Lyda because she had belatedly found Hugh's records of that. He engineered the fire at Wood/Warren and set up Kinsey (with the aid of Andy Motycka) to get revenge on Lance after Bass spilled the family incest secret to him. Kinsey manages to shoot Emms and disables him sufficiently to get out of the bathroom window just as the bomb explodes, killing Emms and destroying her garage apartment. After Daniel leaves with Bass, the only loose end is the five thousand dollars Emms put in her account; and on the advice of Lieutenant Dolan, Kinsey keeps it.

== Characters ==
- Kinsey Millhone: Private detective who investigates an insurance claim for a fire and finds herself framed for an arson fire.

== Development of the story ==
In 2005, Grafton told an interviewer that she prefers to pick a title early in the writing process because that helps to direct her storytelling. "For one book I had thought of "E" Is for Ever. I loved the play on words but I had to figure a better title. So I picked "E" Is for Evidence. If I know the title I can make sure the story I'm telling is pertinent."

== Reviews ==
- Kirkus Reviews called the book a "first class entertainment," praising its pace, characters, and charm, but noted that the plot was crucially flawed.
- Publishers Weekly wrote that the book was not up to the standards of its predecessors due to the motivations for crimes being weak; however, they felt that readers would still enjoy the series.

== Awards ==
The novel was nominated for the 1989 Anthony Award for Best Novel.
