= Keziah Dane =

1967 novel by Sue Grafton

- 1967 first edition
- Author: Sue Grafton
- Language: English
- Genre: Novel
- Publisher: The MacMillan Company
- Publication date: 1967
- Publication place: United States
- Media type: Print (Hardcover)
- Pages: 220 (first edition)
- ISBN: 978-1-151-88895-2
- Followed by: The Lolly-Madonna War

Keziah Dane is a 1967 novel by American writer Sue Grafton. A work of mainstream fiction, this novel was published by Grafton when she was 27 years old. This is one of two Sue Grafton novels published before her "Alphabet" series of mystery novels.

This is the fourth novel Grafton wrote but the first one published. Originally written under the title The Seventh Day of Keziah Dane, Grafton entered the unpublished novel in an Anglo-American Book Award contest. The novel did not win, but it drew a publication offer from a British publisher which Grafton used to get an agent who got the book an American publisher, Macmillan.

== Plot summary ==
Keziah Dane is a widow who lives "on the brink of poverty" with her children in a small Kentucky town. She lost her husband in a flood that also devastated their town. A vagrant named Web gains Keziah's trust then attempts to rape her eldest daughter. The daughter fends off the attack but kills Web in the process. The body is dumped in the flooded town and unexpected complications ensue for the Dane family.

== Critical reaction ==
Contemporary reaction was positive with featured reviews in The New York Times and Los Angeles Times, among others. Reviewer Marjorie Driscoll noted that Grafton presented her "widely varied array of characters" in a "sympathetic and understanding story" while displaying her "versatility" by "making them all very real."
