= "A" Is for Alibi =

1982 novel by Sue Grafton

- First edition cover
- Author: Sue Grafton
- Language: English
- Series: Alphabet Mysteries
- Genre: Mystery
- Publisher: Henry Holt and Company
- Publication date: April 15, 1982
- Publication place: United States
- Media type: Print Hardcover
- Pages: 274 first edition
- ISBN: 978-0-8050-1334-4
- OCLC: 7835758
- Followed by: "B" Is for Burglar

"A" Is for Alibi is the first mystery novel in Sue Grafton's "Alphabet" series, and was published by Holt, Rinehart and Winston in 1982. Featuring sleuth Kinsey Millhone, it is set in the southern California city of Santa Teresa, a stand-in Santa Barbara. She wrote the book during a divorce and admits about her husband that she "would lie in bed at night thinking of ways to kill him". The New York Times gave the book a mediocre review.

== Plot summary ==
Kinsey Millhone, a private detective, investigates the death of a prominent divorce lawyer Laurence Fife. His murder eight years earlier was blamed on his wife, Nikki Fife. Upon being released from prison, Nikki hires Kinsey to find the real murderer. In the course of the investigation, Kinsey becomes involved with Charlie Scorsoni, the late Mr. Fife's former law partner. She discovers Fife's death has been linked to a woman in Los Angeles, his law firm's accountant. Both died after taking poisonous oleander capsules, which had been substituted for allergy pills. Kinsey tracks down the accountant's parents and former boyfriend. She then goes to Las Vegas to interview Fife's former secretary, Sharon Napier, who is killed minutes before Kinsey arrives. Back in California, Kinsey is mystified that Nikki's son, Colin, recognizes Laurence's first wife, Gwen, in a photograph. Kinsey determines that Gwen was having an affair with her ex-husband at the time of his death. She accuses Gwen, who confesses. Shortly afterwards, she too is dead, killed in a hit-and-run crash.

Kinsey has solved the case she was hired to investigate; but in a plot twist, she discovers that her previous notions about the accountant's death were entirely wrong: in fact, it was Scorsoni who killed her when she discovered he was skimming dividend money from estate accounts under his management. Scorsoni used the same method that Gwen used to kill Fife, so it would be assumed the same person committed both murders. In a final confrontation, he chases Kinsey across the beach, armed with a knife. Kinsey hides in the shore line, and she is forced to remove her shoes and pants. Before Scorsoni can kill her, she shoots him dead.

A secondary storyline involves Millhone's surveillance of Marcia Threadgill, suspected of insurance fraud in a trip-and-fall case. Although Millhone believes she has successfully documented Threadgill's deception, the insurance firm that contracted Millhone to investigate Threadgill moves to pay her claim anyway, citing potential legal costs and complications, including the risk of reprisal.

== Publication history ==
The first printing of "A" Is for Alibi was 7,500 copies, with initial sales of about 6,000.

== Critical analysis ==
Grafton openly admitted that she conceived the story from her own "fantasies" of murdering her husband while going through a divorce.

The novel's style is typical hardboiled detective fiction, according to the authors of 'G' is for Grafton, who describe it as "laconic, breezy, wise-cracking". Grafton frames the narrative as a report Kinsey Millhone writes during the course of her investigation, written in the first-person narrative.

"A" is for Alibi is dedicated to author Chip Grafton, Sue Grafton's father, "who set me on this path". Chip Grafton was a municipal bond attorney in Kentucky who pursued a secondary career as a crime novelist, winning minor acclaim for four novels. He died on January 31, 1982 at age 72, four months before 'A' is for Alibi was published.

== Reviews ==
Writing when the book was released, Kirkus Reviews said this was a "shakily plotted but otherwise terrific start for a new detective series". The reviewer looked forward to the rest of the Alphabet Series, "fine dialogue, a great eye for people and places", if the author can tighten up her plots.

Looking back at the series soon after the author's death, Library Journal Reviews remarked on the slow build up to successful reviews, including a quote from its own review: "Critic Sarah Weinman notes that pseudonymous New York Times critic Newgate Callendar dismissed A Is for Alibi as 'competent enough, but not particularly original.'" Alas, LJ's reviewer was equally unenthusiastic in an April 1, 1982, review, waving the book aside as "nothing to take it out of the ordinary." Before those less enthusiastic words, they had said, "The female detective is well drawn and the plot moves at a fast clip".

== Sources ==
- Kaufman, Natalie Hevener; Kay, Carol McGinnis (1997). "G" Is for Grafton: The World of Kinsey Millhone (Hardcover ed.). Henry Holt and Company. ISBN 0-8050-5446-4.
