= "T" Is for Trespass =

Novel by Sue Grafton

- First edition cover
- Author: Sue Grafton
- Language: English
- Series: Alphabet Mysteries
- Genre: Mystery fiction
- Publisher: G.P. Putnam's Sons
- Publication date: December 4, 2007
- Publication place: United States
- Media type: Print (hardcover)
- Pages: 387 first edition
- ISBN: 978-0-399-15448-5
- OCLC: 154688709
- Preceded by: "S" Is for Silence
- Followed by: "U" Is for Undertow

"T" Is for Trespass is the 20th novel in Sue Grafton's "Alphabet" series of mystery novels and features Kinsey Millhone, a private eye based in the fictional Santa Teresa, California. Grafton drafted six possible story lines for the novel before settling on the final plot.

== Plot summary ==
Kinsey Millhone is juggling two cases at once, one involving elder abuse and the other a possible insurance fraud. The two cases alternate throughout the book, which also contains several episodes showing Kinsey's work as a process server.

=== Solana Rojas ===
Kinsey's cantankerous neighbor Gus Vronsky is injured in a fall and his niece, Melanie Oberlin, hires Solana Rojas, a private nurse, to help him while he recuperates. Melanie hires Kinsey to perform a background check on Solana. The background check shows nothing untoward, but when Kinsey visits Gus to check on his progress, her suspicions are aroused by the nurse's unusually confrontational behavior.

Concerned, Kinsey files a report with the Department of Elder Services, who find nothing wrong and urge her to drop the matter. The caseworker reveals that Solana has placed Gus under the conservatorship of a woman named Cristina Tasinato.

Kinsey restarts her background investigation in more detail. Upon revisiting Solana's prior employer, a local rehabilitation facility called Sunrise House, Kinsey discovers that "Solana" and Cristina Tasinato are the same person. Cristina stole the real Solana's identity after the two worked together at Sunrise. Cristina finds out about Kinsey's investigation and retaliates by taking out a restraining order against her.

While visiting Cristina's former residence, Kinsey meets Peggy Klein, whose late grandmother was another of Cristina's victims. They return to Gus' home, where they enlist the aid of Kinsey's landlord, Henry Pitts, to rescue Gus and take him to the hospital.

Cristina spends a couple of weeks stalking Kinsey, until Kinsey tracks her to a nearby hotel. The police arrive to arrest Cristina and she dies trying to escape.

=== Lisa Ray ===
An attorney hires Kinsey to investigate the case of Lisa Ray, a college student whose car struck another vehicle while leaving campus. The female passenger in the other car, Gladys Frederickson, suffered extensive injuries and she and her husband Millard are suing Lisa and her insurance company.

Lisa tells Kinsey that a man with white hair came to comfort her at the scene of the accident. She claims Gladys is faking the injury. Kinsey tracks down the witness, an ex-con named Melvin Downs, who informs her that he saw Frederickson's car accelerate just before hitting Lisa. When Kinsey returns to take a full statement, she finds that Downs has disappeared.

An accident reconstruction specialist determines that Gladys Frederickson's injuries, while real, could not have been a result of the collision. Kinsey canvasses the Fredericksons' neighbors. She meets an old woman named Letty Bowers, who saw Gladys Frederickson fall off a ladder while trying to clean the gutters at her home. Kinsey realizes that the Fredericksons, who lacked homeowner's insurance, set up the car accident in hopes of defrauding the insurance company into paying Gladys' hospital bills. The Fredericksons drop the lawsuit.

== Reception ==
A reviewer for Publishers Weekly expressed admiration for the author stating: "Grafton's mastery of dialogue and her portrayal of the limits of good intentions make this one of the series' high points." While Kirkus predicted that the novel "will bring shivers to every reader."
