= Lolly-Madonna XXX =

1973 film by Richard C. Sarafian

- Alternative movie poster
- Directed by: Richard C. Sarafian
- Screenplay by: Rodney Carr-Smith; Sue Grafton
- Based on: The Lolly-Madonna War; 1969 novel by Sue Grafton
- Produced by: Rodney Carr-Smith
- Starring: Rod Steiger; Robert Ryan; Jeff Bridges; Scott Wilson; Season Hubley
- Cinematography: Philip H. Lathrop
- Edited by: Tom Rolf
- Music by: Fred Myrow
- Distributed by: Metro-Goldwyn-Mayer
- Release date: February 21, 1973 (US)
- Running time: 103 minutes
- Country: United States
- Language: English

Lolly-Madonna XXX (a.k.a. The Lolly-Madonna War) is a 1973 American Southern Gothic drama film directed by Richard C. Sarafian. The film was written by Rodney Carr-Smith and Sue Grafton, who adapted their screenplay from the latter's 1969 novel The Lolly-Madonna War.

The film follows two East Tennessee hillbilly families involved in a feud over a piece of pastureland between their family farms, and a young woman (Season Hubley) who is kidnapped by one of the families after she is mistaken for being a member of the other. She in turn begins to develop a romantic interest with a widowed son (Jeff Bridges) of the family who tries to end the feud.

== Plot ==
Two families in rural Tennessee, headed by patriarchs Laban Feather and Pap Gutshall are at odds with each other. The sons of the two families play harmless tricks on each other but soon the Feather boys decide to kidnap a girl, escalating the rivalry. She turns out to be innocent bystander Roonie Gill, not the made-up Gutshall girlfriend "Lolly Madonna" that the Gutshall clan had invented to get the Feathers away from their still. As events escalate, Zack Feather and Roonie fall in love and try to bring the others to their senses, but to no avail. One family busts up another's moonshine still; and in retaliation, the sons of that family rape the daughter of the other. After the feud results in a fiery confrontation in a meadow, where one of the Feather boys is fatally wounded and the mother of the Gutshall kin is shot to death, the two families regroup in order to gear up for a final deadly confrontation. With the exception of Sister E Gutshall, who packs a suitcase and leaves home, the participants engage in battle at the Feather homestead. In the end, all combatants die.

== Cast ==
- Rod Steiger as Laban Feather
- Robert Ryan as Pap Gutshall
- Jeff Bridges as Zack Feather
- Gary Busey as Zeb Gutshall
- Katherine Squire as Chickie Feather
- Season Hubley as Roonie Gill/Lolly Madonna
- Ed Lauter as Hawk Feather
- Paul Koslo as Villum Gutshall
- Scott Wilson as Thrush Feather
- Kiel Martin as Ludie Gutshall
- Randy Quaid as Finch Feather
- Joan Goodfellow as Sister E Gutshall
- Timothy Scott as Skylar Feather
- Tresa Hughes as Elspeth Gutshall
- Kathy Watts as Lyda Jo Gutshall Feather

== Production ==
Filming took place on location in and around Maynardville, Tennessee during the summer of 1972. A family farm in the Little Valley area of Union County, Tennessee was used as the main locale for the Feather and Gutshall residences.

== Critical reception ==
The film had a mixed reception from the critics. Vincent Canby of The New York Times wrote:

Lolly-Madonna XXX is a disaster, but I can't tell whether it's because hillbillies make rotten metaphors or because Richard C. Sarafian has made a rotten movie.

Variety stated:

Sue Grafton's novel The Lolly-Madonna War, has been handsomely and sensitively filmed. Excellent performances abound by older and younger players in a mountain-country clan feud story which mixes extraordinary human compassion with raw but discreet violence.

== See also ==
- List of American films of 1973
