= "R" Is for Ricochet =

Novel by Sue Grafton

- First edition cover
- Author: Sue Grafton
- Language: English
- Series: Alphabet Mysteries
- Genre: Mystery fiction
- Publisher: G. P. Putnam's Sons
- Publication date: July 12, 2004
- Publication place: United States
- Media type: Print (hardcover)
- Pages: 352 first edition
- ISBN: 978-0-399-15228-3
- OCLC: 54693097
- Dewey Decimal: 813/.54 22
- LC Class: PS3557.R13 R15 2004
- Preceded by: "Q" Is for Quarry
- Followed by: "S" Is for Silence

"R" Is for Ricochet is the 18th novel in Sue Grafton's "Alphabet" series of mystery novels and features Kinsey Millhone, a private eye based in Santa Teresa, California.

The daughter of Nord Lafferty will be brought home from prison by Kinsey Millhone, who also offers to help her adjust to life outside of prison. Seems straightforward enough, but Reba Lafferty has several difficulties.

Meanwhile, Kinsey's landlord Henry, unmarried for all his life, is considering a female companion. Kinsey has a lover, too.

== Plot summary ==
Kinsey Millhone agrees to escort Reba, the daughter of Nord Lafferty, out of prison to the Lafferty mansion and watch over Reba until she is settled into her life out of prison. Reba was serving a sentence for embezzlement, though she had not embezzled funds; her boss had spent the funds on bribing municipal officials for the construction of a shopping mall with office space in the center of Santa Teresa. Lieutenant Cheney Phillips encounters Kinsey at the office of the probation officer for Reba Lafferty, as he is the local investigator in a multi-agency operation to arrest Reba's boss, Alan Beckwith. Several federal agencies are pursuing him for laundering funds for a Colombian drug dealer.

Reba pled guilty because she was in love with Beckwith, a married man. While Reba was in prison, Beckwith slept with her replacement in the office. Kinsey has known Cheney for a couple of years; now, she is smitten with him. For this arrest, he and the whole team of investigators want Reba to provide evidence of the money laundering, an inside witness for their case. They decide that Kinsey, now building rapport with Reba, should ask her to take this on. Unwillingly, Kinsey does so.

Kinsey's landlord, Henry, meets with Mattie Halstead, a woman he met on a cruise ship trip taken with his older brothers. His brothers interfere with each visit between the two, which is upsetting the normally calm Henry and upsetting Kinsey, who thinks she might be good company for Henry.

Reba goes to a support group meeting for alcoholism but, within days, is drinking again. She had stopped smoking in prison and takes up smoking again. Even with Kinsey's company, Reba cannot handle freedom. As she realizes that Beckwith has no intention of keeping the promises he made to her, Reba makes plans to get back at him. First she tells her former colleague and comptroller for Beckwith's company, Marty, about the federal investigation, recommending he leave the country. He acts slowly, not sure whether to believe her.

Touring the new offices in the development completed while Reba was in prison, Reba and Kinsey find the room where Beckwith bundles cash in small bills to carry out to Panama, where he owns a bank. He either flies on his own jet or sails his own ship to carry the heavy bundles without close examination by customs. Reba at first thinks the cash belongs to Beckwith and steals a packet worth $25,000. Beckwith learns of the theft when his Colombian dealer tells him the cash is short. Reba then understands from Kinsey that the cash was being laundered for the Colombian. Reba goes to Reno to meet her friend from prison, Misty Raine. Besides her profession as a stripper, Misty makes false passports and driver licenses; she makes a set for Marty. Reba has already seen that Beckwith had a set of false papers for his trip to leave the country, as he is aware of the pressure building from the federal investigation.

Kinsey has some pleasant evenings with Cheney. She buys more flattering clothes with Reba to look nicer for Cheney; and Cheney cuts her hair to be more stylish, a talent of his.

Kinsey pursues Misty in Reno when Reba disappears from her family home. Her hunch is good, and she finds Reba with Misty. Reba agrees to drive back to California with Kinsey, aware that she has broken the terms of her parole by leaving the state. The two meet Marty in a hotel in Beverly Hills. Abruptly, a couple of goons grab Marty in the hotel lobby where they talk and beat him up. Reba tells the hotel they need help and she flees, while Kinsey pursues Marty in hopes of helping him. Kinsey hits one goon hard with a chair, but she is then knocked unconscious. She revives in the presence of Beckwith and his goons, solving the question of who sent those men to beat up the comptroller. Reba lets Beckwith know that she has the computer and the data discs that he uses to back up his business affairs, including the money laundering. Beckwith threatens Kinsey so that Reba will bring the computer and the discs to him. She does so. In the office, Marty lies dead. Beckwith claims the man had a heart attack; the beating did not kill him. Presented with the computer and the discs, Beckwith carefully pours a strong acid over them so they cannot be read. Reba reveals that she switched the computers with Marty's aid. Behind Beckwith, the team of police, led by Cheney Phillips, arrives with guns out.

Reba feels she does better in prison, where she cannot do wrong, which is where her theft of the cash lands her. The federal case against Beckwith is strong, and he is convicted. Kinsey is optimistic about her and Cheney and remarks how sometimes, she feels she is an actor in someone else's story.

== Characters ==
- Kinsey Millhone: Private detective hired by Nord Lafferty to bring his daughter home from prison.
- Nord Lafferty: Wealthy widower in his 80s whose much loved daughter has not settled down in her adult life.
- Reba Lafferty: 32-year-old daughter of Nord, who is released from her prison term as the story opens. She was in prison for embezzling from her employer, though she had not done that; her employer committed financial crimes. She had been in love with her boss. She becomes friends with Kinsey.
- Lucinda: Friend of Nord Lafferty, who does not get along with Reba. She is rather forceful, and listens in on Nord's phone calls.
- Cheney Phillips: Santa Teresa police investigator who is also interested in Reba Lafferty, in the case to arrest her boss. He becomes Kinsey's lover.
- Misty Raine: Prisoner with Reba who becomes Reba's friend; she is a stripper who relocates to Reno when her parole in California is ended.
- Henry Pitt: Landlord of Kinsey Millhone. He returned from a cruise ship trip with his brothers and sister; he is the youngest of them. He considers having a woman in his life, at age 87.
- William Pitt: One brother of Henry, who is married to Rosie. William calls their brother Lewis to come to Santa Teresa from his home in Michigan, in hopes that competition will provoke Henry to pursue a woman from San Francisco, met on the cruise.
- Lewis Pitt: Brother of Henry and William, who lives in Michigan and comes to Santa Teresa.
- Mattie Halstead: Widowed painter from San Francisco who was on the cruise with the Pitt brothers.
- Marty Blumworth: Comptroller at Beckwith's company, former colleague of Reba.
- Onni: Colleague of Reba when she worked; Onni took Reba's job, and her position as lover to the boss.
- Alan Beckwith: Former boss and lover of Reba Lafferty. He is a real estate developer who became a money launderer for a drug dealer south of the border. He set Reba up to do the time for his crime. He is a married man, nicknamed Beck.
- Rosie: Owner and cook for the restaurant closest to Kinsey's apartment. She is married to William, and watches over Kinsey, giving her Hungarian meals.
- Ms. Priscilla Holloway: Parole officer for Reba Lafferty.
- Vince Turner: Investigator with FBI for financial crimes. who has been watching Beckwith for a while.

== Reviews ==
Kirkus Reviews considers the title for this novel might have been R is for Romance, as Kinsey finds romance, her landlord considers a woman he met on a cruise ship, and Kinsey's client was in prison for her boss, with whom she had been in love. The criminal plot arises from the boss of Kinsey's client. In summary, "Kinsey's frantic attempts to keep her balance on the tightrope between a pair of lovers scheming against each other, and her own latest stab at romance, will have fans purring contentedly."
