= "I" Is for Innocent =

Novel by Sue Grafton

- First edition cover
- Author: Sue Grafton
- Language: English
- Series: Alphabet Mysteries
- Genre: Mystery fiction
- Published: 1992 Henry Holt and Company
- Publication place: United States
- Media type: Print (Hardcover)
- Pages: 286 first edition
- ISBN: 978-0-8050-1085-5
- OCLC: 25009299
- Dewey Decimal: 813/.54 20
- LC Class: PS3557.R13 I2 1992
- Preceded by: "H" Is for Homicide
- Followed by: "J" Is for Judgment

"I" Is for Innocent is the ninth novel in Sue Grafton's "Alphabet" series of mystery novels and features Kinsey Millhone, a private eye based in Santa Teresa, California.

== Plot summary ==
After being unceremoniously fired by California Fidelity Insurance, Kinsey has found herself new office space with her attorney, Lonnie Kingman. Lonnie has a case with which he wants Kinsey's help. Six years earlier, David Barney was acquitted of killing his estranged wife, talented but insecure society house-designer Isabelle Barney, by shooting her dead through the spy hole of her front door. David's desperation to rebuild the marriage after the split netted him an injunction for harassment; so, he was the obvious suspect—particularly since he inherited Isabelle's multimillion-dollar business—but the prosecution could not make it stick. Now Isabelle's previous husband, Kenneth Voigt, is trying again in the civil courts in an attempt to secure the fortune for his and Isabelle's daughter Shelby; and Lonnie needs some evidence. The previous PI on the case, Morley Shine, has just died of a heart attack. Lonnie asks Kinsey to step in.

Kinsey agrees and, knowing Morley of old, is surprised to find his files in a mess, with crucial witness statements missing. One new witness has come forward: Curtis MacIntyre, a habitual jailbird who shared a cell with Barney for a night and claims that Barney confessed to his guilt just after the acquittal. Kinsey is very doubtful of this story, especially when she finds out Curtis was in custody on another matter on the date in question. In trying to fill in the other blanks, she uncovers more evidence in Barney's favor than against him, not least that Barney appears to have a cast-iron alibi; he was the victim of a hit and run whilst out jogging at the time of the murder some miles away. Kinsey tracks down both the driver—Tippy, the daughter of Isabelle's best friend Rhe Parsons—and a witness who can swear that she knocked down Barney.

Kinsey also finds out that Tippy, drunk and in her father's pick-up truck, was the perpetrator of a previous and fatal hit-and-run on the same night, the victim being an elderly man named Noah McKell. Kinsey realizes Morley was on the same track and begins to have suspicions about his death. She eventually establishes that Morley was poisoned by a pastry left at his office, a pastry made with lethal mushrooms. She also finds out that Kenneth Voigt has been paying Curtis 'expense money' for years, which casts further doubt on his testimony. Curtis comes up with an alternative story: according to him, the confession was actually made some time after the acquittal during a drunken evening at Barney's home. This sounds even more unlikely to Kinsey's skeptical ears. She begins to suspect that someone else from Isabelle's immediate circle might be the guilty party—Isabelle's sister Simone, Ken Voigt's new wife Francesca, or Isabelle's former business partner Peter Weidmann and/or his wife Yolanda.

Meanwhile, at home, Kinsey's octogenarian landlord, Henry Pitts, is entertaining his hypochondriac elder brother William. Both Henry and Kinsey are astonished to find romance beginning to bloom between William and Rosie. Rosie is the proprietor of Kinsey's local Hungarian tavern, which has recently been taken over as a favorite haunt by some local sports fans. Rosie charms William with her acceptance of his imagined illnesses.

Back on the case, Kinsey has a sudden flash of curiosity after looking at the time gap between Tippy's killing Mr. McKell and knocking down Barney. Tippy admits that panic-stricken after the first accident, she went to confess what she had done to her 'aunt' Isabelle but did not get an answer at the door. Kinsey's train of thought is interrupted by a call from Curtis, asking her to meet him at the bird refuge. He sounds terrified, and Kinsey suspects he has been taken hostage. She arranges for Jonah, her ex-boyfriend cop, to provide back-up and goes to the office to pick up her gun on the way. Upon arriving at the office, she sees that a light is on and assumes it is Lonnie. After retrieving her gun, she finds that all the lights are off, and in the dark, someone begins to shoot at her. Kinsey returns fire and realises Barney's alibi is worthless: having just killed Isabelle, he could have hitched a ride on Tippy's pick-up and then rolled off it later at an appropriate time in front of witnesses, to establish his alibi miles away. Barney has anticipated that she would retrieve her gun from the office and is the one shooting at her, having killed Curtis in the office after he called Kinsey. They play a cat-and-mouse version of Russian roulette with their respective guns until Kinsey, in possession of a gun with an extra round in the chamber, emerges victorious, having shot and killed Barney.

== Reviews ==
Publishers Weekly wrote "[t]here's much to enjoy" and Kirkus Reviews agreed by saying "another winner for Grafton."
