= "O" Is for Outlaw =

Novel by Sue Grafton

- First edition cover
- Author: Sue Grafton
- Language: English
- Series: Alphabet Mysteries
- Genre: Mystery fiction
- Published: 1999 Henry Holt and Company
- Publication place: United States
- Media type: Print (Hardcover)
- Pages: 336
- ISBN: 978-0-8050-5955-7
- OCLC: 41049444
- Dewey Decimal: 813/.54 21
- LC Class: PS3557.R13 O2 1999
- Preceded by: "N" Is for Noose
- Followed by: "P" Is for Peril

"O" Is for Outlaw is the 15th novel in Sue Grafton's "Alphabet" series of mystery novels and features Kinsey Millhone, a private eye based in Santa Teresa, California.

The novel's plot has its roots in the Vietnam War, and features information about Kinsey's previously unnamed first husband, Mickey, and their brief marriage 14 years before. There is no interaction between them in the story because Mickey is in a coma throughout the novel's action.

== Plot summary ==
Kinsey's curiosity is roused when she receives a call from a man who has bought some of her possessions at an auction of defaulted storage locker items. She recognizes the box as stuff which she left in the possession of her former husband, Michael Magruder – whom she met and married during her time on the Santa Teresa Police Force at the age of 21. She walked out after eight months in 1972. Mickey had asked her to give him a false alibi when he was accused of violence against a recently returned Vietnam veteran Benny Quintero, who later died. Kinsey refused to lie, assuming his guilt, and left him.

As well as high school and police academy memories, she finds in the box a letter written to her 14 years before, shortly after she left Mickey, which never reached her. It is from Dixie Hightower, barmaid at an old haunt from that era called the Honky-Tonk, saying that Mickey was with her the night he was accused of killing Benny. While shocked to find out her husband was cheating, Kinsey realises she did Mickey an injustice thinking he killed Benny and sets out to find out what has happened to him. The trail leads her to Shack, a former colleague of Mickey's, and to Tim Litenberg, the son of another colleague, who is running the Honky-Tonk, as well as to Dixie herself, living in new-found luxury with her Vietnam vet husband Eric. Kinsey finds out Mickey had been frequenting the Honky-Tonk and is suspicious of his motives, sensing that he had uncovered some sort of illegal activity. She also contacts Mark Bethel, Mickey's lawyer on the Quintero manslaughter charge, another veteran now running for political office.

Two LAPD officers shock Kinsey with the news that Mickey is in a coma, having been shot with a gun registered to her, a present from Mickey she abandoned along with him. She is disconcerted to find this puts her high on the suspect list, especially since her assurances that she hasn't spoken to Mickey in years are belied by a record of a 30-minute call from Mickey's number to her apartment in recent weeks. Illegally breaking into Mickey's apartment in search of answers, Kinsey finds a stash of weapons, false IDs, and evidence of a trip Mickey made to Louisville, Kentucky, but her search is interrupted by a biker called Carlin Duffy, looking for Mickey, and who has been a frequent visitor in recent months according to Mickey's neighbor Wary Beason. Duffy, a habitual criminal, turns out to be Benny Quintero's half brother, and like his brother, hails originally from Louisville. Clearly he and Mickey shared an interest in finding the truth about Benny's death. From Duffy, Kinsey learns that Mickey was interested in Benny's connections to a young Louisville journalist called Duncan Oaks, who was killed in Vietnam. Benny had Duncan's press pass and dog tags, which Duffy passed to Mickey, and which Kinsey assumes have been stolen from Mickey's apartment, though she later find she has them herself, sewn into a jacket of Mickey's she took from the apartment as a souvenir.

Kinsey follows Mickey's trail to Louisville. She discovers that Oaks was injured in Vietnam but disappeared in transit for medical treatment, and also that he was a classmate of Mark Bethel's wife Laddie. She deduces that Duncan and Laddie had some sort of affair, giving Mark Bethel a motive for Duncan's disappearance in Vietnam. Back in Santa Teresa, the LAPD detectives reappear and confirm they have traced Bethel's fingerprints in Mickey's apartment, searching for the missing press pass, and suspect him of shooting Mickey. They compare notes and conclude that Bethel must have pushed Oaks out of the medical helicopter, witnessed by Benny Quintero. When Quintero headed for California after the war and presumably tried to blackmail Bethel, Bethel killed him and set Mickey up to take the rap. Years later, when Mickey finally uncovered the truth, Bethel shot him, implicating Kinsey.

Kinsey is reluctantly persuaded by the detectives to attempt to trap Bethel into a confession, an operation which goes badly wrong, and she ends up a target. However Duffy, now understanding Bethel to be the one responsible for his brother's death, decapitates Bethel with a digger, saving Kinsey. Meanwhile, Kinsey has uncovered the truth at the Honky-Tonk: it is being used to manufacture fake IDs, as Mickey had discovered. She reports the scam, and having exonerated Mickey on all fronts, is with him when he dies without regaining consciousness.

== Characters ==
- Kinsey Millhone: Private investigator who decides to follow up the story of her first husband, who she left after eight months of marriage because she thought he asked her to do something illegal.
