= "Y" Is for Yesterday =

2017 mystery novel by Sue Grafton

- First edition cover
- Author: Sue Grafton
- Language: English
- Series: Alphabet Mysteries
- Genre: Mystery fiction
- Publisher: G. P. Putnam's Sons
- Publication date: August 22, 2017
- Publication place: United States
- Media type: Print (Hardcover)
- Pages: 496 first edition
- ISBN: 978-0-399-16385-2
- Preceded by: "X"

"Y" Is for Yesterday is the twenty-fifth and final novel in the "Alphabet" series of mystery novels by Sue Grafton. Grafton intended to write a Z novel, but she died before she was able to do so. It features Kinsey Millhone, a private detective based in the fictional city of Santa Teresa, California.

The novel, set in 1989, finds Kinsey getting pulled into a decade-old case involving a sexual assault at an elite private school. The novel, published by G. P. Putnam's Sons, was released in the United States on August 22, 2017.

== Plot summary ==
In 1979 Iris Lehmann steals a test to help her best friend, Poppy Earl, a fellow student at a private high school in Santa Teresa. In the same year four teenage boys from the school sexually assault a classmate and film the attack. When the tape goes missing, the suspected thief, a classmate, is murdered. In the investigation that follows, one student turns state's evidence and two of their peers are convicted.

Fast-forward to 1989 and one of the perpetrators, Fritz McCabe, is released from prison. McCabe's parents receive a copy of the attack that was filmed, along with a ransom demand. The McCabe family calls Kinsey Millhone for help.

In an interview with NPR on August 20, 2017, Grafton stated the basis of the book was an amalgamation of two actual events: "The origin was a case that happened in Santa Barbara, where a kid was picked up because his brother owed $1,500 to a drug dealer. And eventually, he was shot and killed up in the mountains. Second part of the plot was from a case down in Orange County, where some kids –always kids– assaulted a girl and filmed it and then circulated this bunch of photographs, which she knew nothing about until somebody told her."

== Publication history ==
Y Is for Yesterday by Sue Grafton was published on 22 August 2017 by Marian Wood Books/Putnam, an imprint of Penguin Publishing Group, a division of Penguin Random House LLC.

== Reviews ==
On August 30, 2017, "Y" Is for Yesterday topped USA Today's best-seller list. On September 1, 2017, it topped The New York Times Best Seller list and was later placed on its Fiction Best Sellers of 2017 list. Publishers Weekly reviewed the book with the following blurb: "Grafton once again proves herself a superb storyteller."
