= "L" Is for Lawless =

Novel by Sue Grafton

- First edition cover
- Author: Sue Grafton
- Language: English
- Series: Alphabet Mysteries
- Genre: Mystery fiction
- Published: 1995 Henry Holt and Company
- Publication place: United States
- Media type: Print (Hardcover)
- Pages: 290 first edition
- ISBN: 978-0-8050-1937-7
- OCLC: 32469644
- Dewey Decimal: 813/.54 20
- LC Class: PS3557.R13 L2 1995
- Preceded by: "K" Is for Killer
- Followed by: "M" Is for Malice

"L" Is for Lawless is the 12th novel in Sue Grafton's "Alphabet" series of mystery novels and features Kinsey Millhone, a private eye based in Santa Teresa, California.

== Plot summary ==
Kinsey is asked by her landlord Henry Pitts to help out Bucky, the grandson of their recently deceased neighbor Johnny Lee. At the same time, Henry's family is in town for the marriage of his brother William to Rosie, the local bar owner. Bucky is trying to ensure his grandfather has a military burial. Ray Rawson and Gilbert Hays, old acquaintances of Johnny Lee, turn up unexpectedly and are interested in the meager contents of Johnny's garage apartment. The two are at cross-purposes, seeking the proceeds of a bank robbery they committed together with Johnny forty years ago. Gilbert, a violent psychopath, pursues Ray, Kinsey and Laura Huckaby (Ray's daughter and Gilbert's common-law wife) from Santa Teresa to Dallas, TX to Louisville, KY, in search of the money buried in a secret location by Johnny before his death. Catching up with them in Louisville, Gilbert takes Laura hostage to force Ray and Kinsey to piece together Johnny's clues and find the stash. Gilbert, intending to double-cross Ray after it is found, finds himself double-crossed by Ray, who had surreptitiously disabled his firearm. Shooting Gilbert dead to avenge all the deaths he is responsible for, including their associates from the heist, Ray escapes into hiding with Laura after she knocks Kinsey unconscious to keep her from following them.

A subplot concerns Kinsey's cousin Tasha reaching out to her in the hope of having a family reunion at Thanksgiving. Kinsey initially rebuffs her, but decides to ask her for assistance at the end of the book, when she is stuck in Louisville with no funds and no means of returning to Santa Teresa. Luckily she makes it home in time for the wedding of William and Rosie.

== Characters ==
- Kinsey Millhone: Private investigator is hired to investigate the life and death of her late neighbor.

== Publication history ==
This novel entered the New York Times list of best sellers for hardcover fiction at No. 1.
