= "N" Is for Noose =

Novel by Sue Grafton

- First edition cover
- Author: Sue Grafton
- Language: English
- Series: Alphabet Mysteries
- Genre: Mystery fiction
- Publisher: Henry Holt and Company
- Publication date: 1998
- Publication place: United States
- Media type: Print (Hardcover)
- Pages: 289 first edition
- ISBN: 978-0-8050-3650-3
- OCLC: 38024221
- Dewey Decimal: 813/.54 21
- LC Class: PS3557.R13 N2 1998
- Preceded by: "M" Is for Malice
- Followed by: "O" Is for Outlaw

"N" Is for Noose is the 14th novel in Sue Grafton's "Alphabet" series of mystery novels and features Kinsey Millhone, a private eye based in Santa Teresa, California, although much of this novel's action takes place elsewhere in California.

The novel was a New York Times best-seller.

== Plot summary ==
The story takes place mainly in the small-town mountain community of Nota Lake, California, where Kinsey has inherited a client named Selma Newquist from her periodic boyfriend Robert Dietz. Selma's brief is vague: she fears her husband Tom, an officer who died of a heart attack a few weeks before, who had something on his mind at the time of his death; and she wants Kinsey to find out what it was.

With very little to go on, Kinsey finds the residents of the insular community are not forthcoming. She finds Tom was held in high respect, while reactions to Selma range from tolerance for Tom's sake to downright dislike. Tom's colleagues in the sheriff's department, including Tom's partner Rafer LaMott and brother Macon Newquist, close ranks around his memory. Their respective wives, as well as Selma's 25-year-old son by her first marriage, Brant, are more helpful, as is California Highway Patrol officer James Tennyson, who found Tom's body. A search of Tom's home office reveals nothing more than some doodling and a list of phone numbers; but it seems someone is worried about what Kinsey might find when she is first threatened by a masked driver, then attacked in her hotel cabin.

Retreating to Santa Teresa, Kinsey finds Tom was interested in the case of a petty criminal, Alfie Toth, whom he had traced to a hotel in Santa Teresa before Toth died in what might have been a murder or a bizarre suicide. Toth's unusual death has curious similarities to that of a prison associate of his, career-criminal Percival "Pinkie" Ritter, who had died five years earlier, but whose body was discovered only shortly before Toth was killed.

Kinsey traces local sheriff's department officer Colleen Sellers, who informs Kinsey that Tom was suspicious that someone close to him was responsible for the deaths of both Toth and Ritter. When she also finds out that one of Ritter's daughters, Margaret, worked for Tom at the sheriff's department, Kinsey returns to Nota Lake to wrap up the case.

Now enduring open hostility in the town and unsure whom she can trust, Kinsey discovers that Rafer's daughter Barrett has had Tom's missing field notes since his death. Kinsey cracks the coded notes and realizes that the threat comes not from one of Tom's colleagues, but his stepson, Brant, who had himself been sexually abused by Ritter, killed him in retaliation and then killed witness Toth. It was the realization that Brant had committed murder and that Brant had found Toth through him, that was causing Tom's anguish before his death. Despite being unwittingly drugged by Brant in a final showdown, Kinsey subdues him, much to Selma's horror.

== Reviews ==
Richard Lipez, writing for The Washington Post, gave the book a generally favorable review, complimenting Grafton's portrayal of an insular small town which protects its own secrets.

Publishers Weekly criticized the extensive use of coincidence, chaotic climax, and weak plot, but admitted that the novel would nonetheless please fans of the series.
