= "M" Is for Malice =

Novel by Sue Grafton

- First edition cover
- Author: Sue Grafton
- Language: English
- Series: Alphabet Mysteries
- Genre: Mystery fiction
- Publisher: Henry Holt and Company
- Publication date: 1996
- Publication place: United States
- Media type: Print [Hardcover)
- Pages: 300
- ISBN: 978-0-8050-3637-4
- OCLC: 35222991
- LC Class: PS3557.R13 M13 1996
- Preceded by: "L" Is for Lawless
- Followed by: "N" Is for Noose

"M" Is for Malice is the 13th novel in Sue Grafton's "Alphabet" series of mystery novels and features Kinsey Millhone, a private eye based in Santa Teresa, California. The novel is set in 1986.

== Plot summary ==
In January 1986, Tasha Howard hires her cousin Kinsey Millhone to find an heir of the wealthy Malek family. When patriarch Bader Malek died, everyone assumed his $40 million estate would be split between his sons: Donovan, who runs the Malek construction empire; Bennet, a would-be entrepreneur; and Jack, a playboy. However, the will also names second son Guy, the black sheep of the family who left home 18 years ago and whom the family has not seen or heard from since. His unlikeable brothers do not want him back in their lives, nor do they want his taking a cut of the inherited millions. Kinsey sympathizes with the story of Guy's exile from his family, as she struggles to deal with her own family troubles.

With illicit help from Darcy Pascoe, a friend at California Fidelity Insurance, Kinsey tracks Guy to the small town of Marcella near Santa Teresa. After being rescued by local pastor Peter Antle and his wife Winnie, Guy has become a devout Christian and turned his life around. Kinsey finds him the nicest of the Malek brothers. Despite Kinsey's warnings, Guy agrees to return to his childhood home. Ugly family scenes ensue. Kinsey's worst fears for Guy are exceeded when he is found brutally bludgeoned to death at the family home. Feeling guilty for his death, Kinsey tries to find his killer.

At the same time, Kinsey resumes her relationship with Robert Dietz, a private investigator ex, and Dietz helps her with the case.

Initial physical evidence implicates Jack Malek in Guy's murder; and his attorney, Lonnie Kingman, hires Kinsey to investigate further for Jack's defense. Kinsey believes the crime's motive lies in the past but can't reconcile Guy's misdemeanors with the character of the man she knew. She decides Guy was a scapegoat for crimes he didn't commit: for example, Guy supposedly swindled widow Mrs. Maddison out of a fortune in valuable historical documents, alongside getting daughter Patti pregnant. Kinsey discovers that Bennet and his university friend Paul Trasatti completed the crime under the name Maxwell Outhwaite. She also connects the name to the murder to the Maddison family; but since Patty Maddison's mother, her sister Claire, and other family have died, this appears to be a frustrating dead end.

Dietz discovers that the story of Claire's death has been faked. Meanwhile, Enid reports that Myrna has disappeared from the Malek home in circumstances suggestive of foul play. Kinsey realizes that Myrna is actually Claire, having bided her time to get revenge on the Malek family and Guy in particular. Claire tries to escape on foot; but Kinsey catches her and confronts her with her crime against Guy, the blameless brother. After confessing to destroying the will that disinherited Guy and confessing to the murder itself, Claire commits suicide.

In a post-script, Kinsey explains that Tasha used a note Guy wrote to Kinsey as evidence of testamentary to ensure his share of the Malek millions goes to Peter and Winnie's church. The book ends with Kinsey's reconciling her grief at losing Guy, just as she once had to do with her deceased parents and aunt.

== Characters ==
- Kinsey Millhone: Private investigator who is hired to find the missing brother, who shares the inheritance of his late father with his brothers.

== Reception ==
The author was praised by Kirkus when they wrote "Polished, heartfelt work from Grafton"
