= "W" Is for Wasted =

2013 novel by Sue Grafton

- First edition cover
- Author: Sue Grafton
- Language: English
- Series: Alphabet Mysteries
- Genre: Mystery fiction
- Published: 2013 (G.P. Putnam's Sons)
- Publication place: United States
- Media type: Print (Hardcover)
- Pages: 469 first edition
- ISBN: 978-0-399-15898-8
- Preceded by: "V" Is for Vengeance
- Followed by: "X"

"W" Is for Wasted is the twenty-third novel in the "Alphabet" series of mystery novels by Sue Grafton. It features Kinsey Millhone, a private detective based in Santa Teresa, California, a fictional version of Santa Barbara, California.

The novel finds Kinsey investigating the deaths of a local private investigator and an unidentified homeless man. The novel was published in September 2013 by G.P. Putnam's Sons.

== Plot summary ==
Kinsey Millhone's colleague Aaron Blumberg informs her that a homeless man has been found dead on the beach with her contact information in his pocket. Kinsey tracks down the dead man's friends, three other homeless people named Felix, Dandy, and Pearl. With some difficulty, Kinsey persuades them to tell her the man's name: R. T. Dace. At the bank, she finds a safe deposit box in Dace's name containing $600,000 and a will leaving it all to her.

Kinsey, who never knew Dace in life, travels to Bakersfield to notify Dace's surviving family members: his son Ethan and daughters Ellen and Anna. All three have been estranged from their father for many years and are unmoved by the news of his death, even more so when they discover they have been disinherited in favor of a stranger. Returning home, Kinsey travels to the homeless camp where Dace lived in order to scavenge some of his stuff. As it turns out, what he left behind provides valuable clues about not only Dace's murder, but the death of another private investigator some months before.

== Characters ==
- Kinsey Millhone: Private investigator

== Title ==
Of the 5,700 fans who participated in a "guess the title" contest on Grafton's website, fewer than 50 guessed that "W" stood for "Wasted" for the 23rd installment in the "Alphabet" series. The title was revealed on May 1, 2013, in an interview with USA Today. Grafton explained that several meanings of "Wasted" apply to the novel, including "out of it on drugs" and "the notion of all the waste in crime".

== Reception ==
"W" is for Wasted was reviewed by Booklist, Kirkus Reviews, Library Journal, and Publishers Weekly.

Publishers Weekly also reviewed the audiobook narrated by Judy Kaye.
