= X (Grafton novel) =

2015 novel by Sue Grafton

- First edition cover
- Author: Sue Grafton
- Language: English
- Series: Alphabet Mysteries
- Genre: Mystery fiction
- Publisher: G.P. Putnam's Sons
- Publication date: August 25, 2015
- Publication place: United States
- Media type: Print (Hardcover)
- Pages: 400 first edition
- ISBN: 978-0-399-16384-5
- Preceded by: "W" Is for Wasted
- Followed by: "Y" Is for Yesterday

"X" is the twenty-fourth novel in the "Alphabet" series of mystery novels by Sue Grafton. It features Kinsey Millhone, a private detective based in Santa Teresa, California, a fictional version of Santa Barbara, California.

The novel, set in the late 1980s, finds Kinsey pursuing a sociopathic serial killer. It was published by G.P. Putnam's Sons, and released in the United States on August 25, 2015.

== Plot summary ==
The book starts off in third-person narrative by a woman called Teddy Xanakis. Teddy is in the throes of a bitter divorce and trying to ruin her ex-husband Ari, who had an affair with her best friend. The story transitions into first-person narrative by Kinsey Millhone. Since the last book she has inherited a large sum of money from a family member on her father's side. She meets with a client who wants her to find her biological son she gave up for adoption. She also starts trying to help out Pete Wolinsky's widow, Ruth, with an IRS audit. Another story-line involves new neighbors and attempts at water conservation. None of these story-lines are connected and Kinsey bounces back and forth between these disparate events throughout the book. Kinsey discovers that Pete was investigating a person he believed to be a serial killer who ends up attacking Kinsey. The disjointed plot lines have generally disappointed fans of her previous works.

== Characters ==
- Kinsey Millhone: Private investigator

== Title ==
When asked about the title of book 24 in 2013, Grafton told the Minneapolis Star-Tribune that the title "almost has to be Xenophobe or Xenophobia. I've checked the penal codes in most states and xylophone isn't a crime, so I'm stuck." A few months before the book was published, she revealed that it would break the pattern of the preceding 23 books, omitting the "is for" and alliterative word from the title.
