= "F" Is for Fugitive =

Novel by Sue Grafton

- First edition cover
- Author: Sue Grafton
- Language: English
- Series: Alphabet Mysteries
- Genre: Mystery fiction
- Published: 1989 (Henry Holt and Company)
- Publication place: United States
- Media type: Print (Hardcover)
- Pages: 261
- ISBN: 978-0-8050-0460-1
- OCLC: 18817342
- Dewey Decimal: 813/.54 19
- LC Class: PS3557.R13 F2 1989
- Preceded by: "E" Is for Evidence
- Followed by: "G" Is for Gumshoe

"F" Is for Fugitive is the sixth novel in Sue Grafton's "Alphabet" series of mystery novels and features Kinsey Millhone, a private eye based in Santa Teresa, California.

== Plot summary ==
Henry Pitts is having Kinsey's garage apartment rebuilt after it was destroyed in the events of the previous novel. Royce Fowler wants the detective to exonerate his son of the murder of Jean Timberlake, seventeen years before, in Floral Beach, California. Bailey Fowler pleaded guilty to killing Jean, his sometime girlfriend, and escaped from prison soon afterwards. He has apparently been living the life of a model citizen under an assumed name. He is recaptured and is claiming his innocence. Kinsey heads to Floral Beach, a tiny local community, to pursue the cold trail; and she stays with the Fowler family at their motel. Royce is dying of cancer; his wife Oribelle is sick with diabetes; and their daughter Ann, Bailey's senior by five years, has taken leave of absence from her job as a counselor at the local high school to provide care for her parents.

Bailey's lawyer, Jack Clemson, fills her in on the details of the case: Jean, 17 when she died, was a problem child who was doing badly in school and engaged in numerous sexual encounters with the local boys at school—and some of the local men, as well. She was pregnant at the time of her death. Everyone knows everyone in Floral Beach, and Kinsey acquaints herself with a number of the locals in pursuit of the truth: Pearl, the local bar-owner, whose son's evidence put Bailey on the spot at the time of Jean's death; Tap Granger, who was Bailey's accomplice in several robberies before the murder; the local pastor, Reverend Haws, and his wife; and Dr. Dunne, whose wife Elva has a violent objection to being questioned. The high school principal at the time of the murder, Dwight Shales, offers some help. Attention is turned to Jean's single mother, Shana, whose friendship with Dwight is causing prompted skepticism around Floral Beach. She is struggling with longstanding alcohol problems, is less co-operative, and refuses to identify Jean's father. Nobody seems convinced that the killer could be anyone but Bailey.

At Bailey's arraignment, Tap Granger stages a hold-up, allowing Bailey to escape once more. Tap is himself killed in the escape. Kinsey gets confirmation from Tap's widow that Tap was paid to do it—for the first time providing concrete evidence that someone wants to keep Bailey discredited. Someone breaks into Kinsey's motel room at the motel, and she receives threatening calls in the middle of the night as she pursues the case. Oribelle is murdered following the adulteration of her insulin, medication that is administered regularly by Ann.

Kinsey establishes that Dr. Dunne is Jean's unknown father. Shana is murdered when she sets out to keep a rendezvous with him. Kinsey runs from the cops herself after she finds the body and seeks refuge with Dwight Shales, who confesses that he, too, was having an affair with Jean and was probably the father of her child. Kinsey realizes that Ann Fowler is jealous of anyone who comes into contact with Dwight.

She searches Ann's room and finds evidence that Ann supplied Tap with the hold-up gun and made the anonymous phone calls. Unfortunately, she also finds Ann waiting for her, armed with a shotgun. Jean had confided in her, as school counselor, that Dwight was the father of her child. Motivated by jealousy, Ann killed her; and being equally jealous of her brother's position as favored child of their parents, Ann was happy to see him take the rap. Her plan is to use the money she will eventually inherit from her parents to tempt Dwight into marriage. She killed her mother to hasten the plan along. She also killed Shana, Jean's mother, because she was jealous of her friendship with Dwight. Before Ann can kill Kinsey, she is interrupted by Royce, who wrestles the gun away from Ann, shooting her in the foot accidentally in the process.

Ann, injured, is arrested for the murders of Shana and Oribelle. Though there is insufficient evidence to prove her to be Jean's killer, the circumstances are sufficient to ensure that Bailey is cleared of the murder.

== Characters ==
- Kinsey Millhone: Private detective called to Floral Beach to solve a case for an innocent man who has escaped from prison.
- Jean Timberlake: Murdered teen girl, whose murderer claims innocence.
- Royce Fowler: Father of the accused murderer, who hires Kinsey Millhone to find the murderer of Jean Timberlake. He is dying of cancer.
- Oribelle Fowler: Wife of Royce and mother of Bailey, who is disabled by diabetes. She is murdered during the investigation.
- Ann Fowler: First child of Royce and Oribelle, she took leave from her job as counselor at the local high school to care for her ailing parents.
- Bailey Fowler: Accused murderer of Jean Timberlake, who has escaped from prison.
- Jack Clemson: Attorney for Bailey Fowler.
- Dwight Shales: Principal of the local high school when Jean Timberlake was murdered.
- Tap Granger: Friend and sometime accomplice to Bailey who helps him escape prison again at Bailey's arraignment, and is killed during the escape. His widow provides evidence that Tap was paid to arrange the escape.
- Shana Timberlake: Mother of the murdered girl Jean. She will not identify Jean's father, and she suffers from alcohol problems. She is murdered during the investigation.
- Dr. Dunne: Local area doctor, who Kinsey suspects is the father of the murdered girl Jean.
- Elva Dunne: Wife of the local doctor, and difficult for Kinsey Millhone to question.

== Reviews ==
Kirkus Reviews called the novel a "winner" for Grafton, praising its plot, placing, characters, and ambience along with the development of Kinsey Millhone's character.

Publishers Weekly gave a similar review, calling the plot "complex" and noting the main character's continued development. The review said that "Grafton's series promises to hold readers all the way to Z."

== Development of novel ==
Grafton had originally planned to call the novel "F" Is for Forgery but decided during her research that "forgery was too boring a crime", shifting to a plot with fugitives from the law.

== Publication history ==
This is the first of her novels to appear on a best seller list, in paperback fiction.
