= "B" Is for Burglar =

1985 novel by Sue Grafton

- First edition cover
- Author: Sue Grafton
- Language: English
- Series: Alphabet Mysteries
- Genre: Mystery fiction
- Publisher: Henry Holt and Company
- Publication date: 1985
- Publication place: United States
- Media type: Print (Hardcover)
- Pages: 229 first edition
- ISBN: 978-0-8050-1632-1
- OCLC: 11261695
- Preceded by: "A" Is for Alibi
- Followed by: "C" Is for Corpse

"B" Is for Burglar is a mystery novel by American writer Sue Grafton. It was published in 1985 by Henry Holt and Company as the second novel in her "Alphabet" series of mystery novels.

The plot centers around the efforts of Kinsey Millhone, a private eye based in Santa Teresa, California, to locate a missing person. Critical reception was positive, and it won the 1986 Anthony Award and Shamus Award.

== Plot summary ==
Private investigator Kinsey Millhone is hired by Beverly Danziger to locate her missing sister, Elaine Boldt, whose name is needed on some paperwork regarding an inheritance. Elaine was last seen getting into a cab with the intention of flying down to Boca Raton, Florida, where she spends her winters, but appears to have disappeared along the way. It seems a relatively straightforward matter, so much so that Millhone is not sure Beverly needs a PI; but she agrees to take the case.

Things are not as easy as they seem, however, as Millhone can find no trace of Elaine anywhere in Florida, although she does find a woman called Pat Usher, who claims Elaine agreed to let her sublet the Boca Raton apartment where Elaine lived while she was off travelling. This claim rings false, since no one but Pat Usher has received a postcard from Elaine on her supposed trip. Millhone secures the able assistance of Elaine's elderly neighbour, Julia, to keep an eye on things in Florida while she goes back to California.

Millhone suspects there is a link between Elaine's disappearance and the death of her Santa Teresa neighbor, Marty Grice, who was apparently killed by a burglar who then set fire to the Grice home a week before Elaine left. Someone breaks into the home of Tillie, the supervisor of Elaine's Santa Teresa apartment complex, apparently on the track of some of Elaine's bills that Tillie was holding ready to forward to her. Someone also searches the detective's apartment, and Millhone realizes the thief is after Elaine's passport.

Gravely concerned for Elaine's safety, Millhone suggests to Beverly that Elaine's disappearance should be reported to the police; but Beverly objects so violently that Millhone terminates their relationship and starts working for Julia instead. Kinsey reports the disappearance and meets Jonah Robb, a recently separated cop working on missing persons. A visit from Beverly's husband Aubrey complicates matters further, as it turns out he was having an affair with Elaine, which Beverly had discovered. This raises suspicion around whether Beverly could have had a hand in Elaine's disappearance.

Millhone is increasingly convinced that Elaine is dead and that Pat Usher is involved. Pat disappears after vandalizing the Boca Raton apartment. Millhone discovers that Pat Usher has applied for a driver's license in Elaine's name, thus proving Pat's involvement.

Marty's nephew Mike, a teenage drug dealer, confesses that he was at the Grice home the night of the murder. From the discrepancy in times between his account and what was told to the police, Millhone realizes that it was Elaine who died in the Grice fire, not Marty. Marty and her husband killed Elaine to steal her identity and her money. They then passed Elaine's dead body off as Marty's by switching the dental records. Marty departed for Florida as Elaine and arrived as Pat Usher, with some cosmetic surgery to help. Unable to find Elaine's passport, she and her husband were forced to wait for a new one to come through before they can skip the country. Kinsey returns to the Grice home to look for the murder weapon, a sash weight, but the Grices find her. Marty Grice is shot in the left arm during the fight that ensues, but Kinsey manages to detain the two criminals and call for help.

== Reception ==
Ed Weiner, writing for The New York Times in 1989, called the book "one of the best written crime novels by anybody in recent memory". It was awarded the 1986 Anthony Award for Best Novel at Bouchercon, the World Mystery Convention, in Baltimore, Maryland. The novel also won the 1986 Shamus Award for Best Novel from the Private Eye Writers of America.
