= Sue Grafton =

American writer (1940–2017)

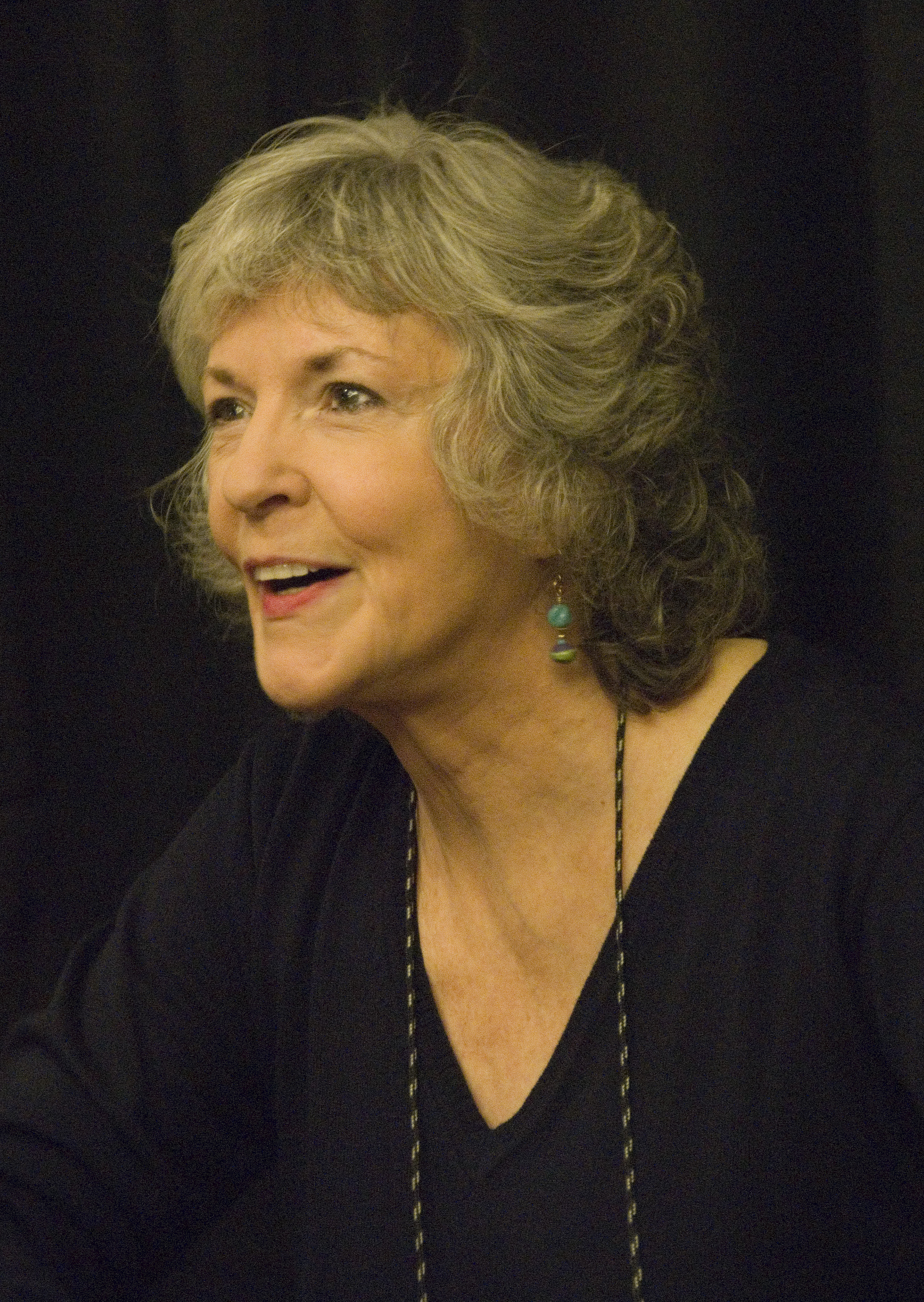
- Grafton in 2009
- Born: Sue Taylor Grafton; April 24, 1940; Louisville, Kentucky, U.S.
- Died: December 28, 2017 (aged 77); Santa Barbara, California, U.S.
- Education: University of Louisville
- Occupation: Novelist
- Spouse: Steven F. Humphrey
- Father: C. W. Grafton
- Writing career
- Period: 1964–2017 (first published novel: 1967)
- Genre: Mystery
- Notable work: Kinsey Millhone Alphabet series

Signature
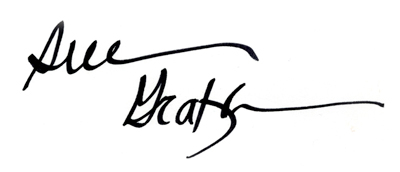
- Website: suegrafton.com

Sue Taylor Grafton (April 24, 1940 – December 28, 2017) was an American author of detective novels. She is best known as the author of the "alphabet series" ("A" Is for Alibi, etc.) featuring private investigator Kinsey Millhone in the fictional city of Santa Teresa, California. The daughter of detective novelist C. W. Grafton, she said the strongest influence on her crime novels was author Ross Macdonald. Before her success with this series, she wrote screenplays for television movies.

== Early life ==
Sue Grafton was born in Louisville, Kentucky, to C. W. Grafton (1909–1982) and Vivian Harnsberger, both of whom were the children of Presbyterian missionaries.

Her father was a municipal bond lawyer who also wrote mystery novels, and her mother was a former high school chemistry teacher. Her father enlisted in the Army during World War II when she was three and returned when she was five, after which her home life started falling apart. Both parents became alcoholics, and Grafton said "From the age of five onward, I was left to raise myself".

Grafton and her older sister, Ann, grew up in Louisville, where she went to Atherton High School. She attended the University of Louisville (first year) and Western Kentucky State Teachers College (now Western Kentucky University) in her sophomore and junior years before graduating from the University of Louisville in 1961 with a bachelor's degree in English literature and minors in humanities and fine arts. She was a member of Pi Beta Phi.

After graduating, Grafton worked as a hospital admissions clerk, a cashier, and a medical secretary in Santa Monica and Santa Barbara, California.

Grafton's mother killed herself in 1960 after returning home from an operation to remove esophageal cancer brought on by years of drinking and smoking. Her father died in 1982, a few months before "A" Is for Alibi was published.

== Writing career ==
Grafton's father was enamored with detective fiction and wrote at night. He taught Grafton lessons on the writing and editing process and groomed her to be a writer. Inspired by her father, Grafton began writing when she was 18 and finished her first novel four years later. She continued writing and completed six more novels. Only two of these seven novels (Keziah Dane and The Lolly-Madonna War) were published. Grafton would later destroy the manuscripts for her five early, unpublished novels.

Unable to find success with her novels, Grafton turned to screenplays. Grafton worked for the next 15 years writing screenplays for television movies, including Sex and the Single Parent; Mark, I Love You; and Nurse. Grafton sold the movie rights for The Lolly-Madonna War and co-wrote the screenplay for the feature film. The adaptation, released in 1973 as Lolly-Madonna XXX, starred Rod Steiger and Jeff Bridges. Her screenplay for Walking Through the Fire earned a Christopher Award in 1979. In collaboration with her husband, Steven Humphrey, she also adapted the Agatha Christie novels, A Caribbean Mystery and Sparkling Cyanide, for television and co-wrote A Killer in the Family and Love on the Run. She is credited with the story upon which the screenplay for the made-for-TV movie Svengali (1983) was based.

Her experience as a screenwriter taught her the basics of structuring a story, writing dialogue, and creating action sequences. Grafton then felt ready to return to writing fiction. While going through a "bitter divorce and custody battle that lasted six long years", Grafton imagined ways to kill or maim her ex-husband. Her fantasies were so vivid that she decided to write them down.

=== Alphabet series ===
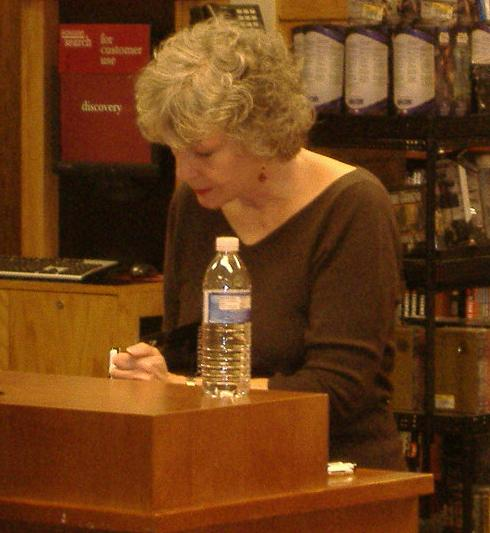
Sue Grafton

Grafton had been fascinated by mystery series whose titles were related, such as John D. MacDonald's Travis McGee series, each of which included a color in the title, and Harry Kemelman's Rabbi Small series, each of which included a day of the week in the title. While reading Edward Gorey's The Gashlycrumb Tinies, a picture book with an alphabetized list of ways for children to die, Grafton decided to write a series of novels whose titles would follow the alphabet. She immediately sat down and made a list of all of the crime-related words that she knew.

These became the series now known as the "alphabet novels", featuring sleuth and private investigator, Kinsey Millhone. The name rhymes and alliterates with that of Sharon McCone, the heroine of crime novels by Marcia Muller, of whom Grafton wrote, "Marcia Muller is the founding 'mother' of the contemporary female hard-boiled private eye." The series is set in Santa Teresa, a fictionalized version of Santa Barbara. Grafton followed the lead of Ross Macdonald, who created the fictional version of the city. Grafton described Kinsey Millhone as her alter ego, "the person I might have been had I not married young and had children."

The series begins with "A" Is for Alibi, published and set in 1982. "B" Is for Burglar followed in 1985; after that, Grafton usually put out a further book in the series every year or two. Each novel's title combined a letter with a word, except X. After the publication of "G" Is for Gumshoe, Grafton was able to quit her screenwriting job and focus on her novel writing.

Though written between 1982 and 2017, the Kinsey Millhone novels are all set in the 1980s, with each novel chronologically taking place only a few weeks (or at most a few months) after the previous one. The final novel ("Y" Is for Yesterday) is set in 1989.

The name of each book was a source of speculation. In May 2009, Grafton told Media Bistro that she was "just trying to figure out how to get from "U" is for Undertow to "Z" Is for Zero" and that "just because she knows the endgame title for Z [...] doesn't mean she knows what V, W, X, and Y will be". Grafton said that the series would end with "Z" Is for Zero, but she died before she could begin writing it. Her daughter said Grafton would never allow a ghostwriter to write in her name and "as far as we in the family are concerned, the alphabet now ends at Y."

Grafton's novels have been published in 28 countries and in 26 languages. She refused to sell the film and television rights, because writing screenplays "cured" her of the desire to work with Hollywood. (TV movies in Japan, however, were adapted from "B" is for Burglar and "D" is for Deadbeat.) Grafton told her children her ghost would haunt them if they sold the film rights after her death. The books in the series were on The New York Times Best Seller list for an aggregate of about 400 weeks. F is for Fugitive was the first, entering at number 10 on the paperback list; by 1995 "L" is for Lawless entered the best seller list at number one followed by ten more in the series.

"Q" is for Quarry was inspired by the real-life case of the Lompoc Jane Doe, which also inspired the creation of the DNA Doe Project, a nonprofit organization that uses forensic genetic genealogy to identify unidentified human remains. In 2001, Grafton funded the exhumation and subsequent reburial of the victim's remains. A new facial reconstruction created by Betty Patt Gatliff, along with additional details about the case obtained from the Santa Barbara County Sheriff's Office, was included in Grafton's book in the hope that someone would recognize the victim. In 2025, the DNA Doe Project began working on the case.

== Writing style ==
Grafton's style is characteristic of hardboiled detective fiction, according to the authors of 'G' is for Grafton, who describe it as "laconic, breezy, wise-cracking". The novels are framed as reports Kinsey writes in the course of her investigations, which are signed off in the epilogue of each novel. The first-person narrative allows the reader to see through the eyes of Kinsey, who chronicles various descriptions of "eccentric buildings and places", giving depth to the narrative.

== Awards ==
Work	Year & Award	Category	Result	Ref.
B is for Burglar	1986 Shamus Award	P.I. Hardcover Novel	Won	
B is for Burglar	1986 Anthony Awards	Novel	Won	
The Parker Shotgun	1987 Macavity Awards	Mystery Short Story	Won	
The Parker Shotgun	1987 Anthony Awards	Short Story	Won	
C is for Corpse	1987 Anthony Awards	Novel	Won	
E Is for Evidence	1989 Macavity Awards	Mystery Novel	Nominated	
E Is for Evidence	1989 Anthony Awards	Novel	Nominated	
F Is for Fugitive	1991 Maltese Falcon Society "Falcon Award"		Won	
G Is for Gumshoe	1991 Shamus Award	P.I. Hardcover Novel	Won	
G Is for Gumshoe	1991 Anthony Awards	Novel	Won	
A Poison That Leaves No Trace	1991 Edgar Allan Poe Award	Short Story	Nominated	
K Is for Killer	1995 Shamus Award	P.I. Hardcover Novel	Won	
K Is for Killer	1995 Anthony Awards	Novel	Nominated	
M Is for Malice	1997 Audie Awards	Mystery	Nominated	
O Is for Outlaw	2000 Audie Awards	Mystery	Nominated	
Writing Mysteries: A Handbook by the Mystery Writers of America (with Jan Burke)	2002 Agatha Award	Non-Fiction	Nominated	
Q Is for Quarry	2003 Audie Awards	Mystery	Nominated	
W Is for Wasted	2012 Lefty Award	The Squid (Best mystery set within the United States)	Nominated	
W Is for Wasted	2013 Goodreads Choice Awards	Mystery & Thriller	Nominated	
W Is for Wasted	2014 Killer Nashville Awards	Silver Falchion Award (Private Detective / Police Procedural / Mystery)	Won	
V Is for Vengeance	2012 Lefty Award	Golden Nugget Award (Best mystery set in California)	Nominated	
Kinsey Millhone	2014 Shamus Award	P.I. Series Character	Won	
Y Is for Yesterday	2018 Anthony Awards	Bill Crider Award for Novel in a Series	Won	
Herself	2000 YWCA of Lexington Smith-Breckinridge	Distinguished Woman of Achievement Award	Won	
Herself	2003 Shamus Award	Lifetime Achievement Award	Won	
Herself	2004 Ross Macdonald Literary Award		Won	
Herself	2008 Crime Writers' Association's CWA Diamond Dagger award		Won	
Herself	2009 Edgar Awards	Grand Master Award	Won	
Herself	2011 Agatha Award	Malice Domestic Award for Lifetime Achievement	Won	
Herself	2013 Bouchercon	Lifetime Achievement Award	Won	

== Personal life ==
Grafton first married in 1959, aged 18, to James L. Flood, with whom she had a son and a daughter. The two divorced by the time Grafton graduated from college in 1961. Her second marriage was with Al Schmidt in 1962, but it ended with protracted divorce and custody proceedings over their daughter.

She married her third husband, Steven F. Humphrey, in 1978. They divided their time between Santa Barbara, California, and Louisville, Kentucky; Humphrey taught at universities in both cities. In 2000, the couple bought and later restored Lincliff, a 28-acre (11 ha) Louisville estate once owned by hardware baron William Richardson Belknap.

Grafton died at Cottage Hospital in Santa Barbara on December 28, 2017, after a two-year battle with cancer of the appendix.

In 2019, an award in Grafton's memory was established by G.P. Putnam's Sons and is under the aegis of the Mystery Writers of America.

== Works ==
- Keziah Dane (1967)
- The Lolly-Madonna War (1969) – filmed as Lolly-Madonna XXX (1973)

=== Alphabet Mystery series ===
1. "A" Is for Alibi (1982)
2. "B" Is for Burglar (1985)
3. "C" Is for Corpse (1986)
4. "D" Is for Deadbeat (1987)
5. "E" Is for Evidence (1988)
6. "F" Is for Fugitive (1989)
7. "G" Is for Gumshoe (1990)
8. "H" Is for Homicide (1991)
9. "I" Is for Innocent (1992)
10. "J" Is for Judgment (1993)
11. "K" Is for Killer (1994)
12. "L" Is for Lawless (1995)
13. "M" Is for Malice (1996)
14. "N" Is for Noose (1998)
15. "O" Is for Outlaw (1999)
16. "P" Is for Peril (2001)
17. "Q" Is for Quarry (2002)
18. "R" Is for Ricochet (2004)
19. "S" Is for Silence (2005)
20. "T" Is for Trespass (2007)
21. "U" Is for Undertow (2009)
22. "V" Is for Vengeance (2011)
23. Kinsey and Me (2013) – contains 9 Kinsey Millhone short stories
24. "W" Is for Wasted (2013)
25. "X" (2015)
26. "Y" Is for Yesterday (2017)

=== Essays and short stories ===
- "Teaching a Child" (2013) – essay in the anthology Knitting Yarns: Writers on Knitting, published by W. W. Norton & Company.
- Kinsey and Me (2013) – a collection of nine Kinsey Millhone short stories along with 12 other short stories about Grafton's own mother. The Kinsey Millhone stories, with one exception, appeared in magazines and mystery anthologies between 1986 and 1991. The dozen other stories, none previously published, feature Kit Blue, who, Grafton said, "is simply a younger version of myself." The book also includes a preface, introductions to the two separate story collections, and a previously published essay on hard-boiled private investigators.
- The Lying Game (2003) – a Kinsey Millhone short story which appeared in the September 2003 special 40th anniversary Lands' End catalogue. It also appeared as a separate pamphlet given to attendees at Malice Domestic 2011 conference, where Grafton was recognized for Lifetime Achievement. It is included in Kinsey and Me.
- If You Want Something Done Right . . . (Published 2020) An unpublished story found among Sue Grafton's papers by her husband after her death and originally published in Deadly Anniversaries, edited by Marcia Muller and Bill Pronzini. Reprinted in The Best Mystery Stories of the Year 2021, edited by Lee Child.

=== As editor ===
- Writing Mysteries: A Handbook by the Mystery Writers of America (with Jan Burke)

== In popular culture ==
Grafton's introduction of a young, no-nonsense female private detective in the Alphabet Mystery series was ground-breaking at the time when A is for Alibi was first released in 1982. Until the creation of Kinsey Milhone, private detectives in fiction were almost always male.

- In the "Mayham" episode of The Sopranos, Carmela sits by Tony's bedside in the hospital, reading a Sue Grafton novel.
- In the "Local Ad" episode of The Office, Phyllis goes to a Sue Grafton book signing at the mall to try to get her to be in the Dunder-Mifflin Scranton branch commercial. She is told by Michael Scott not to take no for an answer. After waiting in line, Phyllis meets Grafton, only to be rebuffed by her. Phyllis continues to ask until she is thrown out of the store in front of all her friends. Meanwhile, Andy and Creed talk about how "crazy hot" the author is.
- A scene in the film Stranger than Fiction shows Prof. Hilbert reading the Sue Grafton novel "I" Is for Innocent while serving as a lifeguard.
- In the Superego podcast Season 3 Episode 14, guest star, actor and comedian, Rob Delaney impersonates Sue Grafton.
- Kinsey Millhone is featured in cameo appearances in crime novels by other authors. Bill Pronzini and Marcia Muller have their fictional detective spot Millhone at a convention in Chicago. Sara Paretsky has her sleuth V. I. Warshawski envy Millhone's organization.

== Sources ==
- Kaufman, Natalie Hevener; Kay, Carol McGinnis (1997). "G" Is for Grafton: The World of Kinsey Millhone (Hardcover ed.). Henry Holt and Company. ISBN 0-8050-5446-4.
