= "J" Is for Judgment =

Novel by Sue Grafton

- First edition cover
- Author: Sue Grafton
- Language: English
- Series: Alphabet Mysteries
- Genre: Mystery fiction
- Published: 1993 Henry Holt and Company
- Publication place: United States
- Media type: Print (Hardcover)
- Pages: 288 first edition
- ISBN: 978-0-8050-1935-3
- OCLC: 26854030
- Dewey Decimal: 813/.54 20
- LC Class: PS3557.R13 J2 1993
- Preceded by: "I" Is for Innocent
- Followed by: "K" Is for Killer

"J" Is for Judgment is the tenth novel in Sue Grafton's "Alphabet" series of mystery novels and features Kinsey Millhone, a private eye based in Santa Teresa, California. The novel is set in 1984 and features a significant development in Kinsey's personal back-story, as she discovers that she has extensive family living in the Lompoc area.

== Plot summary ==
Kinsey Millhone's former employer, California Fidelity Insurance, hires her to investigate the alleged reappearance of Ponzi schemer Wendell Jaffe. Jaffe was assumed to have died five years previously when his boat, the Captain Stanley Lord, was found drifting off the Baja coast. He left behind a suicide note, a number of angry investors, and a family: a wife, Dana, along with sons Michael and Brian. With no body to prove death, CFI made Dana wait the full statutory five years to presume death before paying out on Jaffe's half-million insurance claim. She has been making ends meet by working as a wedding planner. Michael, now 22, has coped reasonably well with suddenly being the man of the house and is a new husband and father himself. Eighteen-year-old Brian, on the other hand, is currently residing in juvenile hall. Two months after the insurance payout, a former CFI employee has spotted a man he is convinced is Jaffe in Viento Negro, Mexico.

In Mexico, Kinsey finds Jaffe is now known as Dean DeWitt Huff. Huff/Jaffe is traveling with a woman named Renata Huff, who has a residence on the quay in Perdido, near Santa Teresa, as well as a boat of her own. Before Kinsey can prove his identity, they vanish. That same day, Brian is arrested in the middle of a botched escape attempt, but is just as suddenly released on a technicality. Kinsey is convinced Jaffe arranged Brian's escape and is heading back to California to reconnect with his son.

Renata catches Kinsey searching on her property, but admits Wendell is visiting Michael. Kinsey tracks Jaffe down, but someone begins firing shots at them both and he escapes once more. The next day, the Captain Stanley Lord is found drifting a few miles off-shore just as it was the first time Jaffe vanished.

Kinsey has proved Jaffe didn't die and therefore the insurance money can be reclaimed from Dana. Though her job is done, Kinsey goes in search of the full story. She finds Brian, and also finds out from Jaffe's former business partner Carl Eckert that there was three million dollars from their fraudulent business scheme on board the missing boat. Renata confesses that she killed Wendell, dumped his body at sea, and then set the Lord adrift, making her way back to shore in her own dinghy. She then wades out into the sea to kill herself, and Kinsey is unable to stop her. Jaffe's body washes up on the shore, but Renata's never does, leaving Kinsey to wonder if, like her husband, she has managed to fake her own death.

In a subplot, Kinsey discovers she has long lost family living in nearby Lompoc. Her cousin Liza tells her the family scandal: Kinsey's mother was cut off from her family for marrying Kinsey's father. Kinsey is aghast that no one has tried to track her down in the 29 years since her parents were killed and is resentful of any intrusion into her solitude at this late date.

== Characters ==
- Kinsey Millhone: Private investigator who is asked to again work for the insurance company that severed ties months earlier.

== Reception ==
"J" Is for Judgment was a New York Times best-seller and had an initial press run of nearly half a million copies.
