= "V" Is for Vengeance =

2011 novel by Sue Grafton

- First edition cover
- Author: Sue Grafton
- Language: English
- Series: Alphabet Mysteries
- Genre: Mystery fiction
- Publisher: G.P. Putnam's Sons
- Publication date: November 21, 2011
- Publication place: United States
- Media type: Print (hardcover)
- Pages: 437
- ISBN: 978-0-399-15786-8
- Preceded by: "U" Is for Undertow
- Followed by: "W" Is for Wasted

"V" Is for Vengeance is the 22nd novel in Sue Grafton's "Alphabet" series of mystery novels and features Kinsey Millhone, a private eye based in Santa Teresa, California, a fictional version of Santa Barbara, California.

The novel, set in 1988, was released in the United States in November 2011.

== Plot summary ==
For the fourth straight novel in the Alphabet Mystery series, the viewpoint alternates between Millhone and other characters, principally Nora Vogelsang and Lorenzo Dante. The opening chapter, however, is told from the perspective of a well-to-do young man, Phillip Lanahan, who borrows money from Dante, misses the payback date, and then loses it playing poker in Las Vegas. Dante and his brother Cappi show up, and Dante agrees to take Phillip's Porsche as satisfaction of the debt. However, after Dante sends Phillip and Cappi up to look at the car, Cappi has thugs throw Phillip off the top of the parking garage to his death.

In the main storyline, Millhone witnesses a woman shoplifting with an accomplice inside the department store Nordstrom's. She tells a nearby clerk, who alerts store security, and they capture and arrest the woman, named Audrey, before she can escape. While this is going on, Millhone follows the accomplice and is almost run over by her in the parking garage. Right after her release from jail, Audrey apparently commits suicide. Shortly thereafter, Millhone runs into a former boyfriend in the police department, Cheney Phillips, who is out for the evening with a vice officer, Len Priddy, and his much-younger girlfriend, Abbey. Len Priddy was a friend of Millhone's first husband and is a longtime enemy of hers. Priddy mocks the theory that Audrey was part of a shoplifting ring, but Audrey's boyfriend hires Millhone to investigate that theory.

Meanwhile, Dante realizes that the police are closing in on his operation. Audrey had been head of his shoplifting operation, but Cappi murders her upon her release from jail because he believed she was about to turn them in. Dante believes that Cappi has been giving information to Priddy to set up his brother, so that he can take over. Nora, who has been drifting apart from her husband for the last three years (which we later learn began with the death of her son Phillip from her first marriage), learns that her lawyer husband is having an affair with his secretary. She decides to sell some jewelry to provide her with enough money to be able to leave her husband. She is referred to Dante, who is instantly drawn to her and offers her more than fair value for the ring. Against her better judgement she agrees to meet Dante, who becomes fascinated by Nora and all that she represents.

Kinsey, still investigating the death of Audrey, has a sudden flash of inspiration from an offhanded comment by her client; she returns to the department store to view the video footage and notices a bumper sticker on the car which had almost run her down. This leads her to the accomplice. She discovers after trailing her for several days that she is the drop off person who deposits stolen goods into a fake charity's drop off box. The bags are then picked up minutes later by a truck that takes them to Dante's warehouse for distribution to various second hand stores around Southern California.

When Kinsey gives Cheney a copy of her findings thus far, he tells her to back off as she could be endangering the life of a confidential informant. This causes her to do the exact opposite. She investigates further and slowly peels back the layers of the syndicate. Her old friend Pinky Ford (the man who gave her her first set of lock picks) comes to her office and asks her to hold on to some photos for him. Kinsey refuses. Later Lt. Priddy comes to the office looking for the photos and threatens Kinsey physically. She manages to track down Pinky and find out that the photos are blackmail material that Priddy has been using to get information from Pinky about Dante's operation.

Pinky leaves Kinsey's care and returns home. Kinsey tracks Pinky to his home, to find Cappi holding Pinky's wife hostage. Cappi orders Kinsey to burn the photos and the negatives in the fireplace. Cappi leaves without harming anyone further, but an enraged Pinky gets his shotgun from the closet and follows him out to the street and shoots at him, but misses Cappi completely. Cappi fires off a couple of rounds that seem to miss everyone, and he flees the scene. When Kinsey and Pinky go back into the house, they see that his wife has been shot. She is taken to the hospital, where Pinky worries about how they can afford her treatment.

Kinsey tracks down Dante at his office, where she tells him what has happened. Dante takes the time to set up an account at the hospital to take care of Pinky's wife, even though he is in the middle of preparing to leave the country. After feeding bad information to his brother Cappi, whom he suspected of leaking information to Priddy, Dante had tried to convince Nora to join him. He confessed that it was because of him that her son had been murdered, but that it was done without his knowledge or consent. He explained his motivation for lending Phillip the money and gave her the details of his trip. He leaves hoping that she will join him.

On the day that Dante had told Cappi the computer records would be wiped out, Pinky's wife dies from her gunshot wound. Kinsey goes to Dante's warehouse to try to keep Pinky from killing Cappi, and sees federal authorities preparing to raid the warehouse. Looking for Pinky at the warehouse, she encounters Dante again. When the raid begins, Pinky is wounded in the leg by Cappi, who is eventually shot by police. Dante punches Kinsey in the face, knocking her out and preventing her from getting between Cappi and Pinky and possibly being shot herself. He then disappears into the maze of tunnels under the warehouse. He is picked up by his real secretary and makes it to the airport, where he has chartered a flight out of the country. Just as his plane is taxiing away from the gate, Nora arrives and leaves with him.

Weeks later Dante's secretary comes to Kinsey's office to give her an envelope full of cash to make up for Dante punching her in the face, and also as payment for a job he wants her to do for him. Dante had recorded a conversation with Priddy that would implicate him in trying to gain control of Dante's operations, and which would put him in prison. Wary of contacting the proper authorities who might bury the information and never go after Priddy, Kinsey calls a 'gung ho' reporter who she knows will publish the story, after which the authorities will have no choice but to arrest and prosecute Priddy.

== Characters ==
- Kinsey Millhone: Private detective who pursues a shoplifter at a department store.

== Title ==
In late-April 2010, Grafton reported being "around 100 pages into [writing] it [this novel]" and that she "hasn't glommed onto a title yet". The book's title was officially announced on the author's Facebook page on April 8, 2011.
