= "H" Is for Homicide =

Novel by Sue Grafton

- First edition cover
- Author: Sue Grafton
- Language: English
- Series: Alphabet Mysteries
- Genre: Mystery fiction
- Published: 1991 Henry Holt and Company
- Publication place: United States
- Media type: Print (Hardcover)
- Pages: 256 first edition
- ISBN: 978-0-8050-1084-8
- OCLC: 22812747
- Dewey Decimal: 813/.54 20
- LC Class: PS3557.R13 H17 1991
- Preceded by: "G" Is for Gumshoe
- Followed by: "I" Is for Innocent

"H" Is for Homicide is the eighth novel in Sue Grafton's "Alphabet" series of mystery novels and features Kinsey Millhone, a private eye based in Santa Teresa, California. In this novel, Kinsey Millhone goes under cover to help break up an insurance fraud ring in Los Angeles led by Raymond Maldonado. She infiltrates the ring by befriending Maldonado's former girlfriend Bibianna Diaz. In the process she meets up with a former school mate and ex cop, Jimmy Tate.

This novel earned a place on the New York Times hard-cover best-seller list just two weeks after initial publication.

== Plot summary ==
When insurance adjuster Parnell Perkins is shot and killed, Kinsey is passed one of his case files to investigate for possible insurance fraud. Kinsey assumes a false identity as Hannah Moore in an attempt to befriend the suspect, Bibianna Diaz. She discovers that Bibianna is in a relationship with a former schoolmate of Kinsey's, disgraced police officer Jimmy Tate. Meanwhile, Bibianna's jealous former boyfriend Raymond Maldonaldo is hunting her down. While Kinsey is out drinking with Bibianna and Tate, Raymond's brother Chago and his girlfriend Dawna accost Bibianna. In the fracas that ensues, Tate shoots and kills Chago. Bibianna and Kinsey are taken into custody.

Santa Teresa Police Lieutenant Dolan visits Kinsey in jail and offers her a job. He reveals that Raymond is the head of a huge insurance fraud gang, possibly receiving inside information from a contact within the department. The police want Kinsey to use her new position as Bibianna's confidante to get the evidence they need.

Kinsey goes with Raymond and Bibianna back to their apartment in South Los Angeles, which the couple share with Raymond's associate, Luis. Over the next several days, Raymond teaches Kinsey how he and his gang defraud insurance companies by staging car accidents and reporting fake injuries with the help of cooperative medical professionals and attorneys. Kinsey discovers that Parnell Perkins used to help the gang file their fraudulent insurance claims before fleeing to Santa Teresa. Kinsey eventually establishes that the leak is a clerk at the County Sheriff's office, whose father is a crooked chiropractor involved with Raymond's gang. It is revealed that the same clerk alerted the gang to Perkins' presence in Santa Teresa, where Raymond found and killed him.

Bibianna reveals that while Raymond is determined to force her into marriage, she has just married Tate. Matters come to a head when Bibianna escapes and is pursued almost to her death by one of Raymond's henchmen. Visiting her in the hospital, the doctor lets slip to Raymond that Bibianna's next of kin is her husband, Jimmy Tate, who is already at the hospital visiting his wife. Enraged, Raymond shoots Jimmy. Kinsey sets off in hot pursuit and receives unexpected help from Luis, who turns out to be an undercover officer with the Los Angeles Police Department. Kinsey makes it back to Santa Teresa in time for her friend Vera Lipton's wedding, but is fired from her job by new Vice President Gordon Titus.

== Publication history ==
With a first printing of 170,000 copies, this book earned a place on the New York Times hard-cover best-seller list just two weeks after initial publication.
