= "G" Is for Gumshoe =

Novel by Sue Grafton

- First edition cover
- Author: Sue Grafton
- Language: English
- Series: Alphabet Mysteries
- Genre: Mystery fiction
- Published: 1990 Henry Holt and Company
- Publication place: United States
- Media type: Print (Hardcover)
- Pages: 261
- ISBN: 978-0-8050-0461-8
- OCLC: 20560785
- Dewey Decimal: 813/.54 20
- LC Class: PS3557.R13 G14 1990
- Preceded by: "F" Is for Fugitive
- Followed by: "H" Is for Homicide

"G" Is for Gumshoe (1990) is the seventh novel in Sue Grafton's "Alphabet" series of mystery novels and features Kinsey Millhone, a private eye based in Santa Teresa, California.

In "G" Is for Gumshoe, Kinsey Millhone meets fellow investigator Robert Dietz when someone hires a hit man to kill her. While Kinsey is being stalked, she uncovers an unsolved murder that haunts the lives of her client Mrs. Irene Gersh and Irene's "mother" who uses the alias "Agnes Grey" (the title of an Anne Brontë novel). In other developments in Kinsey's personal story, she loses her VW car, and her friend Vera Lipton becomes engaged.

== Plot summary ==
Three things happen to Kinsey Millhone on her thirty-third birthday: she moves into her remodeled apartment, which has finally been finished; she is hired by Irene Gersh, a sickly Santa Teresa resident, to head out to the Slabs in the Mojave Desert and locate her mother; and she gets the news that Tyrone Patty, a particularly dangerous criminal she helped the Carson City Police Department track down a few years back, has hired a hit-man to kill her.

After her first night in her new place, Kinsey heads out early the next day in search of Mrs Gersh's mother, Agnes Grey, who lives in a trailer in the desert. Agnes isn't home, and the trailer seems to be occupied by two teenage runaways; but Kinsey eventually tracks Agnes down at a local convalescent hospital, where she has been since being taken suddenly ill on a trip to a local town sometime before. Agnes, 83 years old, has not been a model patient; and the hospital staff are delighted to hear that she has relatives who can take responsibility for her. Irene makes plans to transfer Agnes to a facility in Santa Teresa. But Agnes seems terrified of going there and tells Kinsey a confused story about a number of people from the past, including Lottie and Emily, who died.

Kinsey makes plans to come home, but before she can do so, a man in a pick-up truck deliberately runs her off the road, seriously injuring Kinsey and totaling her treasured VW automobile. Kinsey recognizes the driver as a man traveling with his young son she has seen a couple of times on the journey to the Slabs, and realizes she needs to take the death threat against her seriously. She hires Robert Dietz, as a bodyguard. His vigilance initially frustrates Kinsey, who is used to making her own decisions; but they soon begin an affair. Dietz discovers the hitman is Mark Messinger, who absconded with his son, Eric, eight months previously. He arranges a meeting with the child's mother, Rochelle, who is desperate to get her son back, and offers to help her.

Meanwhile, Agnes goes missing only a few hours after getting to Santa Teresa. She is soon found, yet she dies of fright within a day. Kinsey and Robert Dietz suspect she was kept prisoner somewhere before her death. Irene suffers a serious panic reaction when she sees a tea set Kinsey found among her mother's possessions, and Kinsey suspects this has triggered a buried childhood memory. Further anomalies occur when Irene tries to fill in the paperwork relating to the death: Kinsey realizes that Irene's birth certificate is faked and that Agnes Grey is a pseudonym. It's Kinsey's CFI colleague Darcy who points out Agnes Grey is the name of a novel by Anne Brontë, which seems to link to the names Emily and Lottie (Charlotte) Agnes had mentioned. Kinsey tracks down a family called Bronfen, who match the circumstances Agnes described, and surmises that the surviving brother of the family, Patrick, murdered Lottie and Emily. She is convinced that when Patrick killed Irene's mother, Sheila, Agnes Grey was Anne Bronfen, a third sister, who took off with Irene to protect her, changing their identities and posing as the young Irene's mother. The three daughters were presumably named for the Brontë sisters, which explains the alias Anne chose to use. Patrick faked Anne's death in order to gain sole possession of the family property.

Kinsey is convinced that Patrick is responsible for Agnes's death, to cover his past crimes, and discovers evidence of further killings at his home. When she confronts Patrick, she is interrupted by Messinger, who kills Patrick. Dietz and Rochelle have managed to get Eric away from Messinger, and Messinger's stated intention is to use Kinsey as a hostage to exchange for Eric. As she drives Messinger to the airport at gunpoint to intercept Rochelle, Kinsey is convinced Messinger will kill them all; and he succeeds in killing Rochelle's twin Roy, who was attempting to help her escape with Eric. However, Rochelle outsmarts Messinger and kills him first.

In the epilogue, the third contract killer hired by Tyrone Patty is apprehended; and Patty himself dies as a consequence of a jail altercation. Dietz leaves to pursue his plan of providing anti-terrorism training on military bases.

== Characters ==
- Kinsey Millhone: Private investigator hired to find the 83-year-old mother of her client.

== Reception ==
"G" Is for Gumshoe was honored with both the Private Eye Writers of America's Shamus Award for best novel and Bouchercon's 1991 Anthony Award for Best Novel. The reviewer for the School Library Journal considered the book oriented towards adults and suitable for young adults as well and wrote that "this light mystery maintains interest to the end".
