= "K" Is for Killer =

Novel by Sue Grafton

- First edition cover
- Author: Sue Grafton
- Language: English
- Series: Alphabet Mysteries
- Genre: Mystery fiction
- Published: 1994 (Henry Holt and Company)
- Publication place: United States
- Media type: Print (Hardcover)
- Pages: 285 first edition
- ISBN: 978-0-8050-1936-0
- OCLC: 29703955
- Dewey Decimal: 813/.54 20
- LC Class: PS3557.R13 K2 1994
- Preceded by: "J" Is for Judgment
- Followed by: "L" Is for Lawless

"K" Is for Killer is the 11th novel in Sue Grafton's "Alphabet" series of mystery novels and features Kinsey Millhone, a private eye based in Santa Teresa, California. The book had an initial printing of reportedly 600,000 copies and was a New York Times bestseller.

== Plot ==
Kinsey Millhone receives a visit from Janice Kepler whose beautiful but reclusive daughter, Lorna, died 10 months ago of an apparent allergic reaction. Recently, someone sent Janice a tape of a pornographic movie Lorna made before her death, and Janice, who has never believed the official story, wants Kinsey to find out the truth. Janice's husband, Mace, and her two surviving daughters, Berlyn and Trinny, seem less keen on the investigation.

Officer Cheney Phillips informs Kinsey that Lorna was leading a double life: receptionist at the water treatment plant by day, high class prostitute by night. Phillips introduces Kinsey to Danielle, a teenage colleague of Lorna's in her night-time occupation.

Kinsey discovers that Lorna's body was found by Serena Bonney, night-shift nurse and estranged wife of Lorna's boss at the water treatment plant, Roger Bonney. Serena's father, Clark Esselmann, is a powerful business tycoon and member of the local water board.

Kinsey has a terrifying Mafia-style encounter with a man describing himself as an attorney for a Los Angeles man to whom Lorna was engaged. He asks Kinsey to keep him abreast of any developments in the case.

Kinsey discovers that Berlyn found Lorna's body two days before Bonney, but kept quiet about in order to steal some of Lorna's money. Berlyn sent her mother the video of Lorna's pornographic film.

Leda, the wife of Lorna's landlord, had placed recording equipment in Lorna's cabin because she was worried that Lorna was having an affair with her husband. With the help of Lorna's friend, late-night radio DJ Hector Moreno, Kinsey transcribes the taped conversations, but can't make sense of them at first. Kinsey attends a meeting of the water board, where she witnesses a contentious debate between Esselman and his business rival John "Stubby" Stockton.

The next day, Esselmann is electrocuted in his swimming pool. Thinking back to the recordings, Kinsey realizes the conversation is someone telling Lorna about the plot to kill Esselmann. She surmises that Lorna was killed to keep her quiet. Kinsey's suspicions turn at first to Stubby Stockton, but then she realizes Roger Bonney had the necessary knowledge and access to his father-in-law's pool to have set up the electrocution. Kinsey's suspicions are confirmed when she finds a photo of Lorna and Danielle with their "clients" Stockton and Bonney.

Kinsey talks to Cheney Phillips about her suspicions of Bonney, but he points out there is no evidence. Frustrated that Bonney is likely to get away with murder, Kinsey phones the Mafia men and reports that Bonney is the killer. Overcome with guilt, she tries to warn Bonney, but he thinks she has come to confront him with the murder and stuns her with a taser. While Kinsey lies powerless on the floor, the Mafia men arrive and escort Bonney away, never to be seen again.

== Awards ==
"K" Is for Killer was awarded the 1995 Shamus Award for Best Novel from the Private Eye Writers of America and was nominated for the 1995 Anthony Award in the same category.
