= "S" Is for Silence =

Novel by Sue Grafton

- First edition cover
- Author: Sue Grafton
- Language: English
- Series: Alphabet Mysteries
- Genre: Mystery fiction
- Publisher: G. P. Putnam's Sons
- Publication date: December 2005
- Publication place: United States
- Media type: Print (hardcover)
- Pages: 374 first edition
- ISBN: 978-0-399-15297-9
- OCLC: 60550855
- Dewey Decimal: 813/.54 22
- LC Class: PS3557.R13 S15 2005
- Preceded by: "R" Is for Ricochet
- Followed by: "T" Is for Trespass

"S" Is for Silence is the 19th novel in Sue Grafton's "Alphabet" series of mystery novels and features Kinsey Millhone, a private eye based in Santa Teresa, California.

In a departure from the series format, this novel is set in alternating chapters both in the "past" of 1953 and the "present" of 1987. Unusually for the series, the book also contains several explicit sex scenes, including a detailed one with a 14 year old, and a couple minor homosexual references.

Shortly after publication, this novel topped The New York Times best-seller list for hardcover fiction.

== Plot summary ==
In 1953, Violet Sullivan vanishes after going out for a Fourth of July party in the small town of Serena Station, California. Her exact whereabouts are unknown; however, there are many tales that she fled off with a lover or was killed by her envious husband, Philemon "Foley" Sullivan. Thirty-four years later, Kinsey Millhone is hired by Daisy, Violet's daughter, to find answers and gain closure regarding Violet's disappearance. Daisy provides Kinsey a list of possible suspects: Foley; Daisy's babysitter, Liza Mellincamp; Liza's best friend, Kathy Cramer; and Kathy's father, car dealer Chet Cramer.

As Kinsey conducts her interviews, she gains a broader perspective on the victim. While Liza found Violet's independence inspiring, everyone else in town considered her a woman of loose morals, who brought out the worst in everyone she met, including her husband. In the days before Violet disappeared, she and Foley had a fight in which Foley tore down the lace curtains Violet had made for their home. Violet visited the Cramer Chevrolet dealership and convinced junior salesman Winston Smith to lend her a Bel Air, whereupon she drove to the bank and withdrew all her savings. Chet Cramer, angry that Violet put over 200 miles on the car, insisted that Foley purchase it. On the 4th of July, Violet took her Pomeranian Baby and left town in the Chevy, never to be seen again.

When Kinsey interviews Cramer, he reveals that his daughter Kathy married Winston Smith. Kinsey discovers that Kathy's status-seeking and excessive spending habits have made the marriage difficult. Smith reveals that he saw the Bel Air much later that night, abandoned on an offbeat road. While visiting the area of the road, Kinsey spots an oblong depression in the soil and theorizes that the car is buried beneath. The car is excavated and the bodies of both Violet and Baby are found, wrapped in the lace curtain. Violet's hands were tied behind her back, suggesting that she was buried alive.

Liza reveals that she was at the construction site that night with local "bad boy" Ty Eddings, where they witnessed a man digging a hole with an excavator. She believes the man was Foley, but never saw his face. Kinsey confirms that Foley could not have dug the hole, as he was in jail for public drunkenness that night and working all the next day. A delay in garbage pickup due to the holiday meant that anyone could have stolen the curtains from the trash bin. Kinsey confronts Liza, who admits that Foley's treatment of Violet, along with Ty's leaving town the next day, colored her perspective.

On a final hunch, Kinsey tracks down the breeder of Violet's dog, which Daisy says was a gift, possibly from a lover. She discovers it was sold to local construction magnate Tom Padgett, who later killed her. Padgett tails Kinsey to the breeder's home and attacks her on a lonely country road. Kinsey shoots him to death in self-defense.

Interspersed throughout the main narrative are several flashback chapters depicting the events leading up to Violet's disappearance.

== Reviews ==
In December 2005, this novel topped The New York Times best-seller list for hardcover fiction. By December 2006, there were 1.2 million copies in print.
