= "U" Is for Undertow =

2009 novel by Sue Grafton

- First edition cover
- Author: Sue Grafton
- Language: English
- Series: Alphabet Mysteries
- Genre: Mystery fiction
- Published: 2009 (G.P. Putnam's Sons)
- Publication place: United States
- Media type: Print (hardcover)
- Pages: 416 first edition
- ISBN: 978-0-399-15597-0
- OCLC: 311777740
- Preceded by: "T" Is for Trespass
- Followed by: "V" Is for Vengeance

"U" Is for Undertow is the 21st novel in the "Alphabet" series of mystery novels by Sue Grafton. It features Kinsey Millhone, a private eye based in the fictional Santa Teresa, California.

The novel, set in 1988, finds Kinsey investigating the disappearance of a 4-year-old girl in 1967 and the narrative weaves between both time periods. The novel has reached the top position on several best-seller lists.

== Plot summary ==
In April 1988, Kinsey Millhone is hired by a young man named Michael Sutton to investigate a memory he has which may shed light on an unsolved kidnapping. Sutton explains that in 1967, a four-year-old girl named Mary Claire Fitzhugh was abducted from his neighborhood. Sutton claims that two days later, on his sixth birthday, he talked to two men burying something in the woods. A police dig at the burial site uncovers only the body of a dog. Michael suggests that, since the men knew they were being watched, they substituted the dog's corpse for the girl's, but Michael's sister Diana warns Kinsey that Michael is easily influenced and his memory is unreliable.

Kinsey traces the dog tag to its owner, who tells him the dog was euthanized. She visits Walter McNally, the veterinarian who performed the euthanasia, and McNally corroborates the story.

Kinsey learns that another local girl, Rain Unruh, had been kidnapped in a similar fashion just before Mary Claire. Kinsey talks to Rain's grandmother, Deborah, who believes that her son Greg and his girlfriend Shelly were behind both kidnappings. Greg and Shelly were hippies and drug addicts who left Rain with Deborah and her husband Patrick, only to "kidnap" their own daughter when they were in need of money. Patrick paid the ransom and Rain was returned unharmed. Deborah speculates that, still needing money, they kidnapped Mary Claire.

Michael's family finds evidence that Michael was out of town on his birthday, discrediting Michael and leaving Kinsey at a dead end. Her landlord, Henry Pitts, suggests the kidnappers may have been burying the ransom money, rather than the body.

Michael claims to have seen one of the kidnappers at an Alcoholics Anonymous meeting and gives Kinsey a description. Kinsey reluctantly follows up, only to discover the man is respected local banker Walker McNally, son of veterinarian Walter McNally. The pieces fall into place: besides having had access to the dog's corpse, Walker's past as a drug dealer would likely have put him into contact with Greg Unruh. Kinsey identifies the second kidnapper as her former classmate, Jon Corso, Walker's best friend in high school.

Walker calls Corso and says he is going to turn himself in for the kidnapping. Corso talks him into a small delay and then shoots and kills Michael. Kinsey heads to Jon's house, where she sees him leaving with suitcases, and follows him to a secluded meeting with Walker. She overhears Jon declare his intention to murder Walker and flee the country. When Kinsey reveals herself, Jon pulls a gun on her, but she shoots first and the two men are arrested. Mary Claire's body and the marked money are both recovered on Jon's family's property. It is revealed that Mary Claire died from an allergic reaction to Valium, which they used to keep her sedated during her kidnapping.

The main storyline alternates with flashback chapters exploring the histories of the characters. An additional subplot details Kinsey's discovery that her grandmother had wanted to adopt her, in a parallel to Deborah and Patrick Unruh's adoption of their granddaughter Rain.

== Critical reaction ==
Sarah Weinman of the Los Angeles Times wrote that Grafton "has produced a better book each time out, and "U" is her most structurally complex, psychologically potent book to date. Marilyn Stasio of The New York Times wrote, "So has this reliable series lost its addictive appeal? Not at all — though it's a shock to realize that the stories, set in a California coastal town in the 1980s, now read more like historical narratives than contemporary novels with a slight time lag. But it's an object lesson in disciplined storytelling to watch Grafton manipulate that time frame to broaden the story and deepen the mystery."

== Best seller rankings ==
Upon its release, "U" Is for Undertow leapt to the top of several notable best-seller lists, including those maintained by the New York Times, Publishers Weekly, and the Palm Beach Post.
