= "C" Is for Corpse =

1986 book by Sue Grafton

- First edition cover
- Author: Sue Grafton
- Language: English
- Series: Alphabet Mysteries
- Genre: Mystery fiction
- Publisher: Henry Holt and Company
- Publication date: 1986
- Publication place: United States
- Media type: Print (Hardcover)
- Pages: 243 first edition
- ISBN: 978-0-03-001888-6
- OCLC: 12665496
- Preceded by: "B" Is for Burglar
- Followed by: "D" Is for Deadbeat

"C" Is for Corpse is the third novel in Sue Grafton's "Alphabet" series of mystery novels and features Kinsey Millhone, a private eye based in Santa Teresa, California.

== Plot summary ==
The novel begins with Kinsey at the gym, rehabilitating herself from injuries sustained at the end of B is for Burglar. While there, she meets Bobby Callahan, a twenty-three-year-old who was nearly killed when his car went off the road nine months ago. He is convinced that the car crash, which killed his friend Rick, was an attempt on his life. He suspects that he may still be in danger, so he hires Kinsey to investigate. Having lost some of his memories and cognitive faculties as a result of the crash, Bobby can only vaguely articulate why he thinks someone wants to kill him, referring to some information in a red address book that he can no longer locate.

Kinsey takes the case despite little information, having taken a liking to Bobby. She meets his rich but dysfunctional family: his mother, Glen, is an heiress who is married to her third husband, Derek Wenner, whose daughter Kitty is a 17-year-old drug user and is seriously ill with anorexia. Glen has spared no expense in seeking treatment and counseling for Bobby. He is depressed further due to Rick's death, his own injuries, and the loss of his prospects at medical school. A few days later, Bobby dies in another car crash, which is attributed to a seizure while driving. Kinsey thinks this is the delayed result of the first crash and thus a successful murder. Kinsey investigates several people: Kitty stands to inherit 2 million dollars from Bobby's will; Derek insured Bobby's life for a large sum without Glen's knowledge; and Rick's parents blame Bobby for their son's death.

However, Kinsey looks elsewhere for the solution: a friend of Bobby's gives her Bobby's address book, which shows that he had been searching for someone called Blackman. Bobby's former girlfriend thought he ended their relationship because he was having an affair with someone else, and she thinks Bobby was helping a woman who was being blackmailed. Kinsey eventually finds out that the woman with whom Bobby was involved was his mother's friend, Nola Fraker. She confesses to having accidentally shot her husband, a well-known architect named Dwight Costigan, during a supposed struggle with an intruder at their home years prior. She has a blackmailer, who is in possession of the gun with Nola's fingerprints on it.

Trying to investigate further, Kinsey realizes that 'Blackman' is code for an unidentified corpse in the morgue. She finds the gun concealed in the corpse. However, while she is at the hospital, she finds the recently murdered body of the morgue assistant and realizes the killer is at the hospital. It is Nola's current husband, Dr. Fraker, a pathologist from the hospital, who is also the blackmailer. Bobby found out what Fraker was up to; but Fraker rigged the first car accident before he could do anything about it, leading Bobby to eventually put Kinsey on the trail. Soon after, Fraker cut Bobby's brake lines, leading to his fatal crash, and falsified the autopsy results to point to a seizure. Fraker traps Kinsey and gives her a disabling injection, but she manages to cosh him and escapes to a phone to call the police. In the epilogue, she describes finally discharging the debt she feels she owes to Bobby and concludes with a wish that he is at peace.

In a side plot, Kinsey's landlord and friend Henry begins a personal and business relationship with Lila Sams, newly arrived in Santa Teresa. Kinsey, rubbed the wrong way by Lila, discovers her to be a fraudster with multiple identities and turns her over to the police just as Lila is preparing to decamp with Henry's money.

== Characters ==
- Kinsey Millhone: Private detective hired by a man she meets in the gym.

== Reviews ==
Publishers Weekly reviewed the novel positively, calling it fast-paced, with quirky and believable characters, and written with a light and sure touch.

Kirkus Reviews also praised the book, saying it was the best of the series so far, and that its strongest element was Kinsey Millhone. The review took note of Grafton's "warm and swift" writing style, and said that the plot was intriguing though far-fetched.

== Awards ==
"C" Is for Corpse was awarded the 1987 Anthony Award for Best Novel at Bouchercon, the World Mystery Convention, in Minneapolis, Minnesota.
