= "P" Is for Peril =

Novel by Sue Grafton

- First edition cover
- Author: Sue Grafton
- Language: English
- Series: Alphabet Mysteries
- Genre: Mystery fiction
- Publisher: G. P. Putnam's Sons
- Publication date: June 4, 2001
- Publication place: United States
- Media type: Print (hardcover)
- Pages: 320 first edition
- ISBN: 978-0-399-14719-7
- OCLC: 45207913
- Dewey Decimal: 813/.54 21
- LC Class: PS3557.R13 P3 2001
- Preceded by: "O" Is for Outlaw
- Followed by: "Q" Is for Quarry

"P" Is for Peril is the 16th novel in the "Alphabet" series of mystery novels by Sue Grafton. The novel focuses on the disappearance of Dr. Dowan Purcell, a nursing home administrator and doctor at Pacific Meadows Nursing Home, and features Kinsey Millhone, a private eye based in Santa Teresa, California. The novel is set in 1986.

== Plot summary ==
Kinsey Millhone is hired by Fiona, the first wife of Dr. Dowan Purcell, to move along the stalled investigation by police of his disappearance. He disappeared nine weeks earlier, on September 12, 1986. The first wife is more concerned than present wife Crystal. Fiona, embittered by the breakdown of her marriage, is convinced that Dow has engineered his own disappearance, as she alleges Crystal is having an affair and admits that Dow has gone missing a couple of times before. In support of this, his passport and thirty thousand dollars seem to be missing. In contrast, Crystal, a former stripper Dow met on a trip to Las Vegas, is convinced he is dead. Not impressed either with Fiona's haughty personality or the chances of turning up something on a cold trail, Kinsey accepts the case with misgivings.

She soon finds evidence that there has been fraudulent Medicare/Medicaid activity at Pacific Meadows, the care home at which Purcell worked as medical director following his retirement from general practice. Opinions vary amongst his former colleagues and associates as to whether Purcell could have been responsible, whether deliberately or through administrative incompetence; but since he is missing, he is certainly a convenient scapegoat for any blame that might be assigned by the ongoing official investigation. Kinsey meets an old acquaintance in the form of Dana Glazer, formerly Dana Jaffe, now married to wealthy businessman Joel Glazer, co-director of the management company that owns Pacific Meadows. By coincidence, Kinsey's landlord Henry adds to the evidence of fraud when sorting through the finances of Rosie's recently deceased sister, Klotilde, who had stayed at Pacific Meadows. Kinsey struggles to work out whether Dow did a runner with some illegal gains, killed himself having realized he was going to be implicated, or was entirely innocent but murdered by the real perpetrator of the fraud.

In a sub-plot, Kinsey has decided it is time to leave her current rented office space at Kingman and Ives and finds her dream office space up for rental by brothers Richard and Tommy Hevener. After snapping it up with a big advance rent payment, and starting to date the attractive Tommy, Kinsey receives a shocking visit from one Mariah Talbot, who explains that the Heveners are suspects in the murder of their parents in Texas some years before. Given Kinsey's blossoming relationship with Tommy, she is hoping Kinsey will help her entrap the brothers. Kinsey is in a dilemma; ultimately, Henry carries out the entrapment himself to protect Kinsey after failing to persuade her to steer clear of it. After a dangerous showdown with the Hevener brothers, in which Richard kills Tommy with Kinsey's gun, Kinsey finds out that she was duped by Mariah Talbot; she is really the sister of the Heveners' hired accomplice, whom they are also suspected of murdering.

Meanwhile, Kinsey has become embroiled in Purcell's complex family; and a search for Crystal's tearaway teen daughter Leila leads to Kinsey's discovery of Dow's car in a lake near Fiona's property. When the car is pulled out, Dow's body is in it. Kinsey has technically done her duty to Fiona, but she still wants to know how and why Dow died. She finds that Leila was behind the missing thirty thousand dollars and that Crystal is innocent of the affair Fiona had alleged. Kinsey establishes that it is Joel Glazer and his business partner who are responsible for the Pacific Meadows fraud; Dow Purcell had uncovered it. They are not the killers, however: a bullet hole at Crystal's property implicates her. Kinsey also realizes Crystal has been having an affair with Leila's school counsellor, Anica, giving her a motive. Kinsey calls a friend who is a cop and waits for him to arrive at their property. There is no explanatory epilogue, a typical feature in the rest of the Alphabet series.

== Characters ==
- Kinsey Millhone: Private investigator who is hired by a man's first wife to learn why he has disappeared for nine weeks, and the police have no progress. He has a second wife, who is less interested in her husband's whereabouts.

== Reviews ==
Kirkus highly praised the author stating "Grafton shows she can spin a classic yarn with all the breadth of her masters, and a sharper eye for detail than any of them." On the other hand Publishers Weekly gave an opposite review stating that "Unfortunately, Grafton's evocation of the noir crime novels and styles of the 1940s, although atmospheric, doesn't make up for a lack of suspense and lackluster characters."
