= C. W. Grafton =

American crime novelist (1909–1982)

- Born: Cornelius Warren Grafton; June 16, 1909
- Died: January 31, 1982 (aged 72)
- Occupation: Author
- Relatives: Sue Grafton (Daughter)

Cornelius Warren ("Chip") Grafton (June 16, 1909 – January 31, 1982) was an American crime novelist. He was born and raised in China, where his parents were working as missionaries. He was educated at Presbyterian College in Clinton, South Carolina, studying law and journalism, and became a municipal bond attorney in Louisville, Kentucky.

The hero of his first two mystery novels (The Rat Began to Gnaw the Rope and The Rope Began to Hang the Butcher) was a lawyer named Gilmore Henry. Two lines of a nursery rhyme, The Old Woman and Her Pig were the titles of these first two novels, which suggested that other Gilmore Henry novels would follow, but none did. (A partial manuscript of a third novel, The Butcher Began to Kill the Ox, is known to exist.) Henry did not appear in Grafton's two subsequent novels.

== Honors and awards ==
The Rat Began to Gnaw the Rope won the 1943 Mary Roberts Rinehart Award. It was one of the first titles chosen to be reprinted in the Library of Congress Crime Classics series.

== Personal life ==
In World War II, Grafton served with distinction as a military deception officer in the India-Burma theater. Grafton was married to Vivian Harnsberger, and they had two daughters, Sue and Ann. Sue Grafton (1940–2017) was also a writer and is famous for her "Alphabet Series" of crime novels. C. W. Grafton died on January 31, 1982, at the age of 72. Only four months later, Sue published the first book of the series.

C. W. Grafton's law partner, Spencer Harper Jr., named his younger son Grafton Sharpe Harper after him.

== Bibliography ==
- The Rat Began to Gnaw the Rope (1943)
- The Rope Began to Hang the Butcher (1944)
- My Name Is Christopher Nagel (1947)
- Beyond a Reasonable Doubt (1950)
