= Betty Pat Gatliff =

American forensic artist (1930–2020)

- Gatliff, pictured in 1980 reconstructing the facial features of an unidentified victim of John Wayne Gacy
- Born: August 31, 1930; El Reno, Oklahoma, U.S.
- Died: January 5, 2020 (aged 89); Oklahoma City, Oklahoma, U.S.
- Education: Oklahoma College for Women
- Occupation: Forensic artist

Betty Patricia Gatliff (August 31, 1930 – January 5, 2020) was an American pioneer in the field of forensic art and forensic facial reconstruction. Working closely with forensic anthropologist Dr. Clyde Snow, she sculpturally reconstructed faces of individuals including the Pharaoh Tutankhamun, President John F. Kennedy, and the unidentified victims of serial killer John Wayne Gacy.

== Early life ==
Gatliff was born in El Reno, Oklahoma and resided in Norman, Oklahoma. Her father was an architect and carpenter, and her mother was a homemaker and an accomplished quilter. She studied Mathematics and Art at Oklahoma College for Women (now the University of Science and Arts of Oklahoma), where she received a Bachelor of Arts degree in 1951.

== Career ==
She worked briefly as a draftsman for Phillips Petroleum Company before entering the civil service where she worked for 27 years as an illustrator for the Navy and the Federal Aviation Administration (FAA).

In 1967, anthropologist Dr. Clyde Snow and Gatliff worked at the Federal Aviation Administration in Oklahoma City. Snow recommended that Gatliff learn the techniques described in Wilton M. Krogman's book The Human Skeleton in Forensic Medicine (1962). Snow was able to identify the ancestry, gender and approximate age of a skull, while Gatliff used her art training to create a likeness of a face based on the skull and other scientific information. Working with Snow, Gatliff created a sculpture directly on the skull of an unidentified young man which led to his identification. The success of this early collaboration formed the foundation of the use of facial reconstruction from the skull in the United States. Together they developed the Gatliff/Snow American Tissue Depth Method. This method encompassed the work of other researchers which defines numerous "landmarks" on the skull and determines an average tissue depth for each location. The height of each landmark was determined by tables created by Snow and other forensic anthropologists' research, factoring in age, gender and ancestry. Gatliff drew on ophthalmology, dentistry and cranio-facial anatomy to render her sculptures.

In 1978, the United States House Select Committee on Assassinations began an investigation into the murder of President Kennedy. Gatliff created life-sized models of Kennedy's head for use in trajectory tests.

Also in 1978, John Wayne Gacy was arrested for the serial killings of 33 young men and boys in Illinois. Twenty-nine individual remains were found under Gacy's property, with 24 of the victims positively identified at the time. In 1980, Gatliff created the clay facial reconstructions of the other nine unidentified victims. Four of the unidentified victims have since been identified.

In 1979, Gatliff retired from the civil service to found the SKULLpture lab.

Working with Snow, Gatliff reconstructed the face of Tutankhamun that was featured in Life (1983) and National Geographic World (1985).

Gatliff was a technical consultant on the television series Quincy, M.E., creating forensic art reconstructions for the show, in which her hands were featured sculpting. Gatliff also contributed her forensic art techniques to the film Gorky Park.

Gatliff taught her techniques at the FBI Academy, Scottsdale Artists' School in Arizona, Cleveland Institute of Art in Ohio, and the University of Oklahoma.

Gatliff died in Oklahoma City on January 5, 2020, following a stroke.
