= Choppy =

Choppy may refer to:

== People ==
- Choppy Warburton (James Edward Warburton, 1845–1897), an English runner and cycling coach
- Baeden Choppy (born 1976), an Australian hockey player
- Chris Close (born 1959), known as Choppy, an Australian rugby league player

== Helicopters ==
- Adams-Wilson Choppy, a homebuilt helicopter
  - Showers Skytwister Choppy, an updated version

== See also ==
- Choppy and the Princess or Princess Knight, a Japanese manga series
