= Triumph Thunderbird =

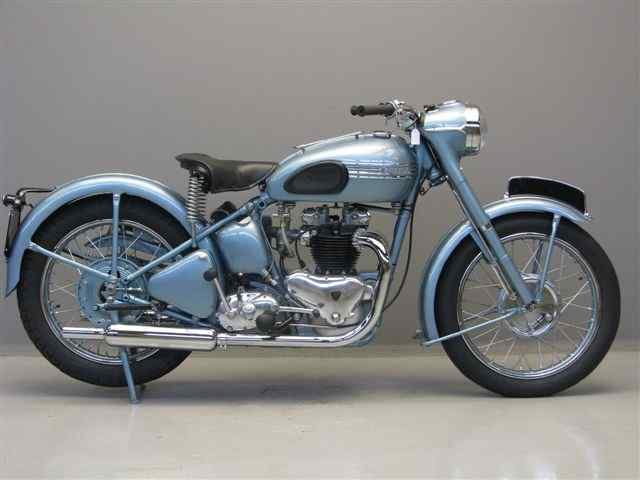
- 1950 Triumph 6T Thunderbird
- Manufacturer: Triumph Engineering Co Ltd
- Also called: 6T, TR65
- Production: 1949–1966
- Predecessor: Speed Twin
- Engine: Four-stroke Parallel-twin
- Power: 34 bhp (25 kW) at 6300 rpm
- Transmission: Four speed
- Wheelbase: 55 in (1,397 mm)
- Dimensions: W: 27.5 in (698 mm)
- Seat height: 31.5 in (800 mm)
- Weight: 385 lb (175 kg) (dry); 397 lb (180 kg) (wet)
- Related: Tiger T110

The Triumph Thunderbird is a British motorcycle that was introduced by Triumph in 1949 and produced in many forms until 1966. The name was reused three more times for new and distinct Triumph models.

== Original Triumph: 6T Thunderbird ==
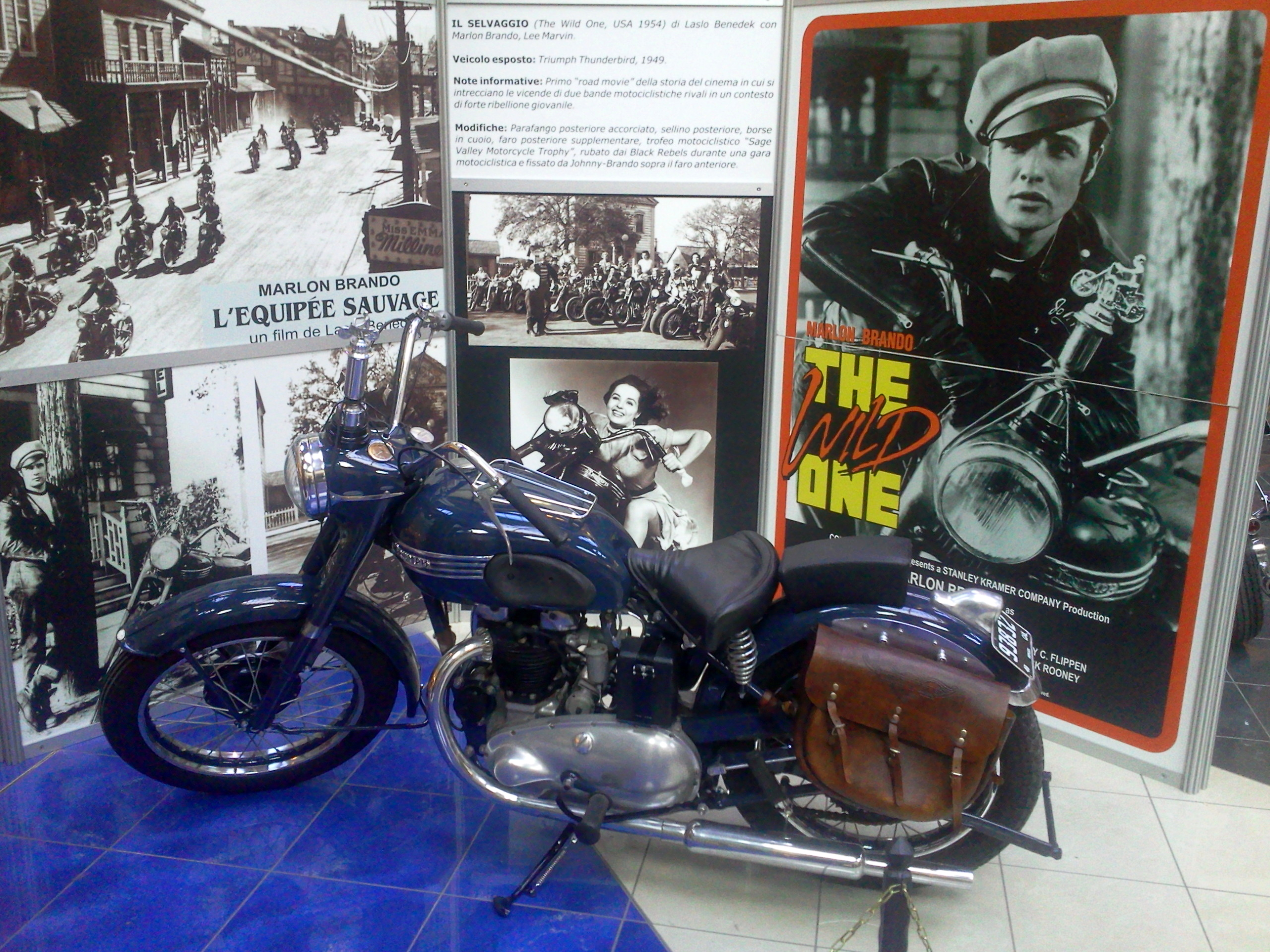
Replica of Marlon Brando's mildly customised 1950 6T Triumph Thunderbird from The Wild One, surrounded by publicity stills from the film

To capture the American market, the 6T Thunderbird used a variant of the earlier Speed Twin's parallel twin engine, bored out from 500 cc to 650 cc to give the added horsepower American customers demanded. The concept of enlarging the Speed Twin, the Thunderbird name and its 'paper dart' logo were thought up by managing director Edward Turner on one of his regular trips to Triumph's operations in the USA. The 'paper dart' logo was embossed onto the chain case cover on Thunderbirds from 1955 to 1962 and can be seen upon closer examination on the supplied photograph of the 1962 model. Previously, it appeared as a decal on the headlamp nacelle.

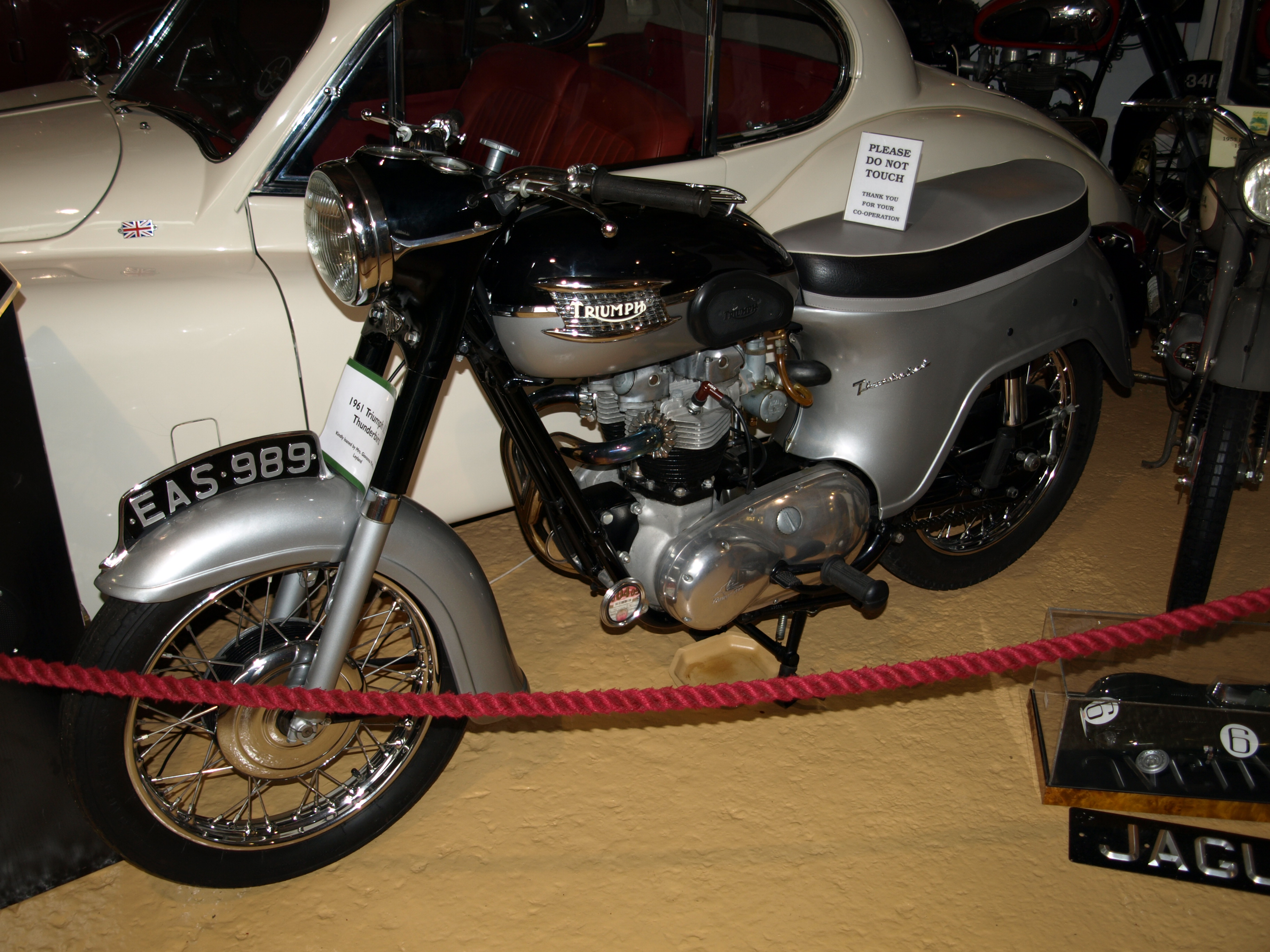
1962 Triumph Thunderbird, the last with the 'pre-unit' engine. Note the nacelle, the merged exhaust system and the full version of the unpopular bathtub rear fairing.

The 6T Thunderbird was launched publicly at Montlhéry near Paris, where three standard-production bikes were ridden around a circuit by a team of riders who between them averaged a speed of 92 mph (148 km/h) over a distance of 500 miles (800 km). All three machines were ridden to the circuit and back to the Meriden factory.

Triumph obtained further lasting publicity with Marlon Brando's 1953 motion picture The Wild One, in which he rode a 1950 6T Thunderbird. The book Triumph Motorcycles In America, includes a reproduction of a letter from Triumph's importers objecting to the film's producers using the Thunderbird in a film about rowdy motorcycle gangs.

From 1960, the Thunderbird acquired Turner's rear fairing nicknamed the 'bathtub' on account of its shape. This unpopular feature, dropped quickly in the USA market, remained in ever-abbreviated forms for the home market until disappearing altogether for the final year of production, 1966. Before then, in 1963, the Thunderbird, along with Triumph's other 650 cc models, was given the Turner-designed unit engine. Throughout this time, however, the Thunderbird retained its distinctive nacelle. A 1966 Thunderbird was prominently used by the leads in the popular 2006 romance film, Once.

== Triumph Meriden co-operative: TR65 Thunderbird ==
The Triumph worker's co-operative at the Meriden factory re-introduced the Thunderbird model name to their range in April 1981. The Triumph TR65 Thunderbird 650 cc parallel-twin was a short-stroke version of the 750 cc T140 Bonneville engine and was the cheapest model in Triumph's range with budget features such as a drum rather than disc rear brake, the absence of a tachometer, a merged exhaust system, painted rather than polished alloy and economy Dunlop Gold Seal tyres. Moreover, whereas Triumph's 750cc range had electronic ignition, the TR65 was fitted with contact breaker points. Respecting its lineage, the model retained the Turner-designed 'paper dart' logo on its side panels but with a different, updated 'Thunderbird' script. The TR65 was priced upon introduction at £1,829.82. The economy finish was upgraded for 1982 'export' models although the contact breaker points and drum rear brake remained.

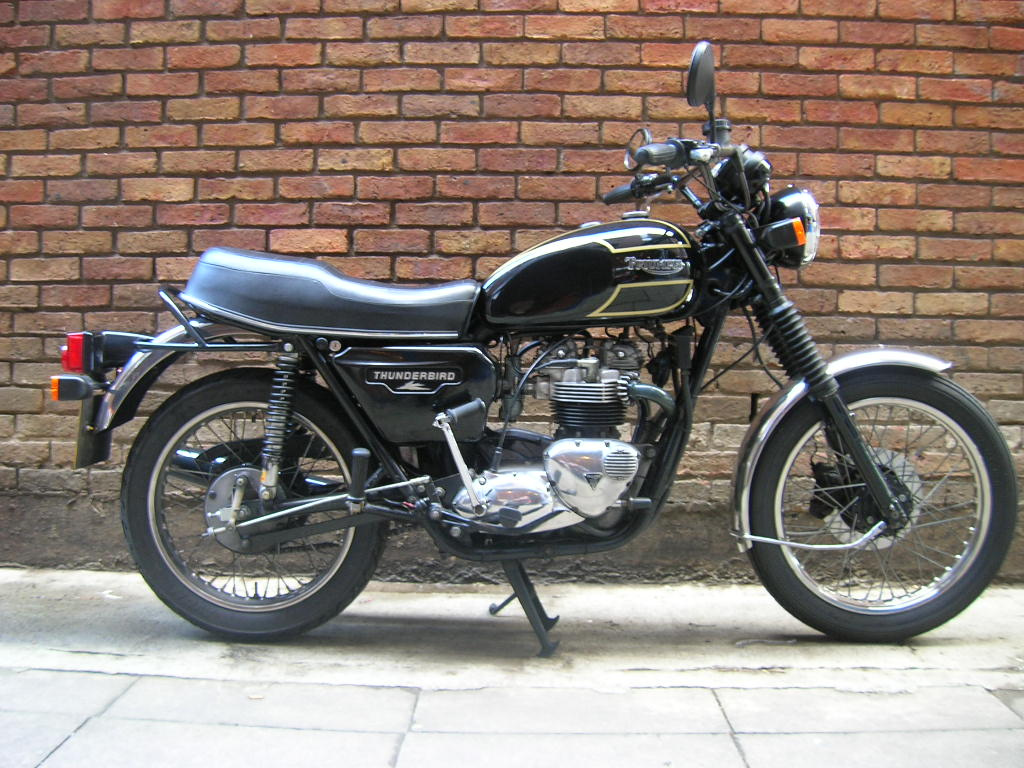
1983 Triumph Thunderbird with merged exhaust system. By then, polished alloy or chromed parts replaced the budget satin black engine finish on the initial 1981 model specification.

A trail version of the TR65, the TR65T, was also introduced in 1981 but, likely as it was priced the same as the 750 cc version, suffered poor sales and was dropped from the range in late 1982.

Planned for 1984, a custom-styled and further sleeved-down TR60 600 cc Thunderbird was exhibited but not produced, the co-operative closing down towards the end of 1983. The scheduled price for this model was £2,181. The prototype Thunderbird 600 was converted by the factory into a conventional TR65 to fulfil a Ministry Of Defence order. From the Meriden Triumph factory production records held by the Vintage Motor Cycle Club, that TR65, made on 1 June 1983, was the last 650 cc motorcycle and the second last motorcycle made at Meriden before the factory's closure that August.

== Norton-Villiers-Triumph (NVT): T180 Thunderbird III ==
In 1975, an NVT prototype 870 cc triple, the T180 Triumph Thunderbird III, was developed. This was an enlarged capacity version of the Triumph T160, but the T180 did not reach production. NVT passed on the prototype to the Meriden co-operative which also chose not to proceed to production despite experimenting with installing the engine in their oil-bearing frame.

== Triumph Hinckley: T309RT Thunderbird (triple) ==
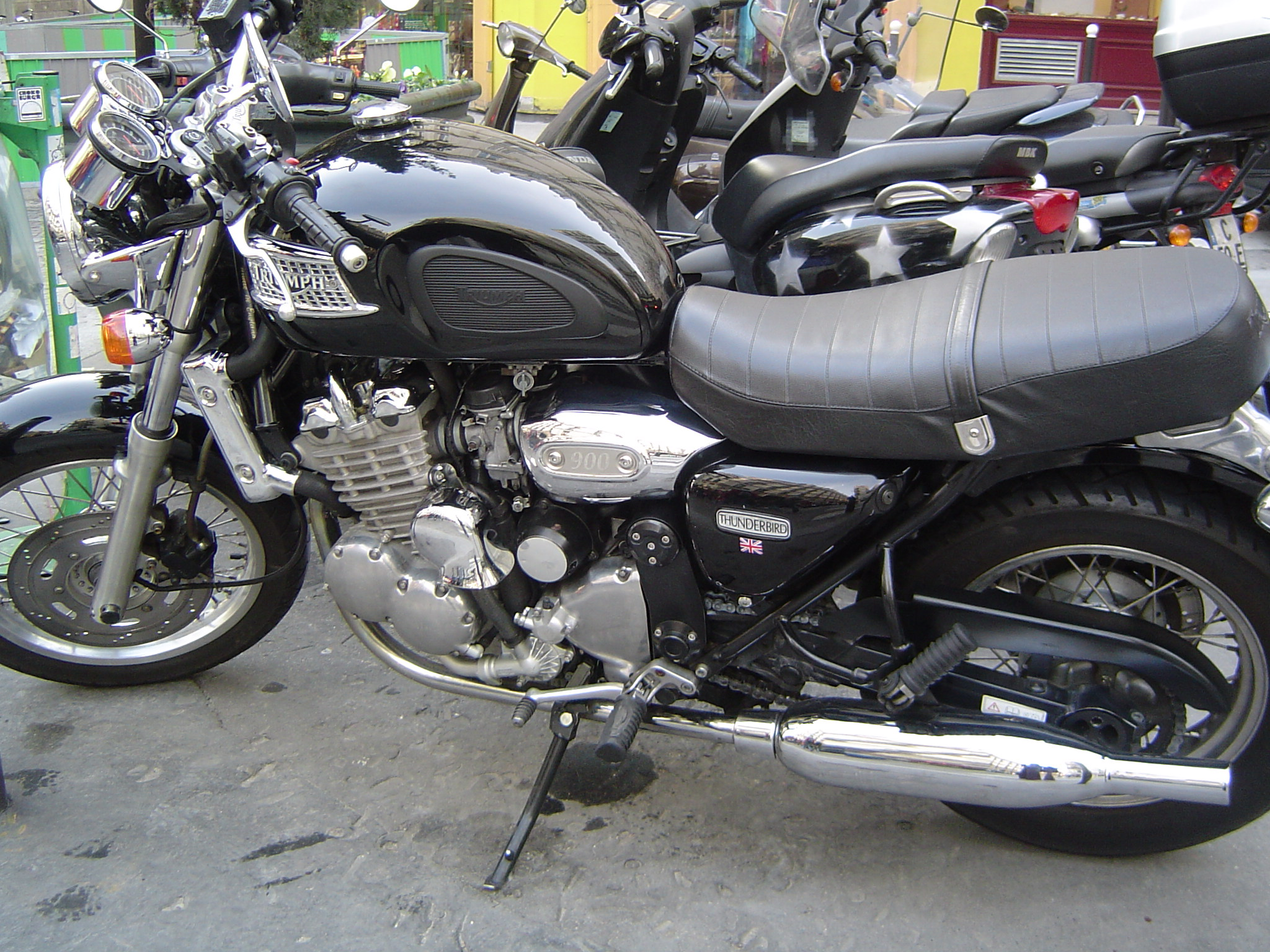
Triumph 900 Thunderbird

The new Triumph company based at Hinckley introduced the Triumph Thunderbird 900 in late 1994. Coded T309RT, the new Thunderbird was instrumental in Triumph's successful re-entry into the US market.

The 'Thunderbird' name and retro styling recalls the original Triumph company's golden years of the 1960s. It was the first "classic" Triumph to be produced by the resurgent company. The engine, redesigned to give a period look and de-tuned for more torque at lower rpm, was a variant of the 885 cc triple engine. Peak power was down to 69 bhp (51 kW) from 98 bhp (73 kW).

Several variants of the Thunderbird were produced, Triumph T309TT Legend, Triumph T309RC Adventurer, and the Triumph T309RD Thunderbird Sport, which produced a claimed 82 bhp. The Thunderbird was produced until 2003 and the Thunderbird Sport until 2004.

Hinckley also produced an accompanying clothing range consisting of sew-on patches, leather jacket and ankle boots, all featuring Edward Turner's original 'paper-dart' Thunderbird logo.

A 1995 model received great exposure when it featured in publicity photos for the film Barb Wire with its then-high-profile star Pamela Anderson.

== Triumph Hinckley: 1,600 cc and 1,700 cc Thunderbirds (twins) ==
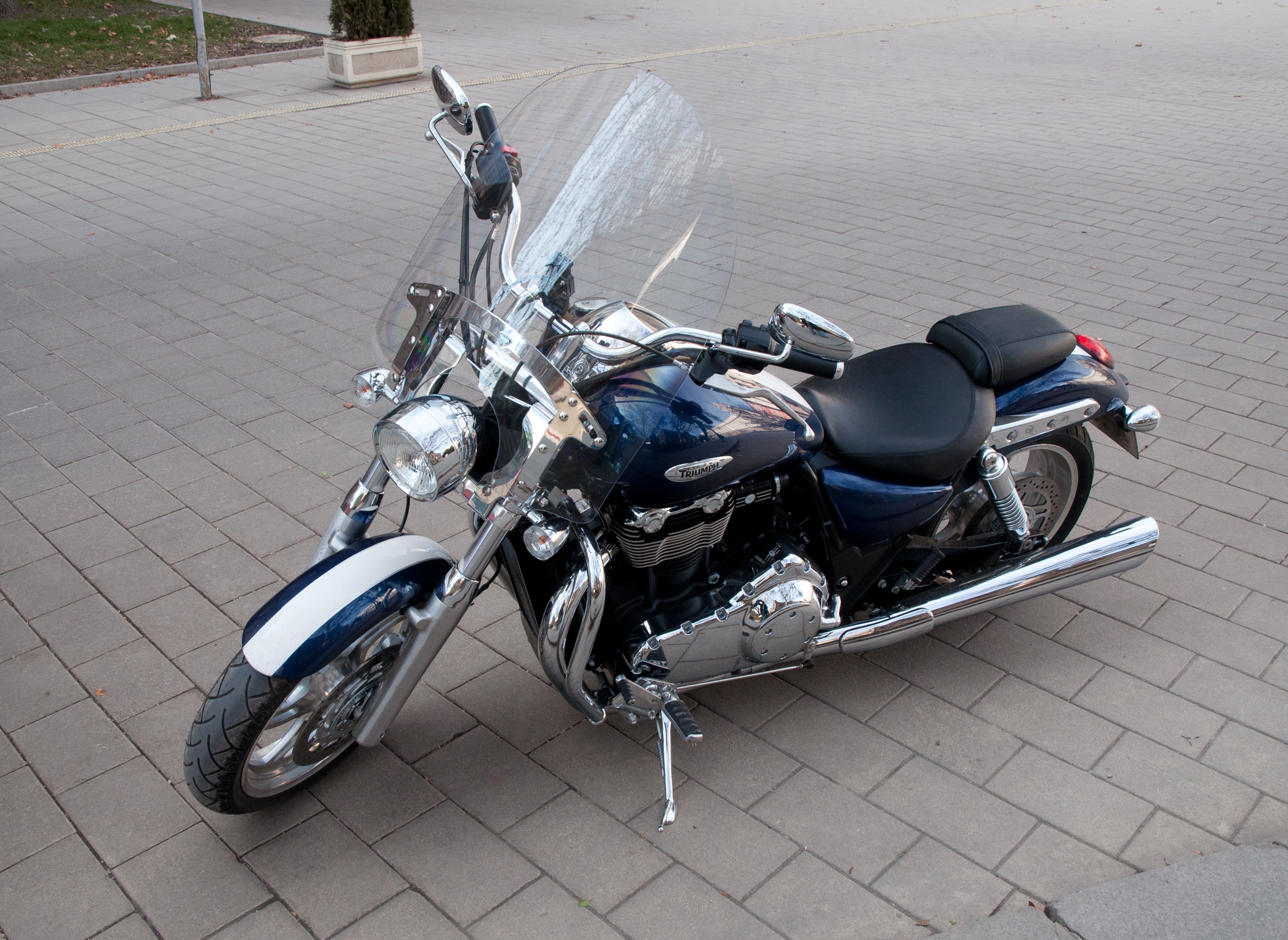
Thunderbird 1600

In July 2008, Triumph announced the new Thunderbird, a 1,597 cc (97.5 cu in) liquid-cooled parallel-twin cruiser with six gears and belt drive. The Thunderbird went on sale in June 2009. For the 2009–2010 Thunderbird model, Triumph marketed an alternative chromed clutch cover accessory featuring Edward Turner's original 'paper dart' Thunderbird logo and script which harked back to the chain case covers of the later pre-unit Thunderbird as pictured. The black-finished 2011 Thunderbird Storm model with the previously optional 1,700 cc engine fitted as standard also carries the same Thunderbird 'paper dart' logo as standard embossed above the word 'Storm' on the clutch cover. This generation of the Thunderbird was last produced for the 2019 model year.

== See also ==
- List of motorcycles of the 1940s
- List of motorcycles of the 1950s
- List of motorcycles of the 1960s
