= A/W 95 =

A/W 95 may refer to:

- A-B Helicopters A/W 95, an American helicopter design
- Vortech A/W 95, an American helicopter design
