= Showers-Aero =

American aircraft design firm

- Company type: Privately held company
- Industry: Aerospace
- Founded: circa 1992
- Founder: Don Showers
- Defunct: after 2009
- Headquarters: Milton, Pennsylvania, United States
- Products: Helicopters

Showers-Aero (also called Ben Showers Aero) was an American aerospace design firm based in Milton, Pennsylvania. The company specialized in the design of helicopters in the form of plans for amateur construction.

Ben Showers formed the company as part of his work redesigning the Adams-Wilson Choppy helicopter, a program that resulted in the single-seat Showers Skytwister or "Choppy". The Skytwister incorporated a new powerplant, the twin cylinder, liquid-cooled, two-stroke, dual-ignition 64 hp (48 kW) Rotax 582 powerplant with a 2.58:1 reduction drive gearbox, to replace the original A/W Choppy's motorcycle engine. The Skytwister also used a new design tail boom, cockpit and windshield. By 1998 it was reported that 200 sets of plans had been sold and 12 aircraft were flying.

== Aircraft ==
Summary of aircraft built by Showers-Aero
Model name	First flight	Number built	Type
Showers Skytwister Choppy	1992	12 (1998)	Single seat helicopter
