= Triumph Legend 964cc =

Hand crafted British motorcycles

Triumph Legend
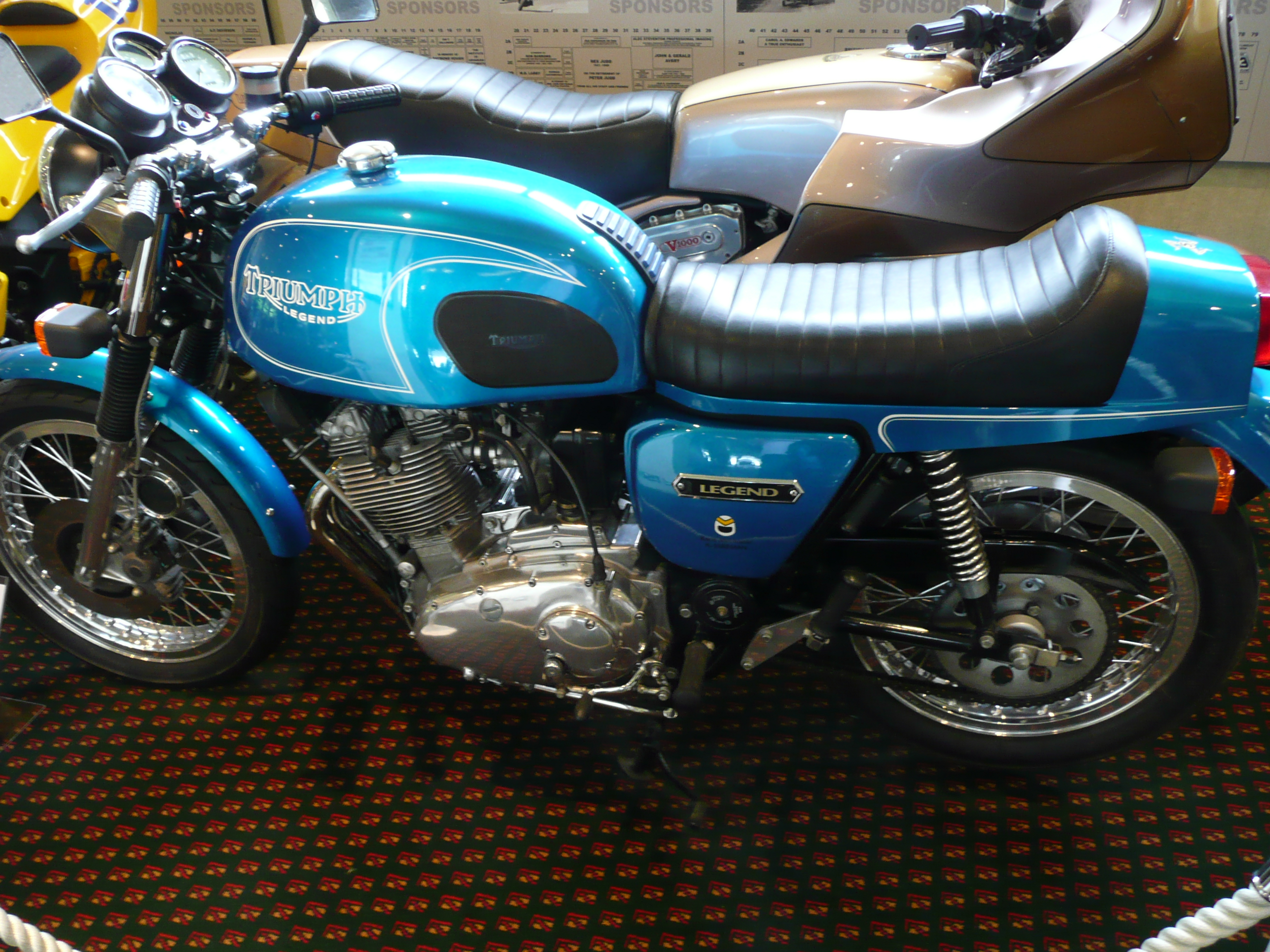
- Three cylinder Triumph Legend motorcycle at the UK National Motorcycle Museum
- Manufacturer: L.P. Williams
- Production: 1983-1992
- Engine: 964 cc (58.8 cu in) and 741 cc (45.2 cu in), triples
- Transmission: 5-speed manual

The Triumph Legend 964cc and Legend 741cc are British motorcycles developed by Les Williams, the former Triumph racing manager.

After the commercial demise by 1975 of Triumph at Meriden Works and Norton Triumph (Andover) together with the closure of the Triumph race shop, L.P. 'Les' Williams established a private business catering for spare parts and performance upgrades for the BSA and Triumph triples.

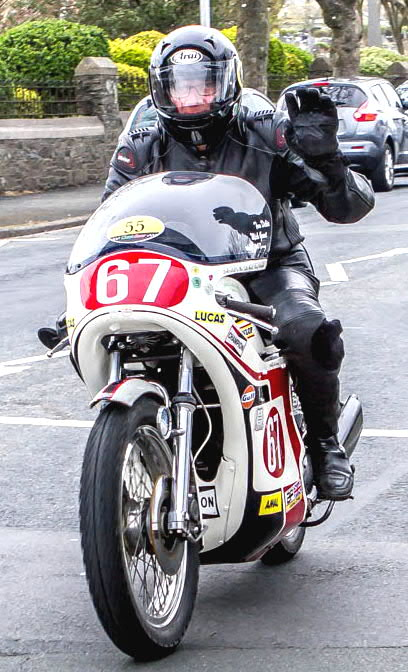
A Slippery Sam replica, part of a tribute ride-out following Geoff Duke's funeral cortege leaving from the TT Grandstand, Isle of Man, in 2015

He also created replicas of Slippery Sam, a road race machine and five-time TT race winner in the production-class which retained road equipment.

Whereas Slippery Sam was race-styled with road equipment, Williams developed a new model with updated equipment, styled as a general sports-tourer with single/dual seat options. The "Legend" models were specials, each based on rebuilt complete donor T160V Triumph Trident machines, using three cylinder pushrod engines with five-speed gearbox and electric start.

The machines were completely re-made using many new parts, but were based on earlier-registered machines from the factory's pre-1975 production which were older than the appearance suggested. Braking was uprated with a Lockheed hydraulic system using twin discs at the front and single rear.

Many were tuned for maximum performance to specific customer requirements, and between the early 1980s and 1992 a total of sixty Triumph Legends were built - although Les Williams received hundreds of orders following articles in Classic Bike (UK) and Cycle World (USA).

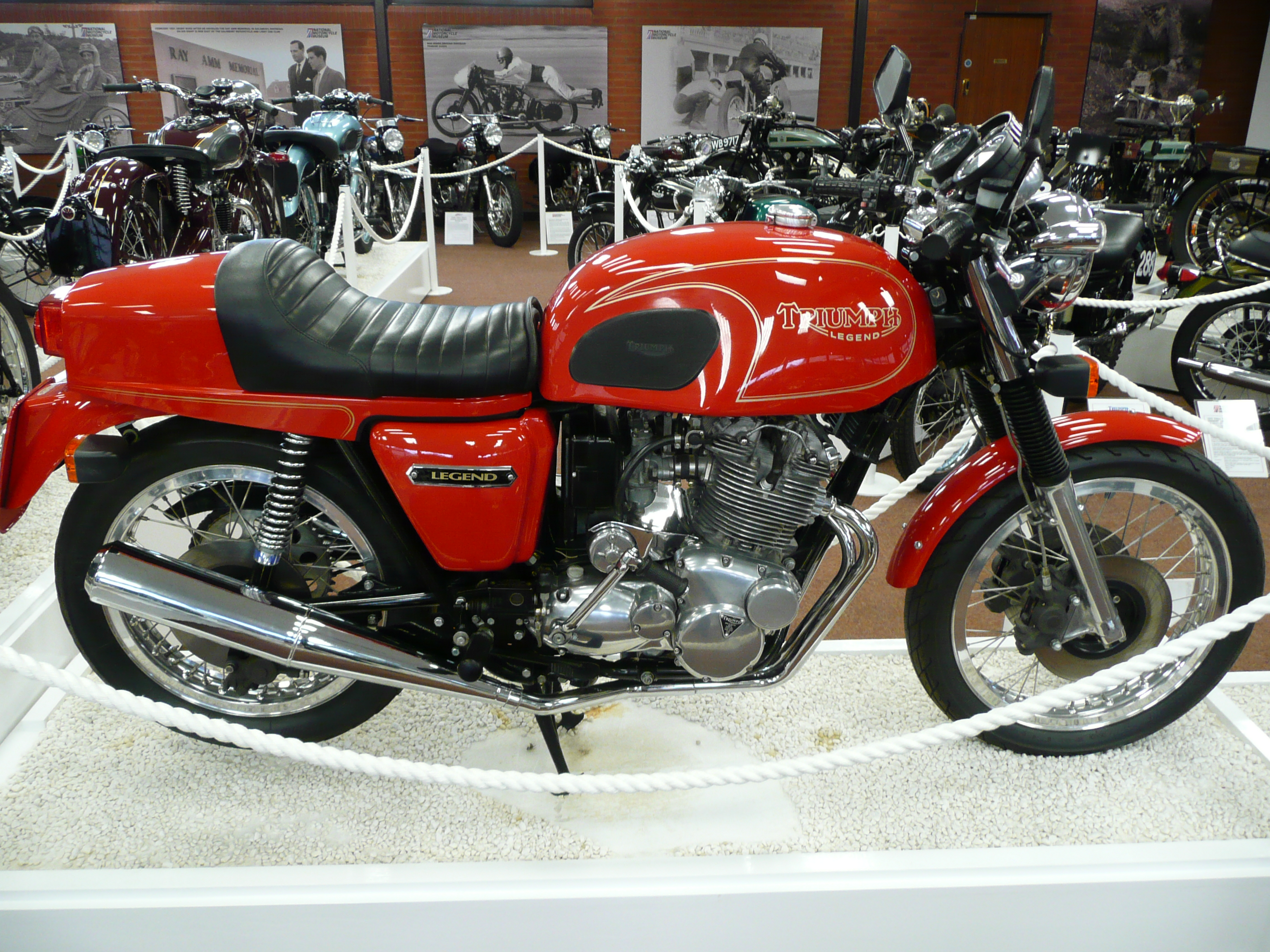
Triumph Legend 741 cc

The Triumph Legend name was later resurrected by Triumph Motorcycles Ltd, of Hinckley, England for a version using their three-cylinder 900 cc overhead camshaft engine, entitled Triumph Legend TT.

== See also ==
- Triumph Engineering Co Ltd
- Norton Villiers Triumph
- Triumph Motorcycles Ltd
- National Motorcycle Museum
