= A-B Helicopters A/W 95 =

American helicopter

A/W 95

General information
- Type: Helicopter
- National origin: United States
- Manufacturer: A-B Helicopters
- Status: Plans not longer available (2012)
- Number built: at least two

History
- Developed from: Adams-Wilson Choppy
- Variants: Vortech A/W 95

The A-B Helicopters A/W 95 is an American helicopter, produced by A-B Helicopters in the form of plans for amateur construction.

By 2012 the A-B Helicopters website had been taken down and plans are no longer available.

The design was developed into the Vortech A/W 95 and plans for that version remain available from Vortech.

== Design and development ==
The A/W 95 is a development of the Adams-Wilson Choppy, which the A/W designation acknowledges. The A/W 95 was designed to comply with the US Experimental Amateur-built rules, since the empty weight is too heavy for the FAR 103 Ultralight Vehicles rules, which stipulates a maximum empty weight of 254 lb (115 kg). The aircraft has a standard empty weight of 271 lb (123 kg). It features a single main rotor, a single-seat open cockpit without a windshield, skid landing gear and a twin cylinder, air-cooled, two-stroke, dual-ignition 50 hp (37 kW) Rotax 503 engine.

The aircraft fuselage is an open frame made from bolted-together and gusseted aluminum tubing. Its 19.5 ft (5.9 m) diameter two-bladed extruded aluminum rotor has a chord of 7 in (17.8 cm) and employs a symmetrical airfoil. The transmission is constructed from a belt and chain mechanism. With its standard empty weight of 271 lb (123 kg) and a gross weight of 490 lb (222 kg), the useful load is 219 lb (99 kg). Fuel tank capacity is 5 U.S. gallons (19 L; 4.2 imp gal), rendering a full-fuel payload of 189 lb (86 kg).

While the A/W 95 is primarily plans-built, during the time that A-B Helicopters was in business some pre-fabricated parts were available.

== Operational history ==
By January 2013 two examples had been registered in the United States with the Federal Aviation Administration.

== Specifications (A/W 95) ==
Data from Bayerl

General characteristics

- Crew: one
- Airfoil: symmetrical
- Empty weight: 271 lb (123 kg)
- Gross weight: 489 lb (222 kg)
- Fuel capacity: 5 U.S. gallons (19 L; 4.2 imp gal)
- Powerplant: 1 × Rotax 503 two cylinder, air-cooled, two stroke aircraft engine, 50 hp (37 kW)
- Main rotor diameter: 19 ft 6 in (5.94 m)

Performance

- Maximum speed: 65 mph (104 km/h, 56 kn)
- Cruise speed: 60 mph (97 km/h, 52 kn)

== See also ==
- Showers Skytwister Choppy
- Vortech A/W 95
