= Strap-on =

Strap-on can refer to:

- Strap-on booster, a rocket motor which is used and then discarded
- Strap-on dildo, a sex toy
- Strap-on keyboard or "keytar", a keyboard instrument or MIDI controller that can be worn on a strap like a guitar
- Vortech Meg-2XH Strap-On, an American foot-launched helicopter design
