= Triumph Legend TT =

British motorcycle, made 1998–2001

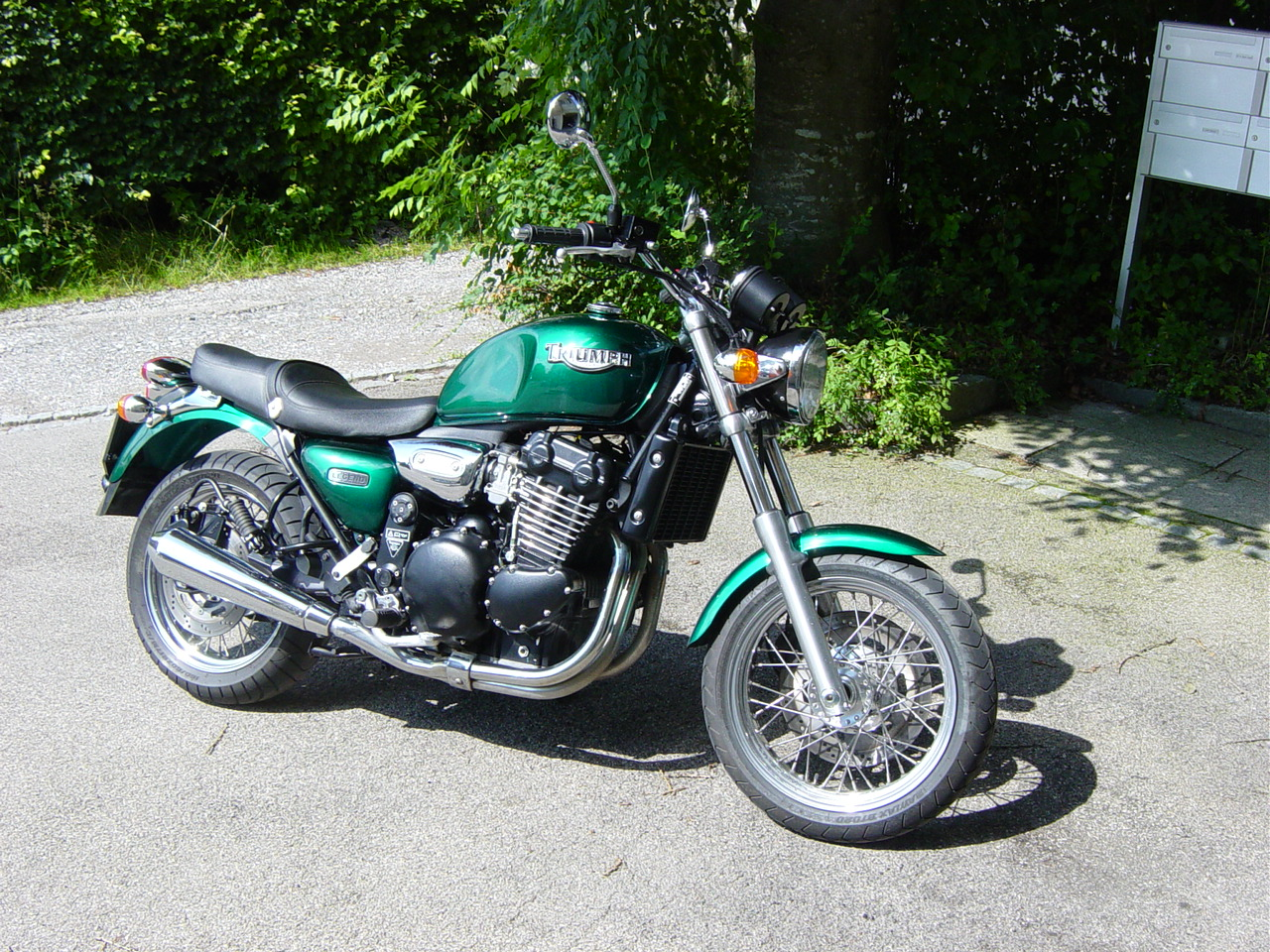
- Manufacturer: Triumph
- Production: 1998–2001
- Class: Standard
- Engine: 885 cc (54.0 cubic inches) four stroke triple
- Power: 69 hp (51 kW) @ 8,000 rpm
- Torque: 68 N⋅m (50 lbf⋅ft) @ 4,800 rpm
- Transmission: 5-speed (chain)
- Wheelbase: 1,580 mm (62 in)
- Fuel capacity: 15 L (3.3 imp gal; 4.0 US gal)

The Triumph Legend TT is a British motorcycle that was made by Triumph Motorcycles Ltd from 1998 to 2001. Based on the three cylinder liquid cooled Triumph Thunderbird 900, the priority for the new Legend TT was affordability, so the designers reduced the initial cost by producing a stripped down hotrod version, with less chrome. Design features included a satin black powder coated engine, 'teardrop' fuel tank, reverse cone megaphone silencers and spoked wheels on 17 inch chrome rims. The colour options were 'Obsidian Black', 'Cardinal Red' and 'Imperial Green'.

== Model history ==
- 1998 Triumph Legend TT launched.
- 1999 'Deluxe' version Triumph Legend TT launched with two tone paint and a lower seat height.
- 2001 Triumph Legend TT discontinued.

== See also ==
- Triumph Legend 964cc
- Triumph Engineering Co Ltd
