= Vortech G-1 =

American homebuilt helicopter

G-1

General information
- Type: Helicopter
- National origin: United States
- Manufacturer: Compcop; Vortech
- Status: Plans available
- Number built: 3 (2005)

History
- Introduction date: 1970s

The Vortech G-1, also called the Compcop G-1, is an American helicopter that was designed in the 1970s. Plans for amateur construction were originally supplied by Compcop and today are provided by Vortech.

== Design and development ==
The aircraft was designed long before the adoption of the US FAR 103 Ultralight Vehicles rules, including the category's maximum empty weight of 254 lb (115 kg), but nonetheless complies with them. The aircraft has a standard empty weight of 150 lb (68 kg) and is billed as the "World's Tiniest Homebuilt Helicopter" by the plans supplier. It features a single main rotor and tail rotor, a single-seat open cockpit without a windshield, tricycle landing gear with main wheels and nose skid and a twin cylinder, air-cooled, two-stroke, single-ignition 40 hp (30 kW) Rotax 447 aircraft engine or Kawasaki 440 snowmobile engine. The 50 hp (37 kW) Rotax 503 can also be used.

The aircraft fuselage is made from bolted-together aluminum tubing. Its main rotor is 12 ft (3.7 m) in diameter. Fuel capacity is 5 U.S. gallons (19 L; 4.2 imp gal).

The plans supplier notes this warning:

Vortech offers the G-1 plans as a curiosity for those interested in homebuilt helicopters because of its intriguing size and simplicity; however, Vortech has no direct experience with either the design or flight of this model and so cannot and does not endorse this as a proven aircraft. While people have reported building and flying this model, it appears that most of those flying versions were variations or enhancements of the original design.

== Specifications (G-1) ==
Data from Cliche, Vortech and Kitplanes

General characteristics

- Crew: one
- Width: 5 ft 8 in (1.73 m)
- Height: 5 ft 6 in (1.68 m)
- Empty weight: 150 lb (68 kg)
- Gross weight: 420 lb (191 kg)
- Fuel capacity: 5 U.S. gallons (19 L; 4.2 imp gal)
- Powerplant: 1 × Rotax 447 twin cylinder, air-cooled, two-stroke single-ignition aircraft engine, 40 hp (30 kW)
- Main rotor diameter: × 12 ft 0 in (3.66 m)
- Main rotor area: 113 sq ft (10.5 m^{2})

Performance

- Maximum speed: 80 mph (130 km/h, 70 kn)
- Cruise speed: 45 mph (72 km/h, 39 kn)
- Range: 60 mi (97 km, 52 nmi)
- Service ceiling: 10,000 ft (3,000 m)
- Rate of climb: 900 ft/min (4.6 m/s)
- Disk loading: 3.72 lb/sq ft (18.2 kg/m^{2})
