= Vortech Shadow =

American homebuilt autogyro

Shadow

General information
- Type: Autogyro
- National origin: United States
- Manufacturer: Vortech
- Designer: Tyler Flight, Inc.
- Status: In production (2014)
- Number built: 4

The Vortech Shadow is an American autogyro that was designed by Tyler Flight, Inc. and produced by Vortech of Fallston, Maryland. The aircraft is supplied as a kit and also in the form of plans for amateur construction. Vortech also supplies rotor blades for the design.

== Design and development ==
The Vortech Shadow was designed to comply with the US Experimental - Amateur-built aircraft rules. It features a single main rotor, a two-seats-in side-by-side configuration enclosed cockpit with a windshield, tricycle landing gear, plus a tail caster. The acceptable power range is 150 to 230 hp (112 to 172 kW). The standard engine used is the four cylinder, air-cooled, four-stroke, dual-ignition 150 hp (112 kW) Lycoming O-320 powerplant in pusher configuration.

The aircraft fuselage is made from tubing and composites. Its two-bladed rotor has a diameter of 29 ft (8.8 m). The aircraft has a typical empty weight of 750 lb (340 kg) and a gross weight of 1,290 lb (590 kg), giving a useful load of 540 lb (240 kg). With full fuel of 12 U.S. gallons (45 L; 10.0 imp gal) the payload for the pilot, passenger and baggage is 468 lb (212 kg).

The standard day, sea level, no wind, take off with a 150 hp (112 kW) engine is 100 ft (30 m) and the landing roll is 25 ft (8 m).

The manufacturer estimates the construction time from the supplied kit as 250 hours.

== Operational history ==
By 1998, the company reported that four kits had been sold, completed, and were flying.

In January 2015, no examples were registered in the United States with the Federal Aviation Administration.

== Specifications (Shadow) ==
Data from Kitplanes

General characteristics

- Crew: one
- Capacity: one passenger
- Length: 13 ft 0 in (3.96 m)
- Empty weight: 750 lb (340 kg)
- Gross weight: 1,290 lb (585 kg)
- Fuel capacity: 12 U.S. gallons (45 L; 10.0 imp gal)
- Powerplant: 1 × Lycoming O-320 four cylinder, air-cooled, four stroke aircraft engine, 150 hp (110 kW)
- Main rotor diameter: 29 ft 0 in (8.84 m)
- Main rotor area: 660 sq ft (61 m^{2})
- Propellers: 2-bladed wooden fixed pitch

Performance

- Maximum speed: 100 mph (160 km/h, 87 kn)
- Cruise speed: 70 mph (110 km/h, 61 kn)
- Range: 170 mi (280 km, 150 nmi)
- Rate of climb: 1,500 ft/min (7.6 m/s)
- Disk loading: 2.0 lb/sq ft (9.8 kg/m^{2})

== See also ==
- List of rotorcraft
