= Vortech Kestrel Jet =

American tip-jet helicopter

Kestrel Jet

General information
- Type: Helicopter
- National origin: United States
- Manufacturer: Vortech
- Status: Plans available
- Number built: 6 (2005)

History
- Introduction date: 1980s

The Vortech Kestrel Jet is an American tip-jet helicopter that was designed in the 1980s. Kits for amateur construction were originally provided by Vortech and plans remain available.

== Design and development ==
The aircraft was designed to fit into the US FAR 103 Ultralight Vehicles rules, including the category's maximum empty weight of 254 lb (115 kg). The aircraft has a standard empty weight of 175 lb (79 kg). It features a single main rotor, a single-seat open cockpit without a windshield and skid landing gear. Power is supplied by two G8-2-20 rotor tip jets that run on propane, consuming 12 U.S. gallons (45 L; 10.0 imp gal) per hour and producing 47 lb (21 kg) of thrust each.

The aircraft fuselage is made from bolted-together aluminum tubing. Its main rotor is 24 ft (7.3 m) in diameter. Due to the lack of torque produced there is no tail rotor and instead the Kestrel mounts a circular-shaped rudder for directional control. Controls consist only of cyclic, rudder and throttle.

== Specifications (Kestrel Jet) ==
Data from Cliche, Vortech and KitPlanes

General characteristics

- Crew: one
- Length: 12 ft 0 in (3.66 m)
- Height: 7 ft 0 in (2.13 m)
- Empty weight: 180 lb (82 kg)
- Gross weight: 440 lb (200 kg)
- Fuel capacity: 10 U.S. gallons (38 L; 8.3 imp gal) of propane
- Powerplant: 2 × G8-2-20 rotor tip-mounted jet engines, 47 lb (21 kg) of thrust
- Main rotor diameter: 25 ft 0 in (7.62 m)
- Main rotor area: 491 sq ft (45.6 m^{2})

Performance

- Maximum speed: 63 mph (101 km/h, 55 kn)
- Cruise speed: 45 mph (72 km/h, 39 kn)
- Range: 60 mi (97 km, 52 nmi)
- Service ceiling: 12,500 ft (3,800 m)
- Rate of climb: 900 ft/min (4.6 m/s)
- Disk loading: 0.90 lb/sq ft (4.4 kg/m^{2})

Avionics

- none
