= Triumph Adventurer 900 =

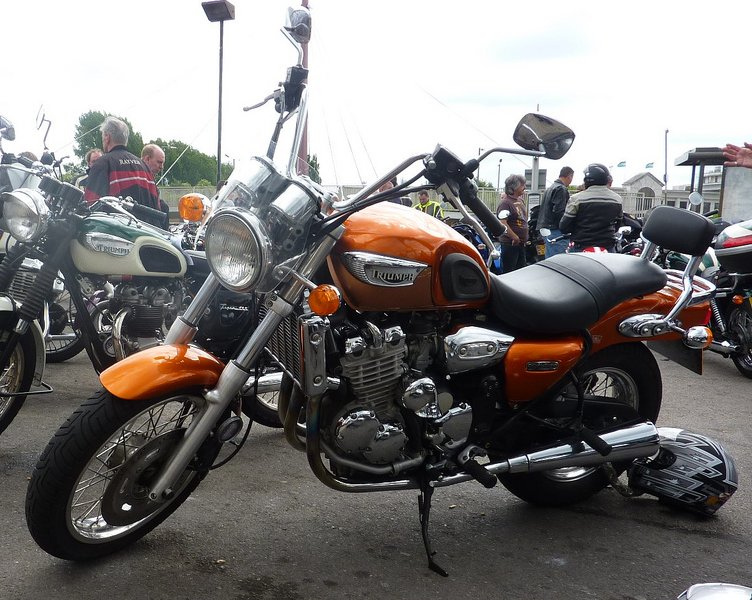
- Manufacturer: Triumph
- Production: 1996–2001
- Engine: 885 cc (54.00 cubic inches) four-stroke triple
- Transmission: 5-speed (chain)
- Wheelbase: 1,580 mm (62.2 inches)
- Seat height: 750 mm (29.5 inches)
- Weight: 220.0 kg (485.0 lb) (dry)
- Fuel capacity: 15 L (3.3 imp gal; 4.0 US gal)

The Triumph Adventurer 900 is a British motorcycle that was made by Triumph Motorcycles Ltd at the Hinckley factory. Launched in 1996, the 'Adventurer' name came from a 500 cc parallel-twin trail bike from the early 1970s. The water-cooled, 12-valve triple engine was the same 885 cc as the Triumph Thunderbird 900, as was the steel spine frame and other cycle parts including front forks, rear shock, wheels and brakes. Modifications included raised handlebars and a single seat option. The most prominent features are the large rear fender, extra chrome-plated engine, cam and radiator covers, and the megaphone-shaped silencers. The Adventurer had pre-load adjustment on the rear mono-shock suspension. It was one of the best selling bikes in the Triumph line-up.

== See also ==
- Triumph Engineering
