= Vortech Sparrow =

American homebuilt aautogyro

Sparrow

General information
- Type: Autogyro
- National origin: United States
- Manufacturer: Vortech
- Status: Production completed (2015)
- Number built: 6+

The Vortech Sparrow is an American autogyro that was produced by Vortech of Fallston, Maryland. When it was available the aircraft was supplied in the form of plans for amateur construction. Vortech also supplied rotor blades and some key parts for the design.

Available in 2005, by January 2015 the aircraft was no longer listed on the Vortech website.

== Design and development ==
The Vortech Sparrow was designed to comply with the US FAR 103 Ultralight Vehicles rules, including the category's maximum empty weight of 254 lb (115 kg). The aircraft has a standard empty weight of 254 lb (115 kg). It features a single main rotor, a single-seat open cockpit without a windshield, tricycle landing gear, plus a tail caster. The acceptable power range is 50 to 60 hp (37 to 45 kW). The standard engine used is the twin cylinder, air-cooled, two-stroke, dual-ignition 50 hp (37 kW) Rotax 503 engine mounted in pusher configuration.

The aircraft fuselage is made from metal tubing. Its two-bladed rotor has a diameter of 23 ft (7.0 m). The aircraft has a typical empty weight of 254 lb (115 kg) and a gross weight of 500 lb (230 kg), giving a useful load of 246 lb (112 kg). With full fuel of 5 U.S. gallons (19 L; 4.2 imp gal) the payload for the pilot and baggage is 216 lb (98 kg).

The standard day, sea level, no wind, take off with a 50 hp (37 kW) engine is 100 ft (30 m) and the landing roll is 50 ft (15 m).

The manufacturer estimated the construction time as 150 hours.

== Operational history ==
By 1998 the company reported that more than six kits had been sold, were completed and flying.

== Specifications (Sparrow) ==
Data from Kitplanes

General characteristics

- Crew: one
- Length: 9 ft 0 in (2.74 m)
- Empty weight: 254 lb (115 kg)
- Gross weight: 500 lb (227 kg)
- Fuel capacity: 5 U.S. gallons (19 L; 4.2 imp gal)
- Powerplant: 1 × Rotax 503 twin cylinder, air-cooled, two stroke aircraft engine, 50 hp (37 kW)
- Main rotor diameter: 23 ft 0 in (7.01 m)
- Main rotor area: 415 sq ft (38.6 m^{2})
- Propellers: 2-bladed wooden fixed pitch

Performance

- Maximum speed: 63 mph (101 km/h, 55 kn)
- Cruise speed: 60 mph (97 km/h, 52 kn)
- Range: 86 mi (139 km, 75 nmi)
- Rate of climb: 900 ft/min (4.6 m/s)
- Disk loading: 1.2 lb/sq ft (5.9 kg/m^{2})

== See also ==
- List of rotorcraft
