= Kinney HRH =

American homebuilt helicopter

HRH

General information
- Type: Helicopter
- National origin: United States
- Manufacturer: Vortech, Inc
- Designer: Robert Kinney
- Status: Plans available (2013)
- Number built: one

History
- Introduction date: 2002
- First flight: 2001

The Kinney HRH (Hot Rod Helicopter) is an American helicopter that was designed by Robert Kinney and produced by Vortech, Inc in the form of plans for amateur construction. The aircraft was first shown at Sun 'n Fun in 2002.

== Design and development ==
The HRH was designed to comply with the US experimental – amateur-built rules. It features a single main rotor, a single-seat enclosed cockpit with a windshield, skid-type landing gear and a four-cylinder, air-cooled, four-stroke, 165 hp (123 kW) Subaru EJ25 automotive engine. It is the high power to weight ratio that gives the aircraft its name.

The aircraft fuselage is made from a mix of welded 4130 steel tube and bolted-together aluminum tubing, with a composite cabin shell. Its 25 ft (7.6 m) diameter two-bladed Waitman composite rotor has a chord of 8 in (20 cm). The tail rotor has a 46 in (117 cm) diameter. The aircraft has an empty weight of 1,000 lb (454 kg) and a gross weight of 1,350 lb (612 kg), giving a useful load of 350 lb (159 kg). With full fuel of 18.5 U.S. gallons (70 L; 15.4 imp gal) the payload is 239 kg (527 lb). The HRH can hover in ground effect at 7,000 ft (2,134 m) and out of ground effect at 5,000 ft (1,524 m)

== Operational history ==
By January 2013 there was one example, the 2001 prototype, registered in the United States with the Federal Aviation Administration.

== Specifications (HRH) ==
Data from Bayerl and Vortech

General characteristics

- Crew: one
- Length: 20 ft 0 in (6.10 m)
- Width: 5.55 ft (1.69 m)
- Height: 7 ft 3 in (2.21 m)
- Empty weight: 1,000 lb (454 kg)
- Gross weight: 1,350 lb (612 kg)
- Fuel capacity: 18.5 U.S. gallons (70 L; 15.4 imp gal)
- Powerplant: 1 × Subaru EJ25 four cylinder, air-cooled, four stroke automotive engine, 165 hp (123 kW)

Performance

- Maximum speed: 103 mph (166 km/h, 90 kn)
- Cruise speed: 90 mph (140 km/h, 78 kn)
- Never exceed speed: 115 mph (185 km/h, 100 kn)
- Endurance: 2 hours
- Service ceiling: 10,000 ft (3,000 m)
- Rate of climb: 790 ft/min (4 m/s)
