= Vortech A/W 95 =

American homebuilt helicopter

A/W 95

General information
- Type: Helicopter
- National origin: United States
- Manufacturer: Vortech
- Designer: Adams-Wilson
- Status: Plans available (2015)
- Number built: 6 (2005)

History
- Developed from: Adams-Wilson Choppy

The Vortech A/W 95 is an American helicopter that was designed by Adams-Wilson as the Adams-Wilson Choppy and now produced in an improved version by Vortech of Fallston, Maryland. The aircraft is supplied in the form of plans for amateur construction. Vortech also supplies rotor blades and other key parts for the design.

== Design and development ==
The A/W 95 was designed to comply with the US Experimental - Amateur-built aircraft rules, but if built lightly enough may qualify as an ultralight aircraft, under the US FAR 103 Ultralight Vehicles rules, with that category's maximum empty weight restriction of 254 lb (115 kg). The aircraft has a standard empty weight of 272 lb (123 kg).

The A/W 95 features a single main rotor, a single-seat open cockpit without a windshield, skid-type landing gear and can accept engines of 50 to 75 hp (37 to 56 kW). The standard engine used is the twin cylinder, air-cooled, two-stroke, dual-ignition 50 hp (37 kW) Rotax 503 engine. The aircraft fuselage is made from bolted-together aluminum tubing. Its two-bladed main rotor has a diameter of 19.5 ft (5.9 m). The aircraft has an empty weight of 272 lb (123 kg) and a gross weight of 500 lb (227 kg), giving a useful load of 228 lb (103 kg). With full fuel of 5 U.S. gallons (19 L; 4.2 imp gal) the payload for pilot and baggage is 198 lb (90 kg).

The manufacturer estimates the construction time as 250 hours.

== Operational history ==
By 2005 the company reported that six aircraft were completed and flying.

By January 2015 two examples had been registered in the United States with the Federal Aviation Administration, although a total of three had been registered at one time.

== Specifications (A/W 95) ==
Data from Kitplanes

General characteristics

- Crew: one
- Length: 15 ft 0 in (4.57 m)
- Empty weight: 272 lb (123 kg)
- Gross weight: 500 lb (227 kg)
- Fuel capacity: 5 U.S. gallons (19 L; 4.2 imp gal)
- Powerplant: 1 × Rotax 503 twin cylinder, air-cooled, two stroke aircraft engine, 50 hp (37 kW)
- Main rotor diameter: 19 ft 6 in (5.94 m)
- Main rotor area: 298 sq ft (27.7 m^{2})

Performance

- Maximum speed: 75 mph (121 km/h, 65 kn)
- Cruise speed: 60 mph (97 km/h, 52 kn)
- Range: 86 mi (139 km, 75 nmi)
- Rate of climb: 1,000 ft/min (5.1 m/s)
- Disk loading: 1.7 lb/sq ft (8.3 kg/m^{2})

== See also ==
- A-B Helicopters A/W 95
- Showers Skytwister Choppy
- List of rotorcraft
