= Adams-Wilson Hobbycopter =

Hobbycopter
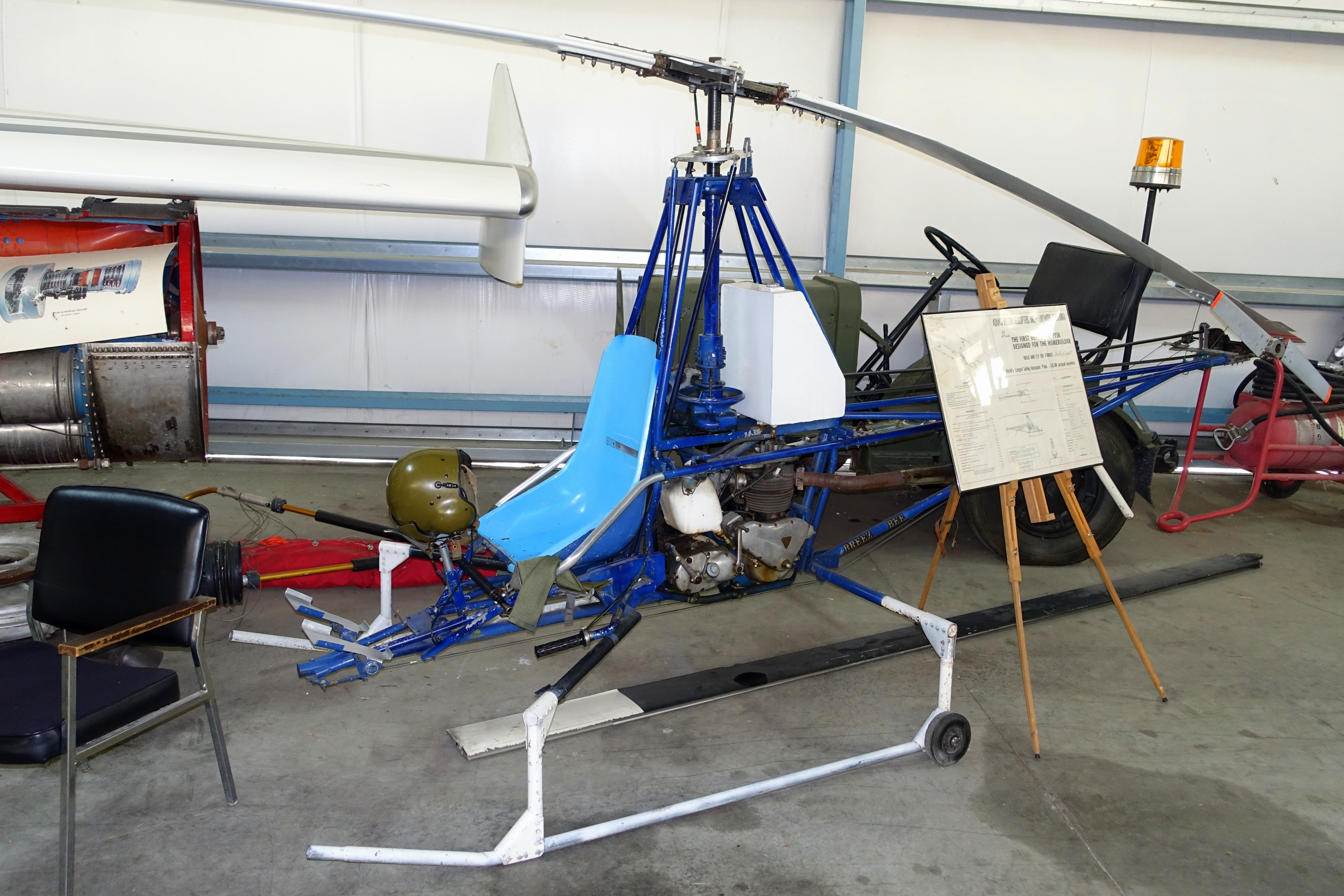
- HobbyCopter in the Oregon Air and Space Museum

General information
- Type: Single seat homebuilt helicopter
- National origin: United States
- Manufacturer: Vortech
- Designer: Adams-Wilson

History
- First flight: November 1958
- Variants: A-B Helicopters A/W 95; Vortech A/W 95; Showers Skytwister Choppy

The Adams-Wilson Hobbycopter (later named the Adams-Wilson Choppy) is a small, single-seat, open-framework helicopter designed for homebuilding, to be powered by a motorcycle engine.

== Design and development ==
The Adams-Wilson company was formed by T.G. Adams and Paul Wilson to market plans for a simple single-seat helicopter named the HobbyCopter, of which they have built a prototype. This prototype flew successfully for the first time in November 1958. Plans were first marketed in 1958 and have been revised and revived by various designers over the years.

The Hobbycopter, (also colloquially known as the Flying Triumph), was designed to use commonly found materials that were readily available to customers. The Hobbycopter was designed to use a motorcycle engine of about 50 hp (37 kW) and a variety engines have been used, including a snowmobile motor and more recently, an ultralight 2-cycle Rotax 503 engine developing 52 hp (39 kW).

The aircraft is available in the form of plans and some key parts for amateur construction from Vortech of Fallston, Maryland.

== Variants ==
Hobbycopter XH-1
The prototype of the one-man open framework homebuilt helicopter powered by a 34 hp (25 kW) Triumph motorcycle engine.
Hobbycopter 101
Production version of the XH-1 offered as a kit for $900, or as plans for $35 to homebuilders.
Hobbycopter 102
Strengthened Model 101 with 34 hp (25 kW) Triumph and a fibre-glass cockpit enclosure.

== Specifications (Hobbycopter 101) ==
General characteristics

- Crew: 1
- Length: 15 ft 0 in (4.57 m)
- Height: 6 ft 0 in (1.83 m)
- Empty weight: 300 lb (136 kg)
- Gross weight: 600 lb (272 kg)
- Powerplant: 1 × Triumph motorcycle engine 4-stroke air-cooled piston engine, 34 hp (25 kW)
- Main rotor diameter: 21 ft 6 in (6.55 m)
- Main rotor area: 363 sq ft (33.7 m^{2}) 2-bladed

Performance

- Maximum speed: 74 kn (85 mph, 137 km/h)
- Service ceiling: 8,500 ft (2,600 m)
- Rate of climb: 950 ft/min (4.8 m/s)

== See also ==
Related development

- A-B Helicopters A/W 95
- Vortech A/W 95

Related lists

- List of single seat helicopters
