= Vortech =

American aircraft manufacturer

Vortech, Inc.
- Company type: Privately held company
- Industry: Aerospace
- Founded: 1970
- Headquarters: Fallston, Maryland, United States
- Products: Kit aircraft, autogyros, helicopters, helicopter rotor blades, aircraft parts
- Owner: Prismz
- Website: www.prismz.com/helio/

Vortech, Inc. is an American aircraft manufacturer based in Fallston, Maryland. The company specializes in the design and manufacture of rotorcraft in the form of plans and kits for amateur construction. Some of their designs also comply with the US FAR 103 Ultralight Vehicles rules as well.

Founded in 1970, Vortech and its parent company, Prismz, provide plans, books, some kits and parts to enable hobbyists to construct a wide array of machines, including: helicopters, autogyros, mini-cars, trikes, scooters, wind generators, engines, boats and electroplating systems. Prismz also provides computer graphics and publishing layout services.

Vortech also manufactures its own line of helicopter rotor blades made from single-piece metal extrusions.

== Aircraft ==
Summary of aircraft built by Vortech
Model name	First flight	Number built	Type
Vortech A/W 95		6 (2005)	Single seat helicopter
Vortech Choppy		2 (2005)	Single seat helicopter
Vortech Commuter			Single seat helicopter
Vortech G-1		3 (2005)	Single seat helicopter
Vortech Hot Rod		2 (2005)	Single seat helicopter
Vortech Kestrel Jet		6 (2005)	Single seat tip-jet helicopter
Vortech Meg-2XH Strap-On			Foot-launched, single seat helicopter
Vortech Scorpion			Single seat helicopter
Vortech Scorpion II			Single seat helicopter
Vortech Skylark		5 (2005)	Single seat helicopter
Bensen B-8			Single seat autogyro
Bensen B-19			Single seat autogyro
Bensen B-20			Single seat autogyro
Vortech Shadow		4 (2005)	Two seat autogyro
Vortech Sparrow		6 (2005)	Single seat autogyro
