= Triumph Thunderbird 900 =

British motorcycle

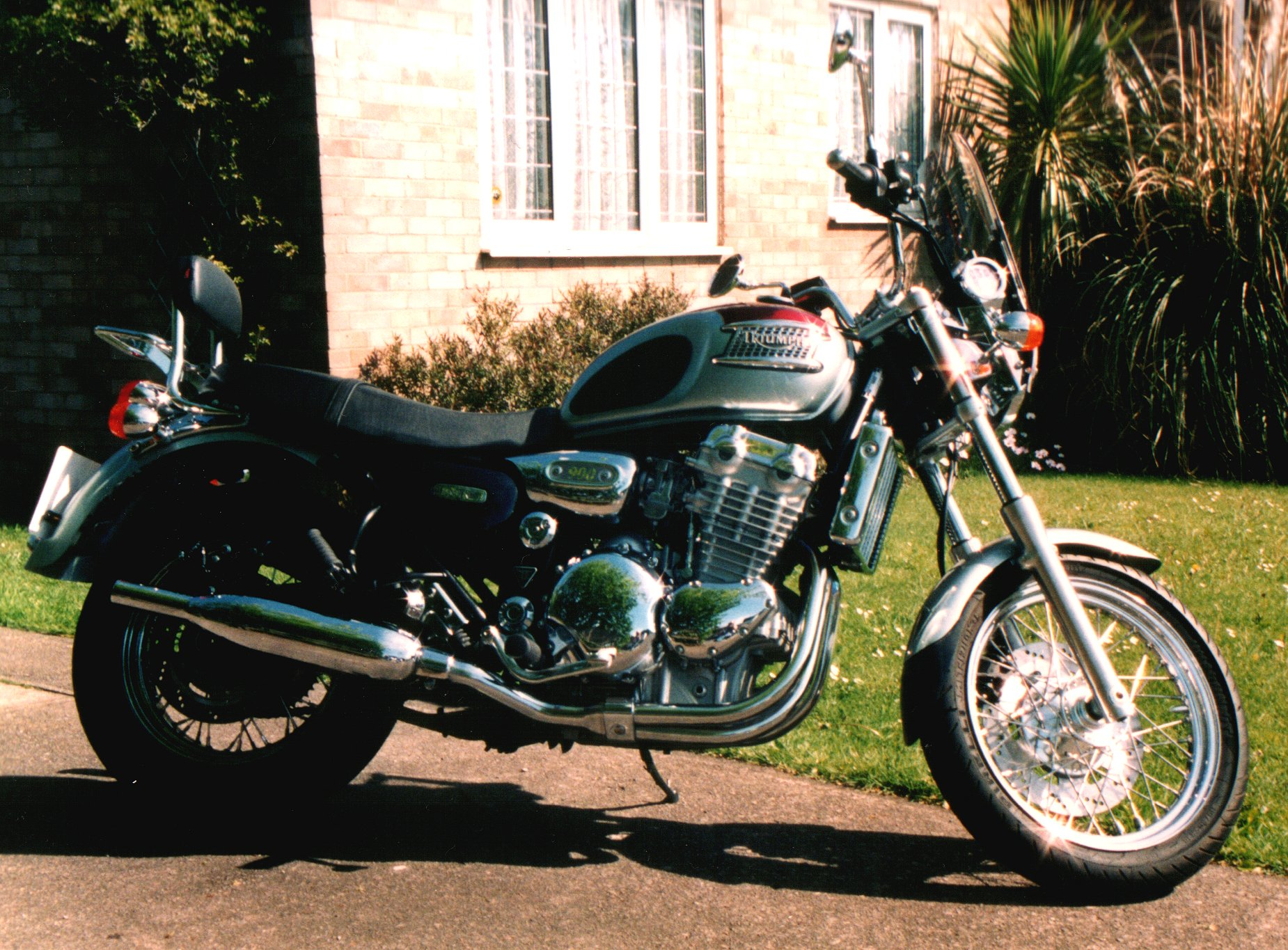
- Manufacturer: Triumph
- Production: 1995–2004
- Engine: 885 cc (54.0 cu in) four-stroke triple
- Power: 68 hp (51 kW) at 8,000 rpm
- Torque: 70 N⋅m (52 lbf⋅ft) at 4,000 rpm
- Transmission: 5-speed (chain)
- Wheelbase: 1,580 mm (62 in)
- Seat height: 740 mm (29 in) If adjustable, lowest setting
- Weight: 220 kg (490 lb) (dry)
- Fuel capacity: 15 L (3.3 imp gal; 4.0 US gal)

The Triumph Thunderbird 900 is a British motorcycle that was manufactured between 1995 and 2004 by Triumph Motorcycles at the Hinckley factory. Launched in 1995, the Triumph Thunderbird 900 was styled to create the impression of an air-cooled triple combustion chamber although the radiator up front shows it is clearly a liquid-cooled machine. Fed by three 36 mm flat slide carburettors, the engine was lively and could cope easily with all riding styles. The swinging arm was upgraded to an oval section in 1996; in 1997 chromed plastic radiator end covers and grill were provided as standard along with chromed engine cases. In 1998 a 'king and queen' seat was added as an option,

Several variants were produced, namely the Triumph Legend TT, Triumph Adventurer 900 and the Triumph Thunderbird 900 "classic" and then the Triumph Thunderbird Sport, which produced 82 bhp (61 kW), had a second front disc added, and a six-speed gearbox. Engines are the same 885cc triples. The Thunderbird was produced until 2003 and the Thunderbird Sport until 2004.

== Triumph Thunderbird Sport ==
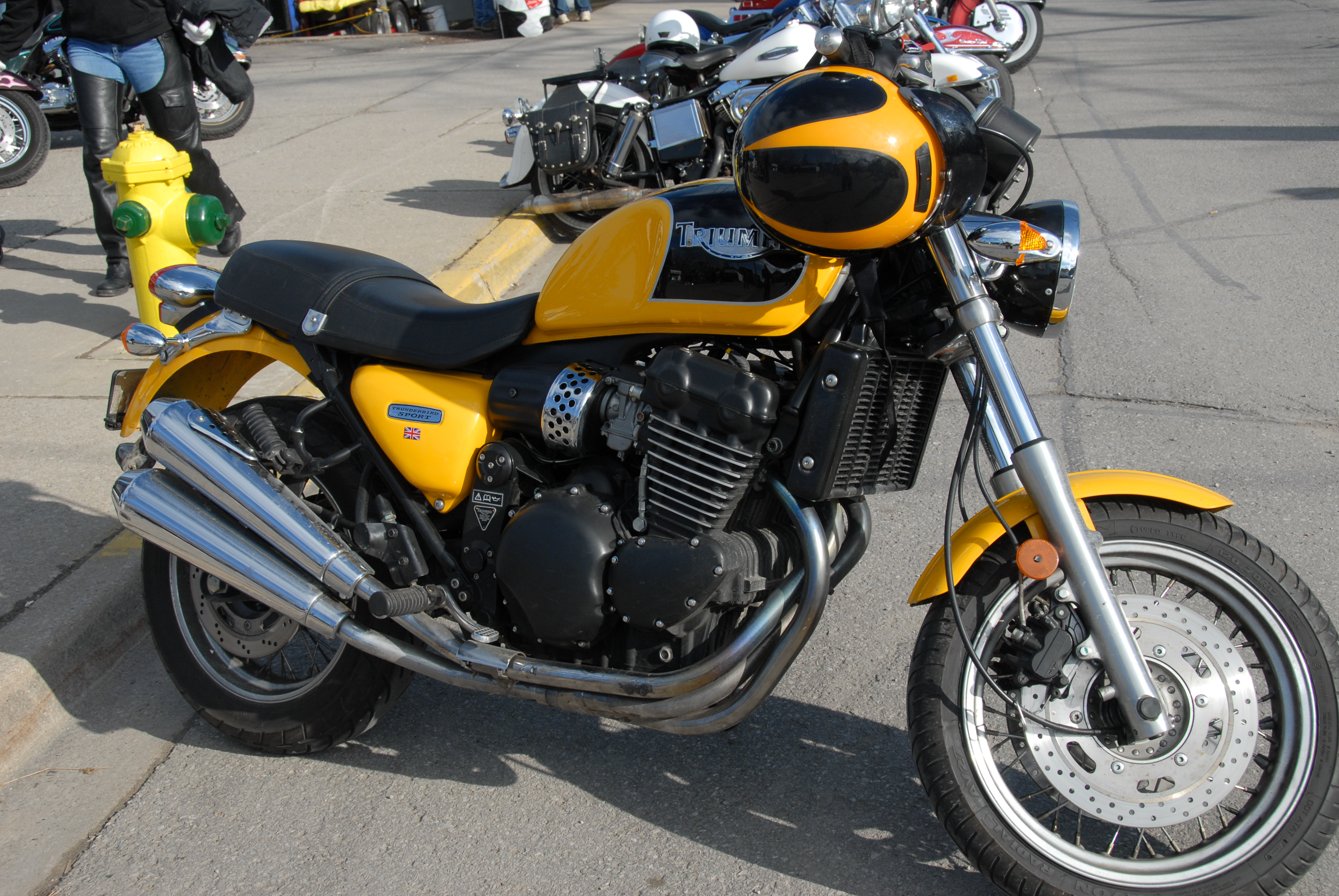
Thunderbird Sport

Introduced in late 1997, this was a more sporting version of the Thunderbird 900 with power increased to 82 hp (61 kW) at 8,500 rpm with 36mm flat side Keihin CV carburettors and six-speed gearbox.

Also included was slightly revised styling, including a 'cheese grater' air filter, twin disc front brakes and fully adjustable sports suspension, added to this were the twin silencers on the one side. Its styling was intended to recall the early 1970s Triumph X-75 Hurricane.

The six-speed gearbox was used on all later variants of the Thunderbird along with Keihin carburettors. The earlier Mikuni carburettors initially suffered from premature needle and jet wear in its first year of release; this was rectified with a factory recall soon after. All later Thunderbirds with the 150 mph (240 km/h) speedometer and Keihin carburettors should have six speed gearboxes fitted along with chrome engine cases.

== Media appearances ==
Upon its introduction, the Triumph Thunderbird received prominent press coverage due to its use by then- highly popular actress Pamela Anderson in her film, Barb Wire. Other prominent media appearances were by Hugh Laurie in British film, Maybe Baby and, with a sidecar, in the BBC TV cookery series Two Fat Ladies. The motorcycle was also a sweepstakes prize for Meat Loaf's Welcome to the Neighborhood album and the entry ticket came with the CD insert, as the bike was featured in the music video for "I'd Lie for You (And That's the Truth)".

== See also ==
- Triumph Engineering
