= Vortech Meg-2XH Strap-On =

American homebuilt helicopter

Meg-2XH Strap-On

General information
- Type: Helicopter
- National origin: United States
- Manufacturer: Vortech
- Status: Plans and kits no longer available (1998)
- Number built: 3 (1998)

The Vortech Meg-2XH Strap-On is an American helicopter that was designed and produced by Vortech of Fallston, Maryland. Now out of production, when it was available the aircraft was supplied as a kit and also in the form of plans for amateur construction. Vortech also supplied rotor blades for the design.

While listed as available early in 1998, by the end of that year the aircraft was no longer listed on the Vortech website.

== Design and development ==
The Meg-2XH Strap-On was designed to comply with the US FAR 103 Ultralight Vehicles rules, including the category's maximum empty weight of 254 lb (115 kg). The aircraft has a standard empty weight of 120 lb (54 kg). It features a single main rotor, a single fold-up seat and a rudder. The aircraft is supported by a partial frame when on the ground, but take-off and landing are both accomplished by foot and the aircraft is worn like a backpack, hence the name. The helicopter was designed to be powered by a single jet engine producing 37 hp (28 kW).

The aircraft fuselage frame is made from bolted-together aluminum tubing and has a 21 ft (6.4 m) diameter two-bladed rotor. The aircraft has an empty weight of 120 lb (54 kg) and a gross weight of 400 lb (181 kg), giving a useful load of 280 lb (127 kg). With full fuel of 5 U.S. gallons (19 L; 4.2 imp gal) the maximum pilot weight is 250 lb (113 kg).

The 5 U.S. gallons (19 L; 4.2 imp gal) fuel capacity gives the aircraft a range of 35 mi (56 km). It has a top speed of 75 mph (121 km/h) and a cruise speed of 63 mph (101 km/h).

The manufacturer estimated the construction time from the supplied bolt-together assembly kit as 30 hours.

== Operational history ==
By 1998 the company reported that three kits had been sold, were completed and flying.

== Specifications (Meg-2XH Strap-On) ==
Data from Purdy

General characteristics

- Crew: one
- Length: 7 ft 0 in (2.13 m)
- Empty weight: 120 lb (54 kg)
- Gross weight: 400 lb (181 kg)
- Fuel capacity: 5 U.S. gallons (19 L; 4.2 imp gal)
- Powerplant: 1 × jet engine , 37 shp (28 kW)
- Main rotor diameter: 21 ft 0 in (6.40 m)

Performance

- Maximum speed: 75 mph (121 km/h, 65 kn)
- Cruise speed: 63 mph (101 km/h, 55 kn)
- Range: 35 mi (56 km, 30 nmi)
- Service ceiling: 12,500 ft (3,800 m)
- Rate of climb: 1,000 ft/min (5.1 m/s)

== See also ==
- List of rotorcraft
