= Showers Skytwister Choppy =

American helicopter

Skytwister Choppy

General information
- Type: Helicopter
- National origin: United States
- Manufacturer: Showers-Aero
- Status: Plans no longer available (2015)
- Number built: 12 (1998)

History
- First flight: 1992

The Showers Skytwister Choppy is an American helicopter that was produced by Showers-Aero of Milton, Pennsylvania, introduced in 1992. Now out of production, when it was available the aircraft was supplied in the form of CAD plans for amateur construction.

== Design and development ==
The Skytwister is a modernized and updated version of the Adams-Wilson Hobbycopter, also called the "Choppy", as redesigned by Ben Showers.

The Skytwister was designed to comply with the US Experimental - Amateur-built aircraft rules. It features a single main rotor, a two-bladed tail rotor, a single-seat open cockpit with a windshield and skid-type landing gear. The standard engine used is a twin cylinder, liquid-cooled, two-stroke, dual-ignition 64 hp (48 kW) Rotax 582 powerplant with a 2.58:1 reduction drive, which replaces the original Choppy's motorcycle engine.

The aircraft fuselage is made from bolted-together aluminum tubing. Its two-bladed Fleck 2706 aluminium alloy main rotor is made as an extrusion and has a 21.50 ft (6.6 m) diameter. The tail rotor has a diameter of 36 in (91.4 cm). The aircraft has an empty weight of 320 lb (145 kg) and a gross weight of 670 lb (304 kg), giving a useful load of 350 lb (159 kg). With full fuel of 5 U.S. gallons (19 L; 4.2 imp gal) the payload for pilot and baggage is 320 lb (145 kg).

The designer estimated the construction time from the supplied plans as 300 hours.

== Operational history ==
By 1998, the company reported that 200 sets of plans had been sold and 12 aircraft were completed and flying.

By April 2015, no examples were registered in the United States with the Federal Aviation Administration, although a total of one had been registered at one time.

== Specifications (Skytwister) ==
Data from Purdy and All-Aero

General characteristics

- Crew: one
- Length: 15 ft 8 in (4.78 m)
- Width: 5 ft 8 in (1.73 m)
- Height: 6 ft 8 in (2.03 m)
- Empty weight: 320 lb (145 kg)
- Gross weight: 670 lb (304 kg)
- Fuel capacity: 5 U.S. gallons (19 L; 4.2 imp gal)
- Powerplant: 1 × Rotax 582 twin cylinder, liquid-cooled, two stroke aircraft engine with a 2.58:1 reduction drive, 65 hp (48 kW)
- Main rotor diameter: 21 ft 6 in (6.55 m)
- Main rotor area: 363 sq ft (33.7 m^{2})

Performance

- Maximum speed: 85 mph (137 km/h, 74 kn)
- Cruise speed: 65 mph (105 km/h, 56 kn)
- Rate of climb: 1,000 ft/min (5.1 m/s)
- Disk loading: 1.8 lb/sq ft (8.8 kg/m^{2})

== See also ==
- List of rotorcraft
