= Triumph Motorcycles Ltd =

UK-owned motorcycle manufacturer

Triumph Motorcycles Limited

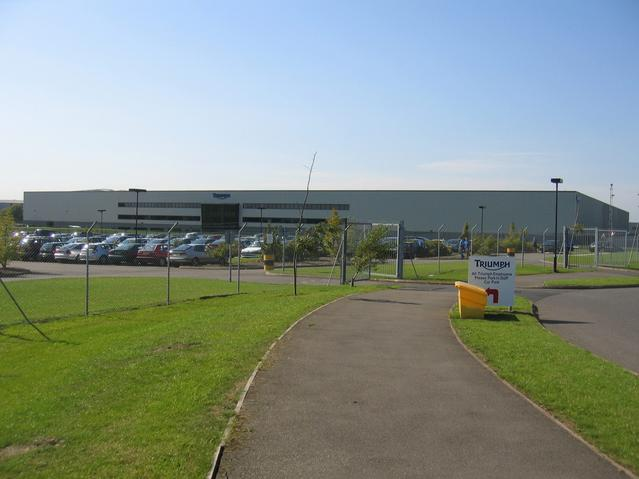
- The Triumph Motorcycle Factory at Hinckley
- Type: Private
- Industry: Automotive
- Predecessor: Triumph Engineering
- Founded: 1983; 43 years ago
- Headquarters: Hinckley, Leicestershire, England
- Key people: Nick Bloor (CEO); The Lord Jones of Birmingham (chairman); Paul Stroud (CCO)
- Products: Motorcycles; Clothing; Accessories
- Revenue: ▲£775 million (2022)
- Net income: ▲£94 million (2022)
- Number of employees: 2,000 (2017)
- Website: triumphmotorcycles.co.uk

Triumph Motorcycles Limited is the largest UK-owned motorcycle manufacturer, established in 1983 by John Bloor after the original company Triumph Engineering went into receivership. The new company, initially called Bonneville Coventry Ltd, continued Triumph's lineage of motorcycle production since 1902. They have major manufacturing facilities in Thailand.

During the 12 months preceding June 2017, Triumph sold 63,400 motorcycles.

In 2024, Triumph introduced their first ever off-road motorcycle, the Motocross racer TF 250-X.

== History ==
When Triumph Engineering went into receivership in 1983, John Bloor bought the name and manufacturing rights from the Official Receiver. The former company's manufacturing plant was outdated and unable to compete against the technology from Japanese manufacturers, so Bloor decided against relaunching the brand immediately. Initially, production of the old Triumph Bonneville was continued under licence by Les Harris of Racing Spares, in Newton Abbot, Devon, to bridge the gap between the end of the old company and the start of a new one. For five years from 1983, about 14 a week were built at peak production. They were never exported to the United States due to problems with liability insurance.

Bloor set to work assembling the then-new Triumph business, hiring several of the group's former designers to begin work on new models. The team visited Japan on a tour of its competitors' facilities and decided to adopt Japanese manufacturing techniques and especially new-generation computer-controlled machinery. In 1985, Triumph purchased a first set of equipment to begin working, in secret, on its new prototype models. By 1987, the company had completed its first engine. In 1988, Bloor funded the building of a new factory at a 10-acre (40,000 m^{2}) site in Hinckley, Leicestershire. The first Hinckley Triumphs were produced for the 1991 model year. Between £70 million and £100 million was invested into the company between purchasing the brand and breaking even in 2000.

At the same time as production capacity increased, Bloor established a new network of export distributors. He had previously created two subsidiary companies, Triumph Deutschland GmbH and Triumph France SA. In 1994, Bloor created Triumph Motorcycles America Ltd.

At 21:00 on 15 March 2002, as the company was preparing to celebrate the 100th anniversary of the Triumph brand, half of the main factory including the assembly area and stores was destroyed by a fire which began at the rear of the facility. At the height of the blaze, over 100 firefighters with 30 vehicles were tackling the fire. Nevertheless, the company, which by then employed more than 650, quickly rebuilt the facility and returned to production by September that year.

In May 2002, Triumph began construction on a new sub-assembly manufacturing facility in Chonburi, Thailand to make various components. A second factory was opened in 2006 by Andrew Mountbatten-Windsor, where a wet painting facility and assembly line was established. A third factory was opened in 2007 to include high pressure die-casting and machining, and Triumph announced that they were expanding to increase capacity to over 130,000 motorcycles. Triumph Motorcycles (Thailand) Limited is a 100% UK owned company and now employs about 1000 staff.

In June 2009, Digby Jones, Baron Jones of Birmingham, the former Minister of State for Trade, became chairman, and the 1,600 cc (98 cu in) Thunderbird twin-cylinder cruiser was announced.

In early 2011, Nick Bloor, John Bloor's son, took over from Tue Mantoni as CEO of Triumph Motorcycles, and in 2017 Triumph opened a new £4 million visitor centre, along with a collection of Triumph motorcycles, memorabilia, and a factory tour. In February 2020 it was announced that Triumph would be moving the remainder of large scale motorcycle production, including the Tiger 1200 and Speed Triple production lines, to their Thailand factories, leaving only the specialist Triumph Factory Customs and prototype builds remaining in the UK. Whilst the R&D department remains within the UK (and 20 additional staff have been taken on in that department), substantially larger redundancies were announced amongst production staff.

In 2017, Triumph and Bajaj a Pune based Indian motorcycle and three-wheeler manufacturer announced a partnership; the company also has partnership in KTM and Husqvarna motorcycle. As a result, Bajaj and Triumph would build smaller capacity motorcycle for higher volume developing markets and all the products will be branded under Triumph brand. This agreement also gives Bajaj access to Triumph brand operations in Indian market.

In a press release dated 20 July 2021, Triumph announced a factory off-road competition programme to create new motocross and enduro machines. In the same release they announced the participation of seven-time AMA motocross and five-time supercross champion Ricky Carmichael and five-time enduro champion Iván Cervantes in the development of the new bikes. Since then, a series of videos on the official Triumph YouTube channel called "Vision to Reality" highlighted the bike's chassis and engine, followed by a video of Carmichael and amateur motocross rider Evan Ferry, the son of 1997 AMA 125cc Supercross East champion Tim Ferry, riding the 250cc four-stroke motocross bike at a testing track. The production motocross bike, being ridden by three-time AMA motocross and three-time supercross Champion Jeff Stanton, was also showcased to the public on September 22-23, 2023, at the SuperMotocross World Championship Finals at the Los Angeles Memorial Coliseum.

In July 2023, Triumph and Bajaj launched their first two motorcycles under partnership Speed 400 and Scrambler 400 which were a scaled down versions of their Speed twin 1200 and Scrambler 1200 respectively these smaller capacity models are powered by fuel-injected euro 5 engines producing almost 40hp and almost 38 nm torque supported by a 6 speed transmission with Slipper clutch. After the launch the models managed to collect 10,000 bookings in India within 10 days of the launch after which the price were hiked, and production speed was ramped up by Bajaj.

== Financial performance ==
Turnover at the Triumph leapt by a quarter to £774 million and profits doubled to £93 million, according to results for the year ending June 2022

In 2017, Triumph's revenue increased by 22 per cent to £498.5 million and this increased pre-tax profits to £24.7 million from £16.6 million the previous year.

Over 85 per cent of motorcycles are now sold in overseas markets, but the 9,400 motorcycles sold in the UK in 2017 represents a record for the company.

Bloor invested over £80 million in Triumph Motorcycles before it first broke even in 2000.

During the 2008 recession, Bloor Holdings – which controls Triumph - breached its banking covenants but was able to re-negotiate its loans with lenders.

== Model range ==
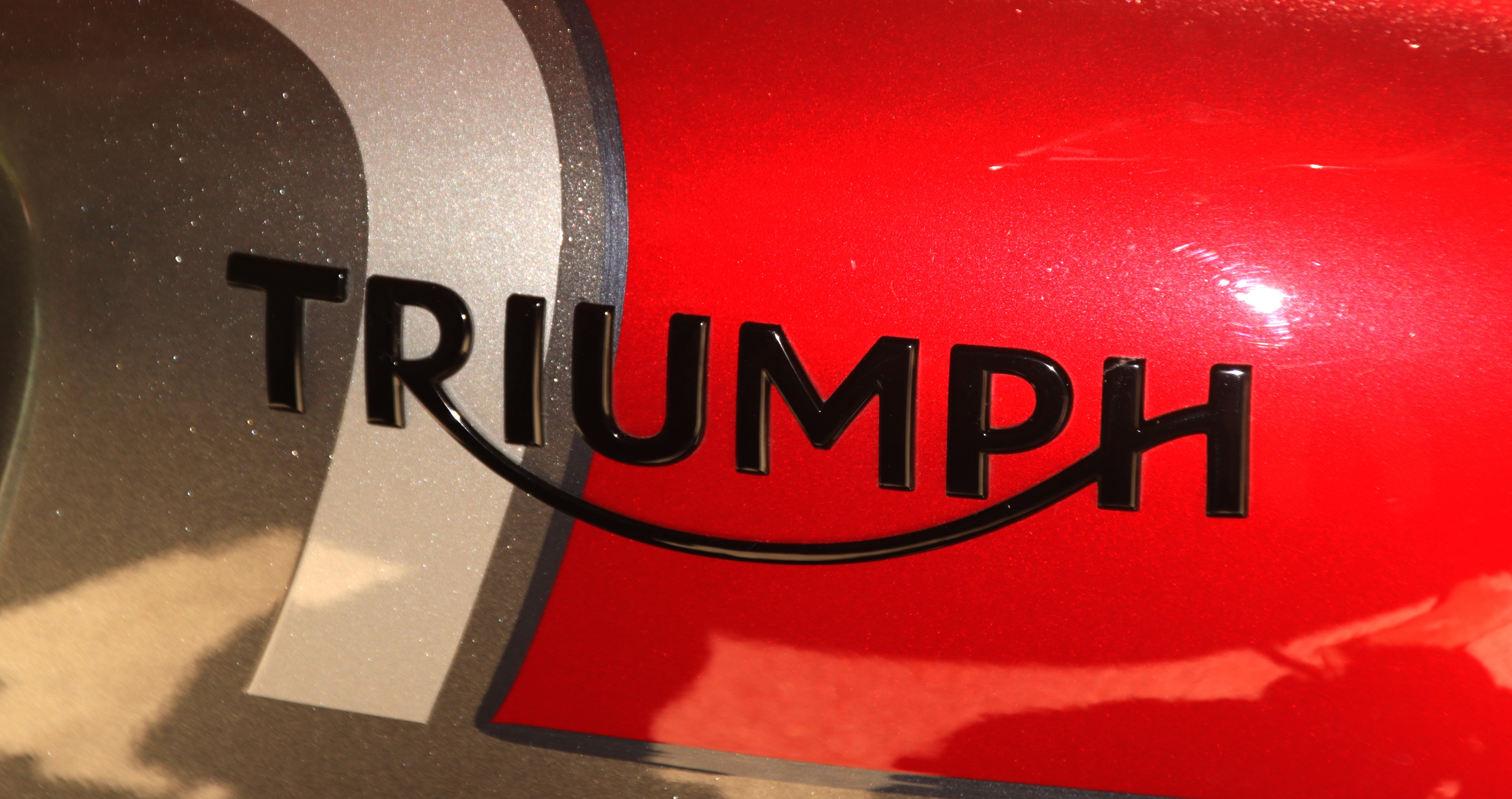
Triumph Logo on Triumph fuel tank

A range of new 750 cc and 900 cc triple-cylinder bikes and 1000 cc and 1200 cc four-cylinder bikes were launched at the September 1990 Cologne Motorcycle Show. The motorcycles used famous model names from the glory days of Meriden Triumph and were first made available to the public between March (Trophy 1200 being the first) and September 1991. All used a modular liquid-cooled DOHC engine design in a common large diameter steel backbone frame. The modular design was to ensure that a variety of models could be offered whilst keeping production costs under control—an idea originally put forward, in air-cooled form, in the early 1970s by Bert Hopwood but not implemented by the then BSA-Triumph company.

The first models, known generically as the T300s, all used a common piston diameter (76 mm) in a common wet cylinder liner. Basic engine variations were achieved through the use of two specifications of piston stroke: 65 mm to create individual cylinder capacity of 300 cc, and 55mm to create a 250 cc individual cylinder. Two 750 cc models were released – and the Daytona and Trident 750 triples (3 x 250 cc). There was one 1000 cc model – the Daytona 1000 four (4 x 250 cc). Two 900 cc models were the Trophy 900 and Trident 900 triples (3 x 300 cc). The Trophy 1200 four was the largest model (4 x 300 cc). All were remarkably smooth running. The three cylinder models were equipped with a contra-rotating balance shaft mounted at the front of the engine. The four cylinder models benefitted from twin balance shafts – unique at the time – mounted beneath the crank shaft. Contemporary road tests noted the solidity and smoothness of performance as positives but the weight of the machines as negatives. For brand new machines produced by a totally new concern, there were remarkably few early problems. These were an insecure oil pressure switch and a longer-lived problem with the starter (or sprag clutch). The cosmetic finish on the first machines was simple and not very robust. Revisions to crankcases for the three-cylinder models in 1993, together with a move to high pressure casting, reduced engine weight considerably. All painting and plating operations were brought in house in 1993, as the Hinckley factory benefitted from further investment after the initial success of the range. The result was improved quality and durability of finish, added to the basic engineering integrity of the engine and chassis, made for a long-lasting and robust motorcycle.

The range was largely revised in 1997 with the release of the T500 range, followed by a light-weight four-cylinder 600 cc sports TT600. The 600 was a major design departure and initially received a poor press: "unpleasant at low revs due to a lethargic and unpredictable throttle response, with anonymous styling". As sales built, the big fours were phased out of the lineup and parallel twins and triples became the marketing and development focus of Triumph's marketing strategy. Triumph also decided to exploit demand for retro motorcycles with modern engineering. The Triumph Thunderbird 900 exploited the styling cues of the 'old' Triumphs legendary designer, Edward Turner whilst retaining the modern triple engine. The 790 and 865 cc versions of the Triumph Bonneville and Thruxton look and sound original but internally they have modern valves and counterbalance shafts.

For their contemporary range, the triple is Hinckley Triumph's trademark, filling a niche between European and American twins and four-cylinder Japanese machinery. The 2,294 cc (140.0 cu in) triple Rocket III cruiser was introduced in 2004. The first 300 Rocket III models were already sold before they were produced, and there was a long waiting list for Rockets into 2005.

On 21 July 2008, Triumph held a Global Dealer Conference where new models for 2009 were launched, including the official announcement of the parallel twin-cylinder Thunderbird.

Triumph's best-selling bike is the 675 cc Street Triple. In 2010 they launched the Triumph Tiger 800 and Tiger 800 XC, dual-sport motorcycles, which uses an 800 cc engine derived from the Street Triple, and is designed to compete directly with the market leading BMW F800GS. In 2012, the Tiger 800 was joined by the shaft-driven Triumph Tiger Explorer.

=== Current production models ===
==== Sports ====
- Daytona 660

==== Naked Sports ====
- Street Triple 765 R
- Street Triple 765 RS
- Speed Triple 1200 RS
- Speed Triple 1200 RX

==== Roadster ====
- Speed T4
- Speed 400
- Speed Twin 900
- Speed Twin 1200
- Trident 800
- Trident 660
- Tracker 400

==== Café Racer ====
- Thruxton 400
- Thruxton RS

==== Muscle Cruiser ====
- Rocket 3 Storm R
- Rocket 3 Storm GT

==== Cruiser ====
- Bonneville T100
- Bonneville T120
- Bonneville Speedmaster
- Bonneville Bobber
- Bonneville T40

==== Scrambler ====
- Scrambler 400 X
- Scrambler 400 XC
- Scrambler 900
- Scrambler 1200 X
- Scrambler 1200 XE

==== Adventure Tourer ====
- Tiger Sport 660
- Tiger Sport 800
- Tiger 850 Sport (Discontinued in 2025)
- Tiger 900 GT Low
- Tiger 900 GT
- Tiger 900 GT Pro
- Tiger 1200 GT
- Tiger 1200 GT Pro
- Tiger 1200 GT Explorer

==== Adventure ====
- Tiger 900 Rally
- Tiger 900 Rally Pro
- Tiger 1200 Rally Pro
- Tiger 1200 Rally Explorer

==== Off-Road ====
- TF 250-X, since 2024
- TF 250-E, since 2025
- TF 250-C, since 2026
- TF 450-RC Edition, since 2025
- TF 450-E, since 2025
- TF 450-C, since 2026

==== E-Bike ====
- Trekker

=== Triumph Factory Custom motorcycles ===
In December 2018, Triumph said they were developing a new range of high spec limited edition motorcycles, called Triumph Factory Custom (TFC). The first model was the Thruxton TFC, with production run limited to 750 units. In May 2019, the second model, the Rocket 3 TFC, was introduced at a motorbike show at Shoreditch, London. In November 2019, Triumph announced a third TFC model, the Bobber TFC, at the EICMA Motorcycle Show in Milan.

== Racing ==
From 2019 season onwards for a three-year term, Triumph were awarded the contract to be the controlled-engine supplier for the FIM Moto2 World Championship. This was extended in 2021 for at least another three years. All Moto2 teams changed from a Honda CBR600 unit to a 765 cc triple-cylinder engine supplied by Triumph that was originally developed from the Street Triple RS engine, but with additional race tuning that creates at least 138PS peak power. Engines are prepared by ExternPro, an independent business based in Spain.

== Gallery ==
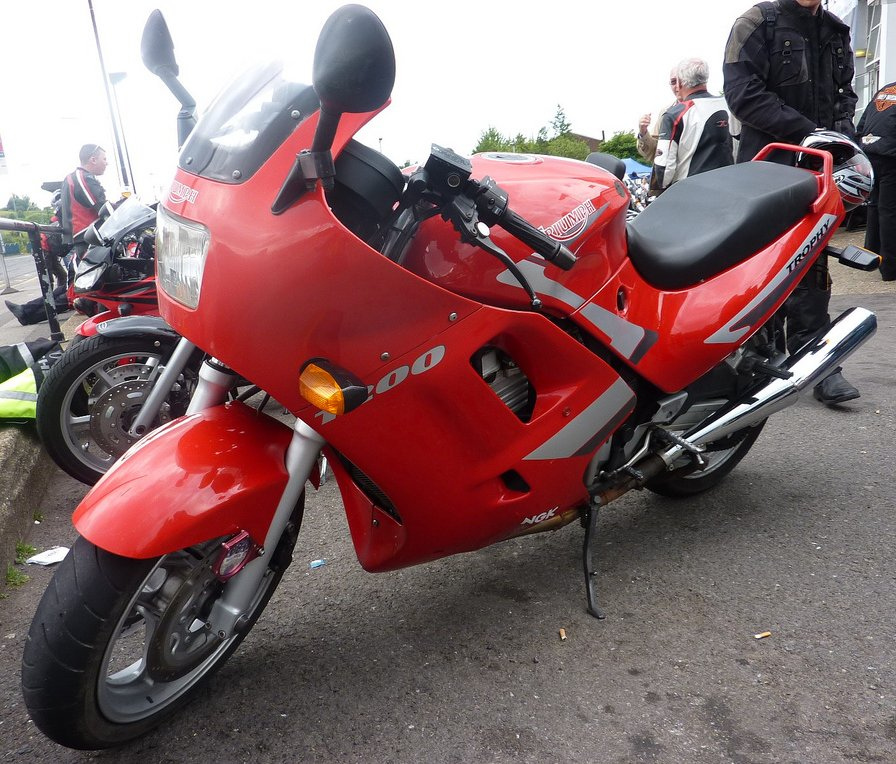
1991 Triumph 1200 cc Trophy

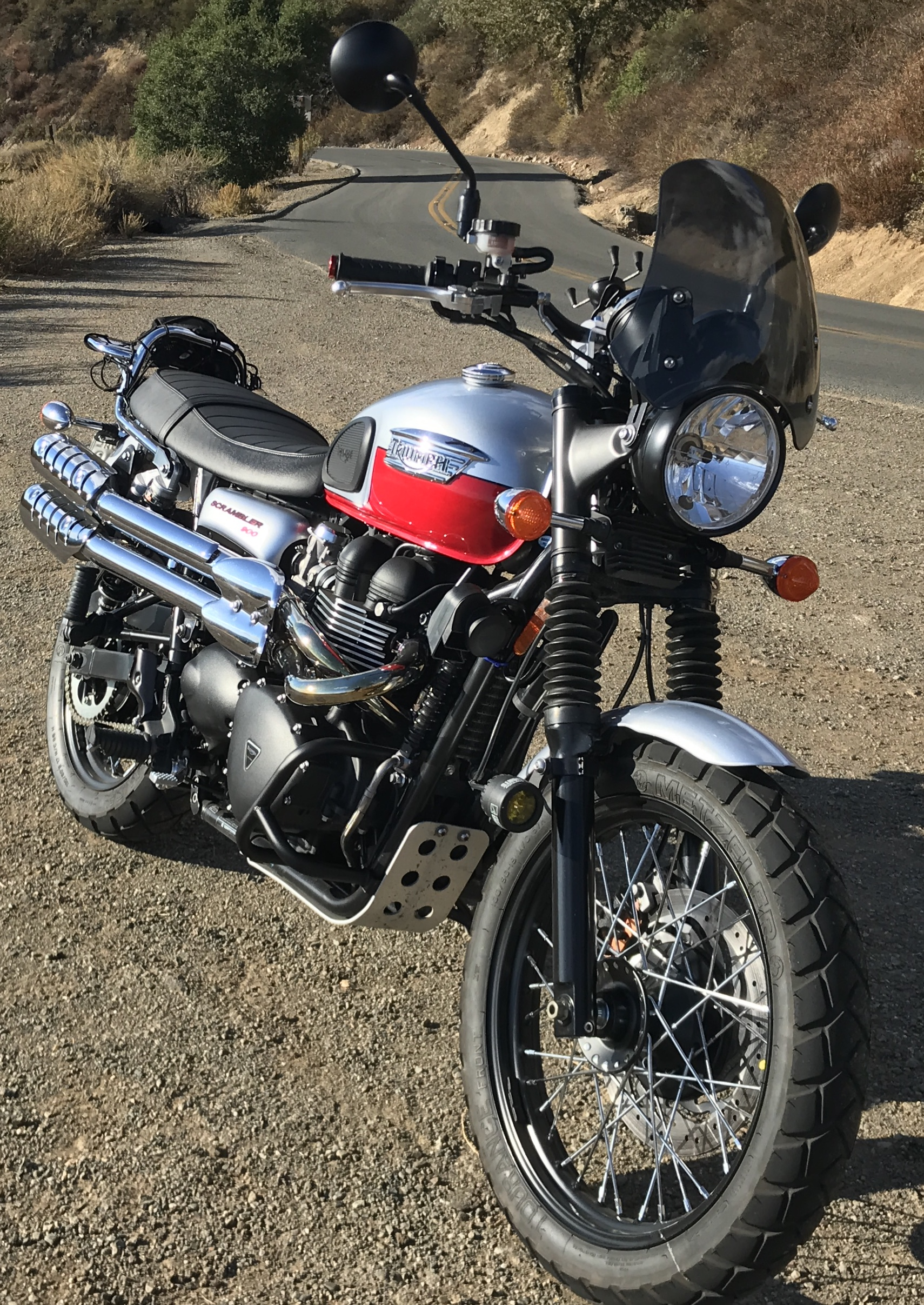
Modified 2014 Triumph Scrambler

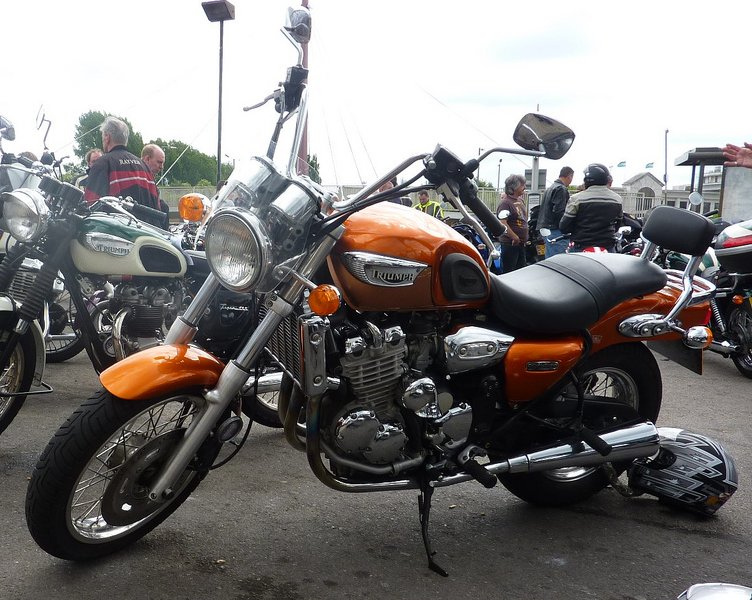
Triumph 900 cc Adventurer, first variation of the popular Triumph Thunderbird 900 triple

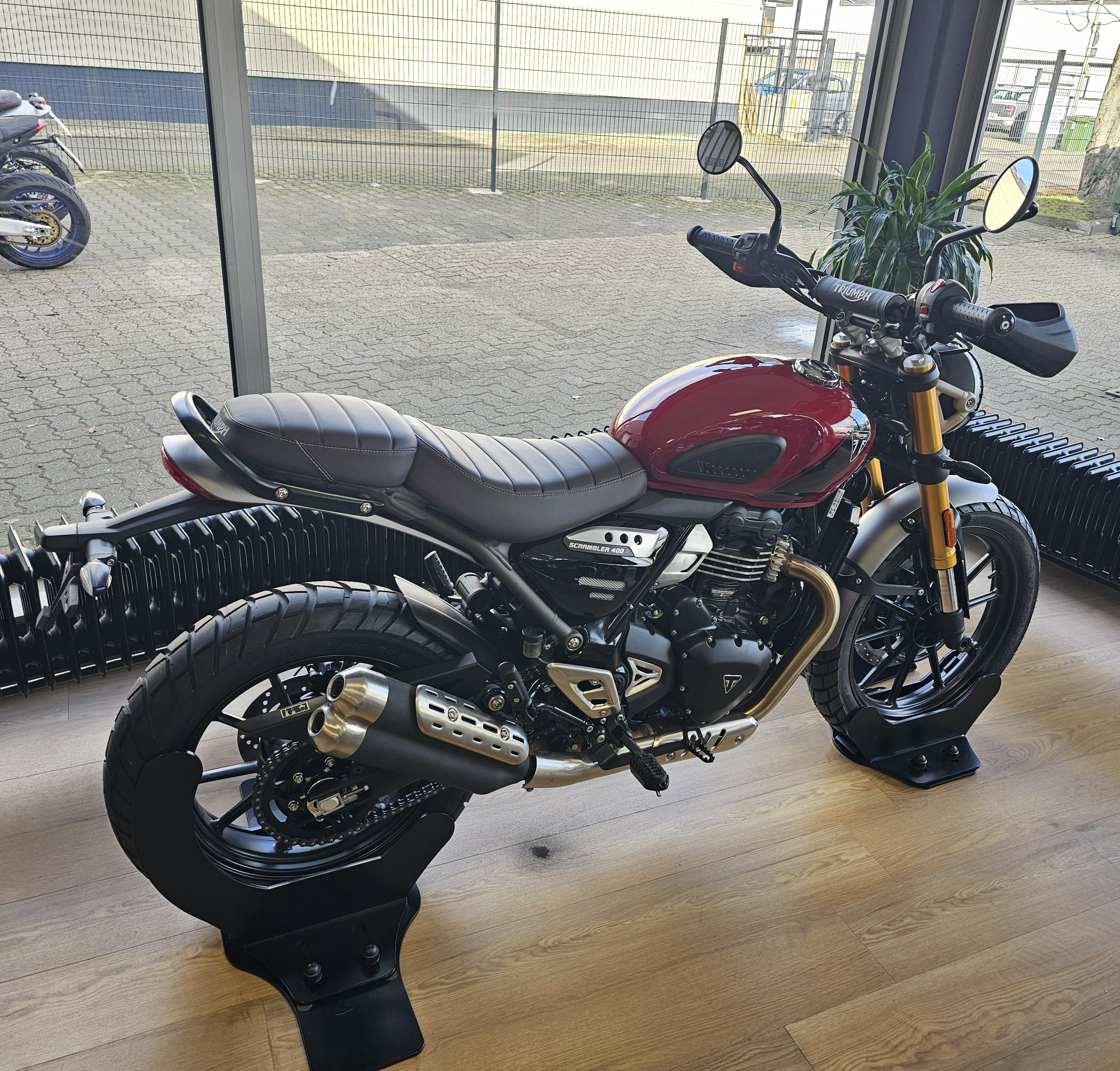
2023 Triumph Scrambler 400 X at Oberhausen, Germany

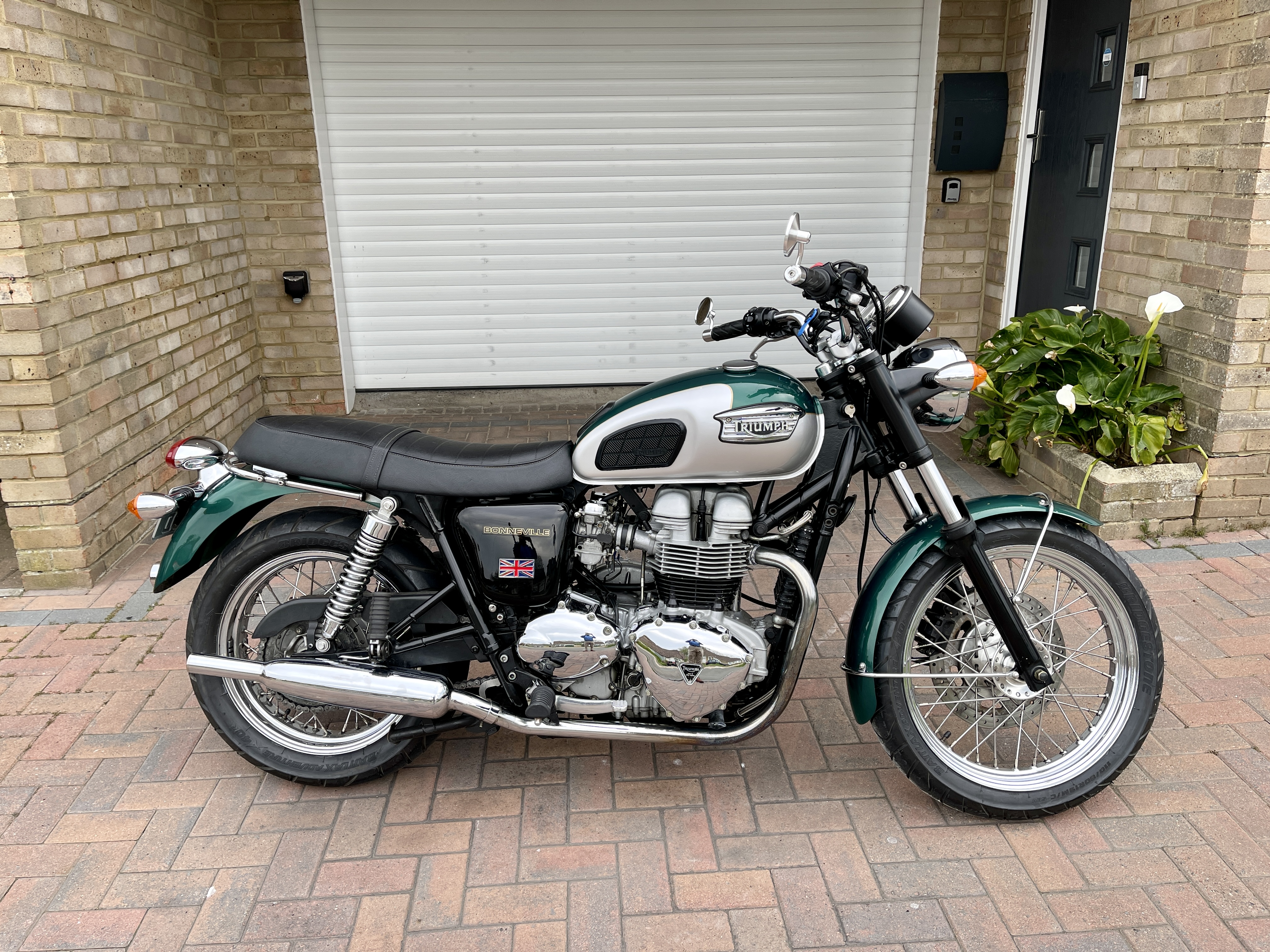
The 4th Bonneville to come off the line at Hinckley (November 2000)

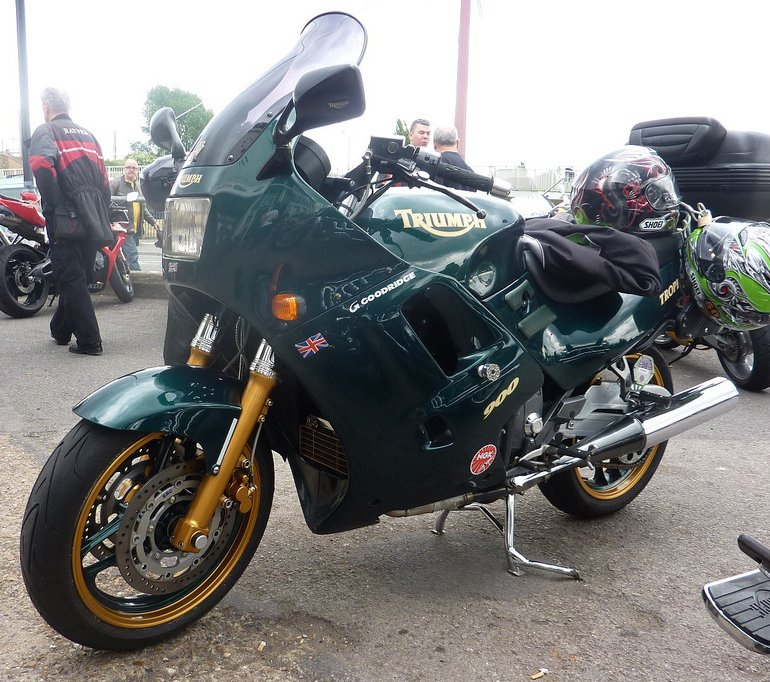
Mid-1990s Triumph Trophy tourer with the 900 cc triple engine. The small Union Flag was then a standard feature on all Triumphs except the Thunderbird

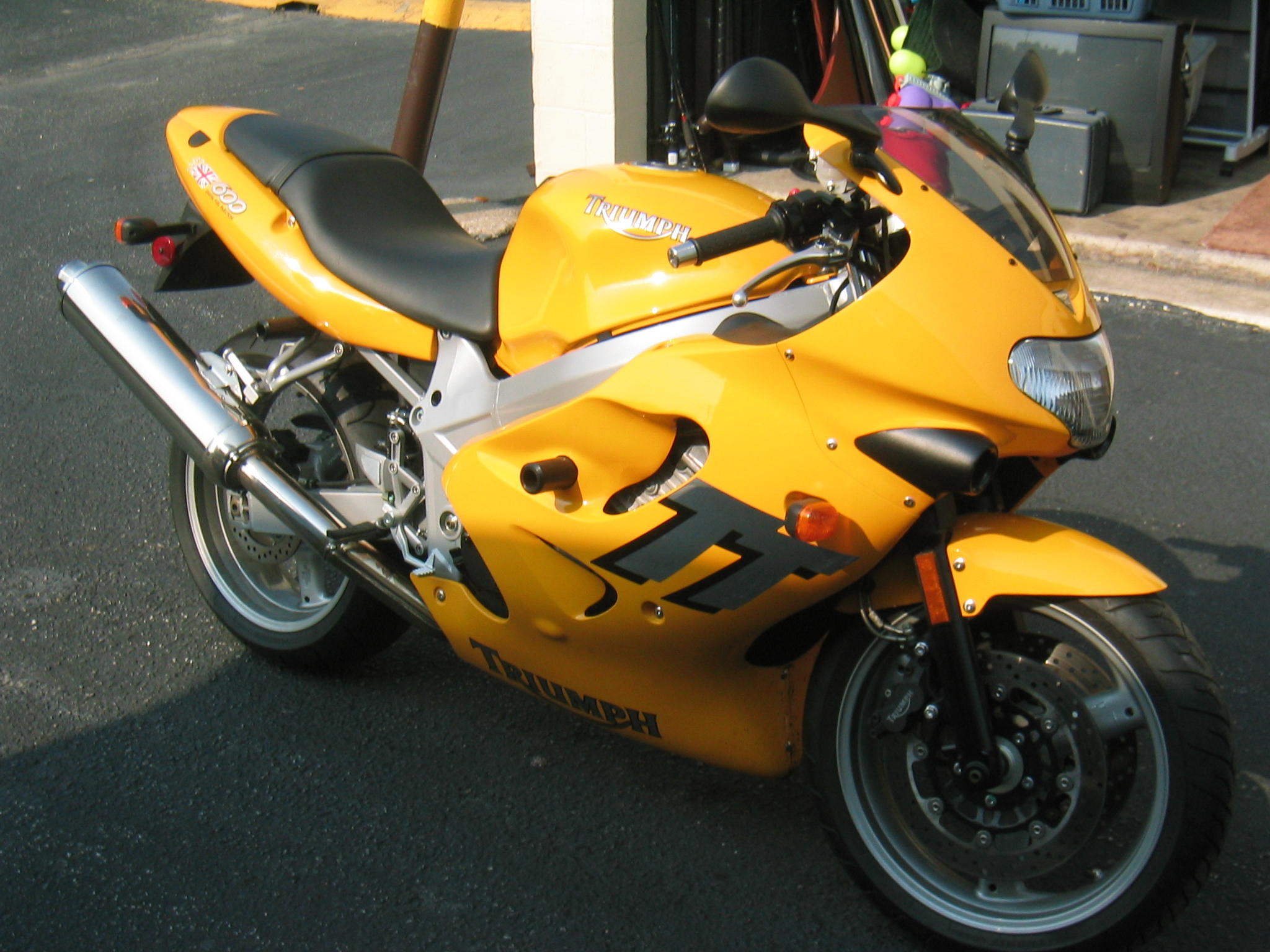
TT600

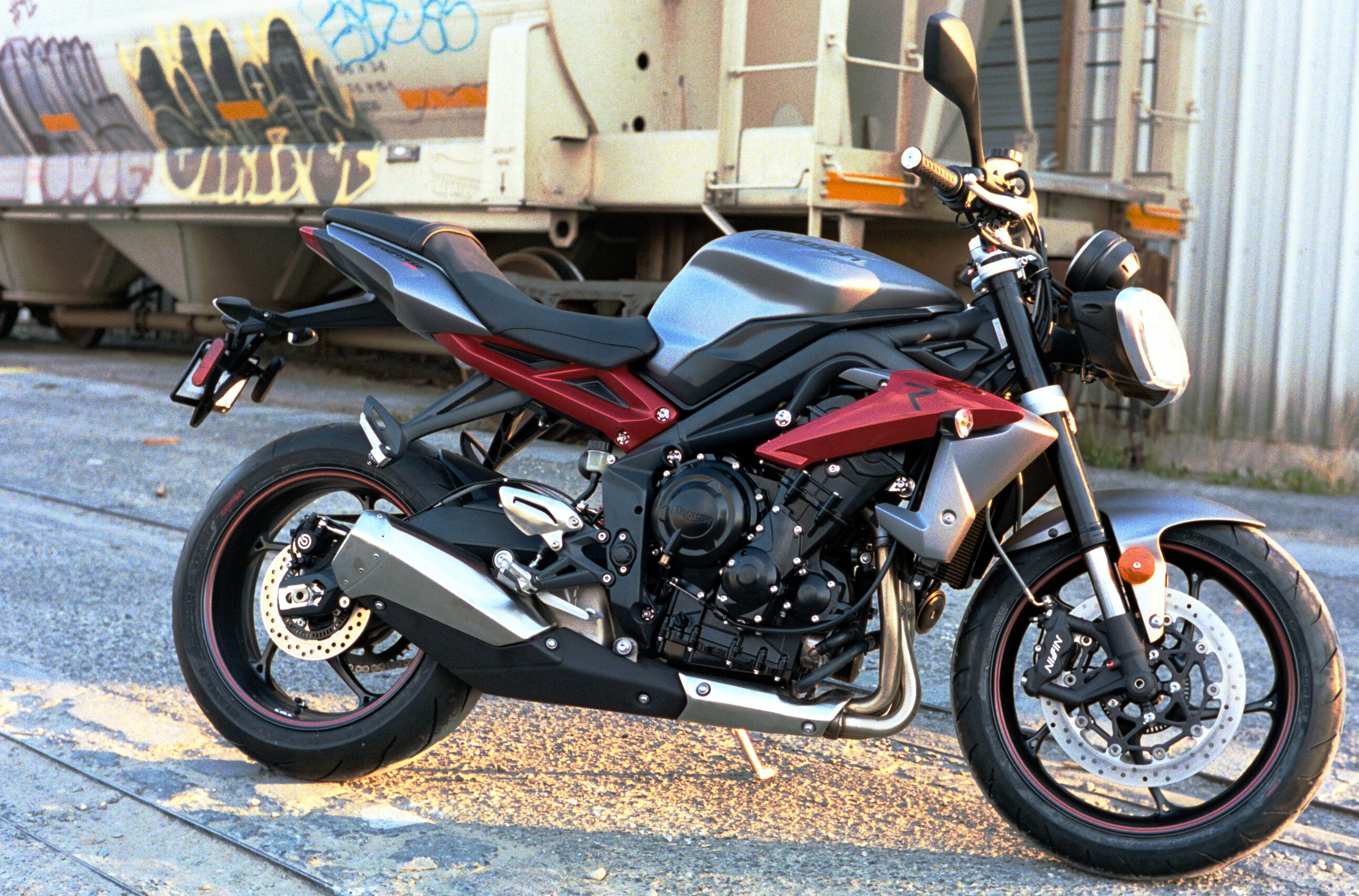
2014 Triumph Street Triple R

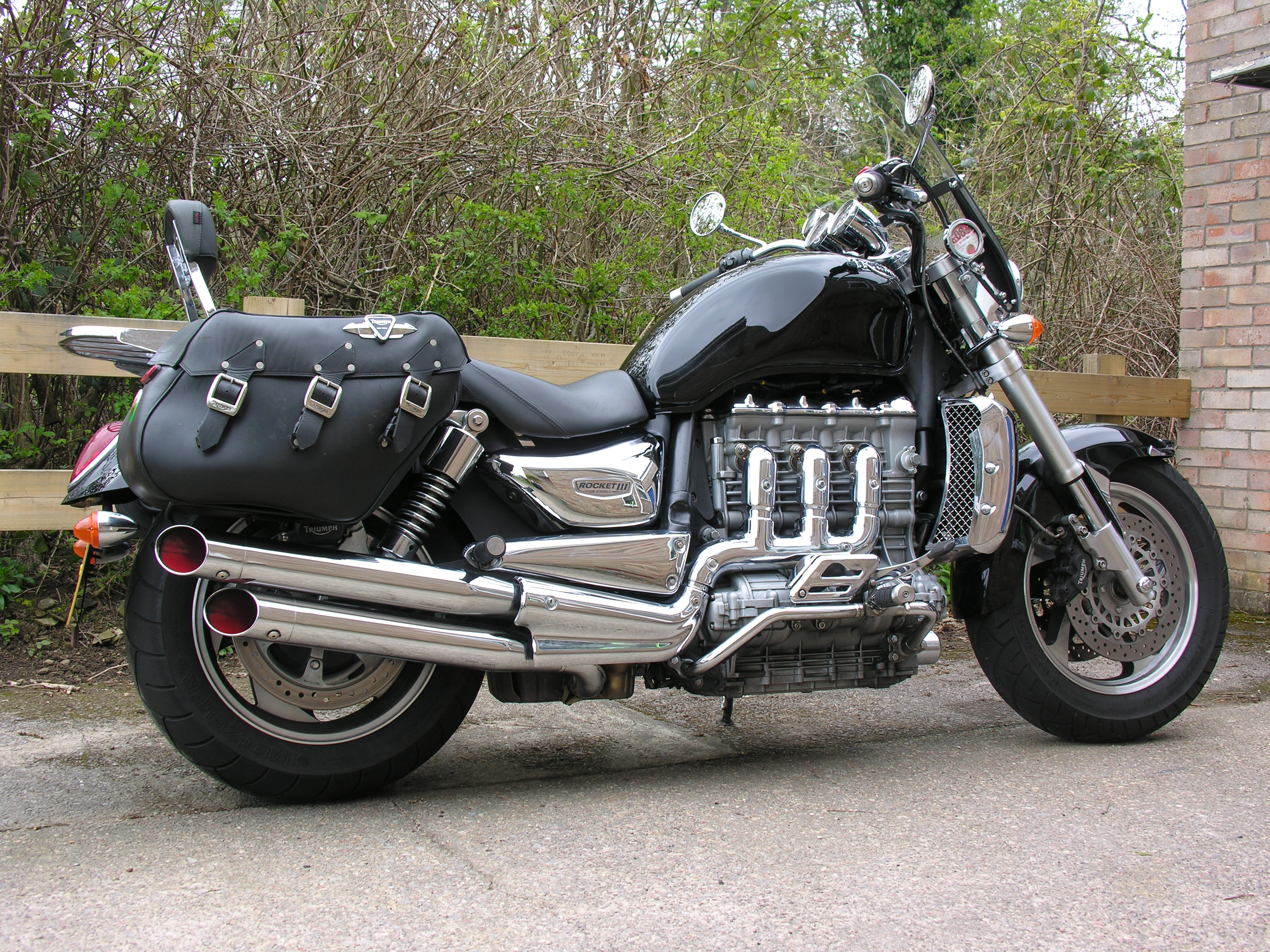
Triumph Rocket III, the largest displacement production motorcycle in the world

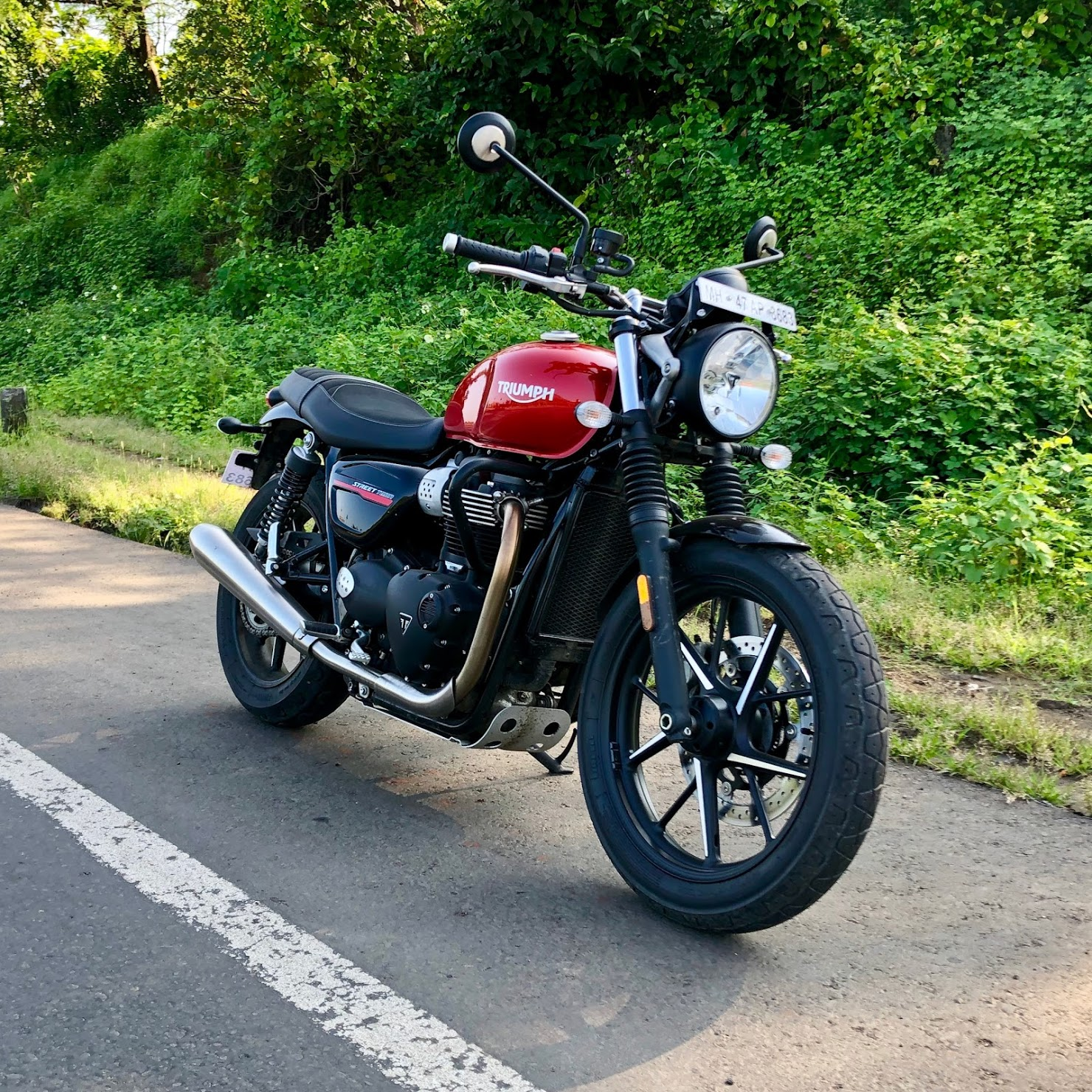
2019 Street Twin, Triumph's entry level motorcycle in the Triumph Bonneville range

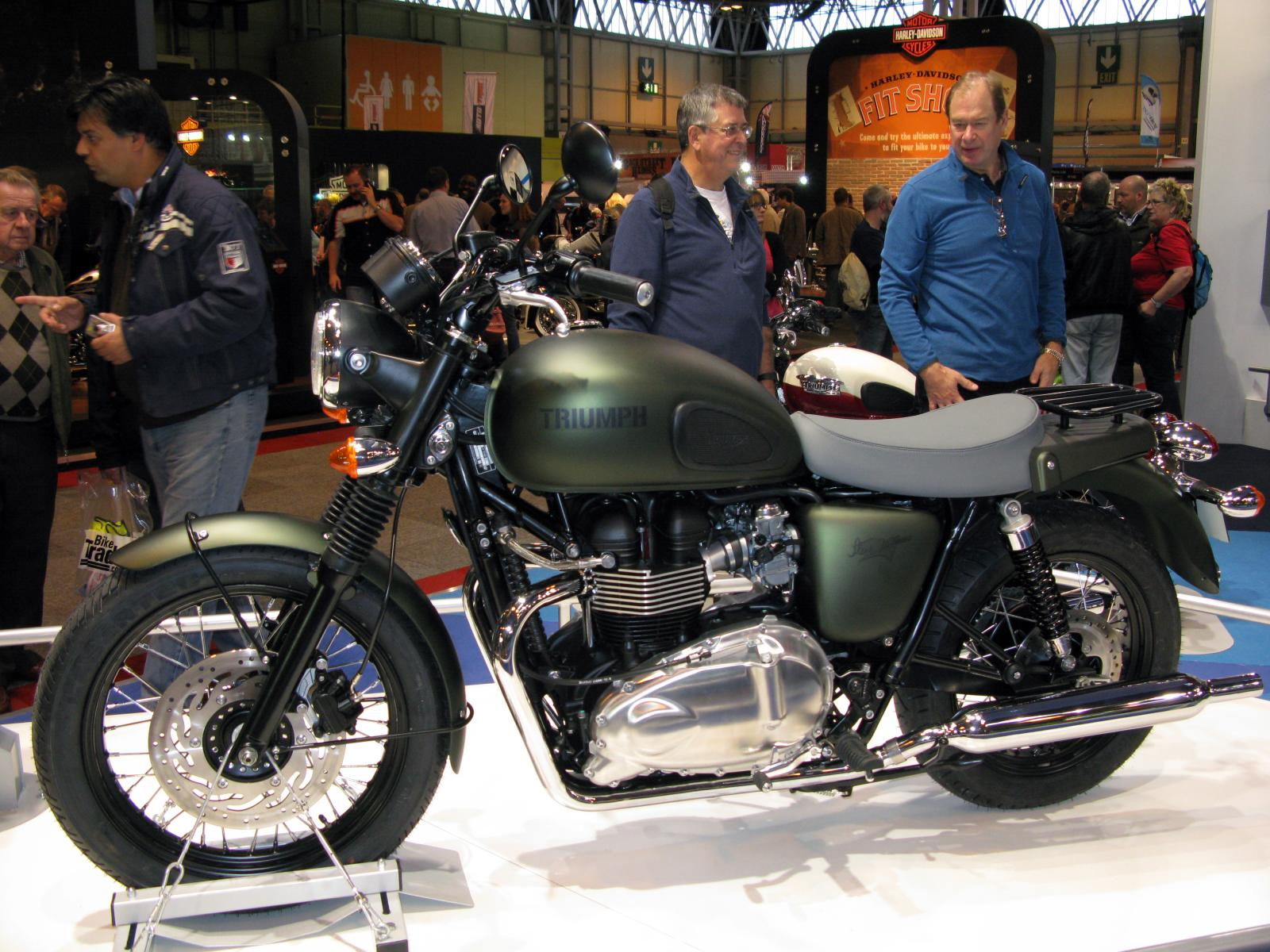
2012 Triumph Bonneville T100 Special Edition "Steve McQueen" motorcycle sought to replicate style of McQueen's 650 cc Triumph TR6 Trophy used in the film The Great Escape

== Marketing, media, product placement, and brand management ==
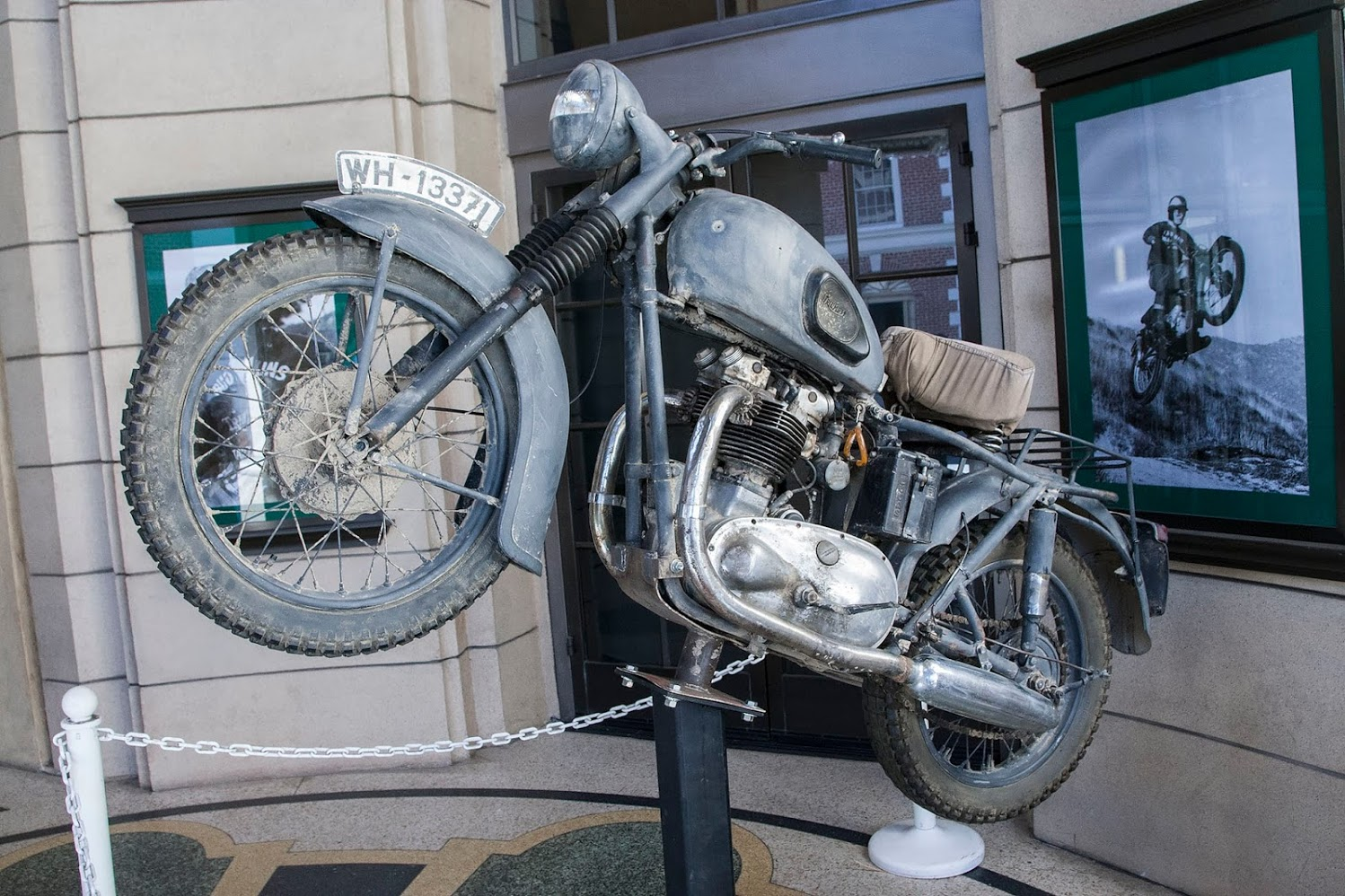
The Triumph TR6 Trophy featured in the 1963 film, The Great Escape, which was painted black to resemble a German BMW

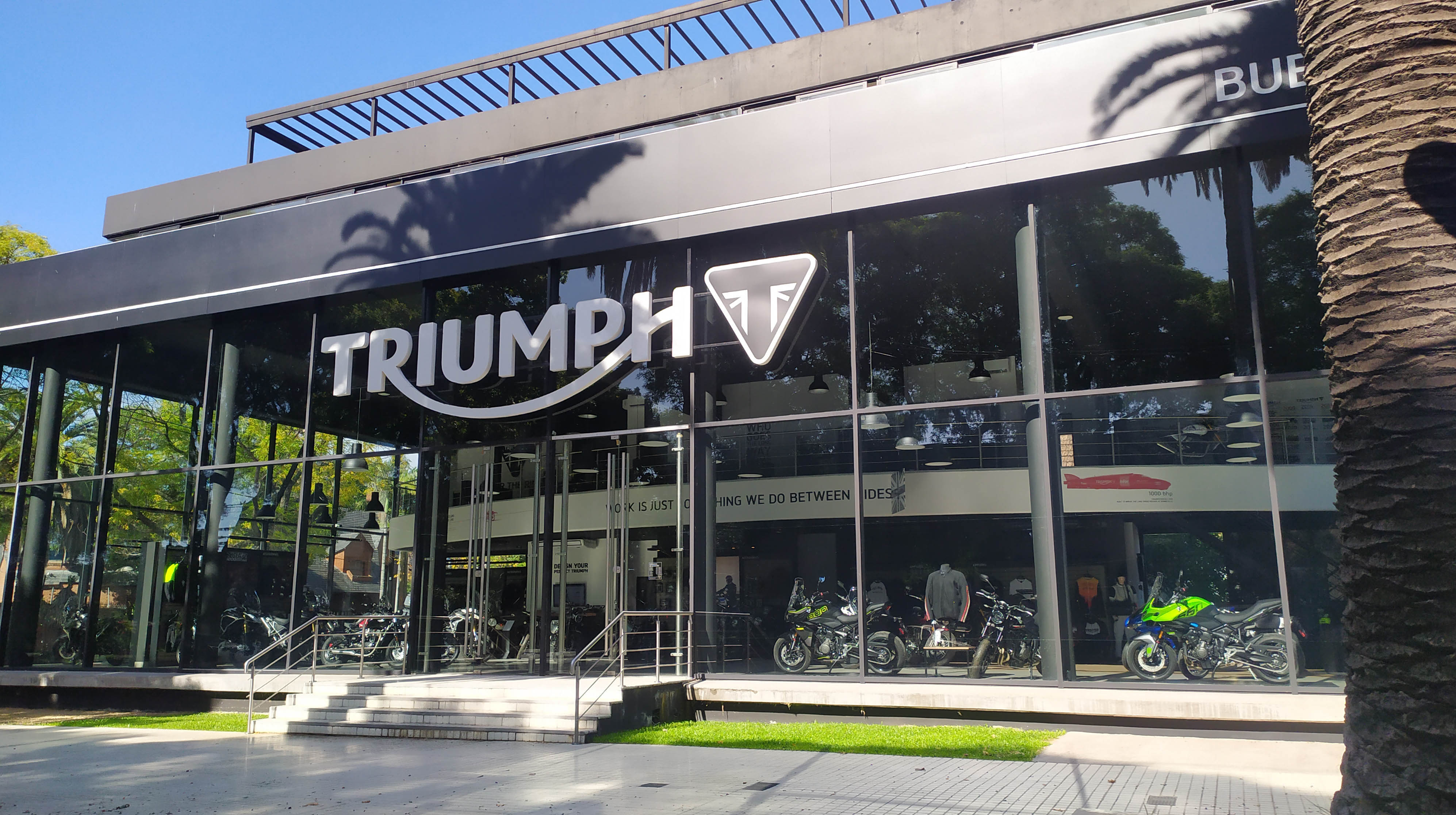
Triumph dealership in Argentina

The Triumph brand, and its resurrection, has been subject to detailed analysis and lauded as an example of 'retro cool', with analysts noting its appeal to heritage and nostalgia.

In the 21st century, Triumph marketed lines of clothing with endorsements or likenesses of celebrities associated with the brand in the past, including Bob Dylan, and the deceased Marlon Brando, Elvis Presley, James Dean, and Steve McQueen. McQueen's name and likeness were particularly put to use, such as naming a special edition Bonneville after him.

Since 1953, motorcycles from the brand have been featured in high-profile films and television, including The Great Escape, Happy Days, An Officer and a Gentleman, The Curious Case of Benjamin Button, and the James Bond franchise. However, in 2015, the company stated that whilst it does employ an agency to promote its motorcycles for use in media, it has never paid for product placement, preferring organic inclusion.

In 1995, Triumph began selling the Triple Connection clothing and accessories range of products, designed by Triumph rather than licensed.

== See also ==
- Triumph Cycle (1884–1930) original Triumph, founded by Siegfried Bettmann
- Triumph (TWN) (1896–1956) German manufacturer also founded by Bettmann
- Triumph Motor Company (1930–1936) precursor to Triumph Engineering (1936–1983)
- Triumph Owners Motor Cycle Club
