= Triumph Daytona =

Triumph Daytona is a model designation used for various motorcycles of British motorcycle manufacturer Triumph Motorcycles.

- Triumph Daytona 500, 1966–1970
- Triumph Daytona 600, 2002–2004
- Triumph Daytona 650, 2005
- Triumph Daytona 675, 2006-2017
- Triumph Daytona 750, 1991–1994
- Triumph Daytona Moto2 765, 2019-2022
- Triumph Daytona 900, 1993–1996
- Triumph Daytona 955i, 1997–2006
- Triumph Daytona 1000, 1992–1993
- Triumph Daytona 1200, 1993–1997
- Triumph Tiger Daytona, 1967–1974
