= D (disambiguation) =

D is the fourth letter of the Latin alphabet.

D or d may also refer to:

== Places ==
- D River, in Oregon, US
- Detroit, US, nicknamed "D"

== People with the name ==
- D, the bass player for Australian band Testeagles
- Detlef Soost, German dancer and choreographer, nicknamed "D!" or "Dee!"
- Darshan (Kannada actor), Indian actor, nicknamed "D"
- Dhanush (cf. D50 (film)), Indian actor, nicknamed "D"

== Arts, entertainment, and media ==
=== Fictional entities ===
- D, a character in a series of novels titled Vampire Hunter D by Hideyuki Kikuchi
- D, a nickname given to Count Dracula in the novel Dracula written by Bram Stoker
- D, one of the characters in Another Code: Two Memories (Trace Memory)
- Count D, a character in the anime/manga series Pet Shop of Horrors
- Substance D, a fictional recreational drug in the novel and film A Scanner Darkly
- D, a character from Cyberpunk: Edgerunners 2.

=== Film and television ===
- D (film), a 2005 Bollywood film
- Initial D, a 1995 Japanese manga and anime
- Marco Polo, a 1964 Doctor Who serial (production code "D")
- Domashny, a Russian television channel with a "D" logo

=== Music ===
==== Music terminology ====
- D (musical note)
  - D major, a scale
  - D major chord; see Chord names and symbols
  - D minor, a scale

==== Bands ====
- D (band), a Japanese rock/metal band
- "d:" or "d:?", often used to refer to the Christian rock band Delirious?
- "The D", one of the names of comedy rock band Tenacious D

==== Albums ====
- D (Deuter album), 1971
- D (Daryl Hall album), 2024
- D (Os Paralamas do Sucesso album), 1987
- D (White Denim album), 2011
- D (single album), by Big Bang, 2015
- D, followed by a number, a composition by Franz Schubert according to the Schubert Thematic Catalogue
- Substance D, a drum and bass compilation album by Dieselboy

==== Other uses in music ====
- Steinway D-274 or D, a concert grand piano model manufactured by Steinway & Sons
- D Records, a former record label in Houston, Texas, US
- "D", a song by Little River Band from their album Playing to Win

=== Periodicals ===
- D la Repubblica, stylized as a lower-case d, a weekly supplement to the Italian newspaper la Repubblica
- D Magazine, a magazine for the city of Dallas, Texas, US

=== Other uses in arts, entertainment, and media ===
- D (video game), a game released in 1995 for the PC, 3DO, PlayStation and Sega Saturn
- Initial D, a 1995 Japanese manga and anime that has spawned several video games
- "D" Is for Deadbeat, the fourth novel in Sue Grafton's "Alphabet mystery" series, published in 1987
- d, the number of sides of dice in role-playing games

== Business and economics ==
- Demand (D), in economics
- Denarius, a Roman coin
- Dominion Resources (New York Stock Exchange ticker symbol D)
- Federal Reserve Bank of Cleveland (in serial numbers of US dollars, beginning with D)
- Penny (British pre-decimal coin) (d)

== Linguistics ==
- ’d, a contraction of the English words had and would
- Dingir (^{D}), the Sumerian sign for deity
- [d] or /d/, Voiced alveolar stop consonant in the International Phonetic Alphabet
- [d̪] or /d̪/, Voiced dental plosive consonant in the International Phonetic Alphabet
- [d̠] or /d̠/, Voiced postalveolar plosive consonant in the International Phonetic Alphabet

== Science, technology, and mathematics ==
=== Measurements ===
- d, deci-, SI prefix factor 0.1
- d, the common US measurement of the penny size (an approximation of length), of a nail (fastener)

=== Astronomy and Earth science ===
- D, a February 16 through 29 discovery in the provisional designation of a comet or asteroid
- D, for "Degenerate", a white dwarf in stellar classification
- D/, for "destroyed/disappeared" in comet nomenclature
- D region, part of the ionosphere

=== Biology, chemistry, and medicine ===
- D, Aspartic acid, in biochemistry
- D, Diarrhea
- D, deuterium, an isotope of hydrogen
  - d, Deuteron, the nucleus of deuterium
- d- , prefix signifying a dextrorotatory compound
- D-, prefix indicating absolute configuration
- ATC code D Dermatologicals, a section of the Anatomical Therapeutic Chemical Classification System
- Haplogroup D (mtDNA), a human mitochondrial DNA (mtDNA) haplogroup
- Haplogroup D-M174, a Y-chromosomal DNA (Y-DNA) haplogroup
- Vitamin D

=== Computing ===
==== Programming languages ====
- D (programming language), a C++-like programming language developed by Walter Bright
- D, a programming language designed to be used with the DTrace dynamic tracing framework
- Hugh Darwen's Tutorial D, part of a proposed family of database query languages called "D"

==== Other uses in computing ====
- .d, a file format used for Agilent MassHunter mass spectrometry software
- .d, a pathname component suffix for a directory; for example with the init program
- -d, a suffix of a daemon, a computer program that runs as a background process
- D - Minimal Protection, a security division in the Trusted Computer System Evaluation Criteria

=== Mathematics ===
- D, 500 in Roman numerals
- D, Thirteen, or D in hexadecimal and other positional numeral systems with a radix of 14 or greater
- D and d, the derivative operators
- Total differential operator; in a related but more general meaning, it is the exterior derivative operator in differential geometry (symbol "d")
- d, often a variable for the diameter of a circle in geometry
- d(n), divisor function, the number of positive divisors of an integer n
- $\mathbb{D}$ in blackboard bold, the unit disk in the complex plane, or the decimal fractions; see Number
- Cohen's d, a statistical measure of effect size
- D, a normal modal logic

=== Physics ===
==== Solid state physics ====
- Debye–Waller factor (D)
- Diode (D), an electronic component
- $D(E)$, the density of states at energy $E$

==== Other uses in physics ====
- D, Debye (D), a unit of electrical dipole moment
- D, Dioptre (D), a unit of measurement of the optical power of a lens or curved mirror (also in Medicine)
- D, Diffusion coefficient (D), in molecular physics
- D, Electric displacement field (D)
- D meson, mesons containing charm quarks in particle physics
- D or d, density
- d, thickness, diameter, relative density, lattice plane spacing, and degeneracy of vibrational mode, in molecular spectroscopy
- D band (disambiguation)

=== Other uses in science and technology ===
- D, Mitsubishi Electric's mobile phones in Japan
- D battery, a standard size dry cell battery in electronics
- d', sensitivity index, a statistic used in signal detection theory

== Time and time zones ==
- Day (d), in metrology
- December (D), in calendars
- Dominical letter D, for a common year starting on Thursday
- Delta, the military time zone code for UTC+04:00

== Transportation ==
=== Rail ===
- D (Los Angeles Railway), a line operated by the Los Angeles Railway, US
- D (New York City Subway service), US
- D Line (Los Angeles Metro), US
- Line D (Buenos Aires Underground) of the Buenos Aires Subte
- JR West Nara Line (official West Japan Railway Company service symbol)
- Media–Sharon Hill Line, a SEPTA Metro service, labeled D

=== Other uses in transportation ===
- Dayton Wire Wheels, a brand of wire-spoke wheels, often abbreviated to D's in hip-hop culture
- Drive, or D, the forward cruising gears in an automatic transmission
- Tesla Model D, a concept all-wheel drive electric sedan
- Bandung and Cimahi, Indonesia (vehicle registration prefix D)
- Germany (aircraft registration prefix and international vehicle registration code D, for Deutschland)

== Other uses ==
- D (grade), a below-average grade in education
- D, a brassiere cup size
- D-Company, a criminal group
- Daughter (d)
- Defense (sports) (D)
- Democrat (D), a member of the US Democratic Party
- Died (d.)
- Dominant person (D/), in dominance and submission

== See also ==
- The D (disambiguation)
- D♯ (disambiguation)
- D. (disambiguation)
- D' (disambiguation)
- D- All Things Digital, an annual technology conference
- Dee (disambiguation)
- Dord, a famous dictionary error arising from the abbreviations for density
- Filetab-D, a port of the Filetab language based on decision tables
