= Triumph Speed Four =

British motorcycle

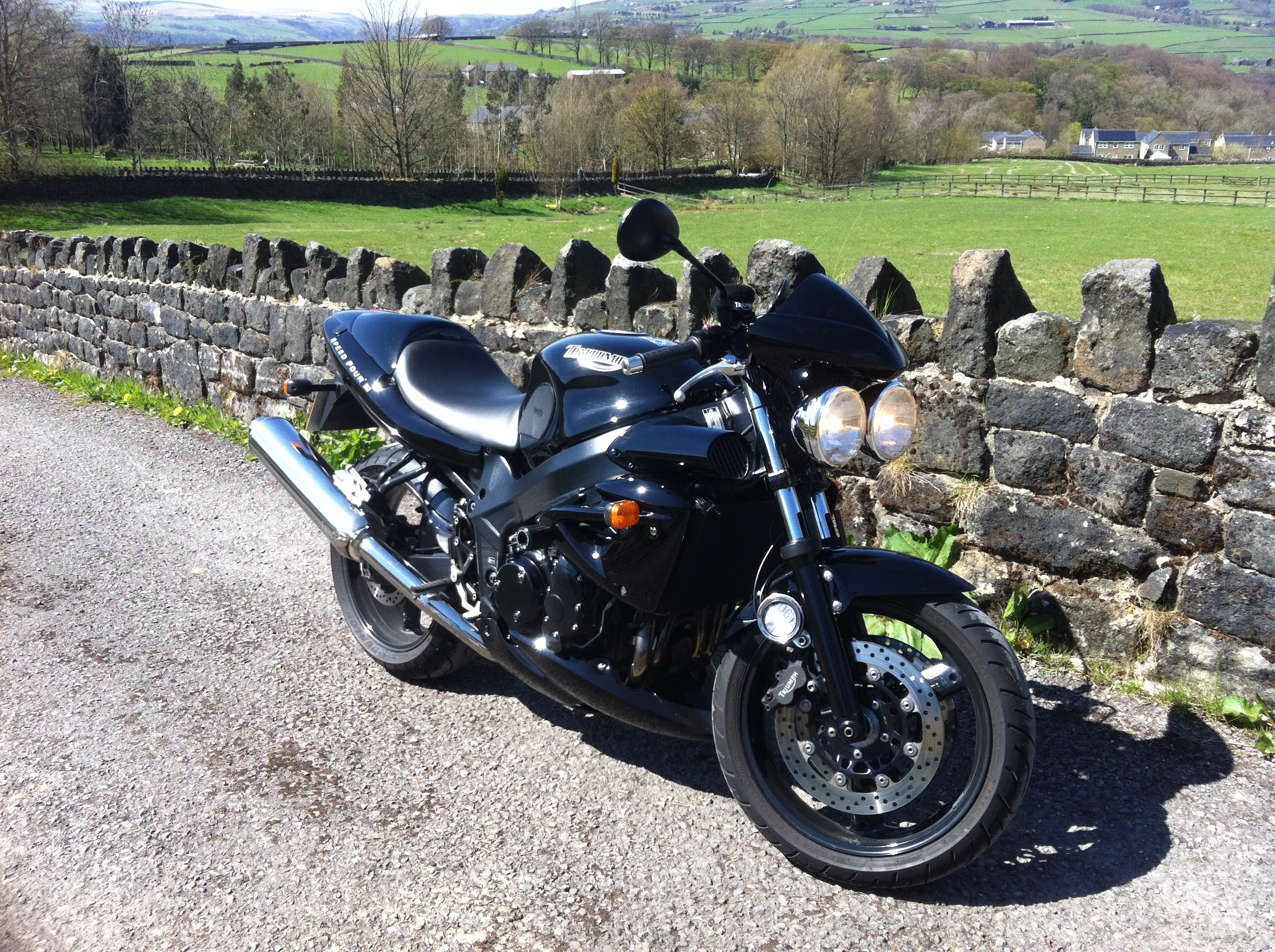
- Manufacturer: Triumph
- Production: 2002–2006
- Predecessor: Triumph TT600
- Successor: Street Triple
- Class: Naked bike
- Engine: 599 cc (36.6 cu in), liquid-cooled DOHC inline-4
- Bore / stroke: 68.0 mm × 41.3 mm (2.68 in × 1.63 in)
- Compression ratio: 12.5:1
- Top speed: 135 mph (217 km/h)
- Power: 73 kW (98 hp) @ 11,750 rpm
- Torque: 56 N⋅m (41 lb⋅ft) @ 8000 rpm
- Transmission: 6 speed, chain drive
- Suspension: Front: 43 mm cartridge forks with dual rate springs and adjustable preload, compression and rebound damping Rear: Monoshock with adjustable preload, rebound and compression damping
- Brakes: Front: Twin 310 mm floating discs, 4 piston calipers Rear: Single 220mm disc, single piston caliper
- Tyres: Front: 120/70 ZR 17; Rear: 180/55 ZR 17
- Rake, trail: 24°, 89.1 mm (3.51 in)
- Wheelbase: 1,394 mm (54.9 in)
- Dimensions: L: 2,060 mm (81 in); W: 665 mm (26.2 in); H: 1,150 mm (45 in)
- Seat height: 810 mm (32 in)
- Weight: 204 kg (449 lb) (wet)
- Fuel capacity: 18 L (4.0 imp gal; 4.8 US gal)
- Fuel consumption: 5.7 L/100 km; 49 mpg_{‑imp} (41 mpg_{‑US})

The Triumph Speed Four is a standard or streetfighter motorcycle made by Triumph from 2002 to 2006 as the naked, or non-faired brother of the TT600 sport bike introduced in 1999.

== Design ==
The Speed Four has similar twin round headlights to the Speed Triple, but a different frame and engine. The Speed Four has the clip-on handlebars of the TT600, rather than the motocross-inspired handlebars of the Speed Triple and other streetfighters.

The Speed Four is mechanically similar to its predecessor, the TT600, with the exceptions of the cam profiles, ignition and fuel injection mapping, front spring rate, and other minor concessions to its streetfighter style; the frame and fully adjustable suspension are race-ready.

The engine is a 599 cc inline-four-cylinder engine, as used in the TT600. The bike has a top speed of 135 mph (217 km/h) and a 0–60 mph (0–97 km/h) time of 4.5 seconds. Motorcyclist tested the 2002 Speed Four's 0 to 1/4 mile (0.00 to 0.40 km) time at 11.65 seconds @ 114.9 mph (184.9 km/h) and 0 to 60 miles per hour (0 to 97 km/h) time at 3.71 seconds.

== Reception ==
The Speed Four was voted No.1 for handling and suspension in Ride magazine's 2008 Rider Power Survey. The Triumph Daytona 675 was second in the same category.

== Productions Totals ==
Triumph UK After Sales has confirmed that 4,606 Speed Fours were produced from 2002 through 2006. Of those 1,011 were produced for the US market with a further 54 for Canada.

== See also ==
This motorcycle has been compared to the following:

- Ducati Monster M620S
- Suzuki SV650
- Honda Hornet 600
- Kawasaki Z750
- Yamaha FZ6
- Yamaha XT660X
