= Deaton =

Deaton is an English locational surname, referencing "any of three villages called Deighton... in the county of Yorkshire".

Notable people with this name include:

- Angus Deaton (born 1945), British-American economist and academic
- Bethany Deaton (died 2012), American who was murdered involving the International House of Prayer
- Brady J. Deaton (born 1942), American educator
- Charles Deaton (1921–1996), American architect
- Dedie Deaton (1903-1986), American chief establishment officer of the Women Airforce Service Pilots
- Dawson Deaton (born 1999), American football player
- Jim Deaton, college coach of American football
- Joel Deaton (born 1957), American professional wrestler
- John Deaton (born 1967), American attorney and political candidate
- Les Deaton (1923–1989), American professional basketball player and college coach
- Sierra Deaton (born 1991), American singer in the duo Alex & Sierra

== See also ==
- Dayton (name)
- Deighton (disambiguation)
