= Daytona =

Daytona may refer to:

== Locations ==
- Daytona Beach, Florida
- Daytona Beach Shores, Florida
- South Daytona, Florida
- The Daytona Beach metropolitan area
- Halifax area, also known as Daytona, the region around Daytona Beach

== Motor racing ==
- Daytona Beach and Road Course
- Daytona International Speedway, a NASCAR speedway, which hosts:
  - Daytona 500, a NASCAR race
  - Daytona 300, a NASCAR race
  - Daytona 200, a motorcycle race
  - 24 Hours of Daytona, a sports car race
  - Daytona Prototypes, a race car type used in the Daytona 24
- Daytona Motorsport, a UK-based karting organisation

== Automobiles ==
- Shelby Daytona
- Ferrari Daytona
- Ferrari Daytona SP3
- Dodge Daytona
- Dodge Charger Daytona
- Dodge Ram Daytona
- Alfa Romeo Daytona
- Studebaker Daytona

== Motorcycles ==
- Triumph Daytona 650
- Triumph Daytona 675
- Triumph Daytona 955i

== Wristwatches ==
- TAG Heuer Daytona
- Rolex Daytona

== Other ==
- Daytona database, a database management system produced by AT&T
- Campagnolo Daytona, a group of mid-range racing bicycle parts now called Centaur
- Daytona, a song by Chris Rea from his 1989 album, The Road to Hell, about the Ferrari model mentioned above
- Daytona (album), an album by American rapper Pusha T
- Daytona USA, a 1994 racing game by Sega
- Microsoft Daytona, development codename of Microsoft's Windows NT 3.5 operating system
