= Dayton (disambiguation) =

Dayton is a city in and the county seat of Montgomery County, Ohio, United States.

Dayton may also refer to:

== Places ==
=== Australia ===
- Dayton, Western Australia

=== Canada ===
- Dayton, Nova Scotia

=== United States ===
- Dayton, Alabama
- Dayton, California, in Butte County
- Dayton, Idaho
- Dayton, Henry County, Illinois
- Dayton, LaSalle County, Illinois
- Dayton, Indiana
- Dayton, Iowa
- Dayton, Kentucky
- Dayton, Maine
- Dayton, Maryland
- Dayton, Berrien County, Michigan
- Dayton, Tuscola County, Michigan or Daytona Station
- Dayton, Minnesota
- Dayton, Missouri
- Dayton, Montana
- Dayton, Nevada
- Dayton, Newark, New Jersey, a neighborhood
- Dayton, New Jersey
- Dayton, New York
- Dayton, Ohio
- Dayton, Oregon
- Dayton, Pennsylvania
- Dayton, Tennessee, site of the 1925 Scopes Trial
- Dayton, Texas
- Dayton, Virginia
- Dayton, Washington
- Dayton, Green County, Wisconsin, an unincorporated community
- Dayton, Richland County, Wisconsin, a town
- Dayton, Waupaca County, Wisconsin, a town
- Dayton, Wyoming
- Fort Dayton, built in the Mohawk Valley in 1776 by Elias Dayton

== Other uses ==
- Dayton (name), a given name and surname
- Dayton (band), a funk band formed in Dayton, Ohio
- Dayton (RTD), a transit station in Aurora, Colorado
- USS Dayton (CL-78) or USS Monterey (CVL-26), an aircraft carrier
- USS Dayton (CL-105), a light cruiser
- University of Dayton, a university in Dayton, Ohio
- Dayton's, a defunct Minneapolis-based department store chain
- Dayton Wire Wheels, an after-market wheels manufacturer
- Dayton Flyers, an athletics team
- Dayton (cyclecar), an English cyclecar from 1922

== See also ==
- 2019 Dayton shooting
- Dayton Agreement, or Dayton Peace Accord (ending the Bosnian War in 1995)
- Dayton Mall, a mall in Miami Township, Montgomery County, Ohio
- Dayton Township (disambiguation), multiple places
- Daytona (disambiguation)
- Deighton (disambiguation)
