= Dayton, Missouri =

Unincorporated community in Missouri, U.S.

Coordinates: 38°29′07″N 94°11′38″W

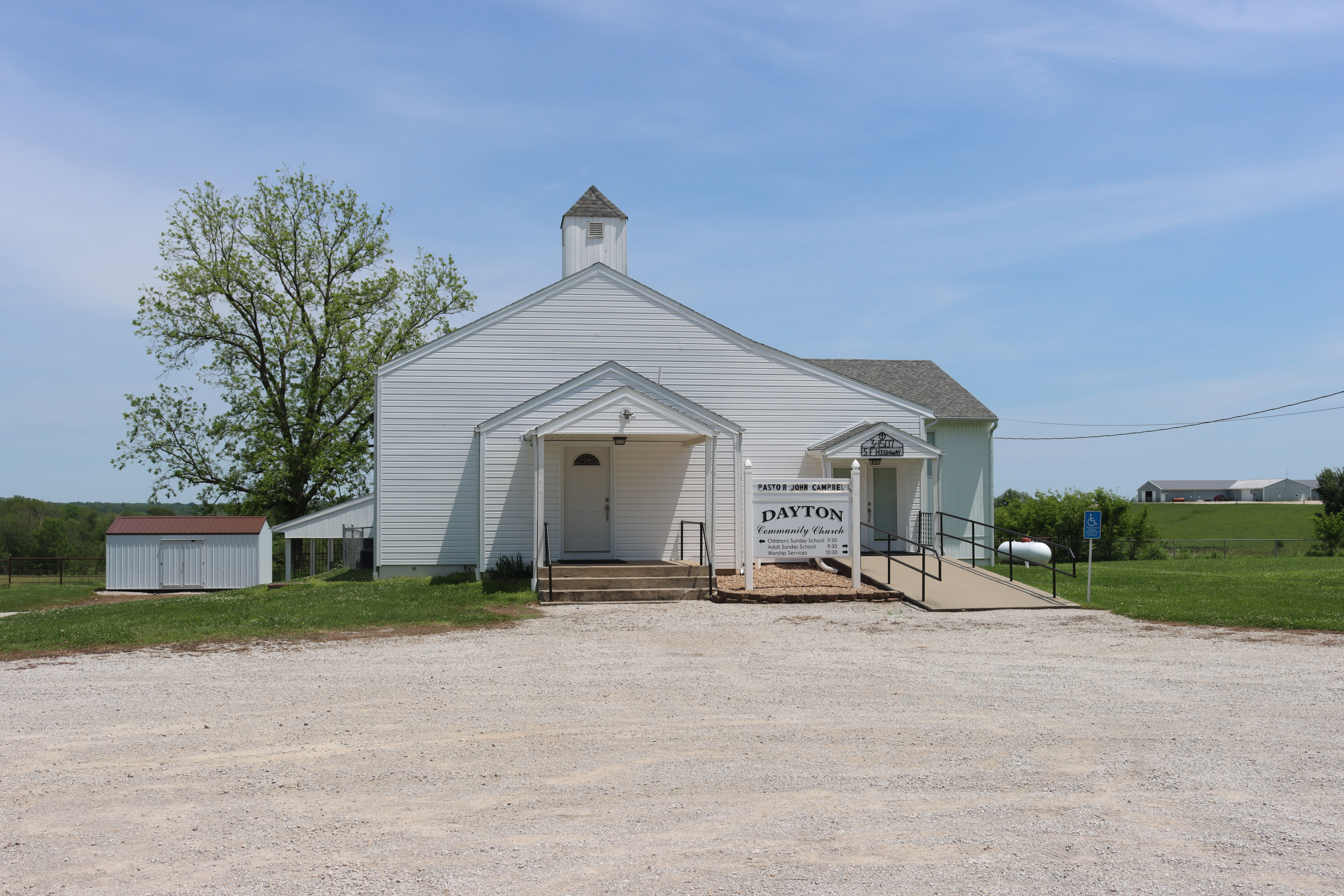
Dayton Community Church

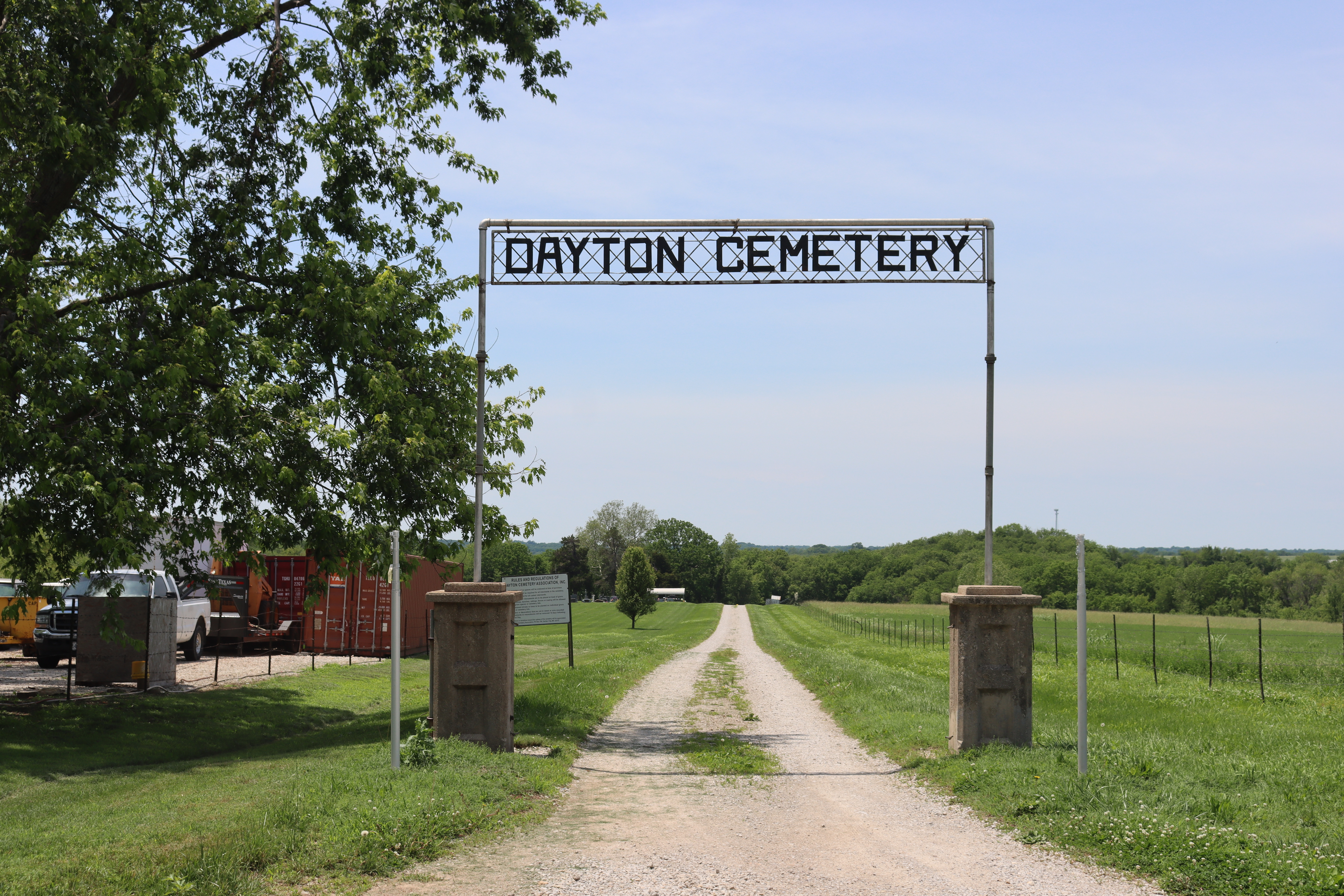
Dayton Cemetery

Dayton is an unincorporated community in southeast Cass County, Missouri, United States. Garden City is five miles north along Missouri Route F and Creighton lies 6.5 miles east along Missouri Route B. The Settles Ford Conservation Area along the South Grand River lies to the southeast. The community lies atop a ridge between Sugar Creek to the west and Lick Branch to the east. It is part of the Kansas City metropolitan area.

== History ==
A post office called Dayton was established in 1856, and remained in operation until 1918. The community was named after William L. Dayton, a vice-presidential candidate in the 1856 United States presidential election. Dayton is currently protected by GCFPD Station 2 located in the center of town.

The town was burned to the ground by Union soldiers during the Civil War, on January 1, 1862.
