= Masterbike =

Masterbike is a contest held on an annual basis to determine the best sport bikes of the year. Motociclismo, a Spanish sport bike magazine, invites cooperating magazines from all over the world (In Moto and Motosprint for Italy, Motociclismo Spain, Motociclismo Brazil, Motorrad, PS, Kickstart, MCN, Australian MCN, Cycle World, Motosprint, In Moto, Moto, Motociclismo Mexico, Motociclismo Portugal, Bike, Bike India, and Motorcyclist) and motorcycle manufacturers as well to join this pure racetrack comparison test. Categories are broken into Supersport, Superbike, and Maxisport. Winners are determined by a rating that is the attribution of the score for the best lap time overall (40%), the fastest lap set for each rider (40%) and the individual rating by each rider (20%). Only the winners of Supersport, Superbike, and Maxisport class reach the final comparison where an overall Masterbike winner is chosen for the year.

== Results ==
=== 2005 ===
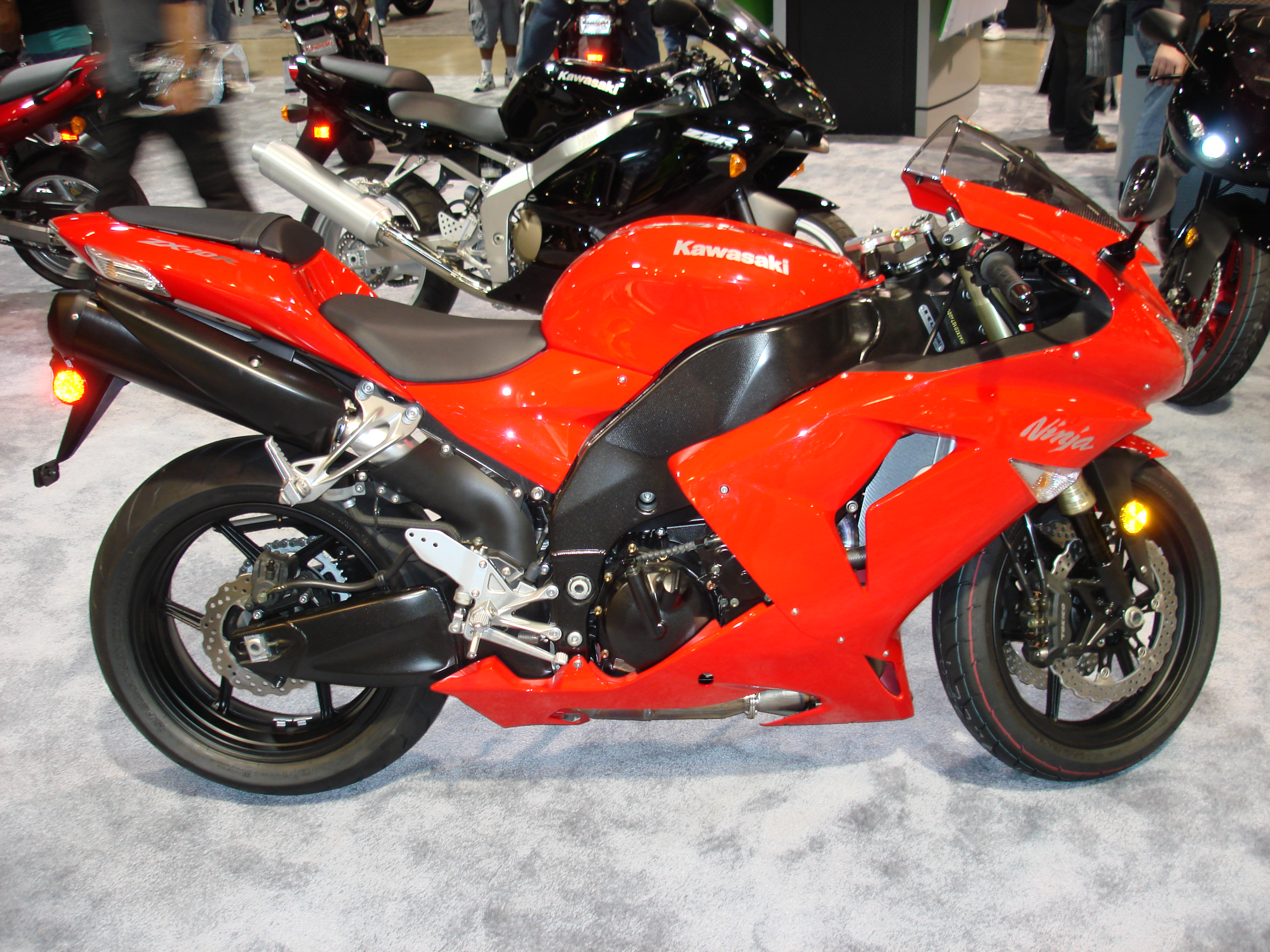
Masterbike 2005 winner: Kawasaki Ninja ZX-10R

Masterbike 2005 was the 8th annual Masterbike. It took place on the Ricardo Tormo circuit at Valencia on 15 June 2005 directly after the Superbike World Championship race weekend.

2005	Motorcycle	Finishing Order	Overall Points	Best Lap Time
Supersport
Supersport	Kawasaki Ninja ZX-6R	1	73	1:44.572
Supersport	Yamaha YZF-R6	2	65	1:44.088
Supersport	Honda CBR600RR	3	45	1:44.949
Supersport	Suzuki GSX-R600	4	23	1:45.758
Supersport	Triumph Daytona 650	5	16	1:46.100
Maxisport
Maxisport	Ducati 999 S	1	81	1:43.559
Maxisport	Aprilia RSV1000R Factory	2	33	1:43.810
Maxisport	Suzuki GSX-R750	3	30	1:43.945
Superbike
Superbike	Kawasaki Ninja ZX-10R	1	67	1:42.672
Superbike	Yamaha YZF-R1	2	57	1:42.833
Superbike	MV Agusta F4 1000 S	3	44	1:43.469
Superbike	Suzuki GSX-R1000	4	37	1:43.383
Superbike	Honda CBR1000RR	5	19	1:43.783
Finale
Finale	Kawasaki Ninja ZX-10R	1	97	1:42.315
Finale	Ducati 999 S	2	55	1:42.436
Finale	Kawasaki Ninja ZX-6R	3	19	1:44.077

=== 2006 ===
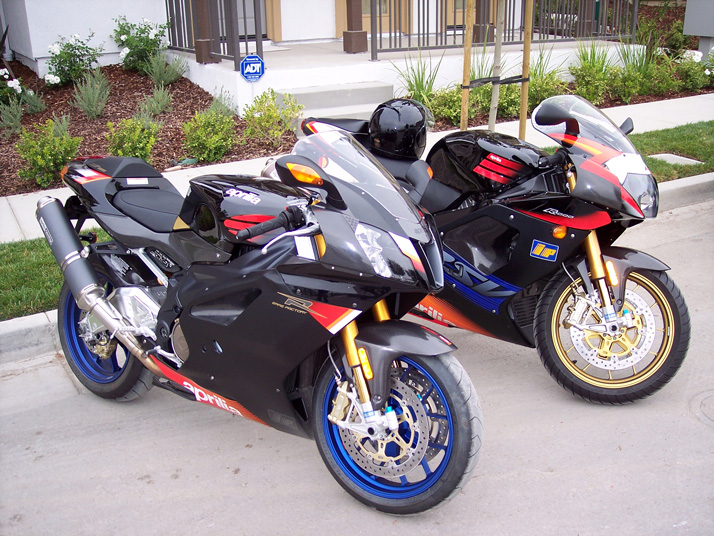
Masterbike 2006 winner: Aprilia RSV1000R Factory

Masterbike 2006 was the 9th annual Masterbike. It took place on the Jerez circuit in Spain on 31 May 2006.

2006	Motorcycle	Finishing Order	Overall Points	Best Lap Time
Supersport
Supersport	Triumph Daytona 675	1	81	1:53.848
Supersport	Yamaha YZF-R6	2	47	1:54.260
Supersport	Suzuki GSX-R600	3	35	1:54.408
Supersport	Kawasaki Ninja ZX-6R	4	21	1:54.387
Supersport	Honda CBR600RR	5	15	1:54.786
Maxisport
Maxisport	Aprilia RSV1000R Factory	1	72	1:52.871
Maxisport	Suzuki GSX-R750	2	53	1:54.053
Maxisport	Ducati 999 S	3	21	1:53.624
Superbike
Superbike	Kawasaki Ninja ZX-10R	1	69	1:52.573
Superbike	MV Agusta F4 1000 R	2	57	1:51.172
Superbike	Suzuki GSX-R1000	3	43	1:52.723
Superbike	Yamaha YZF-R1	4	43	1:53.217
Superbike	Honda CBR1000RR	5	16	1:53.523
Finale
Finale	Aprilia RSV1000R Factory	1	76	1:52.514
Finale	Kawasaki Ninja ZX-10R	2	63	1:52.940
Finale	Triumph Daytona 675	3	17	1:52.993

=== 2007 ===
Masterbike 2007 was the 10th annual Masterbike. It took place on the Jerez circuit in Spain in May, 2007.

2007	Motorcycle	Finishing Order	Overall Points	Best Average Lap Time
Supersport
Supersport	Triumph Daytona 675	1	79	1:55.942
Supersport	Honda CBR600RR	2	39	1:56.366
Supersport	Yamaha YZF-R6	3	30	1:56.462
Supersport	Kawasaki Ninja ZX-6R	4	22	1:56.633
Supersport	Suzuki GSX-R600	5	12	1:56.782

=== 2008 ===
Masterbike 2008 was the 11th annual Masterbike. It took place at Albacete Circuit in Spain.

2008	Motorcycle	Finishing Order	Overall Points	Best Average Lap Time
Supersport
Supersport	Yamaha YZF-R6	1	N/A	1:37.211
Supertwins
Supertwins	Aprilia RSV1000R Factory	1	N/A	1:37.181
Superbike
Superbike	Honda CBR1000RR	1	N/A	1:36.580
Finale
Finale	Honda CBR1000RR	1	N/A	1:36.580
Finale	Yamaha YZF-R6	2	N/A	1:37.211
Finale	Aprilia RSV1000R Factory	3	N/A	1:37.181
