= Dayton metropolitan area (disambiguation) =

The Dayton metropolitan area is the metropolitan area centered on Dayton, Ohio.

Dayton metropolitan area may also refer to:

- The Dayton micropolitan area surrounding Dayton, Tennessee

== See also ==
- Dayton (disambiguation)
