= The D =

The D may refer to:

- A nickname for Detroit
- Tenacious D, an American rock band composed of Jack Black and Kyle Gass
- The D Las Vegas, a hotel and casino in Nevada

== See also ==
- D (disambiguation)
