= D. =

D. or d. may refer to, usually as an abbreviation:

- Don (honorific), a form of address in Spain, Portugal, Italy, and their former overseas empires, usually given to nobles or other individuals of high social rank.
- Date of death, as an abbreviation.
- District of Columbia Department of Transportation, whose logo is "d."
- Schubert Thematic Catalogue, also known as the Deutsch catalogue (or D.), a numbered list of all compositions by Franz Schubert compiled by Otto Erich Deutsch.
- a penny, from the Latin denarius.

== See also ==
- D (disambiguation), other meanings of "D"
- D, the letter
