= Dayton (name) =

Dayton is both a surname and a given name. Notable people with the name include:

== Surname ==
- Alston G. Dayton (1857–1920), West Virginia congressman
- Charles W. Dayton (1846–1910), American politician and judge from New York
- Danny Dayton (1923–1999), American actor
- Douglas Dayton (1924–2013), American businessman and philanthropist
- Elias Dayton (1737–1807), Colonel and father of Jonathan and builder of Fort Dayton
- George Dayton (1857–1938), American entrepreneur and founder of Dayton's department store
- Howard Dayton (born 1943), American chief executives
- James Dayton (born 1988), English footballer
- Jesse Dayton, American musician
- Jesse C. Dayton (1825–1903), New York politician
- John C. Dayton (1837–1899), Mayor of Flint, Michigan
- Jonathan Dayton (1760–1824), son of Elias, signer of the United States Constitution, and Speaker of the House
- Keith Dayton (born 1949), US Army Lieutenant General
- Margaret Dayton (born 1949), American politician
- Mark Dayton (born 1947), former Governor of Minnesota and former US Senator
- Matt Dayton (born 1977), American Nordic combined skier
- Paul A. Dayton, American biomedical engineer
- Paul K. Dayton, American oceanographer
- Sky Dayton (born 1971), American entrepreneur
- Warren Dayton (born 1940), American illustrator
- William L. Dayton (1807–1864), American politician

== Given name ==
- Dayton Allen (1919–2004), comedian and voice actor
- Dayton Campbell, Jamaican politician
- Dayton Countryman (1918–2011), American politician
- Dayton Miller (1866–1941), American physicist and astronomer
- Dayton Moore (born 1967), American baseball executive
- Dayton Wade (born 2000), American football player
- Dayton Ward (born 1967), science fiction author

== See also ==
- Dayton (disambiguation)
- Danton (name)
