= Dighton =

Dighton may refer to a location in the United States:

- Dighton, Kansas
- Dighton, Massachusetts
- Dighton, Michigan

== Surname ==
- Alex Dighton, South Australian politician
- John Dighton (1909–1989), British playwright and screenwriter
- Robert Dighton (1752–1812) English portrait painter, printmaker and caricaturist
- Robert Dighton (MP), English politician

== See also ==
- Deighton (disambiguation)
