= Triumph Daytona Moto2 765 =

British motorcycle

- Manufacturer: Triumph
- Production: 2019–2021
- Predecessor: Triumph Daytona 675
- Successor: Triumph Daytona 660
- Class: Sport bike
- Engine: 765 cc (46.7 cu in), inline-3, 12 valve, DOHC
- Bore / stroke: 78 mm × 53.38 mm (3.071 in × 2.102 in)
- Compression ratio: 12.9:1
- Power: 95.4 kW (127.9 hp) @ 12,250 rpm
- Torque: 80 N⋅m (59 lbf⋅ft) @ 9,750 rpm
- Transmission: 6-speed foot change
- Frame type: Front - Aluminum beam twin spar, Rear - Two-piece high pressure die cast
- Related: Triumph Street Triple Moto2™ Edition

The Triumph Daytona Moto2 765 is a sport bike with three-cylinders, produced by Triumph Motorcycles.

== Specifications ==
The Daytona Moto2 is a mid-size sports bike, equipped with a double-spar aluminum frame. The engine is consistent with those supplied by Triumph to use in the Moto2 class of the world championship from 2019. To reflect this collaboration with the FIM, Triumph created a production derivative bike that takes the name of the previous Daytonas.

The power unit, which was developed using that of the Triumph Street Triple RS as a basis, is a 765 cc inline three-cylinder four-stroke engine with a liquid cooling system that produces a maximum power of 130 PS at 12,250 rpm and delivers a torque of 80 Nm at 9,750 rpm. Airflow is managed by two overhead camshafts (DOHC) with 12 valves (4 per cylinder) with fuel administered by a multi-point indirect electronic injection system.

There are two 310 mm Brembo floating front disc brakes with radially mounted four-piston calipers. At the rear there is a 220 mm single disc with a single piston-caliper. The front tyres measure 120/70 ZR 17 while the rear is 180/55 ZR 17.
