= D band =

D band may refer to:

- D (band), a Japanese visual kei rock band
- D band (NATO), a radio frequency band from 1 to 2 GHz
- D band (waveguide), a millimetre wave band from 110 to 170 GHz
