= Lick Branch (South Grand River tributary) =

River in Missouri, United States of America

Coordinates: 38°27′12″N 94°09′07″W

Lick Branch is a stream in Cass County in the U.S. state of Missouri. It is a tributary of the South Grand River.

Lick Branch was so named for the mineral licks along its course which attracted wildlife.

== See also ==
- List of rivers of Missouri
