= "D" Is for Deadbeat =

Novel by Sue Grafton

- First edition cover
- Author: Sue Grafton
- Language: English
- Series: Alphabet Mysteries
- Genre: Mystery fiction
- Published: 1987 (Henry Holt and Company)
- Publication place: United States
- Pages: 229 first edition
- ISBN: 978-0-8050-0248-5
- OCLC: 14413876
- Dewey Decimal: 813/.54 19
- LC Class: PS3557.R13 D2 1987
- Preceded by: "C" Is for Corpse
- Followed by: "E" Is for Evidence

"D" Is for Deadbeat is the fourth novel in Sue Grafton's "Alphabet" series of mystery novels and features Kinsey Millhone, a private eye based in Santa Teresa, a fictionalized version of Santa Barbara, California. The novel follows the development of Kinsey's relationship with Jonah Robb, the police officer she met in B is for Burglar. Released in the United States on May 14, 1987, it was published by Henry Holt and Company.

== Plot summary ==
Kinsey Millhone receives a contract from ex-con Alvin Limardo to deliver a cashier's check for $25,000 to a 15-year-old boy named Tony Gahan. According to Limardo, Tony helped him through a difficult time in his life, leaving Limardo indebted. When Limardo's retainer check bounces, Kinsey attempts to track him down and get her money back. She learns that Alvin Limardo's real name is John Daggett, and that he is a bigamist. His first wife, Essie, refused to divorce him due to her fanatical religious views, but Daggett still remarried on his release from prison.

Kinsey discovers that Daggett was found dead on the beach only a few days after hiring her. Through Daggett's daughter Barbara, Kinsey learns that Tony Gahan was the sole survivor of a car accident caused by Daggett, for which he was convicted of vehicular manslaughter. Also killed in the accident was a friend of Tony's younger sister and a boy called Doug Polokowski. Gahan now lives with his aunt and uncle, Ramona and Ferrin Westfall. Kinsey interviews Gahan and discovers him to be a troubled teenager with a hidden sensitive side.

Kinsey tracks down an ex-con friend of Daggett's, Billy Polo, who is revealed as Doug Polokowski's brother. Billy, who lives in a trailer park with his sister Coral, introduced Daggett to Daggett's second wife, Lovella. Kinsey suspects that Billy Polo is not giving her the full truth about his involvement with Daggett.

Kinsey discovers that shortly before his death, Daggett was staggering about drunk at the marina in the company of a blonde woman in a green outfit. Kinsey sets out to discover which of the numerous blonde women in the case might be the killer. While visiting the marina, Kinsey's gun is stolen from her car.

Coral confesses to Kinsey that her brother Billy is blackmailing someone whom he suspects of Daggett's killing. Coral also admits to scheming with Billy and Lovella to rob Daggett of money he had come by illicitly in prison. Kinsey realizes this is the money Daggett had given her to pass on to Tony.

Billy Polo is murdered at the beach, shot with Kinsey's gun. The police investigating Billy's murder discover that the gun was wrapped in a towel to silence the shot. Kinsey immediately recognizes the towel as coming from the Westfall household, and begins to suspect Ramona. This means confronting Tony, who has given Ramona an alibi. In pursuing Tony, Kinsey realizes Tony himself, dressed as a woman in his aunt's wig, was actually the killer. He also stole her gun and killed Billy Polo, who had recognized Tony at Daggett's funeral. Killing the man who killed his family has done nothing to ease Tony's torment and he commits suicide by throwing himself off a building in front of Kinsey, despite her best effort to talk him down.

== Reviews ==
The novel received a positive review from Kirkus Reviews, which praised its plot, pace, poignancy, and realism.

Publishers Weekly gave a more mixed review, saying that it was an enjoyable read but finding flaws in its plot.
