= Paul A. Dayton =

American biomedical engineer

Paul A. Dayton is an American biomedical engineer known for innovations to ultrasound technology. He is a distinguished professor in the joint department of biomedical engineering at the University of North Carolina (UNC) and North Carolina State University (NCSU).

Dayton received a B.S. in physics from Villanova University in 1995, an M.E. in electrical engineering from the University of Virginia in 1998, and a Ph.D. in biomedical engineering in 2001, also from Virginia. He was a faculty member at the University of California, Davis, before joining the UNC–NCSU Joint Department of Biomedical Engineering in 2007.

Dayton began serving as interim chair of the joint department in 2019 and received his distinguished professor appointment that same year; he was named department chair in 2022. The department was renamed Lampe Joint Department of Biomedical Engineering in 2025. Dayton has co-founded several startups in the field of ultrasound technology, including SonoVol (later acquired by PerkinElmer) and SonoVascular, the latter of which develops technology to image blood clots.

== Awards ==
- IEEE Fellow, Institute of Electrical and Electronics Engineers, 2022
- College of Fellows, American Institute for Medical and Biological Engineering, 2018
