= D' =

D' may resemble:

- D' (D + apostrophe), the contracted form of words in several languages (for example, a French indefinite article); for a full list, see the Wiktionary entry
- Dʼ (D + modifier apostrophe), Slavic notation for palatalised d
- Ď, ď in lower case (D + caron), a letter of the Czech and Slovak alphabets
- D′ (D + prime), used for example to represent the sensitivity index in statistics
- Ḋ (D + overdot)
- Dʻ (D + ʻokina)
- Dʾ (D + right half ring)
- Dʿ (D + left half ring)
