= D-sharp =

D-sharp or D♯ may refer to:

- The musical pitch D♯
- D-sharp major musical scale
- D-sharp minor musical scale

== See also ==
- DSharp (born 1988), violinist
