= Deighton =

Deighton may refer to:

== People ==
- Ernest Deighton (1889–1957), English flying ace
- Jack Deighton, English footballer
- Jeremy Deighton (born 1988), American soccer player
- John Deighton (1830–1875), English Canadian bar owner
- Len Deighton (1929-2026), British author
- Matt Deighton, singer-songwriter, member of Mother Earth
- Michelle Deighton, model
- Paul Deighton, Baron Deighton, British Conservative politician

== Places in England ==
=== North Yorkshire ===
- Deighton, North Yorkshire, a village and civil parish in the former Hambleton district
- Deighton, York, a village and civil parish in the unitary authority of the City of York
- North Deighton, a village and civil parish in the former Harrogate district

=== West Yorkshire ===
- Deighton, Huddersfield, a district of Huddersfield

- Deighton railway station

- Kirk Deighton, a village and civil parish in Leeds metropolitan District

== See also ==
- Dayton (disambiguation)
- Dighton (disambiguation)
