= Triumph Daytona 675 =

British motorcycle

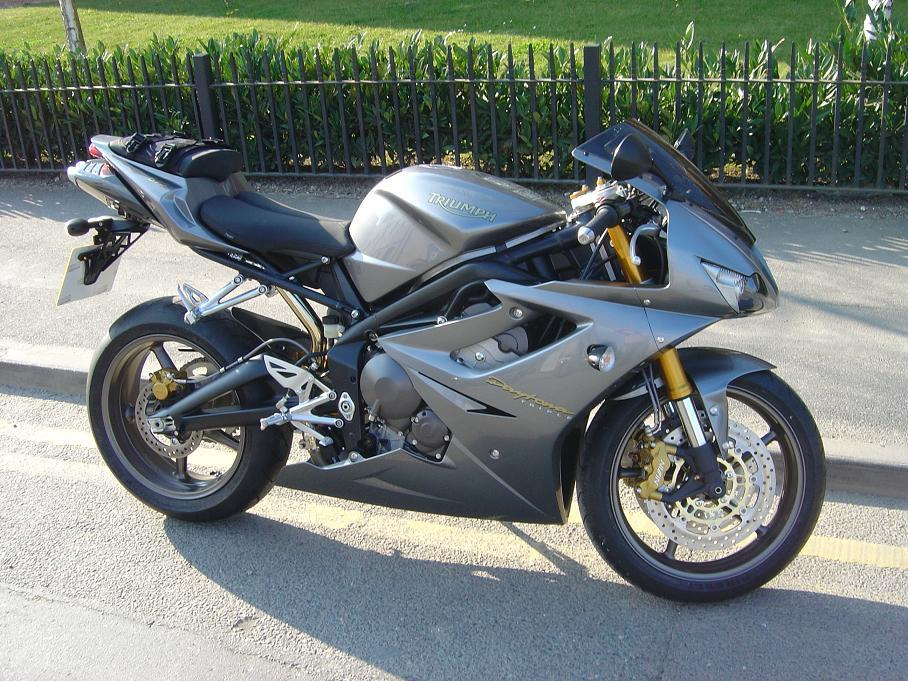
- Manufacturer: Triumph
- Also called: Daytona Triple, six-seven-five
- Production: 2006–2016; R model 2011–2017
- Predecessor: Triumph Daytona 650
- Successor: Triumph Daytona Moto2 765
- Class: Sport bike
- Engine: 675 cc (41.2 cu in), liquid-cooled, DOHC, inline-3
- Bore / stroke: 76.0 mm × 49.6 mm (2.99 in × 1.95 in)
- Compression ratio: 12.65:1
- Power: 126 hp (94 kW) @ 12600 rpm
- Torque: 54 lbf⋅ft (73 N⋅m) @ 11,750 rpm
- Transmission: 6-speed constant mesh
- Related: Triumph Street Triple; Triumph Daytona 955i

The Triumph Daytona 675 is a three-cylinder sport bike built by Triumph Motorcycles. It replaced the four-cylinder Daytona 650. The 675 proved to be remarkably light, nimble and powerful; at a maximum of 128 bhp it was also very quick, and it was very successful against the Japanese 600 cc competition. In 2016, Triumph ceased production of the base model Daytona 675 citing diminishing demand for super sport bikes and increasingly strict European emission standards. Triumph continued to produce the up-spec Triumph Daytona 675R model until the 2018 model year. Triumph filed a new trademark for the Daytona, fuelling rumors that there may be a future version sporting the new 765 cc engine. It turned out to be a 660, released in 2024.

== History and development ==
Triumph Daytona 675 development started in 2000 following the launch of the four-cylinder TT600. The TT600 was Triumph's first modern middleweight sports motorcycle, but it struggled to compete with Japanese 600 cc supersport motorcycles. So Triumph decided to manufacture a bike closer to its traditional values, making the crucial technical decision to adopt a three-cylinder power plant, instead of a four-cylinder as in the TT600.

In 2001, soon after the completion of the similarly three-cylinder-powered Triumph Daytona 955i, Triumph began engineering analysis to work out weight, engine performance in power and torque. Pleased with the figures, the project moved to the full concept phase in March 2002.

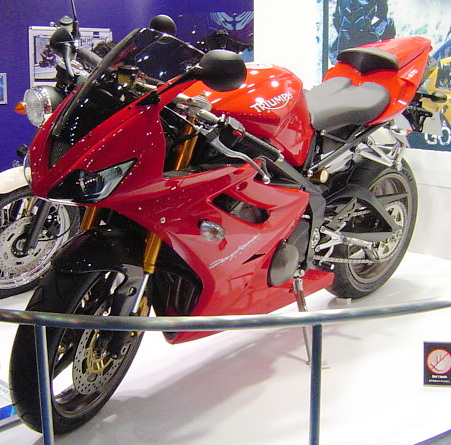
Triumph Daytona 675 in Tornado Red

Initial chassis development work was done using a chopped Daytona 600 chassis. Triumph moved the wheelbase, adjusted the head angle, and modified the tank. This new configuration exhibited better performance than the original Daytona 600, forming a basis to compare against competitive bikes such as the Kawasaki Ninja ZX-6R and Honda CBR600RR. While engine development had not been completed, computer aided chassis development continued with the data collected from these tests.

Design work for the Daytona 675 proceeded, producing a primarily black design based on the Daytona 600. However, this initial design was discarded as great British designs of the 1960s had "a flowing curved design – no sharp angular aggressive edges". A member of the engineering team produced a concept drawing of the 675 as a naked bike. Styling was based upon this concept drawing and that of the earlier T595 model. Styling development continued in house, staying close to spirit of earlier Triumph design. Market research groups made up of a variety of different classes of sportbike riders chose the latter design of bike which was refined and adopted for production.

The newly developed engine was first tested on a dynamometer in May 2003. Final development combining styling, engine, chassis into a prototype quickly followed. Prototype testing started in late 2004.

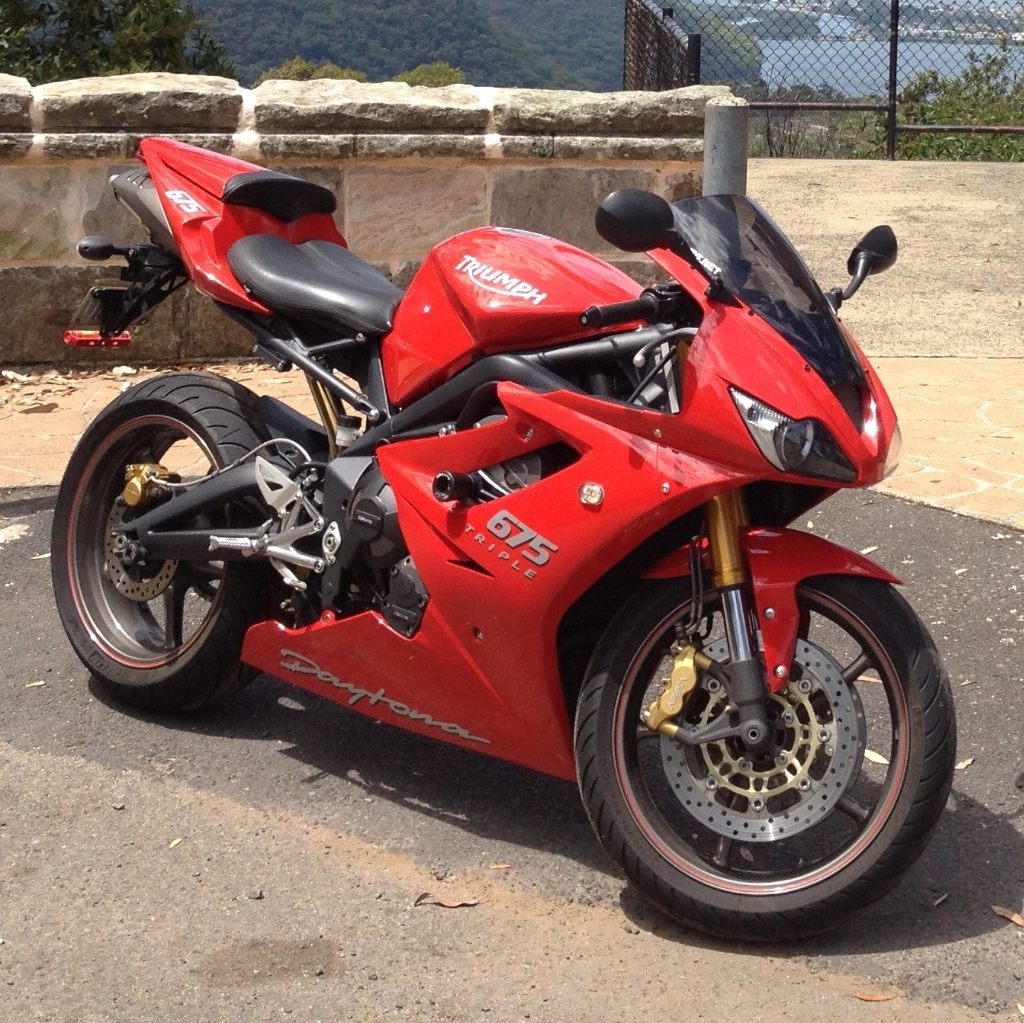
Daytona 675 with 2008 decals

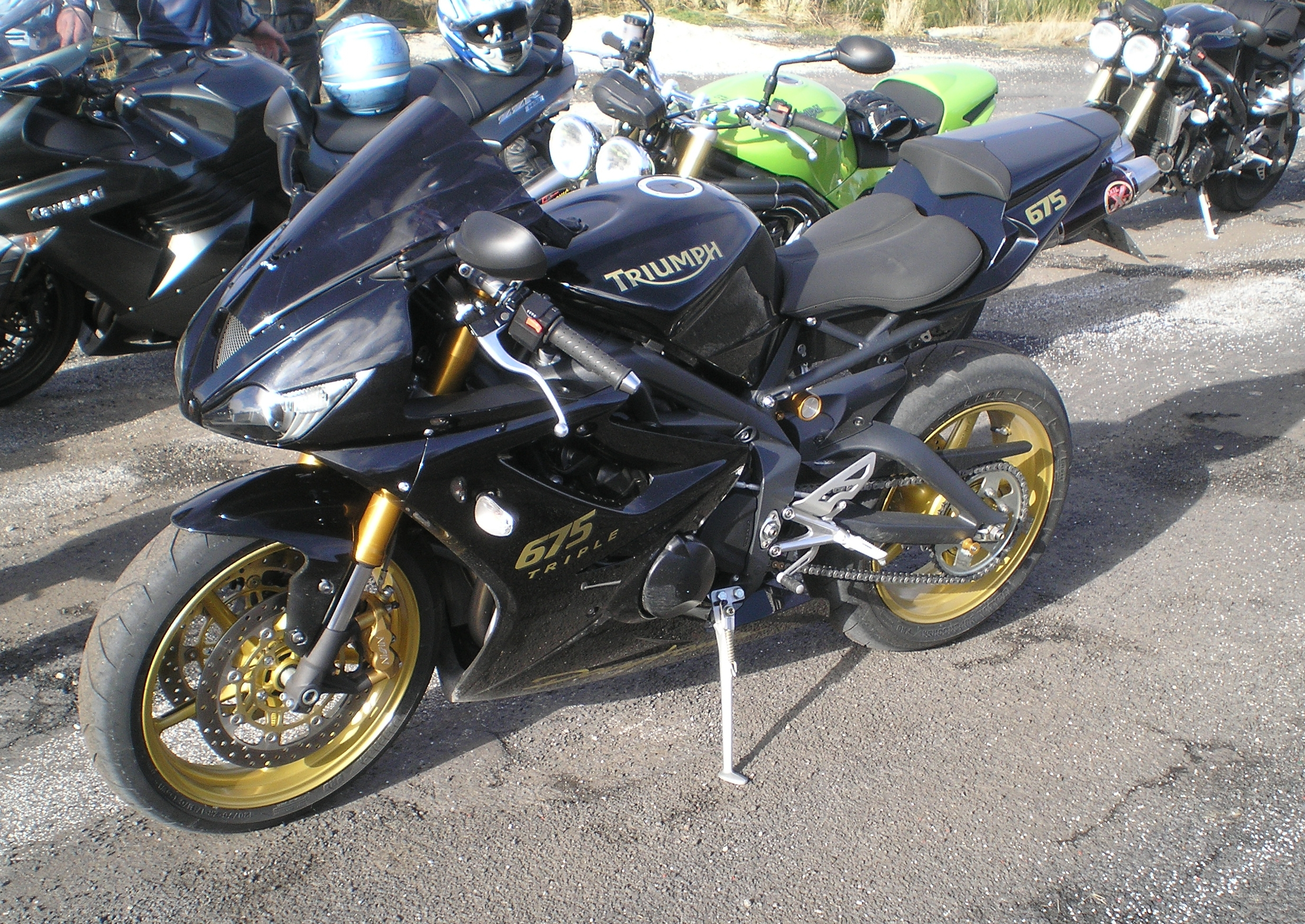
Daytona 675 Special Edition

The Daytona 675 was officially launched at the NEC International Motorcycle and Scooter Show in 2005. UK-based Bike was given an exclusive test ride prior to the official launch, impressing the magazine test rider. The magazine declared it "the best British sportsbike ever" and "possibly one of the greatest sportsbikes of all time".

The Daytona 675 won the Supersport category for the Masterbike 2006 (finishing third overall), and won again in 2007.

The 2008 model has a dry weight of 363.7 lb (165.0 kg) and wet weight of 407 lb (185 kg). Tested power output is rated at 104.4 hp (77.9 kW) @ 12,100 rpm with torque of 53.3 lbf⋅ft (72.3 N⋅m) @ 11,750 rpm.

== Reception ==
"Motor Cycle News" declared, "The Triumph Daytona 675 has put Hinckley firm back on the shortlist of many UK sports motorcycle riders, who previously rated the 600 and 650 Daytona models as being OK, but no real alternative to a Japanese four cylinder 600cc sportbikes. Silky, compact handling, allied to kick-ass engine power and a howling exhaust note, make the Triumph Daytona 675 a real winner on the road, or track."

Triumph intended to build only 4,000 Daytona 675 models for 2006, with 1,000 marked for the UK, 2,000 for the US, and 1,000 for the rest of the world. Customer demand was very strong, with waiting lists of three months or more in the US and the UK, and even longer in several other parts of the world.

In 2007, Performance Bikes Magazine ran a 24-hour racetrack comparison test between a Daytona 675 and a Suzuki GSXR750. Although a mechanical fault prevented the 675 from completing the test, the Triumph had till then consistently outpaced the more powerful Suzuki, averaging 0.7 seconds a lap faster. (It later transpired that the 675's engine failure was down to a broken valve, a result of incorrect servicing)

== Racing ==
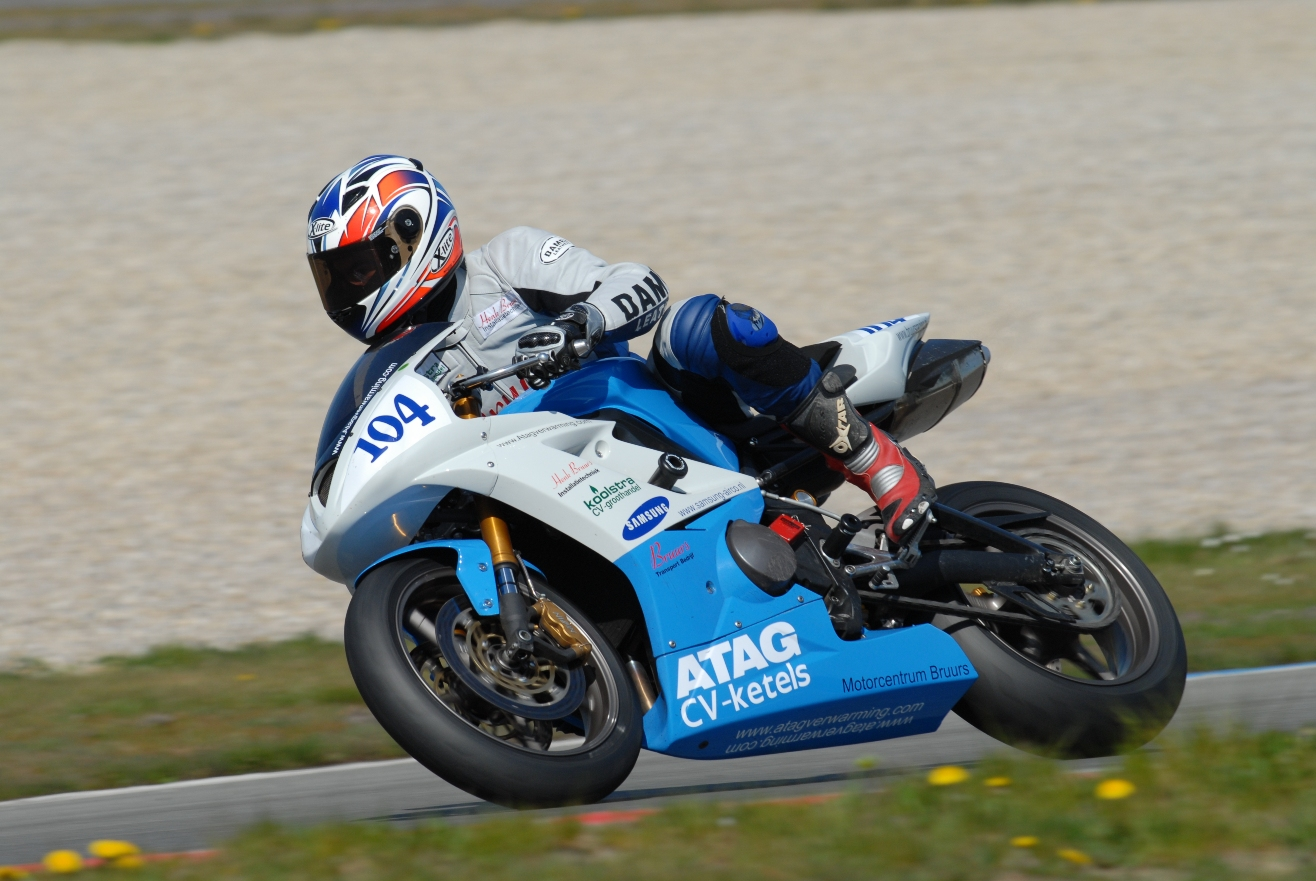
Triumph Daytona 675 racing

As the TT 600 morphed through the Daytona 600, 650, and finally became the 675, it produced considerable interest and more privateers entered AMA and regional events. When the Daytona 675 was launched there were no factory-backed racing teams. This changed in 2008 when MAP Embassy Racing struck a deal with Triumph, and entered the 2008 British Supersport Championship. On 5 May 2008, Glen Richards scored the first win for a Triumph-backed team since 2004 and scored three further wins on his way to the championship.

Before 2008 several privateers were racing the Triumph Daytona 675 without any official factory support. In the British Supersport Championship 2006, Daytonas were raced by Paul Young and Christian Elkin.

During the development phase, Triumph made representations to the Isle of Man TT for a 675 triple to race in the 600 class. With a successful outcome, a Daytona was raced by New Zealander Paul Dobbs in the 2006 TT. On 11 August 2006, The Triumph Daytona 675 was cleared for entry into the AMA Formula Xtreme class for 2007. The Daytona 675 was used by Team SC in the 2008 Supersport World Championship. The factory supported team was called Triumph-SC and has Garry McCoy and Ilario Dionisi as riders.

There is also a Daytona 675 one-make series called Triumph Triple Challenge. This is run in conjunction with Bemsee Race Club and operated under the Motorcycle Racing Organisation (MRO) format. It is a series run by T3 Racing over nine rounds, with a 2007 entry cost £12,000, which included ownership of a Daytona 675.

The Triumph Daytona 675 faces a different set of rules and restrictions when it competes in American Motorcycle Racing events. Although Triumph NA has not sponsored any American teams in the last several decades, privateers began racing Triumphs in AMA races as early as 2002 when the Augusta Triumph/Ducati Racing Team fielded a TT 600. It was the first Triumph to make the top 20 when it finished 17th at Road Atlanta.

In the same year (2007) that the Daytona 675 debuted in AMA events, Augusta Triumph/Ducati Racing Team members won regional titles at both the expert and novice levels in four racing categories. In May 2009, the Augusta Triumph/Ducati Racing Team had a podium finish in AMA; In their competition in Moto GT, the team of Mark Crozier and Phil Caudill scored with a first-place finish at Barber Motorsports Park. It marked as the first time a Triumph Daytona 675 took the pole in an AMA event. It led 19 of 40 laps and was also the first time that the Daytona 675 has ever placed first in an AMA event. The Augusta Triumph team went on to win the AMA Pro Moto GT1 season championship with one race remaining on the calendar.

The ParkinGO Triumph BE1 Racing World Supersport team also had a good run in 2009, finishing fifth in the manufacturer's standings in the team's first year of competition. Team rider Garry McCoy earned two podium finishes during the season, the first at Donington and the second at Portimao.

In 2010, the Augusta Triumph/Ducati Racing Team fielded their 675 in the WERA Southeast and North Florida regions, winning a total of four championships, WERA SE Heavyweight Twins Superbike Expert and Heavyweight Twins Superstock Expert; WERA North Florida Heavyweight Twins Superbike Expert and Heavyweight Twins Superstock Expert. In October, rider Giovanni Rojas added a fifth title by winning the 2010 Grand National Heavyweight Twins Superstock Expert Championship at Road Atlanta which gave the team a national title.

== Revisions ==
=== 2009 ===
The 2009 model of the Daytona had over 50 technical improvements according to Triumph. While the only cosmetic changes were to the front fairing and turn signals, the new model was lighter, the ECU was remapped to increase the rev limit and produce a power increase of 3 hp (2.2 kW), a taller first gear, and handling was improved through high and low speed dampers. In addition, the 2009 model's ECU is compatible with Triumph's OEM plug and play quickshifter.

=== 2010 ===
The 2010 model year was virtually unchanged from the 2009 Daytona 675 apart from a redesigned instrument cluster. The newer instruments have a more modern appearance, but do not offer any additional functionality compared to the older design.

Triumph also offered a 2010 Special Edition (SE) Daytona 675 with a Pearl White paint scheme on the bodywork, blue frame, adjustable levers and carbon fiber infill panels. Two versions of the SE were produced, one with the new 2010 instrument cluster and one without.

=== 2011 ===
The 2011 Daytona 675 Special Edition has the same Pearl White bodywork and Blue frame as the 2010 model, but also included as standard carbon fiber replacements for the cockpit infill panels, exhaust heat shield, exhaust cap, and rear hugger as well as Triumph's aftermarket adjustable levers. Unlike the 2010 SE, the 2011 SE also includes the updated gauge cluster first found in the standard 2010 model, as well as a new racing-inspired decal design.

=== 2011 Daytona 675R ===
First offered in early 2011, but still part of the 2011 model year, Triumph debuted the Daytona 675R. The 675R did not feature any changes to the engine, instead Triumph's focus was on the standard inclusion of Brembo front brakes, Öhlins suspension, and Triumph's quickshifter. The 675R has carbon fiber front mudguard, rear hugger, exhaust cap, heat shield, and cockpit infill panels.

=== 2013 ===
The 2013 Triple motor is more compact and a little more powerful due to a bigger bore and shorter stroke. The bike has a smaller, lighter and narrower frame. It has a bigger airbox, new swingarm, slipper clutch and lighter wheels. Other changes include a fuel gauge and a side-mounted exhaust instead of the underseat setup from previous models and rear Brembo brakes on the Standard 675. ABS is an option on the standard bike. The Jason DiSalvo edition 675 also was introduced in this year. Only 40 of them were built that feature a custom livery and accessories unique to them. They are numbered bikes, the build being etched into the handlebars. Jason DiSalvo personally signed the gas tank of each of the 40 675s.

=== 2014 ===
ABS made standard equipment. Slipper Clutch and Quick shifter (Up Shift only) is implemented. Triumph US made 47 Danny Eslick edition 675R's to commemorate the 47 years since Triumph had won the Daytona 200. Eslick won the 2014 Daytona 200 on the Riders Discount Triumph 675R.

== Specifications ==
All specifications are manufacturer claimed and estimated unless otherwise noted:

	2006	2007	2008	2009–2011	2011–12 675R	2013–16 675	2013–16 675R
Engine	675 cc (41.2 cu in) Liquid-cooled, 12 valve, DOHC, in-line 3-cylinder						
Bore × stroke	74.0 mm × 52.3 mm (2.91 in × 2.06 in)					76.0 mm × 49.6 mm (2.99 in × 1.95 in)	
Compression ratio	12.65:1					13.1:1	
Fuel system	Multipoint sequential electronic fuel injection with twin injectors, forced air induction and SAI						
Ignition	Digital – inductive type – via electronic engine management system						
Power	79.78 kW (106.99 bhp) (rear wheel) @ 12500 rpm	92 kW (123 hp) @ 12,500 rpm	92 kW (123 hp) @ 12,500 rpm	92 kW (124 hp) @ 12,600 rpm 82.19 kW (110.22 hp) (rear wheel)		128 hp (95 kW) @ 12,500 rpm (claimed)	
Torque	64.39 N⋅m (47.49 lbf⋅ft) (rear wheel)@ 9900 rpm	72.3 N⋅m (53.3 lbf⋅ft) @ 11,750 rpm	72.3 N⋅m (53.3 lbf⋅ft) @ 11,750 rpm	72 N⋅m (53 lbf⋅ft) @ 11,700 rpm 64.65 N⋅m (47.68 lbf⋅ft) (rear wheel)		75 N⋅m (55 lbf⋅ft) @ 11,900 rpm (claimed)	
Drivetrain	Gear primary, multi-plate wet clutch, 6-speed, close ratio gearbox, O-ring chain					Gear primary, Wet, multi-plate, slipper, 6-speed, close ratio gearbox, O-ring chain	
Frame	Aluminium beam twin spar. Rear – 2 piece high pressure die cast						
Swingarm	Braced, twin-sided, aluminium alloy with adjustable pivot position						
Front wheel	Cast aluminium alloy 5-spoke, 17 in × 3.5 in (432 mm × 89 mm)						
Rear wheel	Cast aluminium alloy 5-spoke, 17 in × 5.5 in (430 mm × 140 mm)						
Front tyre	120/70 ZR 17						
Rear tyre	180/55 ZR 17						
Front suspension	41 mm (1.6 in) USD forks with adjustable pre-load, rebound and compression damping.			41 mm (1.6 in) USD forks with adjustable preload, rebound and compression damping, 110mm travel.	Öhlins 43mm upside down NIX30 forks with adjustable preload, rebound and compression damping, 120mm travel.	Kayaba 41 mm upside down forks with adjustable preload, rebound and compression damping, 110mm travel.	Öhlins 43 mm upside down NIX30 forks with adjustable preload, rebound and high/low speed compression damping, 120 mm travel.
Rear suspension	Monoshock with piggy back reservoir adjustable for pre-load, rebound and compression damping.			Monoshock with piggy back reservoir adjustable for preload, rebound and high/low speed comporession damping, 130 mm rear wheel travel.	Öhlins TTX36 twin tube monoshock with piggy back reservoir, adjustable, rebound and compression damping, 130mm rear wheel travel.	Kayaba monoshock with piggy back reservoir adjustable for rebound and high/low speed compression damping, 130mm rear wheel travel.	Öhlins TTX36 twin tube monoshock with piggy back reservoir, adjustable, rebound and compression damping, 133mm rear wheel travel.
Front brakes	Twin 308 mm (12.1 in) floating discs, 4 piston radial callipers with radial master cylinder.			Twin 308 mm (12.1 in) floating discs, Nissin 4 piston radial monobloc calipers.	Twin 308mm floating discs, Brembo 4-piston radial mono-block calipers.	Twin 310mm floating discs, Nissin 4-piston radial mono-block calipers. (Switchable ABS)	Twin 310mm floating discs, Brembo 4-piston radial mono-block calipers. (Switchable ABS)
Rear brakes	Single 220 mm (8.7 in) disc, single piston caliper.			Single 220 mm disc, Nissin single piston caliper.		Single 220 mm disc, Brembo single piston caliper. (Switchable ABS)	
Dimensions
Length	2,010 mm (79 in)			2,020 mm (80 in)		2,045 mm (80.5 in)	
Width	710 mm (28 in)					695 mm (27.4 in)	
Height	1,109 mm (43.7 in)			1,105 mm (43.5 in)		1,112 mm (43.8 in)	
Seat height	825 mm (32.5 in)			830 mm (33 in)		830 mm (33 in)	
Wheelbase	1,392 mm (54.8 in)			1,415 mm (55.7 in)	1,395 mm (54.9 in)	1,375 mm (54.1 in)	
Rake/Trail	23.5°/86.8 mm (3.42 in)			23.9º/89.1 mm (3.51 in)		22.9º/87.2 mm (3.43 in)	
Dry weight	176 kg (389 lb)	165.0 kg (363.7 lb)	165.0 kg (363.7 lb)	161 kg (356 lb)		167 kg (368 lb)	
Wet weight	189 kg (417 lb)			185 kg (407 lb)		184 kg (405 lb)	
Fuel tank capacity	17.4 L (3.8 imp gal; 4.6 US gal)						
Performance
0 to 60 mph (0 to 97 km/h)	3.2 sec.				3.3 sec.		3.3 sec.
0 to 1/4 mi (0.00 to 0.40 km)	10.76 sec. @ 208.10 km/h (129.31 mph)				11.0 sec.		11.1 sec.
Top speed	249 km/h (155 mph)			253.1 km/h (157.3 mph)			
Fuel economy	7.0 L/100 km; 40.5 mpg_{‑imp} (33.7 mpg_{‑US})					6.11 L/100 km; 46.2 mpg_{‑imp} (38.5 mpg_{‑US})	
