= Sugar Creek (South Grand River tributary) =

Stream in the U.S. state of Missouri

Sugar Creek is a stream in Cass County in the U.S. state of Missouri. It is a tributary of the South Grand River.

The stream headwaters arise at 38°36′14″N 94°15′10″W approximately six miles southeast of Harrisonville and 1.5 miles east of the community of Daugherty. The stream crosses under Missouri Route 7 two miles southeast of Daugherty and flows generally south for approximately ten miles to its confluence with the South Grand River at the southern border of Cass County. The confluence is just west of the Settles Ford Conservation Area at 38°27′13″N 94°12′36″W and an elevation of 761 feet.

Sugar Creek was named for the sugar maple trees lining its course.

== See also ==
- List of rivers of Missouri
