= Jim Deaton =

American football player and coach

Playing career
- c. 1972: Carson–Newman

Coaching career (HC unless noted)
- ?–1999: Carson–Newman (DC)
- 2001–2004: Carson–Newman
- 2005–2007: Campbellsville

Head coaching record
- Overall: 4–26

Jim Deaton is an American former football coach. He served as the head football coach at Campbellsville University from 2005 to 2007, compiling a record of 4–26.

== Coaching career ==
Deaton was the third head football coach at Campbellsville University in Campbellsville, Kentucky serving for three seasons, from 2005 until 2007. His coaching record at Campbellsville was 4–26.

== Head coaching record ==
Year	Team	Overall	Conference	Standing	Bowl/playoffs
Campbellsville Tigers (Mid-South Conference) (2005–2007)
2005	Campbellsville	2–8	2–6 / 2–3 (West)	T–4th (West)	
2006	Campbellsville	2–8	2–3	T–3rd (West)	
2007	Campbellsville	0–10	0–5	6th (West)	
Campbellsville:		4–26	4–14		
Total:		4–26			
