= Dayton Wire Wheels =

Tire company by Daytona Corporation

Dayton Wire Wheels (sometimes referred to as Dayton rims, Dayton wheels, or simply Daytons) are a brand of wire-spoke wheels made for cars and trucks. The company was founded in December 1916 in Dayton, Ohio. Ford Motor Company endorsed the product by offering Dayton steel wire wheels as an option for the Model T.

== Cultural significance ==
=== Lowrider culture ===
In the 1980s, Dayton Wire Wheels became associated with lowrider culture after editors from Lowrider magazine approached company executives at an automotive trade show. The company subsequently began receiving custom orders from customers in East Los Angeles, including requests for 13-inch wheels, 20-inch wheels, gold-plated sets, and wheels painted in gang colors. According to company vice president Joe Guilfoyle, "We really didn't have to do anything. We started getting the orders, and the next thing we know, everybody was killing each other for them."

The wheels' straight-laced spoke design and knock-off hubs distinguished them from competitors in the lowrider market. By the early 1980s, Dayton wheels had become status symbols within lowrider culture, with the 13-inch and 14-inch reversed spoke wheels being particularly popular.

=== Hip-hop culture ===
By the early 1990s, West Coast hip hop had adopted lowrider culture, with Dayton wheels appearing in music videos such as Dr. Dre's "Nuthin' but a 'G' Thang" in 1993. The wheels have been referenced in songs by hip-hop artists including Snoop Dogg and LL Cool J, and are commonly referred to as "Daytons" or "D's" within hip-hop culture.
