= Triumph Daytona 650 =

British motorcycle

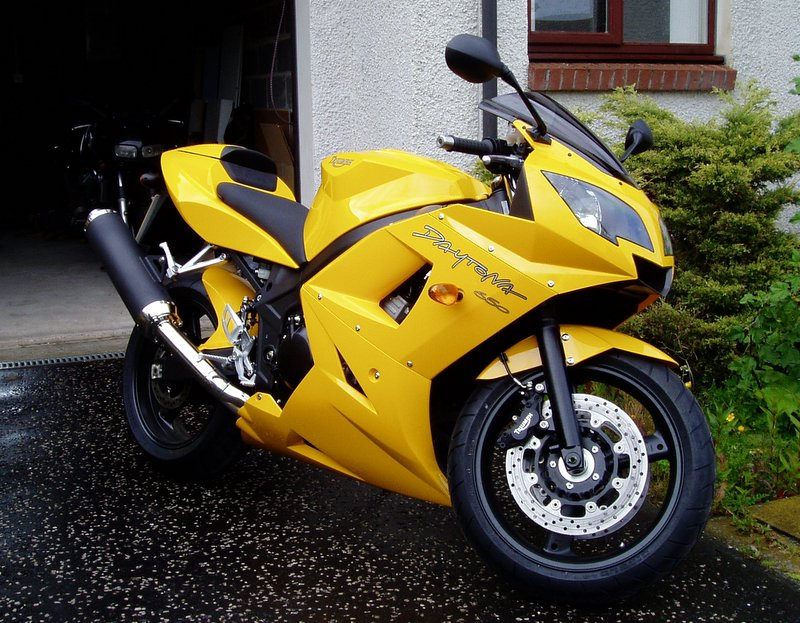
- Manufacturer: Triumph
- Production: 2005
- Predecessor: Triumph Daytona 600
- Successor: Triumph Daytona 675
- Class: Sport bike
- Engine: 646 cc (39.4 cu in), liquid-cooled, DOHC, inline-4
- Bore / stroke: 68.0 mm × 44.5 mm (2.68 in × 1.75 in)
- Compression ratio: 12.9:1
- Power: 114.00 hp (85 kW) @ 12500 rpm
- Transmission: 6 speed, chain drive
- Suspension: Front: 43 mm forks with adjustable preload, compression and rebound damping Rear: Monoshock with adjustable preload and rebound damping
- Brakes: Front: Double disc. 4-piston calipers. 308 mm (12.1 in); Rear: Single disc. Single piston calipers. 220 mm (8.7 in)
- Tyres: Front:120/70 ZR 17; Rear: 180/55 ZR 17
- Rake, trail: 24.6 degrees
- Wheelbase: 1,390 mm (55 in)
- Dimensions: L: 2,112 mm (83.1 in); W: 712 mm (28.0 in); H: 1,131 mm (44.5 in)
- Seat height: 815 mm (32.1 in)
- Weight: 165.0 kg (363.8 lb) (dry)
- Fuel capacity: 16.6 L (3.7 imp gal; 4.4 US gal)
- Related: Triumph Daytona 955i

The Triumph Daytona 650 is a super sports bike built by British manufacturer Triumph Motorcycles in 2005.

It was superseded by the three cylinder Triumph Daytona 675 released in 2006.

== Specifications ==
	2005
Engine
Type	Liquid-cooled, DOHC, in-line 4-cylinder
Capacity	646.00 cc (39.42 cu in)
Bore/Stroke	68.0 mm × 44.5 mm (2.7 in × 1.8 in)
Compression Ratio	12.9:1
Fuel System	Injection. Twin-butterfly, multipoint sequential electronic fuel injection with forced air induction. DOHC
Ignition	Digital - inductive type - via electronic engine management system
Transmission
Primary Drive	Gear
Final Drive	Chain
Clutch	Wet, multi-plate
Gearbox	
Cycle Parts
Frame	Aluminium beam perimeter
Swingarm	
Front Wheel	
Rear Wheel	
Front Tire	120/70 ZR 17
Rear Tire	180/55 ZR 17
Front Suspension	2 inches (51 mm) forks with adjustable preload, compression and rebound damping
Rear Suspension	Monoshock with adjustable preload and rebound damping
Front Brakes	Double disc. 4-piston calipers. 308 mm (12.1 in)
Rear Brakes	Single disc. Single piston calipers. 220 mm (8.7 in)
Dimensions
Length	2,112 mm (83.1 in)
Width	712 mm (28.0 in)
Height	1,131 mm (44.5 in)
Seat Height	815 mm (32.1 in)
Wheelbase	1,390 mm (55 in)
Rake/Trail	24.6°
Weight (Dry)	165.0 kg (363.8 lb)
Fuel Tank Capacity	16.6 L (3.7 imp gal; 4.4 US gal)
Performance (Measured at crankshaft to DIN 70020)
Maximum Power	114.00 hp (85 kW) @ 12500 rpm
Maximum Torque	68.00 N·m (6.9 kgf·m or 50.2 ft·lbf) @ 11500 rpm
Misc
Colours	Tornado Red, Racing Yellow
