= Triumph Street Triple =

Standard motorcycle

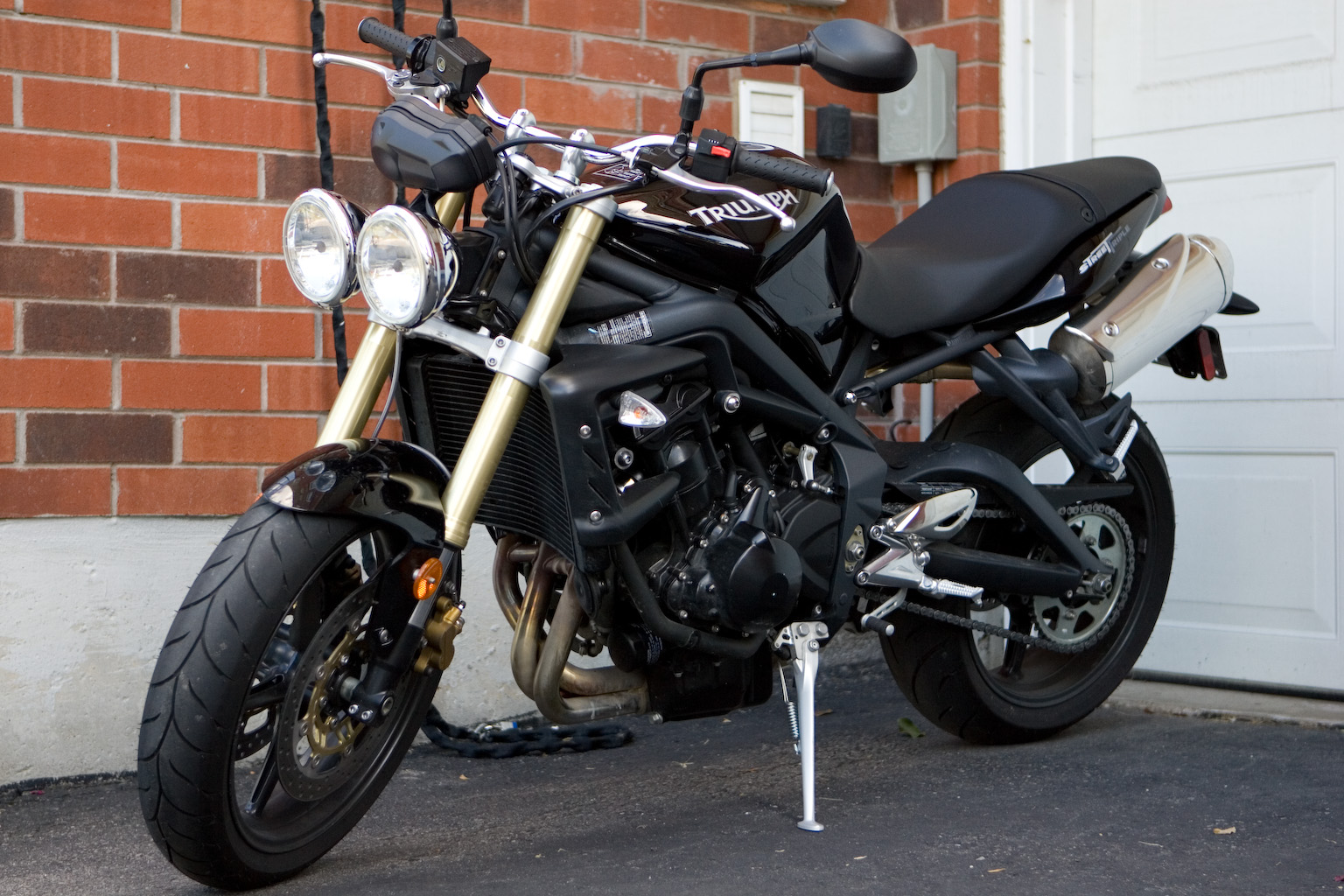
- First generation Street Triple 675
- Manufacturer: Triumph
- Class: Standard
- Engine: 674.8–765 cc (41.18–46.68 cu in) liquid-cooled DOHC inline-3
- Bore / stroke: 74.0 mm × 52.3 mm (2.91 in × 2.06 in)
- Compression ratio: 12.65:1
- Power: 79 kW (106 hp) @ 11,850 rpm(claimed)
- Torque: 68.1 N⋅m (50.2 ft⋅lb) @ 9,750 rpm(claimed)
- Tyres: 120/70 ZR 17 Dunlop Sportmax Qualifier (front); 180/55 ZR 17 Dunlop Sportmax Qualifier
- Rake, trail: 24.3°, 95.3 mm (3.75 in)
- Wheelbase: 1,395 mm (54.9 in)
- Dimensions: L: 2,030 mm (80 in); W: 736 mm (29.0 in); H: 1,250 mm (49 in)
- Seat height: 800 mm (31 in)
- Fuel capacity: 17.4 L (3.8 imp gal; 4.6 US gal)
- Related: Triumph Daytona 675

The Triumph Street Triple is a standard motorcycle made by Triumph Motorcycles since 2007. The bike is closely modelled on the Speed Triple 1050 but uses a detuned inline three cylinder 675 cc engine from the Daytona 675 sport bike, which was released in 2006.

== Background ==
In 2007, a number of spy photos and speculative design drawings were reported in the motorcycle press, with one magazine capturing a road test of the completed Street Triple. Later articles reported on leaked design shots of the new bike. A report on the showcasing of the finished bike to dealers was published on 6 March 2007, along with a spy video of a test ride.

== First generation (2007–2011) ==
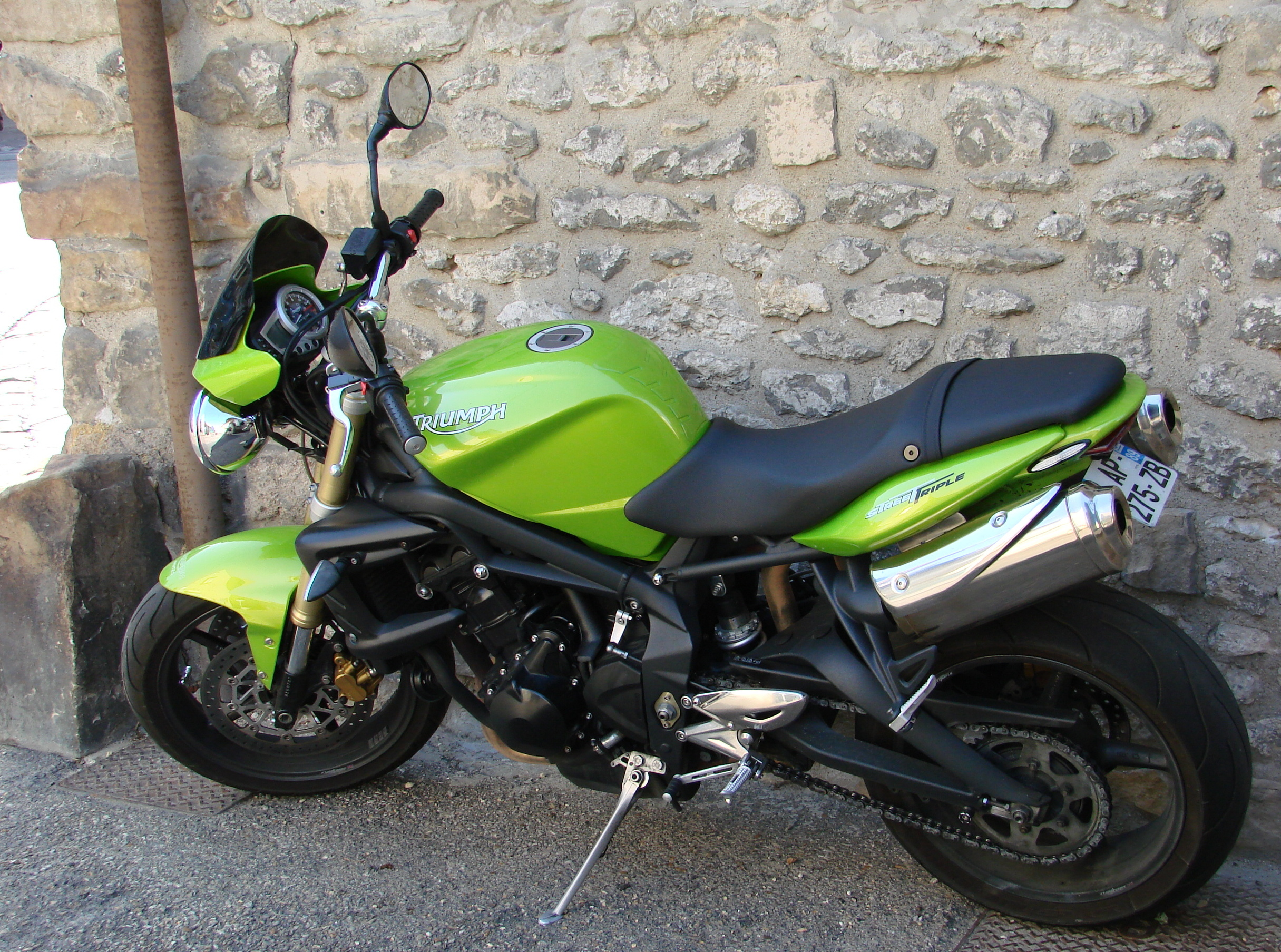
First generation Street Triple

The Triumph Street Triple was launched on October 1st, 2007, to replace the 600 Speed Four. It shares the design of the modern Triumph naked models, introduced on the Speed Triple in 2005, with high-mount twin mufflers, dual circular headlights with a dashboard unit mounted on the top. The biggest difference with the Street Triple is the conventional swingarm, instead of the single-sided unit on the Speed Triple. Many parts are shared with the Triumph Daytona 675, mainly visible on the frame and swingarm. The 675cc three cylinder engine, borrowed from the Daytona 675, is re-tuned to make it more street friendly and usable as a daily rider naked, but still powerful in the category with 79 kW (106 bhp) @ 11,750 rpm. Since the Daytona 675 engine is a triple cylinder, Triumph introduced a new naming instead of adding the displacement to the Speed Triple name, making it a brand new model in Triumph history.

Launched in 2008, the Street Triple R shares the same engine and chassis as the standard model but has fully adjustable suspension both front and rear which is shared with the Daytona. The revised rear suspension results in a slightly higher seat height over the standard model and sharper rake. The front brakes are also shared with the Triumph 675 Daytona, with a fully radial Nissin setup, master cylinder and calipers. It has other minor equipment differences over the standard bike in the way of handlebars, seat, and different colour schemes, which were matte orange and matte grey.

== Second generation (2011–2012) ==
The Street Triple's circular headlights were changed to an angular shape for the 2012 model year, in line with the new identity of modern naked models, changed for the 2011 Speed Triple 1050 model. It was controversial at the time, because the circular headlights has been the identity of the modern naked models since 1997 and was quickly nicknamed the bugeye model from the bug like appearance the lights give the bike. The other changes includes redesigned side casings, brushed aluminum finish around the exhausts, black finish rear sets and revised stickers. The modifications were only cosmetics on both Street Triple and Street Triple R models, no changes were made on the engine, nor on the cycle parts.

== Third generation (2013–2017) ==
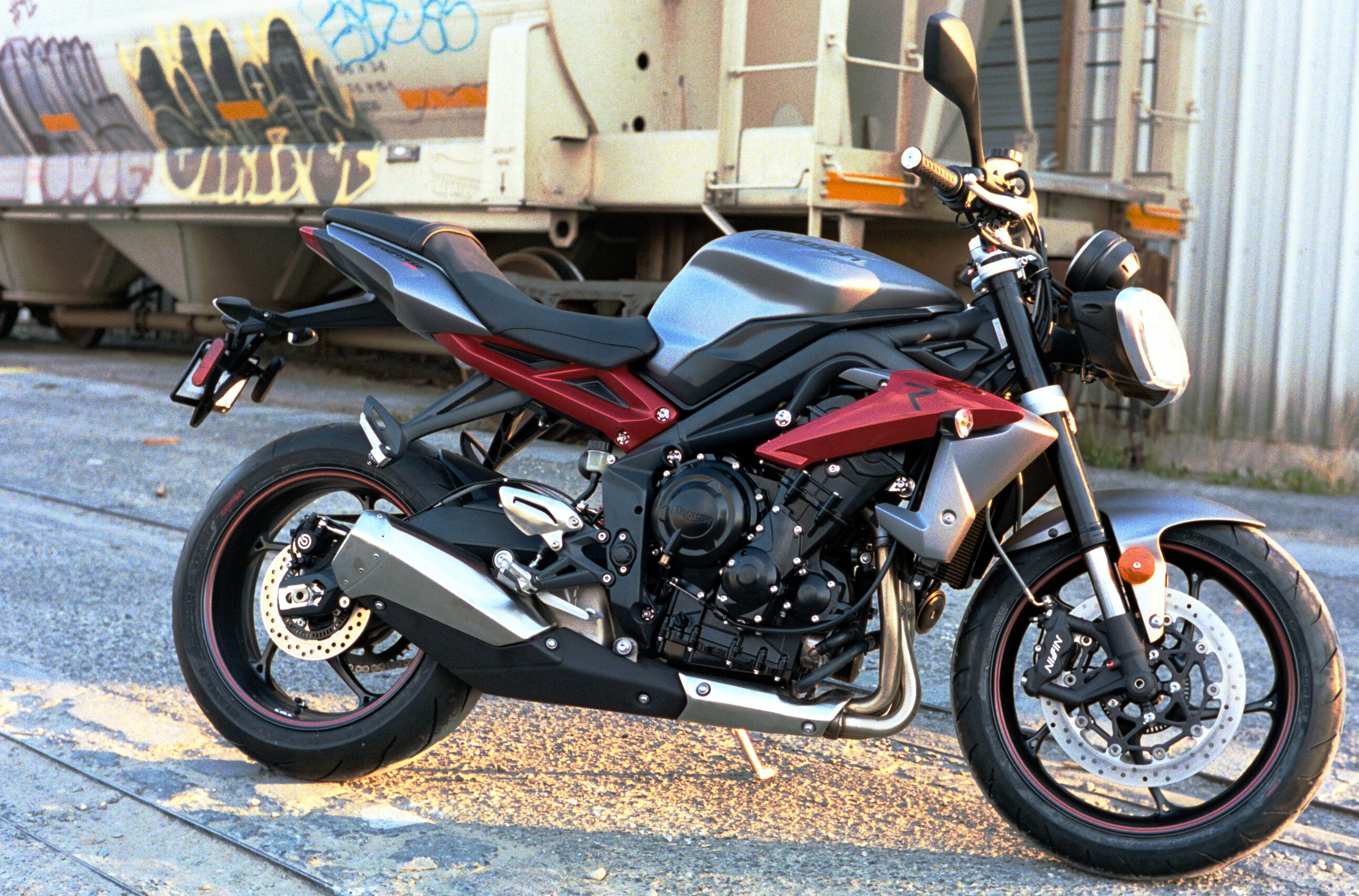
The 2014 Street Triple has slanted headlights and a low-mounted exhaust. The R version, shown, has upgraded suspension and red accents on the frame and wheels.

In 2013, Triumph remodeled the chassis of the Street Triple. It includes a new frame unit, which is still in aluminum, but with fewer parts and welds. The caster angle is steeper, from 24.3° (on the previous model) to 24.1°. The old tubular sub-frame is changed for a new aluminum cast sub-frame unit. The most distinctive modification is a new exhaust mounted underneath the engine, replacing the underseat exhaust from the previous version, moving the centre of mass forwards and down. Lighter rims are also mounted on the bike. All these modifications make the bike both lighter and more agile; total mass was reduced by 6 kg, which is the lightest generation of Street Triples. The engine remained unchanged while the 1st gear was made considerably taller by taking the gear ratios from the Daytona 675. The 675 Street Triple gains also new suspensions, new brake discs that can be assisted by a multi-mode disengageable ABS, a coded key, more space under the saddle, a dashboard enriched with a fuel gauge, an improved finish, new mirrors and a discreet modification at the base of the tank.

The Street Triple R gains a red sub-frame and the caster angle is narrower from 23,9° (on the previous model) to 23,4°. The R model remains distinctive with 19mm radial master cylinder and radial 4 pistons brake calipers around 310mm discs. The suspensions with a 41mm inverted fork and separate reservoir shock are adjustable for rebound, compression and preload. A disconnectable and configurable is available as an option. .

In February 2015 Triumph released the Street Triple Rx, based on the R model, with the angular seat unit from the Daytona 675, a quick-shifter and different colours (where the rims are red in any colour scheme).

== Fourth generation (2018–) ==
In January 2017, Triumph announced they would replace the 675 cc Street Triple with a new range of 765 cc (46.7 cu in) Street Triples. The model was released as a 2018 model. Despite having a capacity increase of 90 cc (5.5 cu in), the new models weigh slightly less than the first and second generations of 675 cc bike, and the engine casings are just as compact. This generation comes with three models in the range, the base model S, intermediate R, and the new highest specification named RS. Like previous models, the headlights styling is shared with the 2016 Speed Triple. As well as having different levels of equipment, such as brakes, suspension, and a quick shifter, the three models have different power outputs: 113 hp (84 kW) for the S, 118 hp (88 kW) for the R, and 123 hp (92 kW) for the RS. The fourth model is for the UK's A2 license, a 660 cc (40 cu in) version of the S will also be sold. Triumph also debuted the Low Ride Height (LRH) version of the R model which drops the seat height to 780mm. This model reduces the stroke on the front, shortens the rear shock, eliminating rebound adjustment, and lowers the seat profile. All other aspects are identical to the R model.

=== Mid cycle update (2020) ===
For 2020, the Street Triple was given a mid cycle update. The more track-oriented RS version was given minor changes to the intake and exhaust with no change in power output, and cosmetic changes to the mirrors and headlight. A 1.8 in (46 mm) lower seat height version, with a different seat and modified suspension, was added. The 2020 model was homologated by the FIM for racing in the World Supersport Next Generation class in 2022

=== 2023 update ===
In 2023, the R and RS versions got an updated more powerful engine of up to 130 horsepower, shorter gearing, higher-spec Brembo Stylema brakes (for the RS) and revised chassis geometry (raising the back reduced the wheelbase, rake and trail, leading to sharper steering). For the first time, IMU-based cornering ABS and traction control were added. The R now comes with a full-TFT instrument cluster (although smaller than the 5-inch version on the RS). Fuel tank capacity was reduced by 2.4 liters to 15 liters. A new limited edition Moto2 version was introduced, with clip-ons instead of handlebars and further track-oriented improvements.

== Fifth generation (2027–) ==
In October 2026, Triumph announced they would replace the 765 cc Street Triple with a new 798 cc model in January 2027. Despite having a capacity increase of 33 cc, the new model is claimed to weigh 5kg less than the previous model, while maintaining the same fuel capacity of 15L. The larger engine size was achieved by increasing engine stroke from 53.4 mm to 55.7 mm, while maintaining a bore of 78.0 mm from the previous model. Peak engine power was claimed to increase from 128 hp to 133 hp, while peak engine torque was claimed to increase from 59 ft·lb to 63 ft·lb. Rear tire sizing was increased from 180 to 190. Production was consolidated to a single RS trim level model.

== Special models ==
2011 - Street Triple Ace 675 CR

2014 - Street Triple R Team Empire Special Edition

2016 - Street Triple R 10th anniversary

2020 - Street Triple 765 RS Harley Quinn

2023 - Street Triple 765 RS Moto2 Edition

2024 - Street Triple 765 Moto2

== Related models ==
In 2010, Triumph launched the Tiger 800 and Tiger 800 XC, which use a longer stroke version of the Street Triple engine.

== Use in racing ==
Starting from 2019, the Moto2 class of World Championship racing has been powered by specially tuned Triumph-supplied 765 cc engines based on the Street Triple, replacing the engines that were previously based on the Honda CBR600RR from 2010 to 2018. A three-year contract extension to provide engines for seasons 2022–2024 was obtained in 2021.

During 2021, the 765 engine was trialled in the British Supersport Championship which normally has a 675 capacity limit for three-cylinder engines. Together with models from Ducati and MV, engines with a larger capacity than previously are to be allowed into Supersport World Championship racing from 2022.

== Specification ==
Year	2007–2012 Street Triple	2009–2012 Street Triple R	2013–2016 Street Triple	2013–2016 Street Triple R	2017– Street Triple S	2017– Street Triple R	2017– Street Triple RS	2023 - Street Triple RS
Engine	674.8 cc (41.18 cu in) transverse inline-3, DOHC, 4V/cyl, liquid cooled				765 cc (46.68 cu in) transverse inline-3, DOHC, 4V/cyl, liquid cooled			
Bore × stroke	74 mm × 52.3 mm (2.91 in × 2.06 in)				77.994 x 53.38 mm ( 3.14 in x 2.10 in)			
Fuel system	Keihin EFI		Multipoint sequential EFI SAI		Electronic Fuel Injection			
Compression ratio	12.65:1				12.66:1			13.25:1
Crankshaft horsepower (claimed)	79 kW (106 bhp) @ 11,750 rpm				83.1 kW (111.4 bhp) @ 11,250 rpm	86.8 kW (116.4 bhp) @ 12,000 rpm	90.4 kW (121.2 bhp) @ 11,700 rpm	95 kW (128 bhp) @ 12,000 rpm
Crankshaft torque (claimed)	68 N⋅m (50 lbf⋅ft) @ 9,100 rpm				73 N⋅m (54 lbf⋅ft) @ 9,100 rpm	77 N⋅m (57 lbf⋅ft) @ 9,400 rpm	77 N⋅m (57 lbf⋅ft) @ 10,800 rpm	80 N⋅m (59 lbf⋅ft) @ 9,500 rpm
Rear wheel horsepower	68.1 kW (91.3 hp) @ 11,750 rpm						94.16 kW (126.27 bhp) @ 11,750 rpm	
Rear wheel torque	60.2 N⋅m (44.4 ft⋅lb) @ 8250 rpm						80 N⋅m (59 lbf⋅ft) @ 9,500 rpm	
Transmission	Multi-plate wet clutch, 6-speed				Multi-plate wet clutch, 6-speed			
Final drive	O-ring chain				XW-ring, 118 link			
Frame	Aluminium beam twin-spar				Front - Aluminium beam twin spar Rear - 2 piece high pressure die cast			
Front suspension	Kayaba (KYB) 41 mm telescopic fork				Showa 41mm upside down separate function forks (SFF)	Showa 41mm upside down separate function big piston forks (SF-BPF)	Showa 41mm upside down big piston forks (BPF)	
Front suspension adjustment	None	Preload, compression and rebound	None	Preload, compression and rebound	Preload	Preload, compression and rebound	Preload, compression and rebound	
Front fork travel	120 mm (4.7 in)			115 mm (4.5 in)	110 mm (4.33 in)	115mm (4.5 in)	115mm (4.5 in)	
Rear suspension	Kayaba monoshock				Showa piggyback reservoir monoshock		Öhlins STX40 piggyback reservoir monoshock	
Rear adjustment	Preload			Preload, compression, and rebound	Preload	Preload, compression, and rebound	Preload, compression, and rebound	
Rear travel	126 mm (5.0 in)	130 mm (5.1 in)	126 mm (5.0 in)	135 mm (5.3 in)	124 mm (4.88 in)	134 mm (5.27 in)	131 mm (5.15 in)	
Brakes, front	Dual 308 mm discs	Dual Nissin 308 mm discs	Dual Nissin 310 mm discs, ABS		Dual 310 mm Nissin 2-piston, ABS	Dual 310 mm Brembo M4.32 4-piston radial monobloc, ABS (switchable)	Dual 310 mm Brembo M50 4-piston radial monobloc, ABS (switchable)	
Brakes, rear	220 mm disc	Nissin 220 disc	Brembo 220 mm disc, ABS		Single 220 mm Brembo fixed disc, ABS	Single 220 mm Brembo fixed disc, ABS (switchable)	Single 220 mm Brembo fixed disc, ABS (switchable)	
Wheels	Front: 3.5x17in Rear: 5.5x17in							
Tires	Front: 120/70 ZR 17; Rear: 180/55 ZR 17							
Fuel capacity	17.4 L (3.8 imp gal; 4.6 US gal)							
Height (w/o mirrors)	1,060 mm (42 in)	1,110 mm (44 in)	1,060 mm (42 in)	1,110 mm (44 in)			1,085 mm (42.7 in)	
Dry weight							166 kg (366 lb)	
Wet weight	182 kg (401 lb)							
Width	735 mm (28.9 in)	2009–2010: 735 mm (28.9 in); 2011–2012: 755 mm (29.7 in)	735 mm (28.9 in)	740 mm (29 in)				
Length	2,000 mm (79 in)	2,030 mm (80 in)	2,000 mm (79 in)	2,055 mm (80.9 in)				
Wheelbase	2007–2009: 1,394.5 mm (54.90 in); 2010: 1,390 mm (55 in); 2011–2012: 1,410 mm (56 in)	2009–2010: 1,394.5 mm (54.90 in); 2011–2012: 1,410 mm (56 in)	1,410 mm (56 in)	1,410 mm (56 in)			1,410 mm (56 in)	
Rake, trail	24.3, 95.3 mm (3.75 in)	23.9, 92.4 mm (3.64 in)	24.1, 99.6 mm (3.92 in)	23.4, 95 mm (3.7 in)	24.7, 104.2 mm (4.10 in)	23.8, 99 mm (3.89 in)	23.9, 100.8 mm (3.96 in)	
