= Triumph Daytona 600 =

- Triumph Daytona 600
- Manufacturer: Triumph
- Production: 2002–2004
- Predecessor: Triumph TT600
- Successor: Triumph Daytona 650
- Class: Sport bike
- Engine: 599 cc (36.6 cu in), liquid-cooled, DOHC, inline-4
- Bore / stroke: 68.0 mm × 41.3 mm (2.68 in × 1.63 in)
- Compression ratio: 12.5:1
- Power: 110.00 hp (82.03 kW) @ 12750 rpm
- Torque: 50.2 lbf⋅ft (68.1 N⋅m) @ 11,000 rpm
- Transmission: 6-speed, manual chain drive
- Suspension: Front:
- Brakes: Front: Double disc 308 mm Rear: Disc 220 mm
- Tyres: Front: 120/70 R17 ZR; Rear: 180/55 R17 ZR
- Wheelbase: 1,390 mm (55 in)
- Dimensions: L: 2,050 mm (81 in); W: 660 mm (26 in); H: 1,135 mm (44.7 in)
- Seat height: 815 mm (32.1 in)
- Weight: 165 kg (364 lb) (dry)
- Fuel capacity: 18.0 litres (4.0 imp gal; 4.8 US gal)
- Related: Triumph Daytona 955i

The Triumph Daytona 600 is a name given to two different motorcycles.

The first model was sport bike manufactured in 1983 by Triumph Motorcycles out of their Meriden factory that was claimed to do over 100 miles per hour but fell within a lower insurance price bracket than the preceding 650cc Triumph TR65 Thunderbird in order to attract younger buyers. Although simply a shorter-stroked, twin-carburettored version of their earlier 650 cc Triumph TR65 Thunderbird but with an 8.5:1 compression ratio, it was exhibited as a new model for their 1983 range at the 1982 motorcycle show at the National Exhibition Centre. Unique for that year's home market models, it featured rear set foot rests and a plastic 'ducktail' rear end over the short chromed rear mudguard from the Triumph T140 TSX. Although, sporting a front disc brake, the model retained the drum rear brake of the TR65 Thunderbird.

Two prototypes were made, one electric start version for the press and shows, the other a kick start version for factory road-testing; the latter, the only one left after the Meriden factory closed in 1983, was, from 2010, displayed at the London Motorcycle Museum.

The new Triumph company based at Hinckley, which was started after the original Triumph company went into administration, has made a far better known and more numerous Daytona 600. It is powered by a liquid-cooled 599 cc (36.6 cu in) four-cylinder in-line engine and was superseded by the Daytona 650 from 2005.

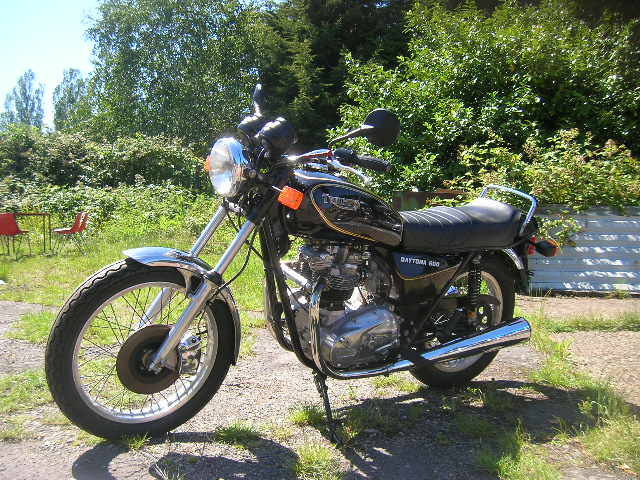
1983 prototype 600cc Daytona made by Triumph's Meriden factory now on display at the London Motorcycle Museum

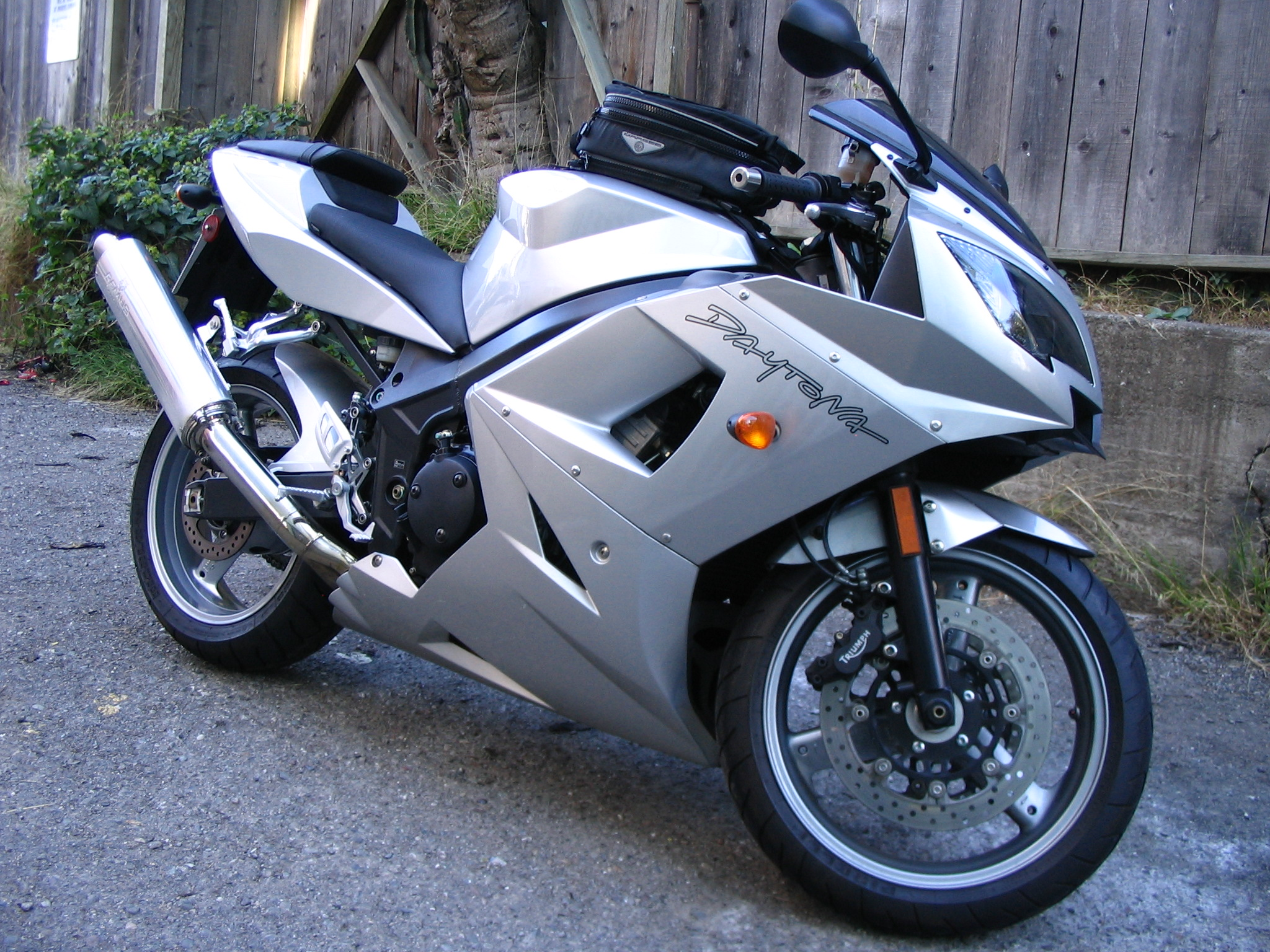
Triumph 600 Daytona

== See also ==
- Triumph Tiger Daytona
