= Triumph TT600 =

British motorcycle

Triumph TT 600
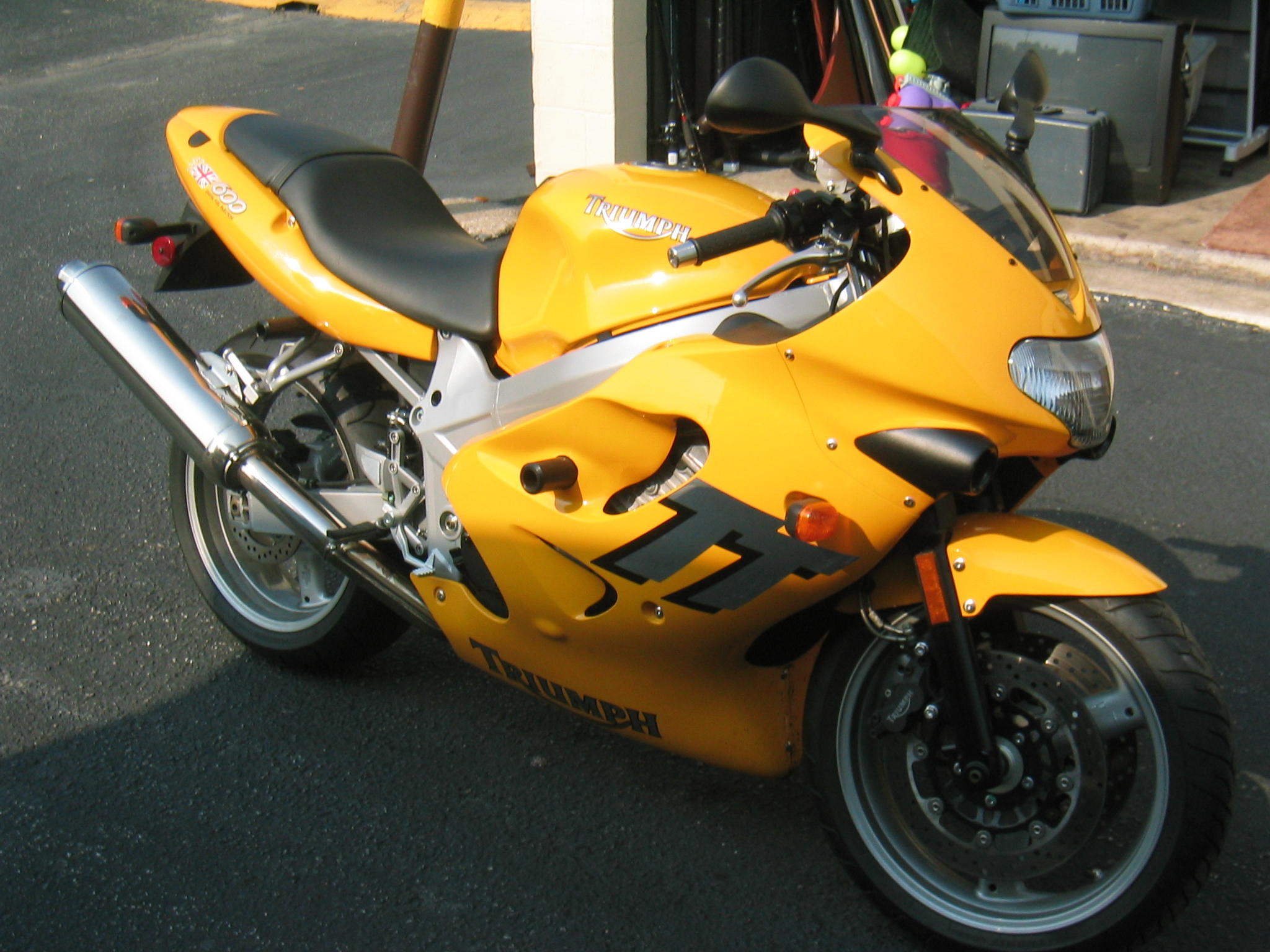
- Manufacturer: Triumph
- Production: 2000–2003
- Successor: Daytona 600
- Class: Sport bike
- Engine: 599 cc (36.6 cu in), liquid-cooled, DOHC, inline-4
- Bore / stroke: 68 mm × 41.3 mm (2.68 in × 1.63 in)
- Compression ratio: 12.5:1
- Power: 110PS (108bhp)@ 12,750 rpm
- Torque: 68Nm (50.5ft-lbf) @ 11,000 rpm
- Transmission: 6 speed, chain drive
- Suspension: Front: 43mm cartridge forks with dual rate springs and adjustable preload, compression and rebound damping Rear: Monoshock with adjustable preload, rebound and compression damping
- Brakes: Front: Twin 310mm floating discs, 4 piston calipers Rear: Single 220mm disc, single piston caliper
- Tyres: Front: 120/70 ZR 17; Rear: 180/55 ZR 17
- Rake, trail: 24°, 89.1mm
- Wheelbase: 1395mm (54.9in)
- Dimensions: L: 2060mm (81.1in); W: 665mm (26.2in); H: 1150mm (45.3in)
- Seat height: 810mm (31.9in)
- Weight: 170kg (374 lb) (dry); 188kg (413.6 lb) (wet)
- Fuel capacity: 18 liter (4.8 gal)

The Triumph TT 600 is a middleweight sport bike built by Triumph.

== History and development ==
Shortly after Triumph returned to the American market, the designers set their sights on entering the highly contested 600cc market. The Triumph TT600 was designed in 1996, and produced between the year 2000 and 2003. It was Triumph Motorcycles' first in-line four-cylinder 600 cc sportbike, designed to compete in the world's most competitive motorcycle class, the fuel-injected middleweight category.

== Reception ==
With a lightweight frame and chassis (dry weight of only 170 kg), adjustable Kayaba shocks, the TT600's handling and braking were highly praised across the industry for being well-balanced and agile. The standard adjustable suspension tuning, combined with a plush seat, upright position, and high-mounted handlebars gave the TT600 remarkable feel and a high degree of comfort similar to its competitors.

Unfortunately, the TT600 was marred by two major issues. Being the company's first fuel-injected 600cc sportbike, the initial 2000 model had choppy throttle response and bad fuel mapping, leading to harsh on/off throttle transitions. These issues were fixed with the 2001 model, but some vehicles ended up losing 2-3 horsepower in the upper portion of the powerband. The introduction of the 2002 model added back that small amount of horsepower with still more ECU reprogramming, ensuring that the TT600 was now up to the task of producing enough horsepower to adequately compete with its competition. The TT600's successor was the 2003 Triumph Daytona.

== See also ==
Triumph Daytona 600
