= Triumph Daytona 955i =

British motorcycle

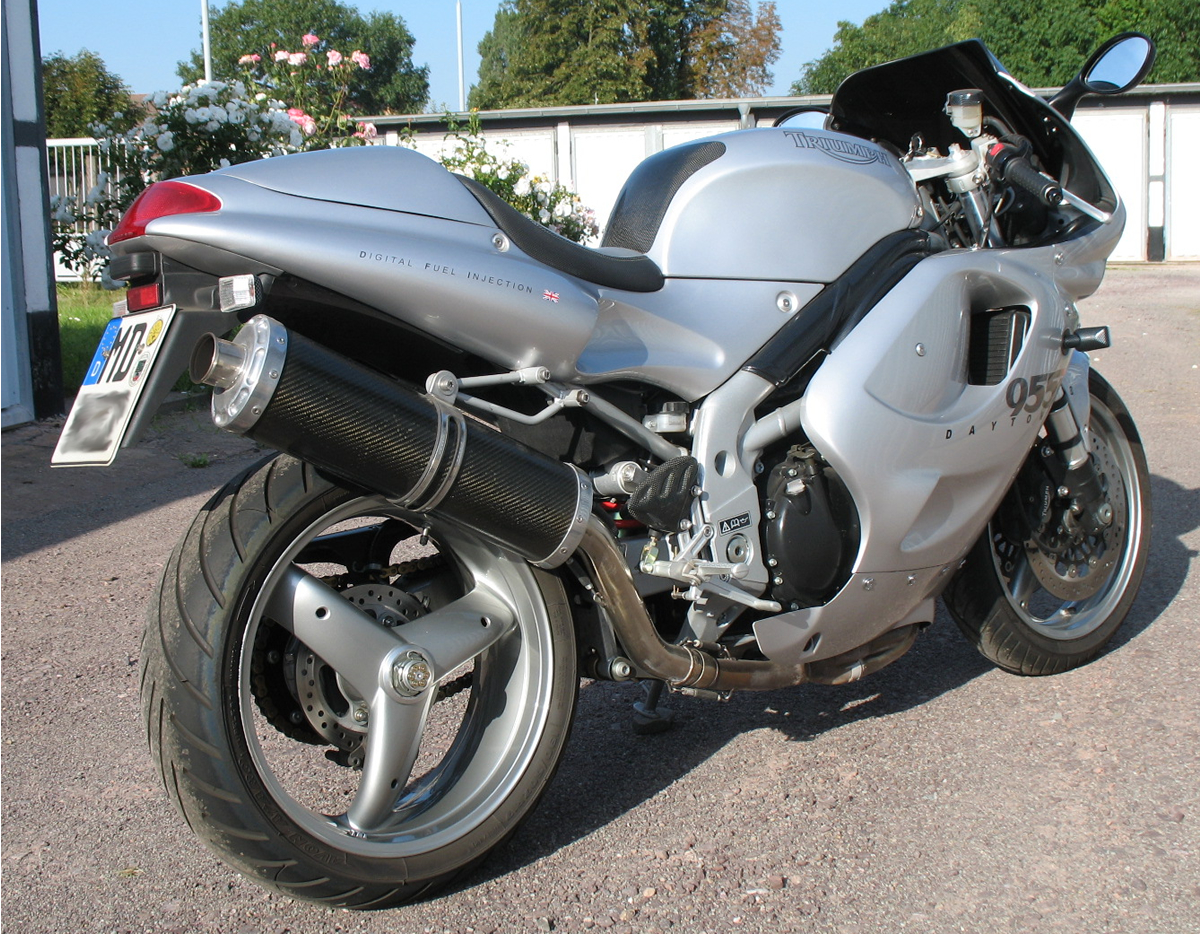
- Manufacturer: Triumph
- Also called: Triumph T595 Daytona (1997–1998)
- Production: 1997–2006
- Class: Sport bike
- Engine: 955 cc (58.3 cu in) 4-stroke, inline-3 4 valve per cylinder DOHC, liquid-cooled
- Bore / stroke: 79.0 mm × 65.0 mm (3.11 in × 2.56 in) Compression ratio: 12.0:1
- Top speed: 161 mph (259 km/h)
- Power: 128 hp (95 kW) (rear wheel)@ 10,500 rpm
- Torque: 66.0 lb⋅ft (89.5 N⋅m) (rear wheel))@ 8,500 rpm
- Transmission: 6 gears
- Frame type: Cast aluminium
- Suspension: Front: 45 mm (1.8 in) forks with dual rate springs and adjustable preload, compression and rebound damping Rear: Monoshock with adjustable preload, rebound and compression damping
- Brakes: Front: Double disc. 320 mm (13 in) Nissin 4-piston callipers. Rear: Single disc. 2-piston callipers. 220 mm (8.7 in)
- Tyres: Front: 120 / 70 ZR 17, Rear: 190 / 50 ZR 17
- Wheelbase: 1,426 mm (56.1 in)
- Dimensions: L: 2,112 mm (83.1 in); W: 725 mm (28.5 in); H: 1,165 mm (45.9 in)
- Seat height: 815 mm (32.1 in)
- Weight: 219.08 kg (483.0 lb) (wet)
- Fuel capacity: 21 L (4.6 imp gal; 5.5 US gal)
- Related: Triumph Daytona 600; Triumph Speed Triple; Triumph Daytona 675

The Triumph Daytona 955i is a sport bike manufactured by Triumph from 1997 to 2006. It is powered by a 955 cc (58.3 cu in) liquid cooled, inline three cylinder, four stroke engine. The bike was launched in 1997 as the Triumph T595 Daytona and renamed Triumph Daytona 955i in 1999.

== History ==
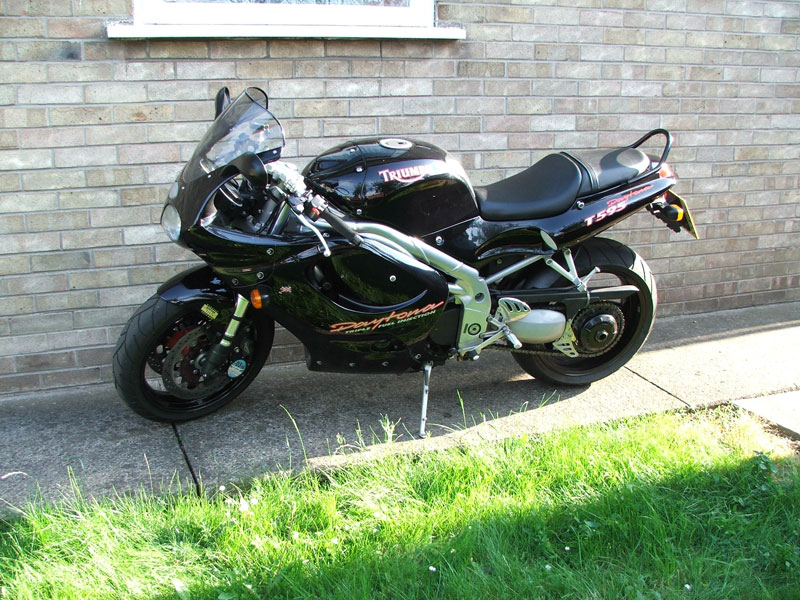
Triumph T595 Daytona

The Triumph Daytona T595 was introduced in 1997 in an attempt by Triumph to tap into the sports bike market. Despite the T595 name, the bike featured a 955 cc displacement in-line three-cylinder engine designed in part by Lotus. Along with the other triple-cylinder Triumphs, the Daytona helped to establish the newly managed manufacturer and its distinctive and unique three-cylinder motorcycles.

The T595-model name concatenated the new engine series "T5" and the first two numbers of the "955 cc" displacement. In 1998 the exhaust cam was advanced 5°.

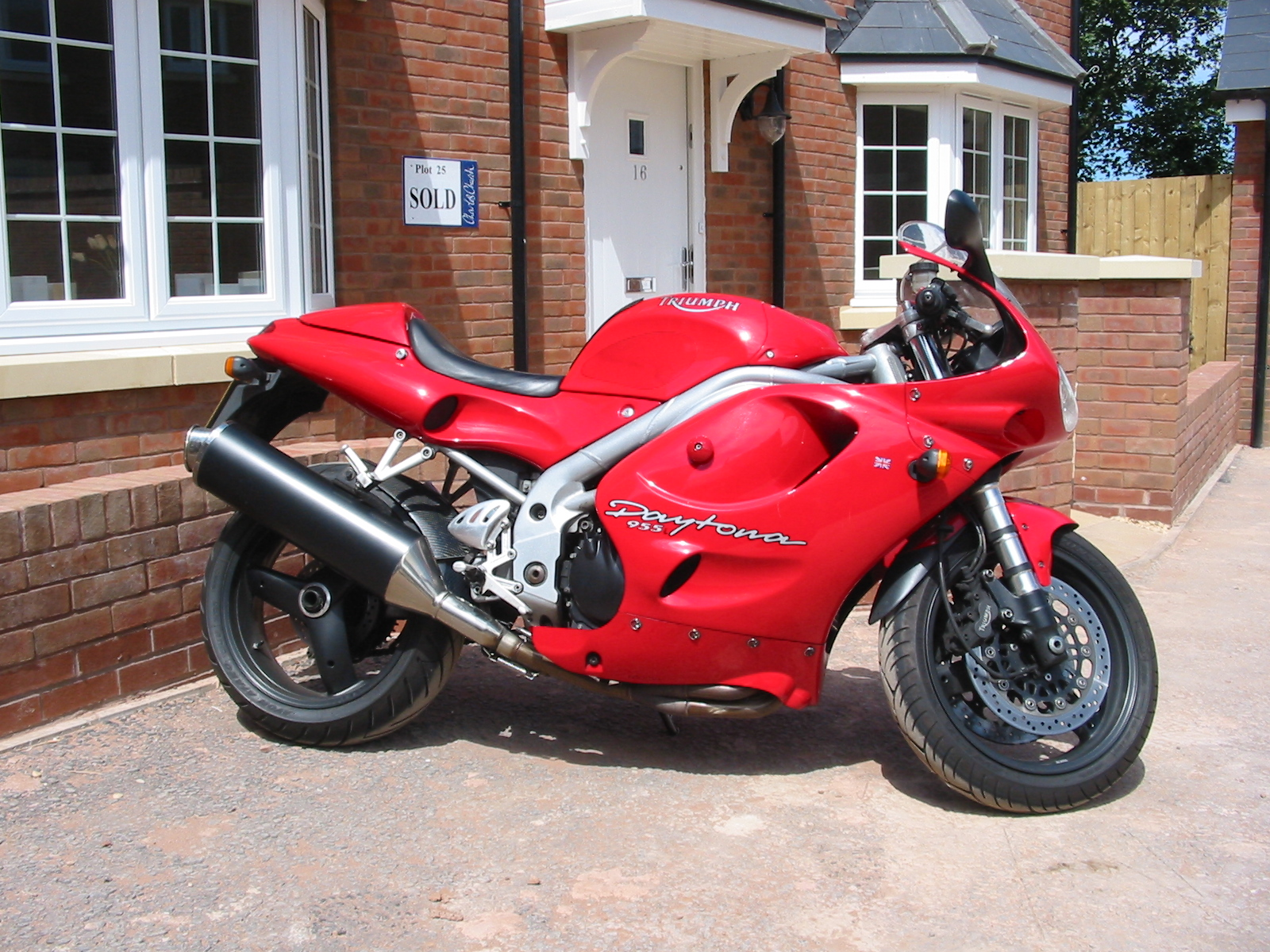
1999 Daytona 955i

In 1999 the bike received an update with new throttle bodies, injectors, fuel rail. The bike was renamed 955i because the T595 model name gave the impression that the bike's engine displaced 595 cc.

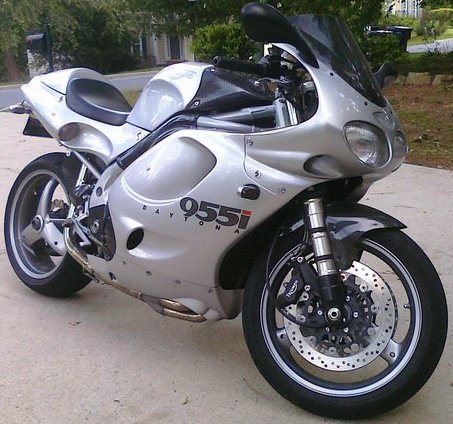
2000 Daytona 955

The 2000+ 955i version had a more compact and advanced Sagem MC1000 electronic engine management system (2-plug) instead of the original Sagem MC2000 controller (1-plug)

Large-scale changes were made in 2001 for the 2002 model, with a complete restyling of the bodywork by designer Gareth Davies, a newly designed engine raising the horsepower to 149 with internal performance upgrades included Forged steel crankshaft, forged steel connecting rods, and forged aluminium pistons. Focussed on reducing weight and better handling, the 2001 955i used a more common double-sided swing arm (DSSA) as opposed to the single-sided swing arm (SSSA) of the previous Daytonas. The DSSA version weighs 7.5 pounds (3.4 kg) less than the SSSA due to the lighter weight swing arm, and it is argued that the DSSA version handles better than the SSSA as it has less flex in the swing arm.

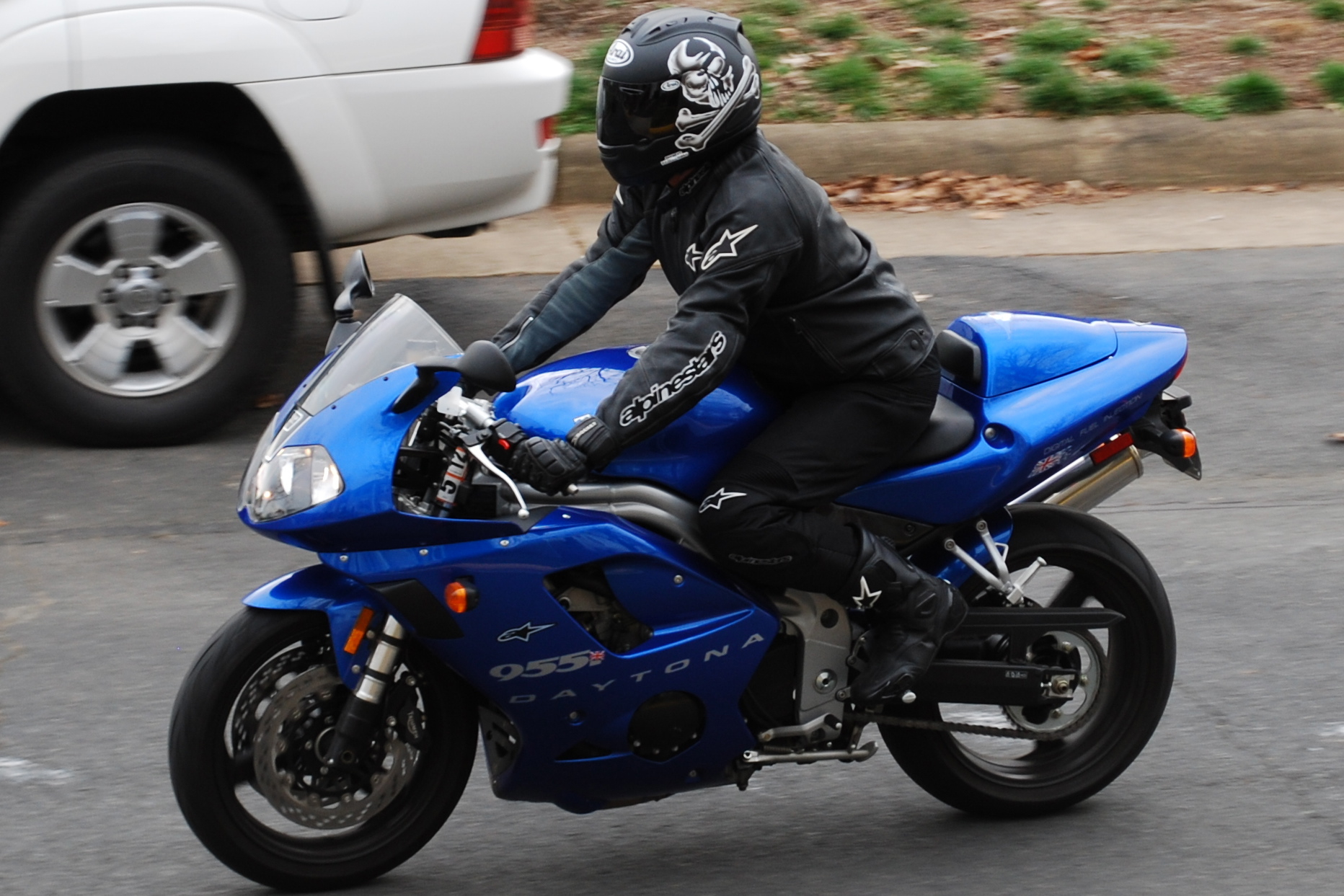
2002 Daytona 955i Caspian Blue

In 2002, a limited-production Centennial Edition (CE) Daytona 955i was offered. The 955i CE had several noteworthy additions to and differences from the non-CE '02 DSSA Daytona 955i:

- One colour option of Aston (British Racing) Green, which was offered only on the 2002 955i Centennial Edition.
- Carbon fibre infill panels between the fuel tank and tail fairing.
- Carbon fibre infill panels between the fuel tank and front fairing.
- Single-sided swing arm (like the previous and later Daytona 955i).

In 2002 a limited-production Special Edition (SE) Daytona 955i was offered. The 955i SE model similar to the CE, except with red body work and the deletion of the centennial logos.

In 2004, some minor changes were made including the deletion of the Union Jack logos.

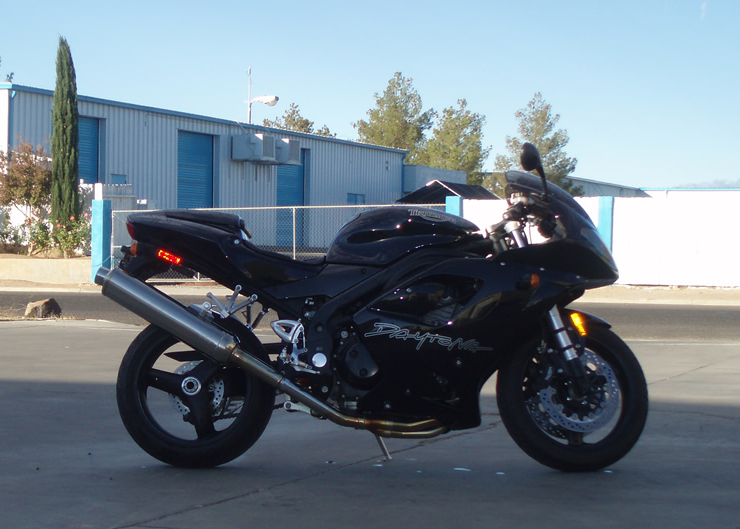
2005 Daytona 955i

In 2005 the bodywork was revised to include a horizontally-split headlamp, a more streamlined upper fairing, and a reduced tail 'hump'. The frame was also painted black instead of the silver of all previous models. The fuel-injection system was changed from a bypass-regulated-rail to a returnless-rail system.

== Specifications ==
| | 1999–2000 | 2001–2006 |
Engine
| Type | Liquid Cooled, In-Line 3-Cylinder | |
| Capacity | 955 cc (58.3 cu in) | |
| Bore/Stroke | 79.0 mm × 65.0 mm (3.11 in × 2.56 in) | |
| Compression Ratio | 11.2:1 | 12.0:1 |
| Fuel System | Sequential multipoint electronic fuel injection. DOHC | |
| Ignition | CDI via electronic engine management system | |
Transmission
| Primary Drive | Gear | |
| Final Drive | X-ring Chain | O-ring Chain |
| Clutch | Wet, multi-plate | |
| Gearbox | 6 speed | |
Cycle Parts
| Frame | Fabricated cast aluminium alloy perimeter | |
| Swingarm | Single-sided, aluminium alloy with eccentric chain adjuster | |
| Front Wheel | | Alloy 3-spoke, 17 in × 3.5 in (432 mm × 89 mm) |
| Rear Wheel | | Alloy 3-spoke, 17 in × 6.0 in (430 mm × 150 mm) |
| Front Tire | 120/70-ZR17 | |
| Rear Tire | 190/50-ZR17 (180 from 2001) | |
| Front Suspension | 45 mm conventional forks with dual rate springs and adjustable preload, compression and rebound damping | |
| Rear Suspension | Monoshock with adjustable preload, rebound and compression damping | |
| Front Brakes | Double disc. 4-piston callipers. 320 mm (12.6 in) | |
| Rear Brakes | Single disc. 2-piston callipers. 220 mm (8.7 in) diameter. | |
Dimensions
| Length | 2,115 mm (83.3 in) | 2,112 mm (83.1 in) |
| Width | 720 mm (28.3 in) | 725 mm (28.5 in) |
| Height | 1,170 mm (46.1 in) | 1,165 mm (45.9 in) |
| Seat Height | 800 mm (31.5 in) | 815 mm (32.1 in) |
| Wheelbase | 1,431 mm (56.3 in) | 1,426 mm (56.1 in) |
| Rake/Trail | 24 / 86 mm | 22.8°, 3.2 in (81 mm) |
| Fuel Tank Capacity | 18 litres (4.0 imp gal; 4.8 US gal) | 21 litres (4.6 imp gal; 5.5 US gal) |
