= Acetylmethionine sulfoxide reductase =

Acetylmethionine sulfoxide reductase may refer to either:

- Methionine-S-oxide reductase
- L-methionine (S)-S-oxide reductase
