= L-methionine:oxidized-thioredoxin S-oxidoreductase =

L-methionine:oxidized-thioredoxin S-oxidoreductase may refer to:

- Methionine-S-oxide reductase
- L-methionine (S)-S-oxide reductase
