= Audi Performance and Racing =

American automotive engineering and motorsport company

APR, LLC.
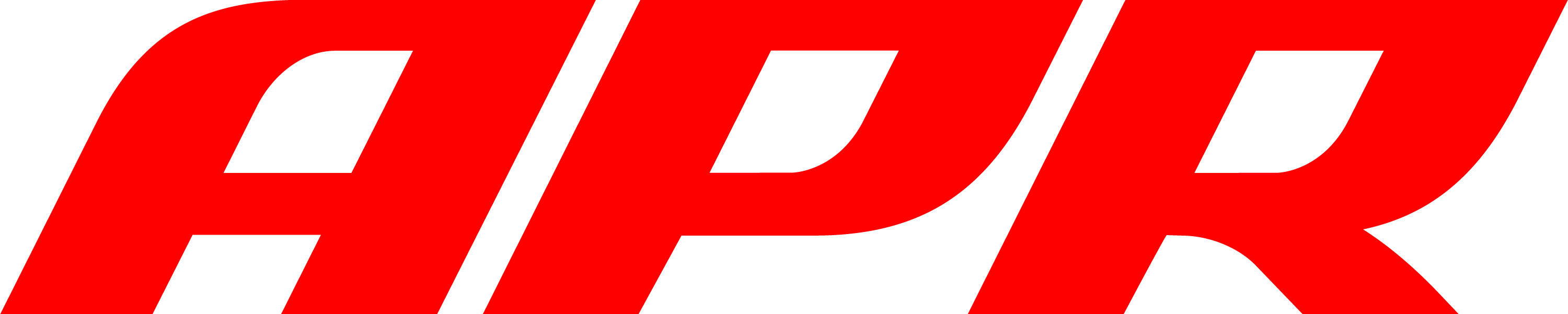
- Company type: Limited liability company
- Industry: Automotive engineering, motorsport
- Founded: 1997
- Headquarters: Opelika, Alabama, United States
- Area served: Worldwide
- Products: Engine tuning, automotive performance products
- Website: www.goapr.com

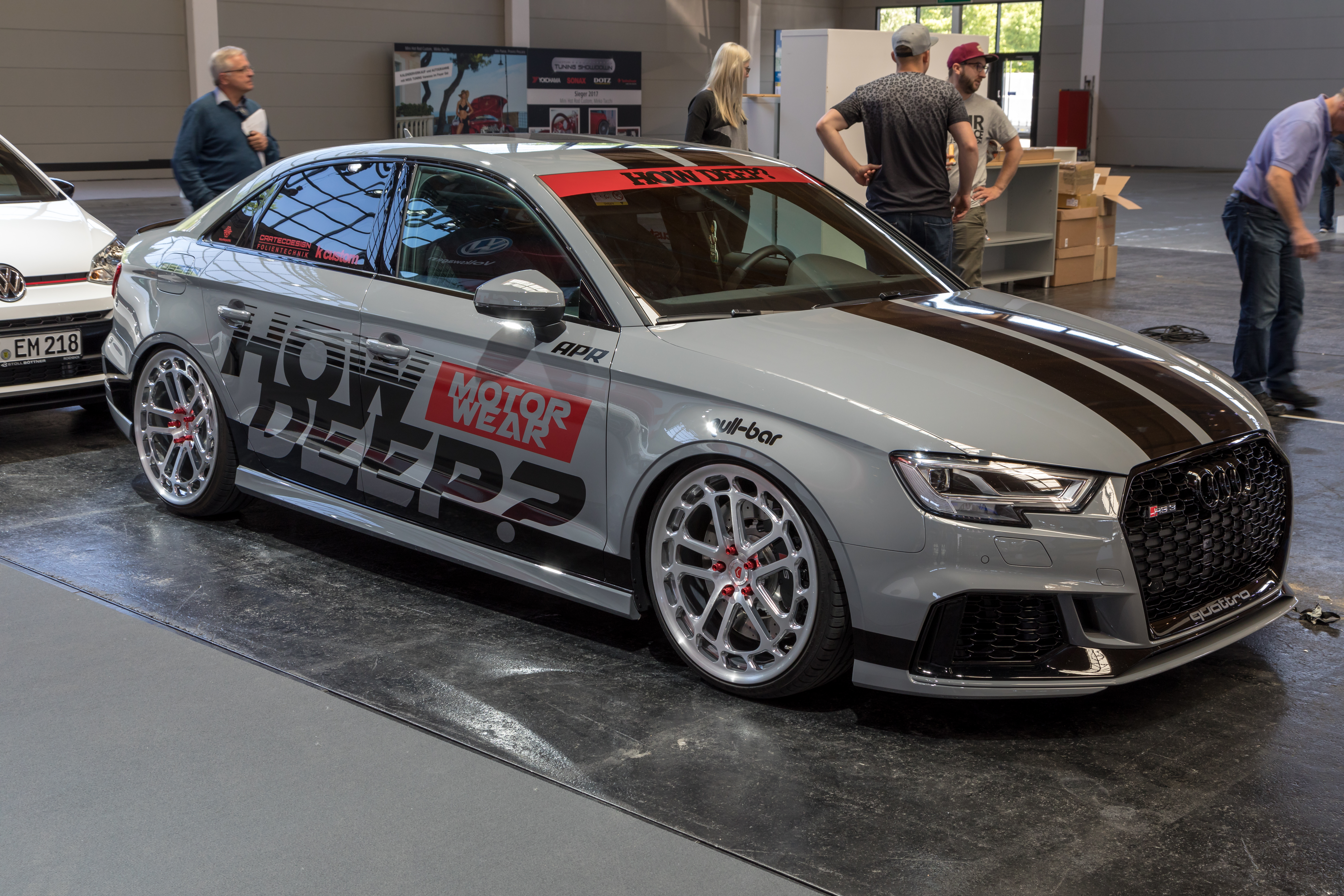
Audi RS3 sedan modified by APR

APR LLC is an American automotive engineering and motorsport company that offers aftermarket performance products for cars built by the Volkswagen Group, including Audi, Porsche, SEAT, Škoda and Volkswagen. Audi Performance & Racing was founded in 1997 by Brett Augsburger and Stephen Hooks, automotive engineers looking to offer aftermarket upgrades for Volkswagen Auto Group cars. Their first product was an ECU software upgrade for the 1997 Audi A4 1.8T, but the company soon expanded its product line to include exhaust and turbo systems. APR engine tuning products use proprietary software for reading and writing to Bosch Motronic engine control units.
