= Methionine sulfoxide reductase =

Methionine sulfoxide reductase may refer to:

- Methionine-S-oxide reductase
- L-methionine (S)-S-oxide reductase

== See also ==
- Peptide methionine sulfoxide reductase
