= Tunnel running =

Recreational driving through tunnels

Tunnel running is a kind of motor vehicle road rally for owners of high-performance vehicles. It emphasizes recreational driving in a group and journeys involving tunnels in particular, focusing on the enjoyment of the noises engines make in enclosed spaces rather than outright speed, and is a rare activity among sports car clubs. It is often at night when little other traffic is present. Similar to flash mobs, tunnel runs tend to be organized in a clandestine manner, although some groups do inform police about 'runs' beforehand.

The activity originated in 2004 in the United Kingdom. The original group, known as London Tunnel Runners, has facilitated regular tunnel runs since their founding in 2004. At times, convoys of over 200 cars have driven through tunnels in this manner.

== Background and history ==
Tunnel running, or "tunneling", originated as a social activity amongst TVR enthusiasts in 2004. Some sources state it was originated by Eddie Wharram, others that it started with a group of six enthusiasts. Autocar states that six people "turned up" following a suggestion. Eddie Wharram stated in an interview that the initial motive was simply the "unbelievable" noise caused by echoes of a large-displacement engine within the confines of a tunnel. Tunnel running has since evolved into a much larger membership where runs are organised in a democratic manner with no overall leaders. Unwritten rules have been created whereby participation and mutual appreciation of others' cars are the aim instead of any perceived competition.

Semi-regular meetings have since followed, often at night or pre-dawn to avoid congestion and gatecrashing by people who may not care for the safety of others. Runs could comprise more than 200 cars. Late-night start times allowed participants unfamiliar with London geography to follow in convoy. Since forming, The London Tunnel Runners have visited areas such as Wales, the south coast of England and as far as Paris.

Route and logistical information is often provided by the organisers, themselves enthusiasts. Due to the size and nature of the group, traffic jams have been known to occur due to passers-by trying to take photographs. Police attended to a minor traffic jam on the Paris run near the Eiffel Tower as pictures were taken by locals, whose actions were for the most part limited to curiosity and chatting with participants.

Since November 2007, Missbanzai, a Japanese sports car club, has organised tunnel runs through central London for Japanese car enthusiasts. These events have had up to 450 modified Japanese cars in attendance, from Nissan Skylines to Honda Preludes, and have raised over £15,000 for charities.

== Organization ==
=== Vehicles ===
While it is not a requirement to have a particular type of car in order to attend, due to the nature of the groups, an attendee's car tends to be one of the following:

- a recognized high-performance vehicle
- a recognized classic vehicle
- a vehicle considered to be unique enough to attract interest
- a performance version of a standard car (e.g. Golf R32, BMW M3)

=== Membership ===
The criteria for membership to the London Tunnel Runners is stated by the organizers to be one of maturity, respect for others and their property. The runs are organized within a restricted Internet forum to prevent them from being gatecrashed by unwanted parties, who may not have the same core beliefs, and bring the London Tunnel Run into disrepute.

=== International aspects ===
There are a number of international members who drive to the UK so they can join the runs. From 2007 onwards, a group of Dutch members have participated in tunnel runs on more than one occasion. They will usually arrive early on a Saturday morning to be met by a number of the UK Tunnel Runners where they may go to an event before the tunnel run.

=== Safety issues ===
The original group maintains active relations with the Metropolitan Police Service to make sure that inconvenience to the general public is kept to a minimum. Many other groups have been founded since tunnel running has become more popular, as a result of this, some groups who do not maintain the same respect for the law have caused negative feelings towards tunnel runners. To combat this, the London Tunnel Runners liaise with the police before every run, to enable the police to deal with genuine complaints that may be made towards the group, such as the complaint from Islington London Borough Council.

== Complaints and criticisms ==
"Modified cars racing through east London's tunnels are endangering motorists and making life a misery for residents," stated Poplar and Limehouse Member of Parliament Jim Fitzpatrick. "Up to 400 cars are congregating in Dartford and Essex and racing along a route which covers the Blackwall Tunnel and the Limehouse Link." The Labour MP, who has written to Tower Hamlets Police and the council demanding action on the organised events, also said the cars are using the tunnels at Westferry Circus to regroup and film stunts. He pointed out a YouTube video from 20 October 2012 which saw an estimated 265 Japanese fast cars gather in the roads under the Canary Wharf estate.

These cars use the tunnels and the route for no other purpose than to showcase the sound and speed of their cars. Videos posted online show dangerous and loud street car racing which belongs in a Hollywood movie and not the streets of east London. As well as causing a disturbance to residents the fast cars endanger motorists on the road. We need these tunnels runs off the road which means a dispersal zone and barriers on race nights.

— MP Jim Fitzpatrick

The MP, who has received numerous complaints from constituents, sent a Twitter message following the 20 October meet which read: "@MissBanzai Well, another #TunnelRun draws to a close. 3hrs from Start to Finish for most, 10 Tunnels, 265 Jap Motors woke up #London, one more time."

In late 2006, complaints by Islington London Borough Council led to contact from the police. This was caused by tunnel runners who had developed a predilection for the underpasses under the Barbican Estate, which are wide and spacious, allowing multiple cars in the tunnels at once. The complaint centered on the problem that they are above ground and act as underpasses for a 2000-apartment central-London housing estate, meaning the noise would reverberate through the apartment block. This combined with the time of the runs caused some tenants to complain.

The council named the problem group as the "London Tunnelers", in doing so, they described them as a "clandestine group of sports car enthusiasts" and stated that they were "quite notorious in certain circles" due to their choice of location and activity. The police stated that "It seems the idea [of the runs] is to make as much noise as possible, using high-powered sports cars. But there have been no allegations of speeding or dangerous driving."

=== Current status ===
Tunnel Runs ceased around 2018, with members dropping off and runs not being organised. The ever increasing network of safety cameras in London, many of them average speed, has rendered this pastime one that many now consider too risky for their licence.

== London tunnel runs in the media ==
The programme Vroom Vroom aired on mainstream satellite channel Sky One carried a report on the tunnel run where presenter Emma Parker Bowles was invited to join the run. Throughout the event, the presenter changed between cars experiencing the many different aspects of a run.

A video of a tunnel run has also been made by a tunnel runner so people can appreciate the experience.

Channel 4's 4car website produced an article detailing a tunnel run event with a gallery of photos.

Redline Magazine produced an article on London Tunnel Runners in December 2007.
