= Lenovo P2 =

Android-based smartphone

- Brand: Lenovo
- Manufacturers: Flextronics Technologies Pvt Ltd. (India), Motorola Mobility (China)
- Type: Smartphone
- Series: Lenovo P Series
- First released: November 2016
- Predecessor: Lenovo Vibe P1
- Compatible networks: LTE, VoLTE, HSPA, GSM, EDGE, GPRS, 4G, 3G, 2G
- Dimensions: 153×76×8.3 mm (6.02×2.99×0.33 in) (L * WxT)
- Weight: 177 g (6 oz) (0.39 lbs)
- Operating system: Android 6.0.1, Android 7.0
- System-on-chip: Qualcomm Snapdragon 625 MSM8953
- CPU: Octa-core 2.0 GHz ARM Cortex-A53
- GPU: Adreno 506 at 550MHz
- Memory: 3GB or 4GB DDR3 Ram
- Storage: 32GB or 64 GB expandable via 128 GB microSD card
- Battery: 5100 mah non-removable with 24 Watt Rapid Charging
- Rear camera: 13 MP, Sony IMX 258 sensor, f/2.0 aperture PDAF, Dual-tone LED flash, Geo-tagging, Touch Focus, Face Detection, HDR, Panorama
- Front camera: 5 MP fixed-focus, f/2.2
- Display: 5.5" inch Full HD Super AMOLED Display with Gorilla Glass 3 1080 x 1920 pixels, 16:9 ratio (~401 ppi density)
- Sound: Bottom-ported single speaker, 2-Mics
- Connectivity: Micro USB, 3.5 mm headset jack, NFC
- Website: Lenovo India

Lenovo P2 is an Android-based smartphone that is focused on battery life, developed by Lenovo. It was officially announced on September 3, 2016 at IFA show held in Berlin and released in November 2016, as a successor to the Lenovo Vibe P1. The device is available in Graphite Grey and Champagne Gold colour variants. It was, at the time of its release, one of the few devices which had a 5000+ mAh battery.

== Specifications ==
Lenovo P2 and Its Box

The device is said to have "a super slim full-metal unibody design". In terms of specifications, the device sports a 5.5-inch full HD Super Amoled display with a 1920 × 1080 resolution and 401 ppi. It is powered by 14 nm 2 GHz 64-bit Octa-Core Qualcomm Snapdragon 625 MSM8953 processor paired with 3 GB or 4 GB RAM. The P2 includes an internal storage of 32 GB, which can be further expanded up to 128 GB via a microSD card. It has two nano SIM card slots. One slot is used for SIM, while the second slot is used as either SIM or SD Card.

The smartphone is equipped with a 13 MP PDAF rear camera with a Sony sensor and LED flash and a 5 MP front-facing camera for selfie. The device includes NFC, USB OTG, FM Radio, A-GPS, Bluetooth v4.1, Wi-Fi 802.11 a/b/g/n/ac and WiFi Hotspot for connectivity and the featured sensors are accelerometer, proximity sensor, ambient light sensor, compass, gyroscope, always active fingerprint scanner which also offers some gestures etc.

The Lenovo P2 was launched with Android 6.0.1 Marshmallow ROM, which was released a year before the P2 release. In April 2017, P2 officially received an update to Android 7.0 (Nougat), which was 2 GB in size and could be updated via OTA (over the air update). The update brought features such as split-screen, new notification control, data saver and other security updates. The latest android security patch level is November 1, 2017. Build number: P2a42_S251_171107_ROW.

The main point which makes the P2 stand out, is that it is powered by a 5100 mAh battery, one of the highest-capacity batteries in its class at the time for the price. It is claimed to give up to three days of usage, in a normal use case scenario. The device also has a physical power-saver switch, which extends the battery life. The P2 is also able to reverse-charge another device. The phone works with a 24 W quick charger that can rapidly charge the battery. Rapid charge function works when on charge with the screen off. It comes with some pre-installed apps such as Google Maps, Hangouts, Play Music, Play Movies, YouTube, Gmail, News & Weather, Photos, Drive, Chrome and Play store.

SAR values of this smartphone is

- 0.297 W/kg@1 g (head) and 0.896 W/kg@1 g (body).
