= Oppo Joy 3 =

Android smartphone from Oppo

- Brand: Oppo
- Series: Oppo Joy Series
- First released: August 2015
- Predecessor: Oppo Joy
- Successor: None
- Compatible networks: 2G bands: GSM(850/900/1800/1900); 3G bands: HSDPA(850/900/2100); HSPA
- Dimensions: 132.8x66.6x9 mm; 5.23x2.62x0.35 in
- Weight: 135 g (4.76 oz)
- Operating system: ColorOS 2 running on Android 4.4
- System-on-chip: MediaTek MT6582
- CPU: 4x1.3 GHz Cortex-A7
- GPU: Mali-400MP2, 2 cores, 500MHz
- Memory: 1GB single channel, 533MHz
- Storage: 4GB
- Removable storage: microSDHC
- Battery: Removable Li-Po, 2000mAh
- Charging: microUSB 2.0
- Rear camera: Sensor: CMOS; Resolution: 2592x1944 (5.04MP); Aperture: f/2.4; Video: 720p at 30fps
- Front camera: Resolution: 1600x1200 (1.92MP); Aperture: f/2.4; Video: 480p at 30fps
- Display: Type: IPS LCD; Size: 4.5 inches, 55.8 cm^2; Resolution: 480x854, 218 ppi; Ratios: 16:9 aspect ratio, 63.1% StB ratio
- Sound: Loudspeaker: Yes; 3.5mm jack: Yes
- Media: Audio: AAC, AMR / AMR-NB / GSM-AMR, MIDI, MP3, WMA, WAV; Video: 3GPP, AVI, H.263, H.264 / MPEG-4 Part 10 / AVC video, MP4, WMV, Xvid
- Connectivity: Wi-Fi 802.11 b/g/n, hotspot; Bluetooth 4.0, A2DP, EDR; A-GPS; FM radio; microUSB 2.0, USB On-The-Go
- Data inputs: Accelerometer; Proximity sensor
- Model: A11w
- Development status: Discontinued
- SAR: US: 0.39 W/kg (head), 1.166 W/kg (body)
- Other: Colors: White, Gray; Price: About 130 EUR
- Website: https://www.oppo.com/en/smartphone-joy-3/

The Oppo Joy 3 is the second, and last, phone in the Oppo Joy series. It launched in August 2015. All phones in the series have the slogan "Leap Up, Reach Joy." Compared to the Oppo Joy Plus, the phone has 2 extra CPU cores, totaling four over the past generations' two. The phone also featured a better GPU, a bigger screen, and a slightly bigger chassis but improved screen-to-body ratio. The phone launched with a price of about €130 and two color options: White, and Gray.

== Details ==
The Oppo Joy 3 is an Android Smartphone launched in August 2015. It features a 4.5 inch, capacitive, IPS LCD with the resolution of 480 by 854 with a pixel density of 218 PPI. The processor is a Mediatek MT6582 SoC (System-on-chip), with 1 gigabyte of single channel, 533 MHz memory, and 4 gigabytes of internal storage, with a microSDHC slot for removable storage. It uses ColorOS 2 (running on Android 4.4).
