= Lenovo Vibe P1 =

Android smartphone

- Manufacturer: Lenovo
- Type: Touchscreen smartphone
- Series: Lenovo Vibe Series
- First released: October 2015; 10 years ago
- Successor: Lenovo P2
- Related: Lenovo Vibe P1m
- Compatible networks: (GSM/GPRS/EDGE): 850, 900, 1,800 and 1,900 MHz; 3G (HSDPA 42.2 Mbit/s, HSUPA 5.76 Mbit/s): 850, 900, 1,900 and 2,100 MHz; LTE: 800, 850, 900, 1,800, 2,100 and 2,600 MHz
- Form factor: Slate
- Dimensions: 152.9 mm (6.02 in) H; 75.6 mm (2.98 in) W; 9.9 mm (0.39 in) D
- Weight: 189 g (6.7 oz)
- Operating system: Android 5.1 "Lollipop"
- System-on-chip: Qualcomm Snapdragon 615
- CPU: Quad-core 1.5 GHz Cortex-A53; Quad-core 1.1 GHz Cortex A-53
- GPU: Adreno 405, 550 MHz
- Memory: 2 GB RAM
- Storage: 16 GB
- Removable storage: microSD up to 128 GB
- Battery: 4900 mAh Li-ion
- Rear camera: 13 megapixel f/2.2, 1080p@30 frames per second (fps), phase detection autofocus, dual LED flash, Geo-tagging, touch focus, face detection, HDR, panorama
- Front camera: 5 MP
- Display: 5.5" 1080 x 1920 pixels resolution, 401 ppi Gorilla Glass 3, 16M colors
- Sound: Earpiece, loudspeaker
- Connectivity: List: Wi-Fi: 802.11 a/b/g/n/ac (2.4/5 GHz); Wi-Fi hotspot; GPS/GLONASS; NFC; Bluetooth 4.1 BLE; USB 3.0 (Micro-B port, USB charging) USB OTG; 3.50 mm (0.138 in) headphone jack
- Data inputs: List: Fingerprint recognition; Accelerometer; Gyroscope; Proximity sensor; Compass; Barometer; Magnetic sensor; RGB ambient light
- SAR: At the Head - 0.670 W/Kg, At the Body - 0.671 W/Kg
- Website: shopap.lenovo.com/in/en/smartphones/vibe/vibe-p1/

Lenovo Vibe P1 (stylized as Lenovo VIBE P1) is an Android smartphone manufactured by Lenovo. The Vibe P1 was announced on 2 September 2015 at IFA 2015. It was launched in October 2015 for US$249. It was available in Silver, Platinum and Graphite Grey and Gold (only available in China) colour variants.

== Specifications ==
The Vibe P1 sports a 5.5-inch Full HD IPS LCD with 1920 × 1080 pixels resolution and 401 ppi pixel density. It is powered by Qualcomm Snapdragon 615 SoC that has a 1.5 GHz 64-bit octa-core CPU and Adreno 405 GPU, and is paired with 2 GB RAM. It includes 32 GB of internal storage which can be further expanded up to 128 GB by using a microSD card. It is equipped with a 13 MP rear camera along with a 5 MP front-facing camera.

The Vibe P1 comes with a 5000 mAh battery, one of the highest-capacity batteries in its class at the time of release. In addition to a physical power saver switch which instantly extends battery life, the Vibe P1 comes with a 24 W quick charge function that can rapidly charge the phone battery. It also has a OTG (On-The-Go) charging feature that enables it to charge other devices.

In terms of connectivity, the device includes NFC, USB OTG, FM radio, A-GPS, Bluetooth 4.1, Wi-Fi 802.11 a/b/g/n/ac and Wi-Fi Hotspot. It also includes accelerometer, proximity sensor, and ambient light sensor. The Wi-Fi Boost feature provides 5G WiFi support for improved Wi-Fi speed and range. It can also be paired with a range of smart devices from headsets to cameras and TVs by utilizing wireless NFC technology. Meanwhile, an embedded fingerprint scanner on the home button supports black screen unlock.

The Vibe P1 measures 75.6 mm x 9.9 mm x 152.9 mm and weighs 189 grams. The phone is dual-SIM (nano size) enabled.

The Vibe P1 runs on Android 5.1 Lollipop operating system and Lenovo's user interface Vibe UI out of the box. It is upgradable to Android 6.0.1 Marshmallow.

== Vibe P1m ==
Lenovo also launched its Lenovo Vibe P1m smartphone along with the Vibe P1. The handset is the lite and the compact variant of the Vibe P1, and features a smaller display, different processor, and less RAM. It sports a 5-inch HD (720×1280 pixels) display, is powered by a 64-bit quad-core MediaTek MT6735 processor with 2 GB RAM, and 16 GB storage with expandable storage support.
