= Oppo Joy =

Android Smartphone from Oppo

- Brand: Oppo
- Series: Oppo Joy Series
- First released: May 2014; April 30, 2015 (Plus)
- Successor: Oppo Joy 3
- Compatible networks: 2G bands: GSM 850 / 900 / 1800 / 1900 - SIM 1 & SIM 2; 3G bands: HSDPA 2100; HSPA
- Dimensions: 124x63x9.9 mm; 4.88x2.48x0.39 in
- Weight: 125 g (4.41 oz)
- Operating system: ColorOS 1.0.2i running on Android 4.2.1; ColorOS 2 running on Android 4.4 (Plus)
- System-on-chip: MediaTek MT6572
- CPU: 2x1.3 GHz Cortex-A7
- GPU: Mali-400 MP1, 500MHz
- Memory: 512MB LPDDR2, 266MHz; 1GB LPDDR2, 266MHz (Plus)
- Storage: 4GB (1.3GB user available)
- Removable storage: microSDHC
- Battery: Removable Li-ion, 1700mAh
- Charging: microUSB 2.0
- Rear camera: 2048x1536 (3.15MP)
- Front camera: 640x480 (0.3MP)
- Display: Type: TFT; Size: 4.0 inches, 45.5 cm^2; Resolution: 480x800, 233 ppi; Ratios: 5:3 aspect ratio, 58.3% StB ratio
- Sound: Loudspeaker: Yes; 3.5mm jack: Yes
- Media: Audio: AAC, FLAC, MIDI, MP3, OGG, WMA, WAV, APE; Video: H.263, H.264 / MPEG-4 Part 10 / AVC video, MP4
- Connectivity: Wi-Fi 802.11 b/g/n, DLNA, hotspot; Bluetooth 4.0, A2DP; A-GPS; FM radio; microUSB 2.0
- Data inputs: Accelerometer; Proximity sensor
- Model: R1001
- SAR: US: 0.402 W/kg (head), 0.611 W/kg (body)
- Other: Colors: White, Black; Price: About 100 EUR
- Website: https://www.oppo.com/en/smartphone-joy-plus/

The Oppo Joy is the first in a short series of Oppo phones aimed at the budget segment of the smartphone market in India. These phones focused on delivering good battery life and cameras at the cost of other features.

== Oppo Joy Plus ==
The Oppo Joy Plus launched at the end of April, 2015. The phone had the slogan "Leap Up, Reach Joy." One of the phone's key selling points was an improved touchscreen which utilized an "all-new touch IC chip" which would allow users to user the device while wearing gloves or wet.

=== Hardware ===
The Oppo Joy Plus features a 4.0-inch IPS LCD (480 x 800 pixels). It is powered by a MediaTek MT6572 (28 nm) dual-core 1.3 GHz CPU, coupled with 1 GB of RAM and internal storage (expandable via microSD). For photography, it offers a 3.15 MP main camera and a VGA selfie camera. Power provided by a removable 1700 mAh Li-Ion battery.
