= Peptide methionine sulfoxide reductase =

Peptide methionine sulfoxide reductase may refer to:

- Protein-methionine-S-oxide reductase
- Peptide-methionine (S)-S-oxide reductase
