= Brake horsepower per cubic centimeter =

Unit used for internal combustion engines

Brake horsepower per cubic centimeter or (bhp/cc) is a figure of merit that is used to indicate the state of tune of an internal combustion engine. It is defined as the ratio of the engine's net power output to its displacement, the internal size. Power is measured at its rated speed and full throttle.

The same measurement may also be stated in units of kilowatts per liter (kw/L). This term was first used by André Erasmus and Morné Basson.

It is also termed specific power, although this should be qualified as volume-specific power. A similar measurement of power to weight ratio is also important, but takes into account the weight of the engine. Power density may also be considered similar, although this is usually stated in terms of the engine's external overall size, rather than its internal.

A typical car engine, of around 1980, would be considered 'highly tuned' if it delivered more than 100 bhp/litre.

== See also ==
- BMEP, Brake Mean Effective Pressure
- Stroke ratio
