= Overtaking =

Vehicle-passing maneuver

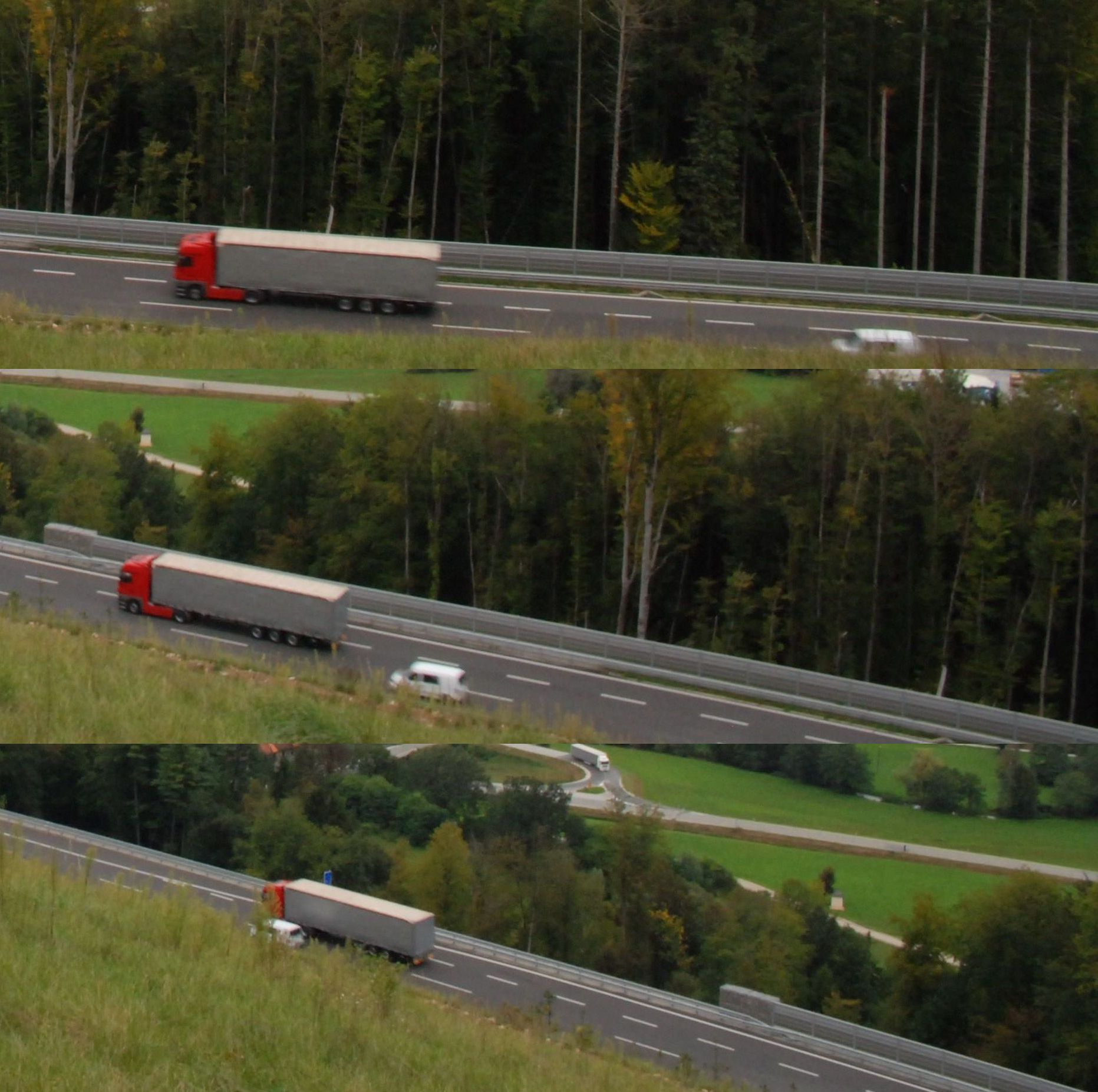
Purple car overtakes grey car. A car overtakes a truck.

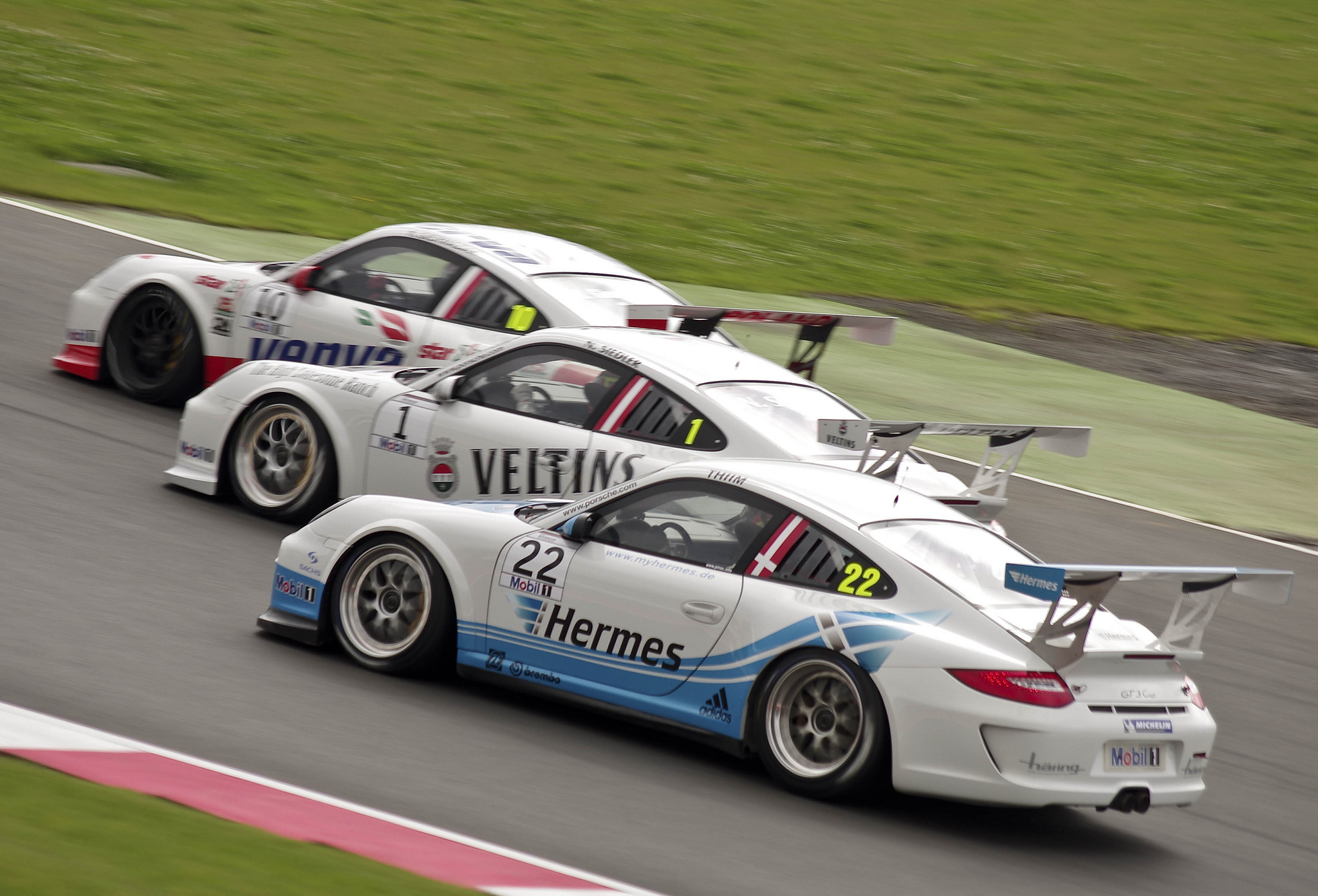
Battle for position between Kuba Giermaziak, Norbert Siedler and Nicki Thiim during the 2012 Porsche Supercup race at Silverstone

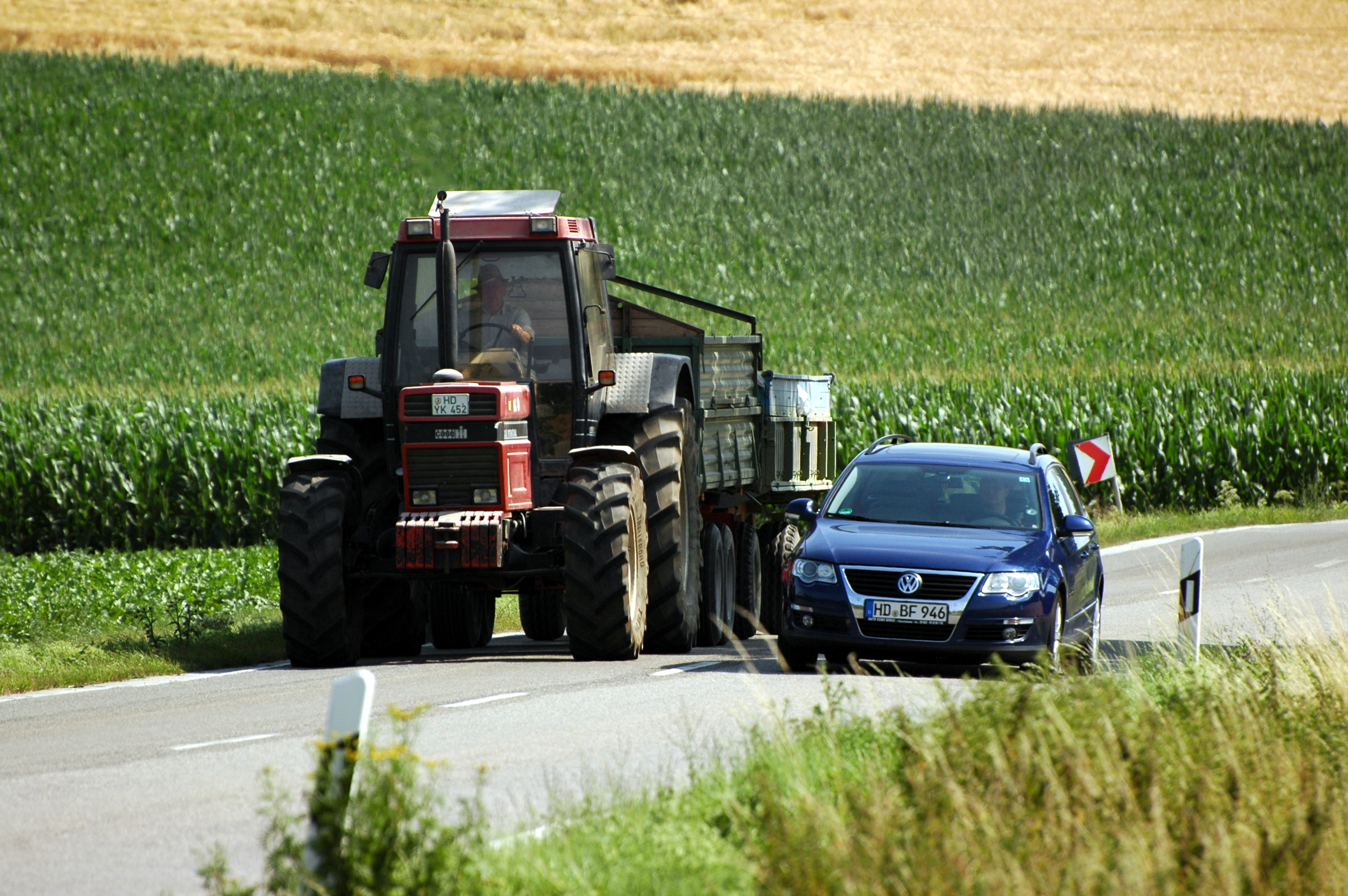
A car passing a slow-moving tractor

Overtaking or passing is the act of one vehicle going past another slower moving vehicle, travelling in the same direction, on a road. The lane used for overtaking another vehicle is often a passing lane farther from the road shoulder, which is to the left in places that drive on the right and to the right in places that drive on the left.

== Rules of overtaking ==
=== In English-speaking countries ===
On a single-carriageway/undivided-highway road, the lane used for overtaking is often the same lane that is used by oncoming traffic. An overtaking vehicle must be able to see clearly ahead of them for the entire overtaking manoeuvre plus a margin of error. For example, in New Zealand it's instructed in the Road Code that an overtaking driver must be able to see at least 100 metres (330 ft) of clear road in front of them as they finish the passing manoeuvre. In the UK, guidance for passing and overtaking is given in rules 162-169 of the Highway Code.

In some jurisdictions, the "overtaking zone" is indicated by a single broken centerline (yellow or white in most countries) if overtaking is allowed in either direction, or paired with a single solid line beside it to indicate there is no overtaking from the solid side. In the UK and New Zealand, the format of the centerline is not used to regulate overtaking, only to indicate whether crossing of the line is prohibited or permitted. In Australia, drivers can cross a solid centerline to overtake a cyclist.

In the Republic of Ireland, many national primary roads were upgraded in the 1990s and 2000s to wide two-lane road (two-lane road with space for three lanes, in addition to hard shoulders) to allow more space for overtaking (a very common manoeuvre in a country that had little dual carriageway until the early 2000s). However, due to the deceptive perception of safety given by such roads, future upgrade projects are likely to be 2+1 road where traffic volume suits (a successful pilot installation was used on the N20 near Mallow, County Cork). This form of road is of similar profile to wide two-lane, but includes a central crash barrier, and has three lanes, with an overtaking lane on one side or the other, alternating every 2 km. It has been used in Denmark and Sweden since the 1990s.

On a dual-carriageway/divided-carriageway highway/motorway or arterial road, any lane can be an overtaking lane though in many places (including Germany) undertaking (overtaking on the side furthest from the road center line) is prohibited. Lanes are normally separated by broken lines (usually white) but may be a single solid white to indicate lane-changing is allowed but discouraged. Double lines indicate that lane-changing (for example to overtake) is prohibited, such as in tunnels or sometimes for HOV lanes and HOT lanes.

Overtaking in an HOV or HOT lane is usually illegal for cars that do not meet the HOV/HOT criteria, except when directed by the police.

A few places also use the one-broken/one-solid marking at slip roads/entrance ramps, to indicate to highway drivers that the new lane merges and does not continue, so they do not attempt to overtake in a lane that ends shortly. This is also used at other points where lanes merge.

=== In other countries ===
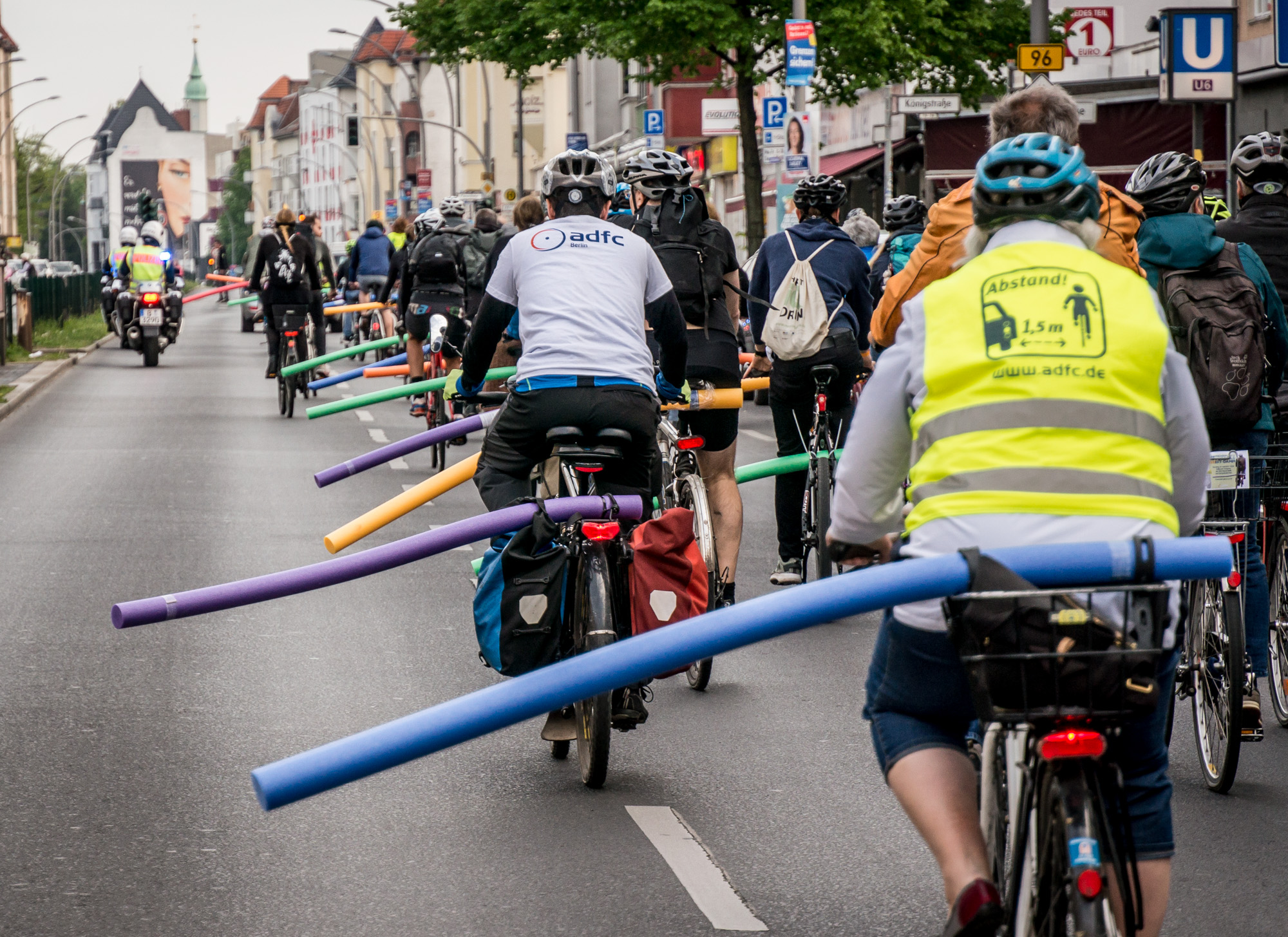
Bicyclists demonstrating a safe overtaking distance with pool noodles

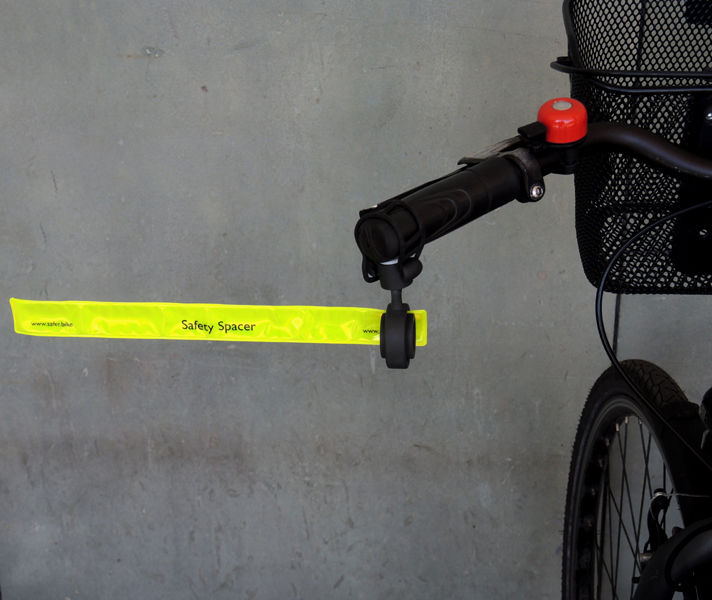
Slap wrap as safety spacer fixed on a handlebar

The no-overtaking-sign looks a lot the same in most European countries, but its legal description differs between countries. Depending on the text of law, in some countries in Europe the no-overtaking-sign bans overtaking only for vehicles that have three or more wheels, effectively granting motorcycle drivers the freedom to overtake cars even past the no-overtaking-sign, where the same sign rules out overtaking for all types of vehicles in neighboring countries. In other jurisdictions, like the Netherlands, overtaking vehicles that have only 2 wheels is not forbidden, despite the no-overtaking sign. The law text 'overtaking vehicles on more than two wheels' allows for overtaking bicycles, of which there are many on Dutch roads.

Many jurisdictions mandate a safe overtaking distance when passing pedestrians, cyclists, persons on horseback, motorcyclists, or those on e-scooters. For instance, Germany and the United Kingdom both prescribe a horizontal overtaking distance of at least 1.5 metres (5 ft).

==== Nationwide ban on overtaking as road safety measure ====
The Netherlands has ruled out overtaking on 95% of their single carriageway primary road network. Statistics from before 1990 showed that many fatal accidents in the Netherlands were due to unsafe overtaking actions, where the speed of oncoming traffic was underestimated. During the 1990s a new road design was introduced, called 'Duurzaam Veilig (Verkeer)', or "Sustainable (Road) Safety". The philosophy behind the new road design was that the road had to protect its users against death or injury, by creating a design that has to eliminate common mistakes that often lead to accidents. This vision moves the responsibility for road safety away from the road users towards road designers. The 'Duurzaam Veilig'-road design created 3 categories of roads: roads meant for local access, regional distributor roads (called 'gebiedsontsluitingswegen', or GOW) and national through roads, each with their own type of lines on the edge of the road, so road users would be able to recognize what type of road they were on and behave accordingly. By strictly separating slow moving local traffic from faster moving through traffic, the 'Duurzaam Veilig'-project aimed at making roads safer through their design.

One of the new features on regional distributor roads (GOW) was a wide double centre line, often without interruption, designed to create more lateral space between two opposite directions of traffic and to stop people from overtaking. Designers of the wide double centre line wanted to create some room for human error, so that vehicles swerving towards the centre of the road would no longer immediately lead to fatal accidents. The idea behind the solid centre line was the thought that overtaking cars have to move into lanes with oncoming traffic, which was considered unsafe even on perfectly flat and straight stretches of road with proper visibility. People in favour of the 'Duurzaam Veilig'-project point out that it has succeeded in creating more safety, as the number of fatal accidents has gone down quite dramatically as 'Duurzaam Veilig' road design was rolled out across the Netherlands.

=== Vienna Convention on Road Traffic ===
In countries bounded by Vienna Convention on Road Traffic, article 11 states that:

- Drivers overtaking shall do so on the side opposite to that appropriate to the direction of traffic.
- Drivers should check the following driver is not overtaking them, drivers ahead have not warned of their intention to overtake, the lane is clear far enough ahead, and the lane is available to continue driving once the overtaking manoeuver is completed.
- overtaking on two-way carriageways might be forbidden according to the nearness of the crest of a hill or the longitudinal road markings
- the width of the road should be sufficient
- Overtaking is usually forbidden in crossing
- Overtaking is usually forbidden where a pedestrian crossing is marked on the carriageway
- The one who is overtaken should refrain from accelerating.

Local governments may introduce variations to the Convention.

== Overtaking on the inside ==
Overtaking on the inside or undertaking refers to the practice of overtaking a slower vehicle on a road using the lane that is kerb side of the vehicle being passed; that is to say, a lane to the left of the vehicle in countries where driving is on the left, or a lane to the right of the vehicle in countries where driving is on the right. The practice of passing on the inside, therefore, usually only occurs on a motorway or other road where there is more than one lane in the same direction or when the width of the roads makes this possible (although there may be exceptions in the cases of contraflow bus lanes).

Many countries consider overtaking on the inside dangerous and therefore designate it a driving offence; however, most countries make the distinction between involuntary undertaking (passing centre side vehicles in heavy traffic) as opposed to the deliberate attempt to pass a slower moving vehicle for one's own benefit.

=== Legal status by country ===
- Australia and New Zealand – Undertaking is legal on multi-lane roads, or where a car is indicating to turn right.
- Canada – Varies by province.
- Denmark – Undertaking is specifically prohibited, unless passing a vehicle clearly turning left or riding a bicycle or small moped. However, drivers may pass other vehicles to the right in certain circumstances; these include heavy traffic where the speed is determined by the next vehicle and vehicles in reserved lanes.
- Finland – Undertaking is specifically prohibited, except for inner-city traffic and vehicle waiting to turn left or on the motorway if the vehicles in the lane to the left are queueing and slow moving.
- France – Undertaking is specifically prohibited, except for vehicle waiting to turn left or if the vehicles in the lane to the left are queueing and slow moving.
- Germany – Undertaking is specifically prohibited, exceptions exist for inner-city traffic and overtaking trams and vehicles waiting to turn left.
- Hungary – Undertaking is prohibited outside built-up areas. Inside built-up areas, passing on the right is permitted, but only if there are road markings. The undertaking manoeuvre in built-up areas is referred to as "driving in parallel traffic" instead of "passing on the right" as it is used outside built-up areas.
- Ireland – Undertaking permitted in three prescribed cases: 1) You want to go straight ahead when the driver in front of you has moved out and signalled that they intend to turn right. 2) You have signalled that you intend to turn left, 3) Traffic in both lanes is moving slowly but traffic in the left-hand lane is moving more quickly than the right-hand lane – for example, in slow moving stop/start traffic conditions.
- Netherlands – Undertaking is specifically prohibited, exceptions include vehicles waiting to turn left, traffic congestion and on roundabouts.
- Poland – Undertaking is legal on 4-lane roads in built-up areas, 6-lane roads outside built-up areas and on one-way roads with marked lanes (this definition includes motorways) (article 24 of Law on Road Traffic). However, similar to the UK, it is considered a dangerous practice and is discouraged.
- Romania – Undertaking is specifically prohibited, exceptions include vehicles waiting to turn left, traffic congestion and on roundabouts.
- Russia – Undertaking used to be known as "overtaking on the right" and was prohibited by the Road Rules until 2010. In 2010, a new term was introduced to the Road Rules, "passing", and applies to overtaking that does not make use of the oncoming lane. Therefore, undertaking was made legal, unless it would involve the use of the shoulder or sidewalk.
- Spain – Undertaking is specifically prohibited, except for inner-city traffic, passing a vehicle clearly turning left or in congested conditions.
- United Kingdom – The Highway Code discourages undertaking on motorways with some exceptions (rule 268): "Do not overtake on the left or move to a lane on your left to overtake". Undertaking is permitted in congested conditions when frequent lane changing is not recommended. On other roads, the Code advises drivers "should only overtake on the left if the vehicle in front is signalling to turn right" (rule 163). Rule 163 uses advisory wording and "will not, in itself, cause a person to be prosecuted", but may be used in evidence to establishing liability in any court proceedings. On all roads, undertaking is permitted if the vehicles in the lane to the right are queueing and slow moving. Undertaking in an aggressive or reckless manner could be considered Careless Driving or more seriously Dangerous Driving, both of which are legally enforceable offences.
- United States – Undertaking is typically allowed on multi-lane roadways or to pass left-turning vehicles. State laws can vary as to the situations that permit undertaking.

== Overtaking road signs ==
Andorra (no overtaking)

Andorra (no overtaking by trucks)

Argentina (no overtaking)

Argentina (end of overtaking prohibition)

Australia (Prohibition applies on bridge only)

Belarus (no overtaking and speed limit)

Canada (no overtaking)

Canada (overtaking permitted)

Chile (no overtaking)

Chile (end of overtaking prohibition)

China (no overtaking)

China (end of overtaking prohibition)

Colombia

Finland (no overtaking)

Finland (no overtaking by trucks)

Finland (end of overtaking prohibition)

Finland (end of trucks' overtaking prohibition)

Greece (no overtaking)

Greece (no overtaking by trucks)

Ireland

Japan

Nepal

Peru

Puerto Rico

United States

Singapore

South Korea

Sweden (no overtaking)

Sweden (no overtaking by trucks)

Taiwan

United Kingdom

United States

Uruguay

Vietnam (no overtaking)

== Overtaking in racing ==
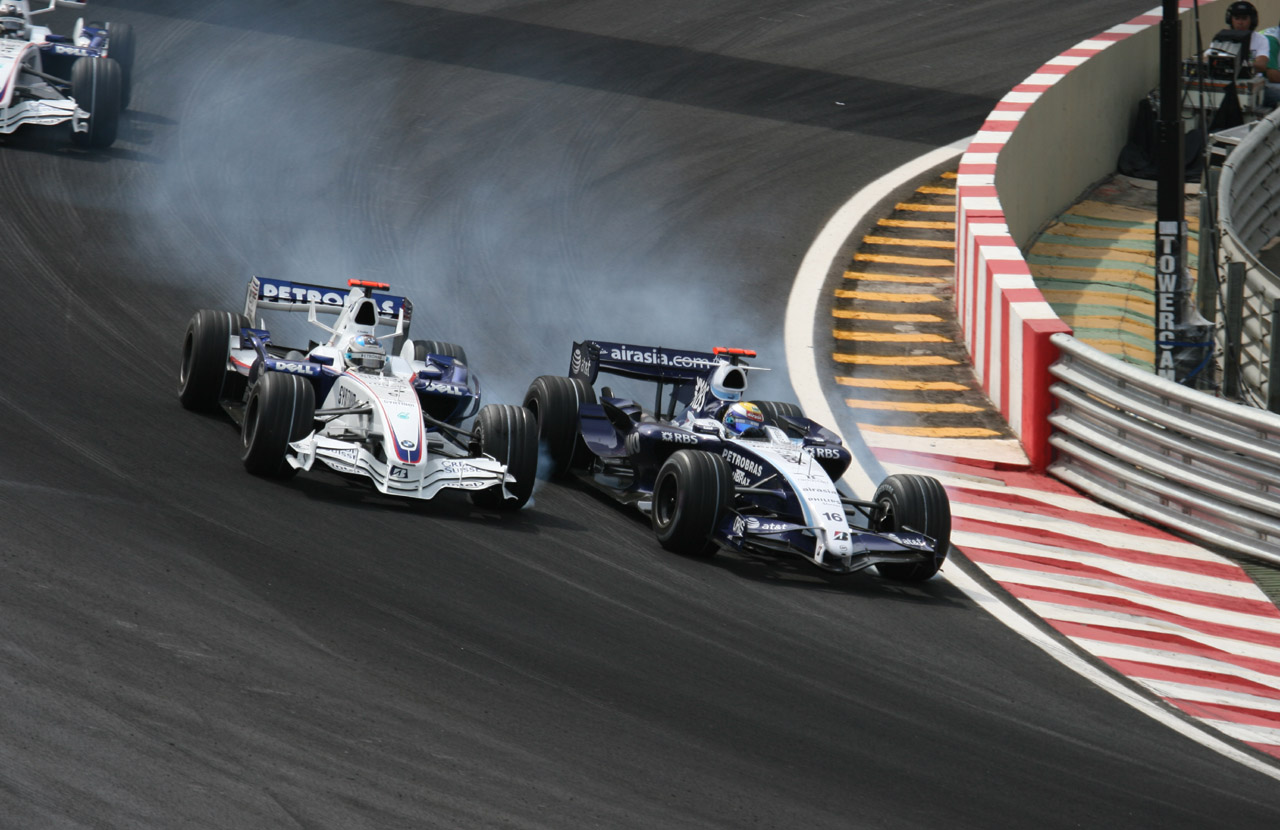
Nico Rosberg overtaking Nick Heidfeld in the 2007 Brazilian Grand Prix – a Formula One race

In racing, the rules allow overtaking from either side. Generally, the sides are classified as inside and outside overtaking, depending on the position of the overtaking car at the next curve since start of overtaking. The defending car usually blocks inside overtaking, because outside overtaking is riskier than inside overtaking.

== See also ==
- Automotive head-up display
- Driving
- Lane splitting
- Manoeuvre
- Throttle response
