= Performance car =

Car with above-average capabilities

A performance car is a car that exhibits above-average capabilities in one or more of the following areas: acceleration (torque and throttle response), top speed (horsepower), cornering and braking. It is debated how much performance is required to move classification from standard to high performance.

== Classification ==
Further classification of performance cars is possible in the following categories:

- Hot hatch — a high-performance version of a mass-produced hatchback model
- Sports sedan — a high-performance version of a sedan model
- Muscle car — a large American or Australian rear-wheel drive car with a V8 engine
- Sports car — a high performance designed with an emphasis on dynamic performance, such as handling, acceleration, top speed, the thrill of driving, and racing capability.
- Grand tourer — a luxury performance car designed for high speed and long-distance driving
- Supercar — a street-legal sports car with race track-like power, speed, and handling, plus a certain subjective cachet linked to pedigree and/or exclusivity
- Hypercar — Another term for high-performance sports cars, often used to describe the highest-performing supercars

== Gallery ==
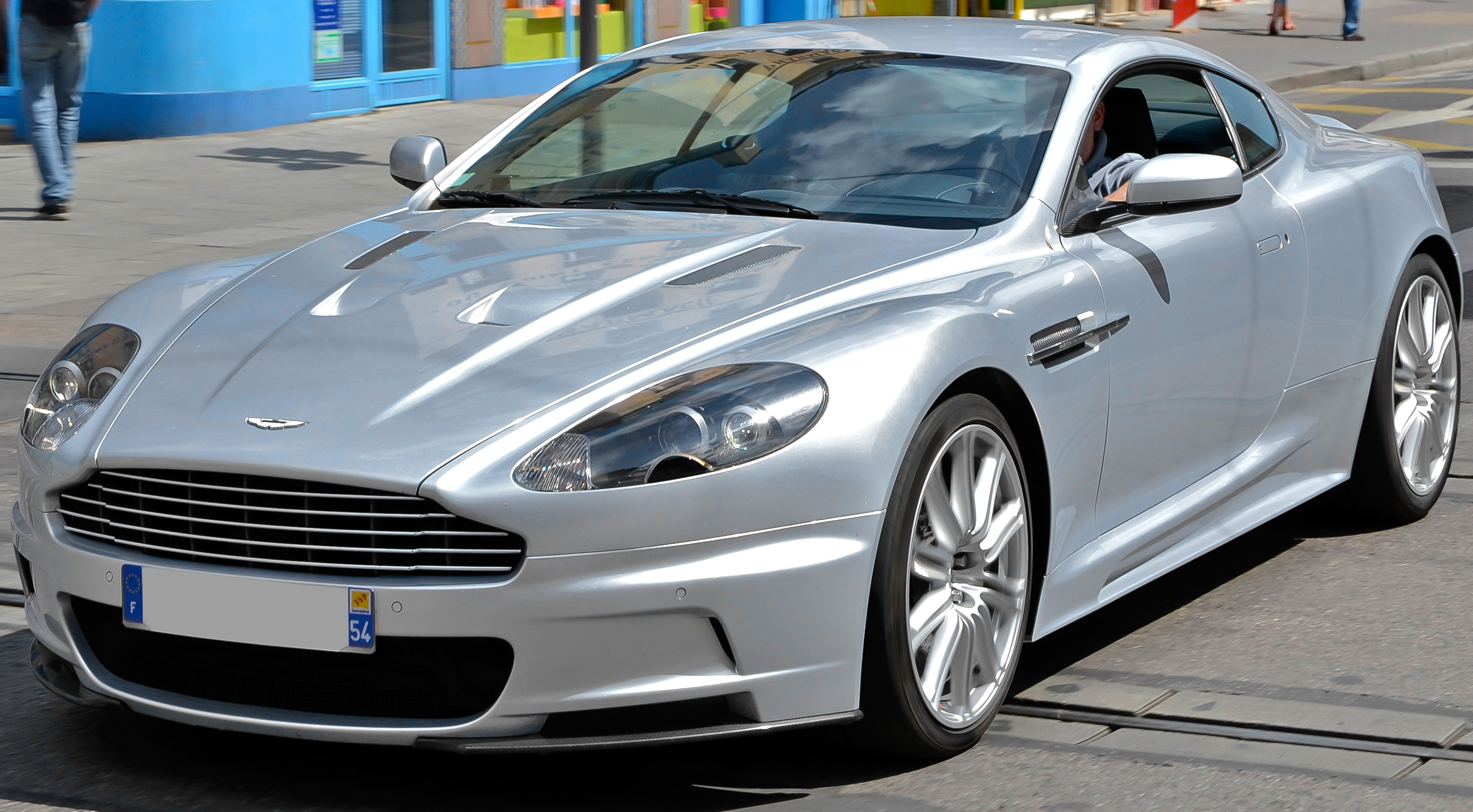
Aston Martin DBS V12 - grand tourer

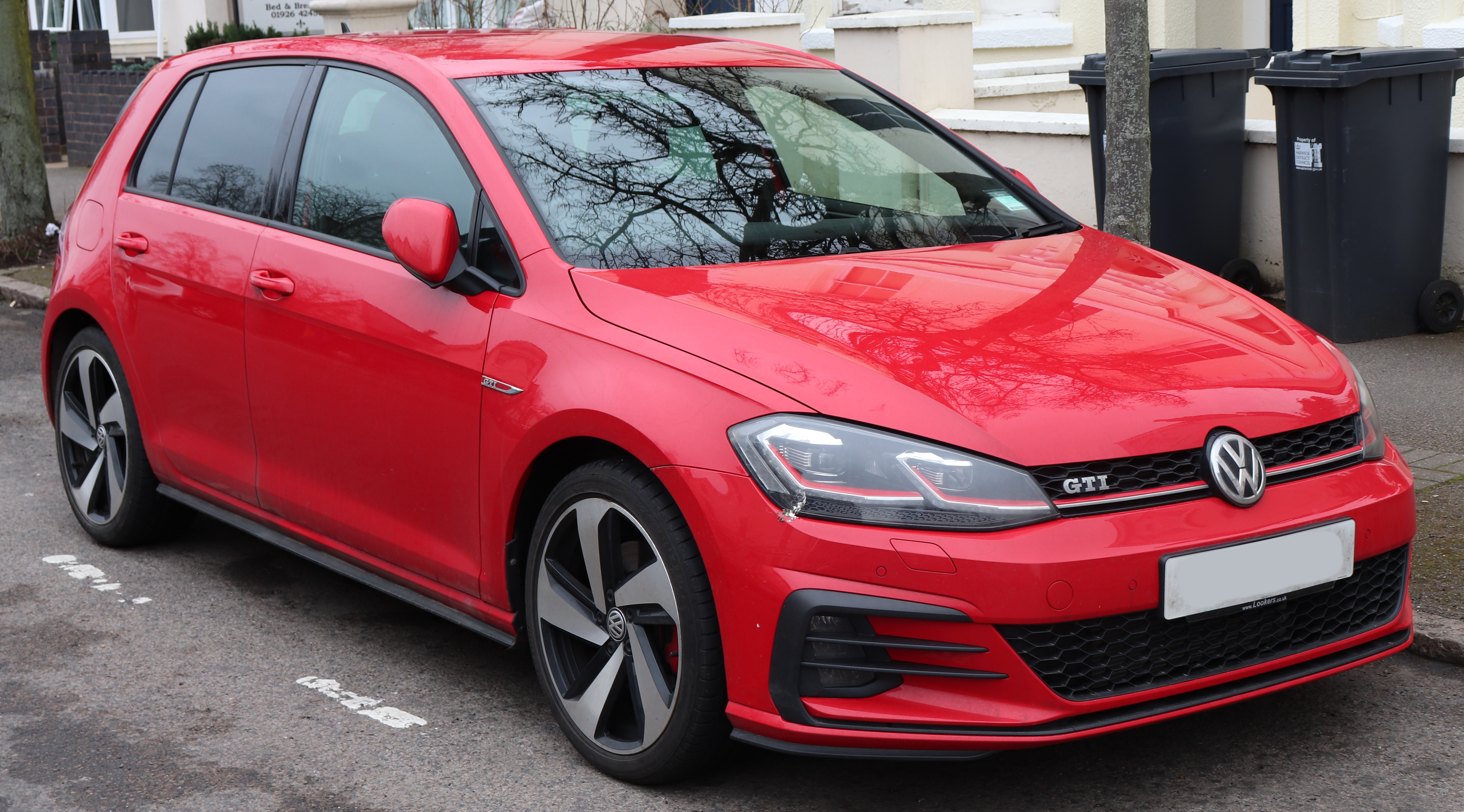
Volkswagen Golf GTI - hot hatch

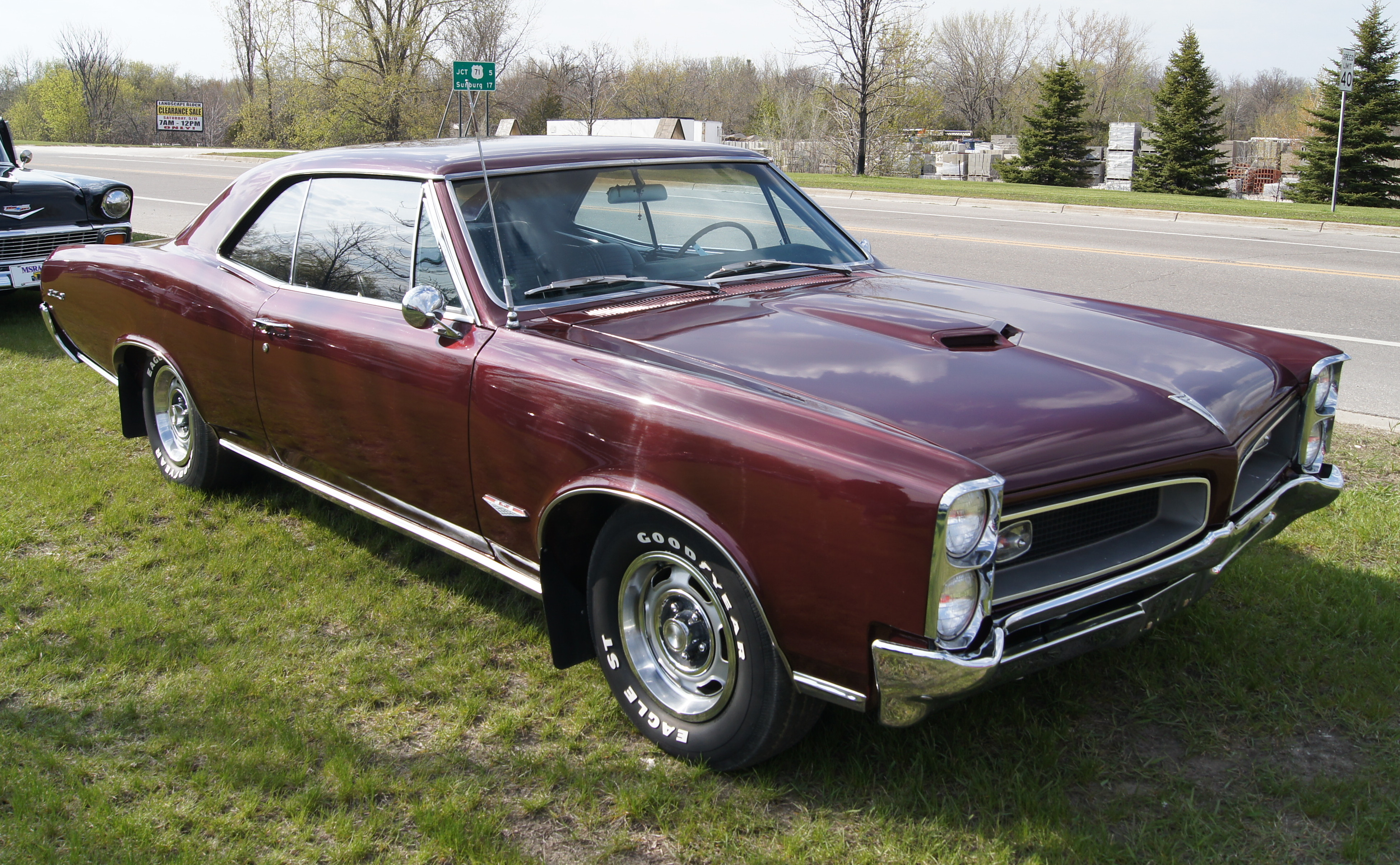
Pontiac GTO - muscle car

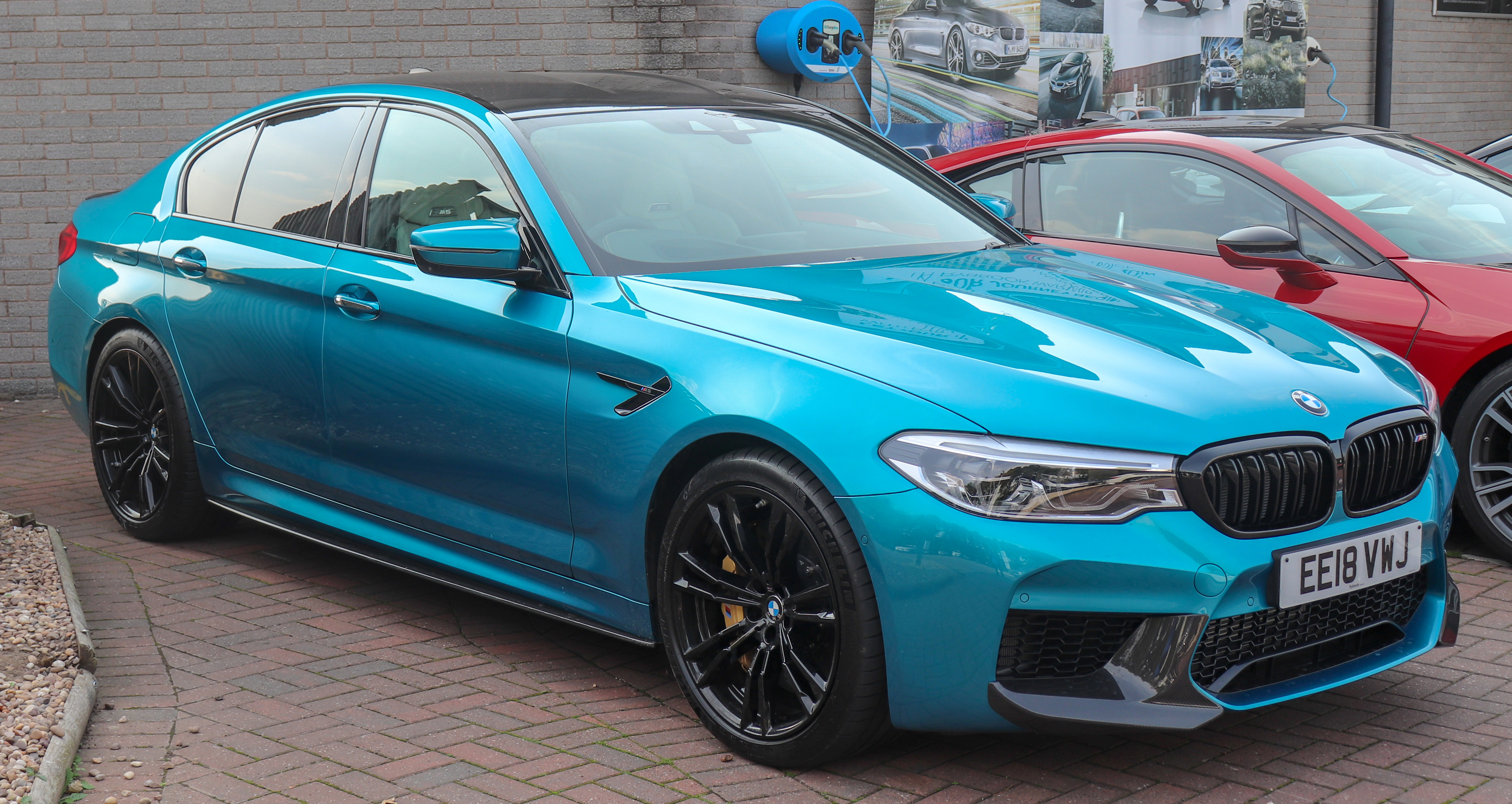
BMW M5 - sports sedan

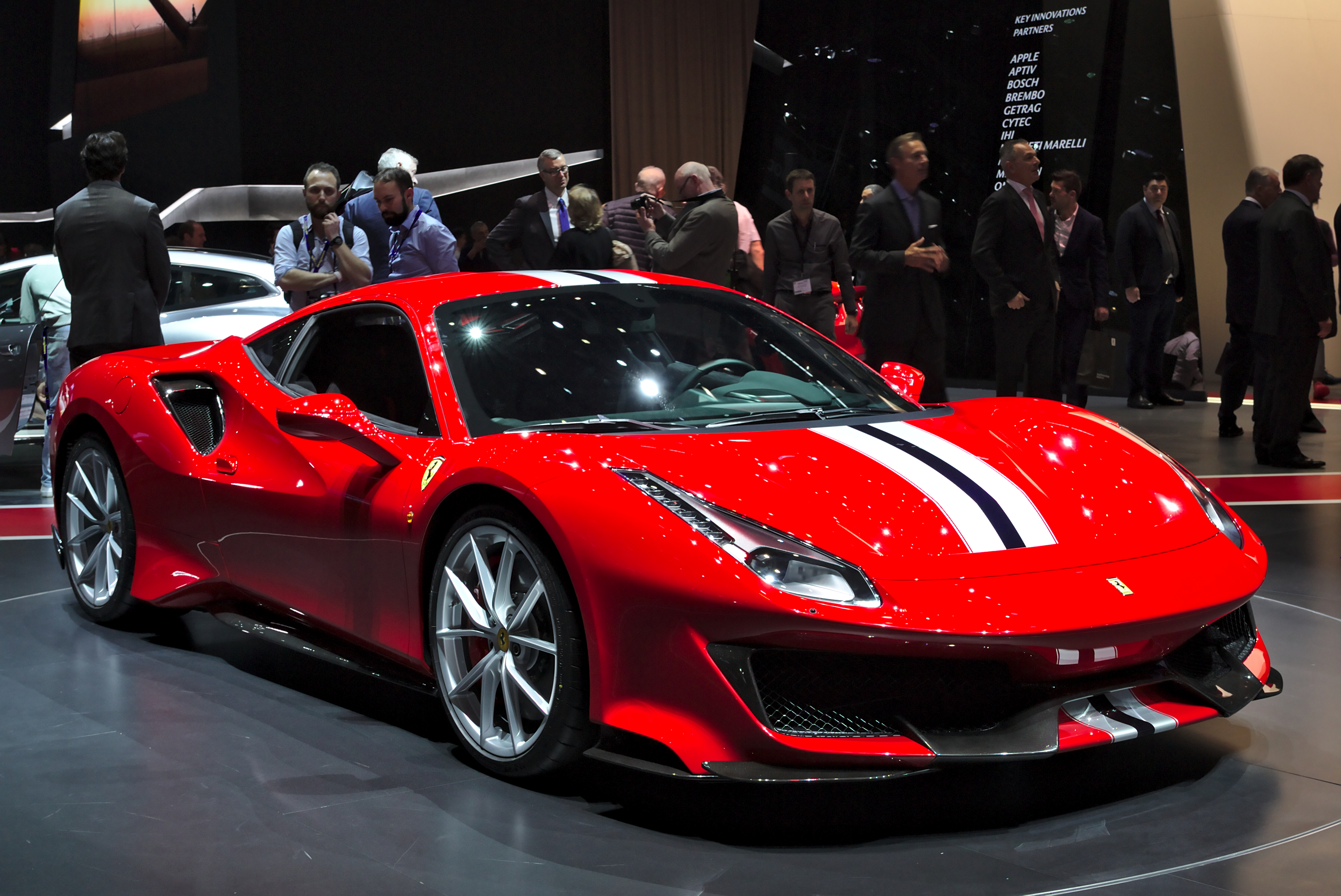
Ferrari 488 Pista - supercar

== See also ==
- Performance Car (magazine)
