= Peptide-methionine (S)-S-oxide reductase =

Class of enzymes

Identifiers
- EC no.: 1.8.4.11

Databases
- IntEnz: IntEnz view
- BRENDA: BRENDA entry
- ExPASy: NiceZyme view
- KEGG: KEGG entry
- MetaCyc: metabolic pathway
- PRIAM: profile
- PDB structures: RCSB PDB PDBe PDBsum
Search
- PMC: articles
- PubMed: articles
- NCBI: proteins

Peptide-methionine (S)-S-oxide reductase (EC 1.8.4.11, MsrA, methionine sulphoxide reductase A, methionine S-oxide reductase (S-form oxidizing), methionine sulfoxide reductase A, peptide methionine sulfoxide reductase, formerly protein-methionine-S-oxide reductase) is an enzyme with systematic name peptide-L-methionine:thioredoxin-disulfide S-oxidoreductase (L-methionine (S)-S-oxide-forming). This enzyme catalyses the following chemical reaction

(1) peptide-L-methionine + thioredoxin disulfide + H_{2}O $\rightleftharpoons$ peptide-L-methionine (S)-S-oxide + thioredoxin
(2) L-methionine + thioredoxin disulfide + H_{2}O $\rightleftharpoons$ L-methionine (S)-S-oxide + thioredoxin

The reaction occurs in the reverse direction.
