= Throttle response =

Throttle response or vehicle responsiveness is a measure of how quickly a vehicle's prime mover, such as an internal combustion engine, can increase its power output in response to a driver's request for acceleration. Throttles are not used in diesel engines, but the term throttle can be used to refer to any input that modulates the power output of a vehicle's prime mover. Increased throttle response is often confused with increased power (Since increasing throttle response reduces the time needed to reach higher RPM speeds and consequently provides immediate access to an internal combustion engine's power and makes a slow car equipped with that engine, for example, feel quicker) but is more accurately described as time rate of change of power levels.

== Gasoline vs diesel ==
Formerly, gasoline/petrol engines exhibited better throttle response than diesel engines. This results from higher specific power output and higher maximum engine power, as well as the fact that lower-powered diesel engines were disproportionately heavier. Recently diesel engines became able to outperform similar-sized petrol engines. Most naturally aspirated gasoline engines have better responsiveness than supercharged or turbocharged engines for engines with similar peak power outputs. However, factors such as improper maintenance, fouled spark plugs or bad injectors can reduce throttle response. Diesel engines are less likely to lose throttle response, since their power comes from self-igniting fuel. Older diesel engines directly connect the accelerator pedal to the injection pump resulting in instant response.

Several tuning factors can affect engine responsiveness. Throttle response in manual cars can be enhanced by dropping to a lower gear before accelerating. This action is often used in smaller cars to aid in overtaking.

== Engine design ==
The advent of concern about fuel economy and emissions had major impacts on engine design. Some of the trade-offs reduced throttle response. Most new cars employ a drive-by-wire system, which includes electronic throttle control and can itself either reduce or increase throttle response (Depending on whether or not it's being employed on a performance car). Earlier designs featured carburetors with an "accelerating pump" that made the fuel mix richer when the accelerator pedal was depressed suddenly, which increased hydrocarbon emissions. Later designs removed this feature.

== See also ==
- Driving
- Throttle
- Overtaking
