= Chip tuning =

Reprogramming a car to improve performance

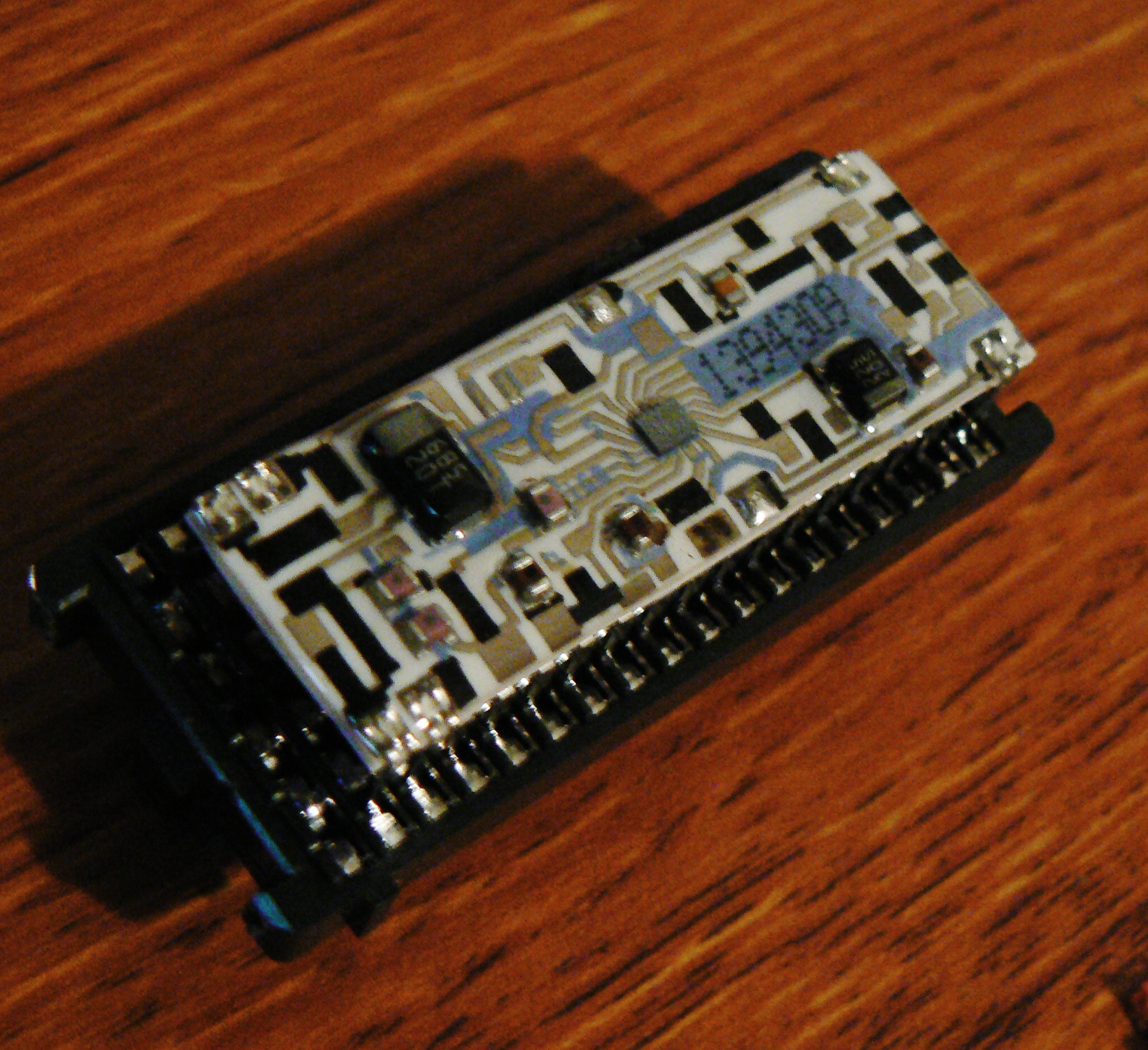
1995 Oldsmobile 88 Royal control chip module

Chip tuning is changing or modifying an erasable programmable read only memory chip in an automobile's or other vehicles electronic control unit (ECU) to achieve superior performance, whether it be more power, cleaner emissions, or better fuel efficiency. Engine manufacturers generally use a conservative electronic control unit map to allow for individual engine variations, as well as infrequent servicing and poor-quality fuel. Vehicles with a remapped electronic control unit may be more sensitive to fuel quality and service schedules.

This was done with early engine computers in the 1980s and 1990s, and it evolved over time with the technology that was available. Initially, it was fairly difficult to do, requiring desoldering the old non-programmable ROM chip from the ECU and replacing it with an EPROM chip that was programmed in hex using software on a computer. This was extremely time consuming and involved, and only certain people could understand how to tune an engine in hex, so software was developed to interface with the chips and provide a Graphical User Interface (GUI) for the user to view data like engine fuel maps to put onto the EPROM or later EEPROM chips.

Some vehicles, like the Chevrolet Corvette (C4) had a port where you could place your own chip into the ECU, so it didn't require desoldering the old chip. Chips started to be sold pre-programmed for certain vehicles and could be plugged into a port, if the ECU came with it, or into a dip socket that has to be soldered onto the board, depending on the manufacturer. Cars like the Honda Civic in the 1990s was known for being easy to tune and get a lot of power, even with a turbocharger, so many ECU's were tuned in this way.

Today, the term chip tuning can be misleading, as people will often use it to describe ECU tuning that does not involve swapping the chip. Modern electronic control units can be tuned by simply updating their software through a standard interface, such as On Board Diagnostics. This procedure is commonly referred to as engine or electronic control unit tuning. Electronic control units are a relatively recent addition to the automobile, having first appeared in the late 1970s.

As technology advanced, so did the electronics that go into cars. The electronic control unit in a modern automobile, together with advanced engine technology, makes it possible to control many aspects of the engine's operation, such as spark timing and fuel injection. The electronic control unit may also control electronic throttle control (drive-by-wire), poppet valve timing, boost control (in turbocharged engines), Anti-lock braking system, the automatic transmission, speed governor (if equipped), and the Electronic Stability Control system.

Performance gains are realized by adjusting the ignition timing advance. Different timing may result in better performance. However, to cope with advanced timing, one must run high-octane gasoline to avoid pre-ignition detonation or pinging. Manufacturers design for a specific timing and this may limit performance accordingly.

In addition, changing fuel maps to coincide with the stoichiometric ratio for gasoline combustion may also realize performance increase. Most manufacturers tune for optimum emissions (running rich to protect the catalytic converter) and fuel economy purposes which can limit performance.

Cars with a turbo fitted can have the requested and allowable boost levels raised, these applications usually have the most effect if the turbo fitted is a low pressure turbo which leaves the most room for improvement.

Another reason to change the electronic control unit map is if there are engine, intake, or exhaust modifications to the car. These "bolt-on" modifications alter the way that the engine flows, often causing the air to fuel ratio to change. Without re-mapping the fuel tables, some of the performance gains from the modifications may not be realized.

A poorly tuned electronic control unit can result in decreased performance, driveability, and may even cause engine damage.

The most common way to "upgrade" the electronic control unit is using either plug in modules as mentioned above or using a specialist tuner who will use an Onboard Diagnostics Flash tool. These devices generally plug into the diagnostic port although in some cases the reprogramming is done directly on the circuit board. Maps are supplied by tuners.

There has been an influx of plug in devices in the market which claim that they can intercept the OBD protocol and force the sensor readings in a way that it can improve fuel efficiency as well as improve performance. However, this is simply not possible as the mapping of the sensors on the CAN bus varies from one car to another and sending random data into the bus will cause issues. This is a well known fact to the manufacturers of such misleading devices, so all of them will have phantom tracks which appear to start at the OBD connector and go into the PCB, but they either will be left unconnected or be connected to a microcontroller, which will not utilize the pin for anything.

There is no evidence that such low cost plug in devices will be able to improve performance. However, there is evidence present from reverse engineering of the products that they are indeed a scam. The way people are being tricked is that the devices will only flash LEDs and, in most of such devices, the LEDs are the only components that have a valid connection to the controller, along with accompanying resistors to limit the current, a voltage regulator which has generally been observed as a linear regulator and then the power and ground wire. These to the average person might look like an intricate circuit, especially with the two board construction, but all of that is purely a smokescreen to bring home the illusion.

Such devices rely on the fact actual products exist which can be used to change the programming of the ECU and these reprogramming methods are not a plug in solution. They are very expensive products, which will come with data for different cars, and it is an involved process to make any noticeable change in the performance or efficiency.

== See also ==
- Engine tuning
