= Methionine-S-oxide reductase =

Identifiers
- EC no.: 1.8.4.5
- CAS no.: 70248-65-6

Databases
- IntEnz: IntEnz view
- BRENDA: BRENDA entry
- ExPASy: NiceZyme view
- KEGG: KEGG entry
- MetaCyc: metabolic pathway
- PRIAM: profile
- PDB structures: RCSB PDB PDBe PDBsum
Search
- PMC: articles
- PubMed: articles
- NCBI: proteins

Methionine-S-oxide reductase (EC 1.8.4.5, methyl sulfoxide reductase I and II, acetylmethionine sulfoxide reductase, methionine sulfoxide reductase, L-methionine:oxidized-thioredoxin S-oxidoreductase) is an enzyme with systematic name L-methionine:thioredoxin-disulfide S-oxidoreductase. This enzyme catalyses the following chemical reaction

L-methionine + thioredoxin disulfide + H_{2}O $\rightleftharpoons$ L-methionine S-oxide + thioredoxin

In the reverse reaction, dithiothreitol can replace reduced thioredoxin.

S-Methionine-S-oxide and R-Methionine-S-oxide require different Methionine-S-oxide reductases, named Methionine-S-oxide reductase A and Methionine-S-oxide reductase B respectively. A Methionine-S-oxide reductase B named AtMSRB plays a large role in salt tolerance in Arabidopsis Thaliana.
