= Specific absorption rate =

Measure of absorption of energy by humans

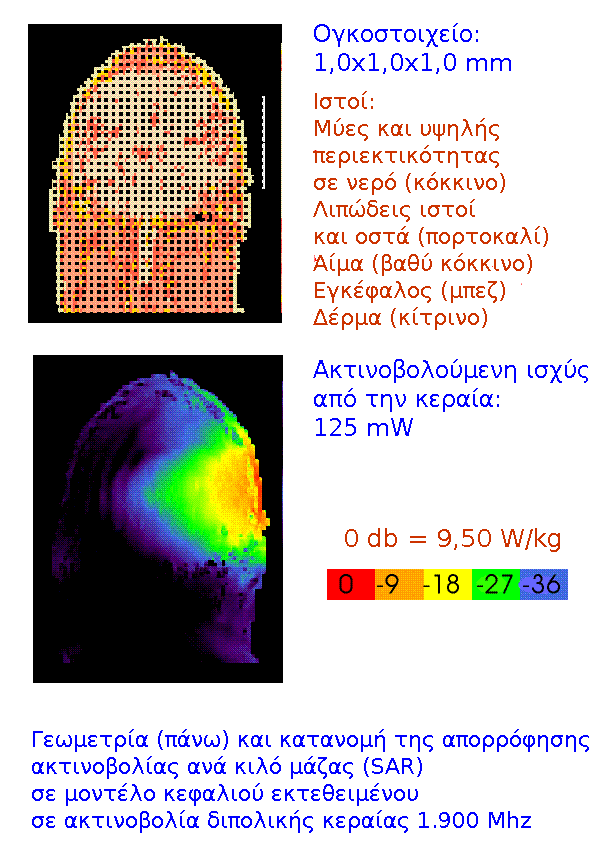
SAR (Specific Absorption Rate) in a human head model with 125 mW radiation (from a regular cell phone).

Specific absorption rate (SAR) is a measure of the rate at which energy is absorbed per unit mass by a human body when exposed to a radio frequency (RF) electromagnetic field. It is defined as the power absorbed per mass of tissue and has units of watts per kilogram (W/kg).

SAR is usually averaged either over the whole body, or over a small sample volume (typically 1 g or 10 g of tissue). The value cited is then the maximum level measured in the body part studied over the stated volume or mass.

== Calculation ==
SAR for electromagnetic energy can be calculated from the electric field within the tissue as

$$\text{SAR} = \frac{1}{V}\int_\text{sample} \frac{\sigma(\mathbf{r}) |\mathbf{E}(\mathbf{r})|^2}{\rho(\mathbf{r})} \,d\mathbf{r},$$

where

$\sigma$ is the sample electrical conductivity,
$E$ is the RMS electric field,
$\rho$ is the sample density,
$V$ is the volume of the sample.

SAR measures exposure to fields between 100 kHz and 10 GHz (known as radio waves). It is commonly used to measure power absorbed from mobile phones and during MRI scans. The value depends heavily on the geometry of the part of the body that is exposed to the RF energy and on the exact location and geometry of the RF source. Thus tests must be made with each specific source, such as a mobile phone model and at the intended position of use.

=== Mobile phone SAR testing ===
When measuring the SAR due to a mobile phone the phone is placed against a representation of a human head (a "SAR Phantom") in a talk position. The SAR value is then measured at the location that has the highest absorption rate in the entire head, which in the case of a mobile phone is often as close to the phone's antenna as possible. Measurements are made for different positions on both sides of the head and at different frequencies representing the frequency bands at which the device can transmit. Depending on the size and capabilities of the phone, additional testing may also be required to represent usage of the device while placed close to the user's body and/or extremities. Various governments have defined maximum SAR levels for RF energy emitted by mobile devices:

- United States: the FCC requires that phones sold have a SAR level at or below 1.6 watts per kilogram (W/kg) taken over the volume containing a mass of 1 gram of tissue that is absorbing the most signal.
- European Union: CENELEC specify SAR limits within the EU, following IEC standards. For mobile phones, and other such hand-held devices, the SAR limit is 2 W/kg averaged over the 10 g of tissue absorbing the most signal (IEC 62209-1).

SAR values are heavily dependent on the size of the averaging volume. Without information about the averaging volume used, comparisons between different measurements cannot be made. Thus, the European 10-gram ratings should be compared among themselves, and the American 1-gram ratings should only be compared among themselves. To check SAR on your mobile phone, review the documentation provided with the phone, dial *#07# (only works on some models) or visit the manufacturer's website.

=== MRI scanner SAR testing ===
For magnetic resonance imaging the limits (described in IEC 60601-2-33) are slightly more complicated:

	Whole-body SAR	Partial-body SAR	Head SAR	Local SAR (a)		
Body region →	whole body	exposed body part	head	head	trunk	extremities
Operating mode ↓	(W/kg)	(W/kg)	(W/kg)	(W/kg)	(W/kg)	(W/kg)
Normal	2	2–10 (b)	3.2	10 (c)	10	20
1st level controlled	4	4–10 (b)	3.2	20 (c)	20	40
2nd level controlled	>4	>(4–10) (b)	>3.2	>20 (c)	>20	>40
Short-duration SAR	The SAR limit over any 10 s period shall not exceed two times the stated values					

Note: Averaging time of 6 minutes.
(a) Local SAR is determined over the mass of 10 g.
(b) The limit scales dynamically with the ratio "exposed patient mass / patient mass":

Normal operating mode: Partial body SAR = 10 W/kg − (8 W/kg × exposed patient mass / patient mass).
1st level controlled: Partial body SAR = 10 W/kg − (6 W/kg × exposed patient mass / patient mass).

(c) In cases where the orbit is in the field of a small local RF transmit coil, care should be taken to ensure that the temperature rise is limited to 1 °C.

== Criticism ==
SAR limits set by law do not consider that the human body is particularly sensitive to the power peaks or frequencies responsible for the microwave hearing effect. Frey reports that the microwave hearing effect occurs with average power density exposures of 400 μW/cm^{2}, well below SAR limits (as set by government regulations).

Notes:

In comparison to the short term, relatively intensive exposures described above, for long-term environmental exposure of the general public there is a limit of 0.08 W/kg averaged over the whole body. A whole-body average SAR of 0.4 W/kg has been chosen as the restriction that provides adequate protection for occupational exposure. An additional safety factor of 5 is introduced for exposure of the public, giving an average whole-body SAR limit of 0.08 W/kg.

=== FCC advice ===
The FCC guide "Specific Absorption Rate (SAR) For Cell Phones: What It Means For You", after detailing the limitations of SAR values, offers the following "bottom line" editorial:

ALL cell phones must meet the FCC’s RF exposure standard, which is set at a level well below that at which laboratory testing indicates, and medical and biological experts generally agree, adverse health effects could occur. For users who are concerned with the adequacy of this standard or who otherwise wish to further reduce their exposure, the most effective means to reduce exposure are to hold the cell phone away from the head or body and to use a speakerphone or hands-free accessory. These measures will generally have much more impact on RF energy absorption than the small difference in SAR between individual cell phones, which, in any event, is an unreliable comparison of RF exposure to consumers, given the variables of individual use.

=== MSBE (minimum SAR with biological effect) ===
In order to find out possible advantages and the interaction mechanisms of electromagnetic fields (EMF), the minimum SAR (or intensity) that could have biological effect (MSBE) would be much more valuable in comparison to studying high-intensity fields. Such studies can possibly shed light on thresholds of non-ionizing radiation effects and cell capabilities (e.g., oxidative response). In addition, it is more likely to reduce the complexity of the EMF interaction targets in cell cultures by lowering the exposure power, which at least reduces the overall rise in temperature. This parameter might differ regarding the case under study and depends on the physical and biological conditions of the exposed target.

== FCC regulations ==
The FCC regulations for SAR are contained in 47 C.F.R. 1.1307(b), 1.1310, 2.1091, 2.1093 and also discussed in OET Bulletin No. 56, "Questions and Answers About the Biological Effects and Potential Hazards of Radiofrequency Electromagnetic Fields."

== European regulations ==
Specific energy absorption rate (SAR) averaged over the whole body or over parts of the body, is defined as the rate at which energy is absorbed per unit mass of body tissue and is expressed in watts per kilogram (W/kg).

Whole body SAR is a widely accepted measure for relating adverse thermal effects to RF exposure.

Legislative acts in the European Union include directive 2013/35/EU of the European Parliament and of the Council of 26 June 2013 on the minimum health and safety requirements regarding the exposure of workers to the risks arising from physical agents (electromagnetic fields) (20th individual Directive within the meaning of Article 16(1) of Directive 89/391/EEC) and repealing Directive 2004/40/EC) in its annex III "THERMAL EFFECTS" for "EXPOSURE LIMIT VALUES AND ACTION LEVELS IN THE FREQUENCY RANGE FROM 100 kHz TO 300 GHz".

== See also ==
- Dielectric heating
- Electromagnetic radiation and health
