= Sarkozy (surname) =

Sarkozy (variants include: Sárközy, Sárközi, Sarközy, Sarközi, Sarkozi) is a Hungarian surname. It is a toponymic surname, and means "from Sárköz". Notable people with the surname include:

- Nicolas Sarkozy (born 1955), French politician, president of France 2007–2012
  - Cécilia Attias (born 1957), formerly known as Cécilia Sarkozy, ex-wife of Nicolas Sarkozy
  - Carla Bruni-Sarkozy (born 1967), formerly known as Carla Bruni, third and current wife of Nicolas Sarkozy
  - Jean Sarkozy (born 1986), French politician, second son of Nicolas Sarkozy and Marie-Dominique Culioli
  - Guillaume Sarkozy, the older brother of Nicolas Sarkozy
  - Olivier Sarkozy, French businessman, half-brother of Nicolas Sarkozy
- András Sárközy, Hungarian mathematician
- Gábor N. Sárközy, Hungarian-American mathematician
- Gabor Sarkøzy (also Sárközy Gábor) (1945–2008), Hungarian-Norwegian (porn) actor and director
- Gergely Sárközy (born 1941), Hungarian musician
- György Sárközi (1899–1945), Hungarian translator and writer
- István Sárközi (1947–1992), Hungarian footballer
- István Sárközy (1920–2002), Hungarian composer
- Lajos Sárközi (born 1967), Hungarian hurdler
- Rudolf Sarközi (1944–2016), Austrian Porajmos survivor
- Anton Hans Sarközi as Tony Wegas (born 1965), Austrian singer and television actor.
