= Patrick Bernasconi =

French business executive (born 16 July 1955)

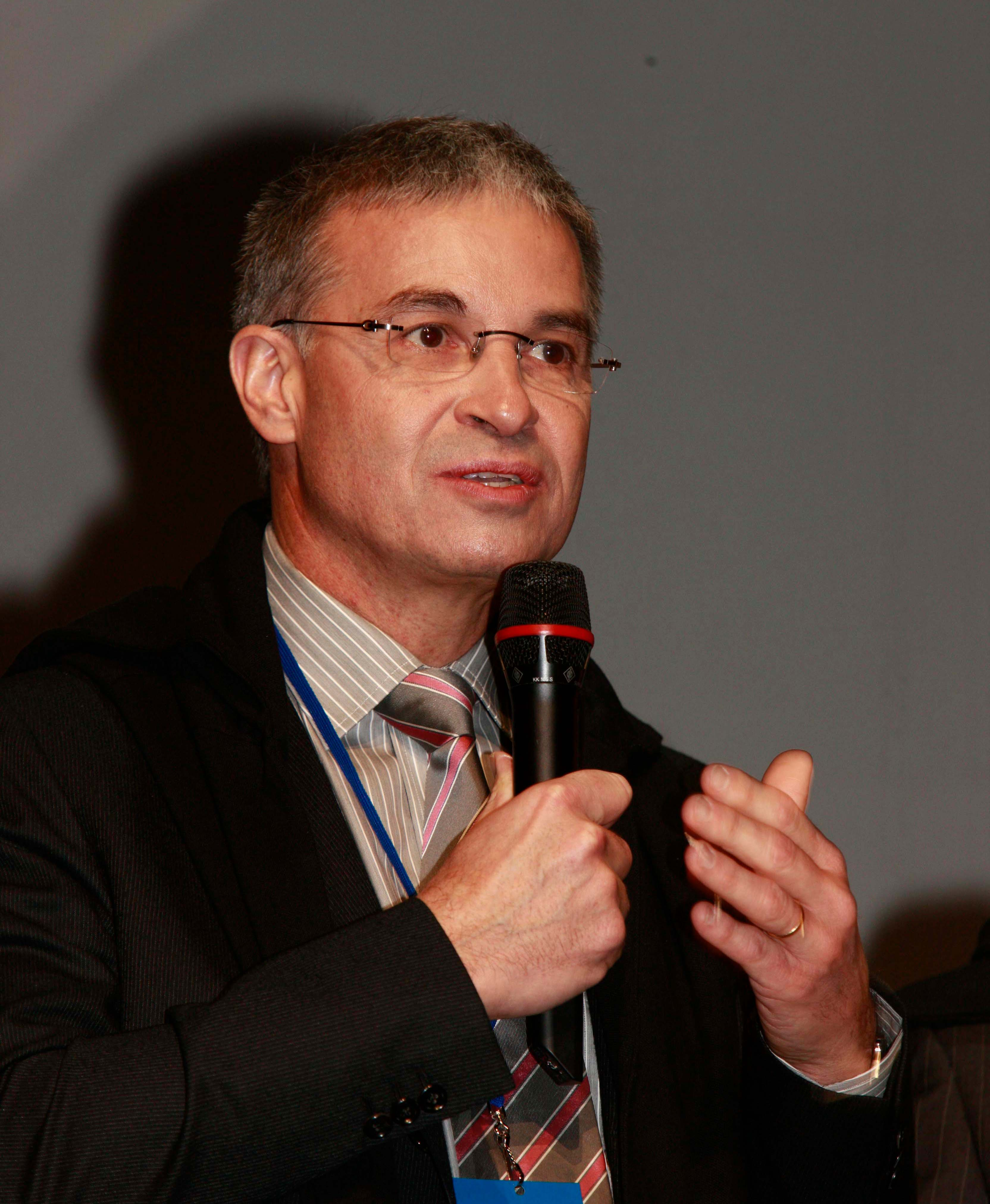

President of the French Economic, Social and Environmental Council
- In office 1 December 2015 – 18 May 2021
- President: François Hollande; Emmanuel Macron
- Preceded by: Jean-Paul Delevoye
- Succeeded by: Thierry Beaudet

President of the Fédération nationale des travaux publics
- In office 2005 – 17 September 2013

Personal details
- Born: 16 July 1955 (age 71) Domjean, France
- Education: École Spéciale des Travaux Publics

Patrick Bernasconi (born 16 July 1955 in Domjean) is a French business executive. He is responsible for four public works companies. He was elected president of the French Economic, Social and Environmental Council on 1 December 2015.

A graduate of the École Spéciale des Travaux Publics, he was the president of the National Federation of Public Works (FNTP) from 2005 to 2013 and executive board member of the MEDEF.

== Biography ==
As his surname suggests, Bernasconi is the grandson of an Italian bricklayer immigrant from Trentino (Molina di Ledro) who emigrated to Normandy in 1920.
