= ESTP =

ESTP can refer to:

- One of 16 Myers–Briggs Type Indicators
- A personality type in Socionics
- École Spéciale des Travaux Publics, a graduate school in France
