= Family history of Nicolas Sarkozy =

Coat of arms of the Sárközy de Nagy-Bócsa family

Former President of France Nicolas Sarkozy is of mixed national and ethnic ancestry. He is the son of Pál István Ernő Sárközy de Nagy-Bócsa (Hungarian: nagybócsai Sárközy Pál [ˈnɒɟboːt͡ʃɒi ˈʃaːrkøzi ˈpaːl], in some sources Nagy-Bócsay Sárközy Pál István Ernő) (5 May 1928 – 4 March 2023), a Hungarian nobleman, and his wife, Andrée Jeanne "Dadu" Mallah (Paris, 12 October 1925 – 13 December 2017), who was of Thessalonian Jewish and French Catholic origin. They were married at Saint-François-de-Sales, Paris XVII, on 8 February 1950 and divorced in 1959.

== Pál Sárközy ==
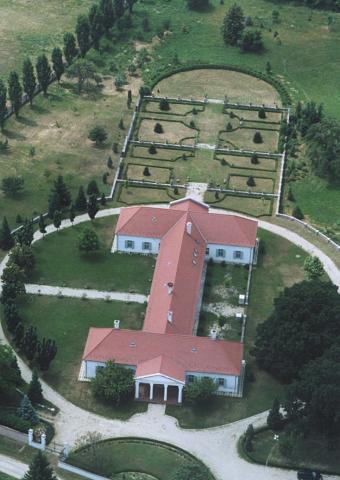
Aerial view of the Sarkozy castle, surrounded by family estate in Kisasszond, Somogy County, Hungary

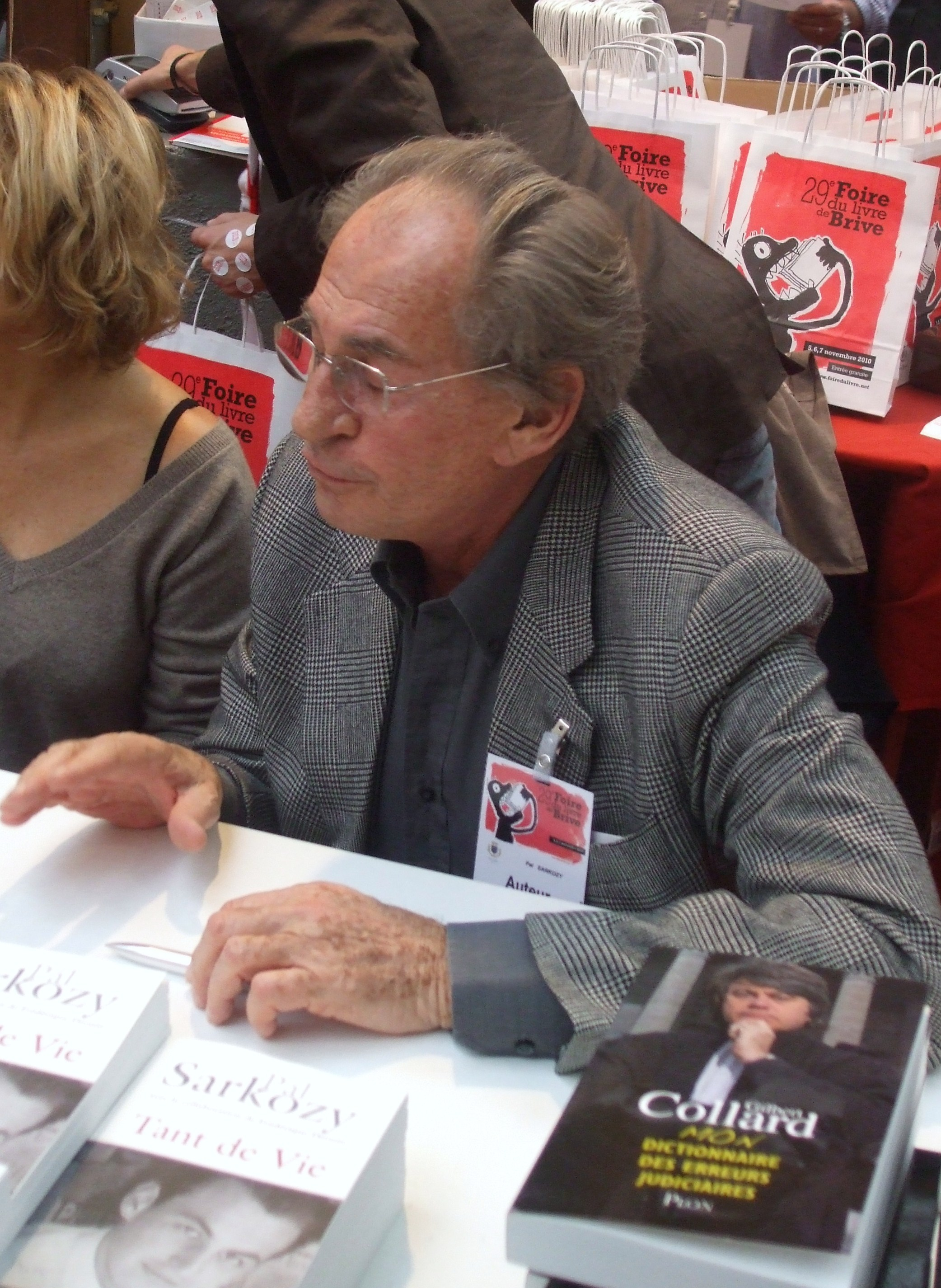
Pál Sárközy at the 2010 Brive-la-Gaillarde book fair

Pál Sárközy was born on 5 May 1928 in Budapest into a family belonging to the Hungarian nobility. His paternal ancestor was elevated to the untitled nobility in the Kingdom of Hungary on 10 September 1628 by Ferdinand II for his role in fighting the armies of the Ottoman Empire. The family possessed 285 hectares (700 acres) of land (reduced from an estate of 400–800 ha (990–1,980 acres) in the 18th century), and a small castle in the village of Alattyán, near Szolnok, 92 km (57 mi) east of Budapest. Pál Sárközy's father and grandfather held elective offices in the city of Szolnok. Although the Sárközy de Nagy-Bócsa family (nagybócsai Sárközy) was Protestant, Pál Sárközy's mother, Katalin Tóth de Csáford (Hungarian: csáfordi Tóth Katalin), grandmother of Nicolas Sarkozy, belonged to a Catholic noble family.

As the Red Army entered Hungary in 1944, the Sárközy family fled to Germany. They returned in 1945 but all their possessions had been seized. Pál Sárközy's father died soon afterwards and his mother, fearing that he would be drafted into the Hungarian People's Army or sent to Serbia, urged him to leave the country and promised she would eventually follow him to Paris. Pál Sárközy fled to Austria and then Germany while his mother reported to authorities that he had drowned in Lake Balaton.

=== French Foreign Legion ===
Eventually, he arrived in Baden-Baden, near the French border, where the headquarters of the French Army in Germany were located, and there he met a recruiter for the French Foreign Legion. He signed up for five years, like many recruits who were destitute like himself, and was sent for training to Sidi Bel Abbes, where the French Foreign Legion's headquarters were located. He was due to be sent to Indochina at the end of training, but the doctor who checked him before departure, who was also Hungarian, sympathised with him and gave him a medical discharge to save him from possible death at the hands of the Viet Minh.

==== Return to civilian life ====
He returned to civilian life in Marseille in 1948 and, although he asked for French citizenship only in the 1970s (his legal status was that of a stateless person until then), he nonetheless gallicised his Hungarian name into "Paul Sarközy de Nagy-Bocsa". He met Andrée Mallah (known as Dadu) in 1949. He died on 4 March 2023, at the age of 94.

== Andrée Mallah ==
Andrée Mallah, then a law student, was the daughter of Benedict Mallah, a well-off urological surgeon with a well-established reputation in the mainly bourgeois 17th arrondissement of Paris. Benedict Mallah, originally named Aaron Mallah (and nicknamed Benico), was born in 1890 in the Sephardic Jewish community of the city of Selânik, Sanjak of Salonica, Ottoman Empire (now Thessaloniki and part of Greece). The family had originally been from Spain, then resettled in Provence, southern France, and later moved to Selânik into the Jewish community established there by other Spanish expellee victims of the Spanish Inquisition, at the invitation of Sultan Bayezid II. Benico Mallah, the son of jeweller Mordechai Mallah and Reyna Magriso, left Selânik with his mother in 1904 at the age of 14 to attend the prestigious Lycée Lakanal boarding school of Sceaux, in the southern suburbs of Paris. He studied medicine after his baccalaureate and decided to stay in France and become a French citizen. A doctor in the French Army during World War I, he met a recent war widow, Adèle Bouvier (1891–1956), whom he married in 1917. Adèle Bouvier, Nicolas Sarkozy's maternal grandmother, was born to a wealthy Catholic bourgeois family from Lyon. Mallah, for whom religion had reportedly never been a central issue, converted to Catholicism upon marrying Adèle Bouvier, which had been requested by Adèle's parents, and changed his name to Benedict. Although Benedict Mallah converted to Catholicism, he and his family nonetheless had to flee Paris and take refuge in a small farm in Corrèze during World War II to avoid being arrested and delivered to the Germans. During the Holocaust, many of the Mallahs who stayed in Thessaloniki or moved to France were deported to concentration and extermination camps. In total, 57 family members were murdered by the Nazis.

Paul Sarkozy and Andrée Mallah settled in the 17th arrondissement of Paris and had three sons: Guillaume, born in 1951, who is an entrepreneur in the textile industry and current vice president of the MEDEF (French union of employers); Nicolas, born in 1955; and François, born in 1957, who is the manager of a health care consultancy company. In 1959, Paul Sarkozy left his wife and his three children. He later remarried three times and had two more children, Caroline and Olivier Sarkozy.

== Global affiliations ==
Paul Sarkozy's son, Olivier, was chosen by the Carlyle Group in March 2008 as co-head and managing director of its recently launched global financial services division. On November 27, 2015, he married fashion designer Mary-Kate Olsen.

Christine de Ganay is a former wife of Pal. She is married to Frank G. Wisner, who retired from American International Group (AIG). His father, Frank Wisner, Sr. worked for the Central Intelligence Agency and its predecessor the OSS, in charge of covert operations. It has been alleged that AIG, which financially collapsed in 2008, insures CIA facilities globally.
