= Marcel Deviq =

French Algerian engineer and politician (1907–1972)

Member of the National Assembly for the Oasis constituency
- In office 30 November 1958 – 3 July 1962

Personal details
- Born: Armand-Marcel Deviq; 10 April 1907 Batna, French Algeria
- Died: 17 June 1972 (aged 65) Paris, France
- Party: Unity of the Republic
- Children: 3
- Education: ESTP Paris

Armand-Marcel Deviq (10 April 1907 – 17 June 1972) was a French Algerian engineer, businessman, and politician who served in the National Assembly of France from 1958 until 1962. A member of the Unity of the Republic party, he represented a large portion of southeastern Algeria. Deviq and his family were the owners of the Compagnie Saharienne Automobile, which provided commercial transportation services across the Sahara Desert.

== Biography ==
=== Early life and business career ===
Armand-Marcel Deviq was born on 10 April 1907 in Batna, a city in French Algeria. Deviq was a Pied-Noir, an ethnic French person who lived in Algeria. His grandfather, a vintner from the French region of Cévennes, moved to Algeria in 1878 after his crops were ruined by insects. Settling in Batna, he founded a transportation company which provided commercial transit services to surrounding towns using horse-drawn carriages. Deviq's father Armand took over the company in 1907 and began establishing routes further into central Algeria, connecting the desert cities of Touggourt and El Oued. The company acquired its first truck, a 2.5 T Renault, in 1925, and a connection between Touggourt and Ouargla was established the following year.

In 1928, Deviq graduated from the École Spéciale des Travaux Publics and began working at the company along with his brother René, who was two years younger. The company expanded rapidly across the Sahara in the 1930s, with routes able to reach Fort Flatters in the central desert by 1931 and In Guezzam in the far south by 1936. Around this period, the Deviq brothers began jointly leading the company, and it was renamed from Armand Deviq et sons to the Compagnie Saharienne Automobile, with Marcel working as director of engineering and René becoming the managing director.

The outbreak of World War II slowed the company's growth, as spare engine parts became difficult to acquire. Deviq was placed under house arrest by the Vichy government due to his sympathies for the Free French Forces, though he was released after only a few months due to the influence the two brothers held in the region. The post-war period saw the company achieve wide success, as spare parts were able to be scrapped from surrendered Italian materiel, while an oil boom in the 1950s led to the Compagnie Saharienne Automobile expanding their fleet to 260 vehicles and working with Berliet to develop the Berliet T100, a heavy-duty truck designed for the rough desert environment. In 1947, Deviq also became a member of the Société astronomique de France.

=== Political career, later life, and death ===
In the 1958 French legislative election, Deviq was elected to the National Assembly, representing the Oasis department – which consisted of a large portion of southeastern Algeria – as a member of the Unity of the Republic party. Deviq was a staunch supporter of a continued union between France and Algeria, favored "a modernization that respects traditions", and advocated for the Sahara region to be better integrated into the country. In his role as vice president of the parliamentary Commission for Production and Trade, Deviq was involved in establishing France's financial policy for the Sahara; among his proposals was the establishment of a Saharan bank.

Towards the end of the Algerian War in the early 1960s, Deviq raised concerns over the French military's abandonment of the Sahara to the National Liberation Front, and he raised concerns for the security of Europeans in Algeria due to a rise in ethnic violence, particularly suicide bombings. He was later a critic of the Évian Accords, the 1962 peace treaties which ended the Algerian War and led to Algeria becoming an independent nation. The parliamentary tenure of Deviq and the other French Algerian MPs ended on 3 July 1962, the day France declared Algeria to be independent.

Following Algerian independence, Deviq attempted to stay in the country to continue operating his business, which he had become the sole owner of following René's death in an accident in 1960. However, after receiving several threats against his life, Deviq fled to France in 1963. The Compagnie Saharienne Automobile was seized by the Algerian government and was renamed the Compagnie Socialiste Automobile; under the leadership of incompetent and corrupt bureaucrats, the company dissolved after only a few years. Deviq became a leader among the Algerian exile community in France, aiding Edmond Jouhaud in the National Committee of the Repatriated and Despoiled, and working in the Rahla, an association of exiles from the Sahara. Deviq died on 17 June 1972 in Paris at the age of 65.
