= Dominique Cerutti =

French businessman (3 January 1961)

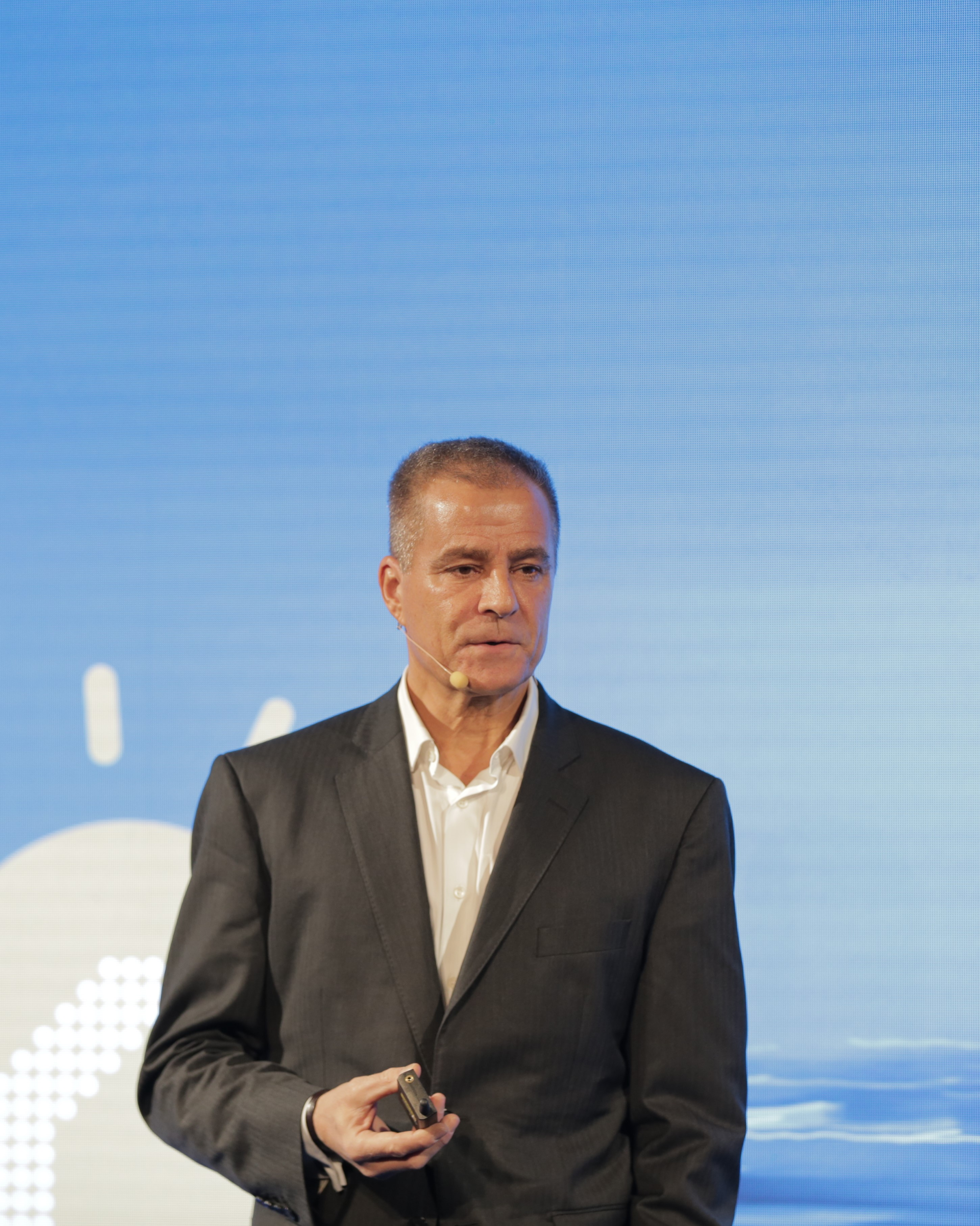
- Born: Dominique Cerutti; 3 January 1961 (age 65)
- Education: ESTP
- Occupations: Chairman and CEO of the Altran group
- Spouse: married
- Children: 2

Dominique Cerutti (born 3 January 1961, in Manosque, France) is a French businessman and was chairman and CEO of the Altran group from June 2015 to December 2020.

== Career ==
=== Early career ===
Cerutti is an engineer and graduate of ESTP. He began his career as an engineer for French company Bouygues Construction in Saudi Arabia, where he was based for nearly two years.

=== IBM ===
He moved to IBM in 1986, starting out in sales engineering and sales management. He remained at IBM for more than 20 years.

At IBM, he was promoted to his first management position in 1996 as the director of the Personal Systems Group for Western Europe.

Over the following decade, Cerutti ascended the ranks of IBM and worked in roles that were particularly international. In 1998, he became executive assistant to the chairman and CEO, Lou Gerstner.

In 2000, he moved to IBM Global Services, the leading market services provider in Europe, first as general manager for Western Europe and then for the whole EMEA region. He managed tens of thousands of employees in 17 different sectors. In 2005, Cerutti became IBM's general manager for Europe, Middle East and Africa.

According to his former IBM colleagues, Cerutti starkly contrasted with the company's generally diffident management style and preferred to clearly outline strategies for his teams.

=== NYSE-Euronext ===
In 2009 Cerutti left IBM to join NYSE Euronext, the global exchange group, as president and deputy CEO. He was also CEO of Euronext NV, the European subsidiary of NYSE Euronext, and chairman and CEO of Euronext Paris. In 2010, he was appointed as a board member of the group. He undertook one of his first notable projects as a member of the board: compliance with the EU's Markets in Financial Instruments Directive. According to him, this directive decreased transparency in financial markets by allowing the creation of alternative exchange platforms at a time when “the need for transparence has never been so acute”.

In November 2013, he moved up from deputy CEO of NYSE to become the CEO of Euronext.

In June 2014, he oversaw Euronext's IPO as an independent company after it separated from parent company ICE. As CEO of Euronext, he turned around the strategy of the group, moving away from the legacy of his predecessor, Jean-François Théodore. In September 2014, he embarked on a program to increase operational savings by €60 million over the next three years, with the goal of achieving a 5% annual revenue growth and improve the company's long-term EBITDA margin from 42% to 53%.

Cerutti has also spoken against the European Commission's proposal of a financial transactions tax, arguing that "the political intention of creating such a tax is a noble one, but the current form of the proposal is counter-productive […] this tax is truly the last thing we need now.“ He has also spoken out in favor of increased market regulation and transparency as the main way of reducing risk.

During his time as CEO, Euronext once again became independent and had an IPO in its own markets. According to Rijnhard Van Tets, president of Euronext's Supervisory Board, "Under his direction, the company was able to successfully re-position itself as the leading independent European stock market."

=== Altran ===
Cerutti has been chairman and CEO of the Altran group since 18 June 2015.

In November 2015, Cerutti announced his five-year strategic plan, "Altran 2020. Ignition." The plan aims for the firm to reach 3 billion euros in revenue in five years and a big increase in profitability. As part of the new strategic plan, Dominique Cerrutti launched a strong acquisition policy, notably with Tessella, an international leader in data analysis and data science consulting, Synapse, an American company specialized in developing innovative products, Lohika, a software engineering company and Benteler Engineering, a German firm specialized in design and engineering services for the automobile industry.

Cerrutti also set up several strategic partnerships, especially in the fields of 3D printing, with Divergent an American startup that integrates 3D printing with automobile manufacturing, and autonomous driving with EMG (eMApgo) a Chinese company specialized in digital mapping for the automobile industry.

In 2017, he led Altran's acquisition of Information Risk Management (IRM), a UK-based company specialised in cyber security, as well as GlobalEdge, an India-based software solutions firm specialised in IoT systems and embedded software solutions.

In November 2017, under the leadership of Cerruti, Altran Group also purchased the company Aricent for $2.0 billion, which is to date, the group's largest acquisition. This move enabled “Altran 2020. Ignition” strategic plan to achieve its goals two years ahead of schedule and established the company as a world leader in engineering, research and development services. Under Cerutti, Altran published revenues for the year 2017 indicating a 10% increase in sales, as well as a current operating income up by 13.6% that year; an increased revenue margin of 10.8%.

In June 2018, Cerutti announced the plan "The High Road, Altran 2022". This plan ambitions a 14.5% margin and a 4 billion euros turnover in 2022 by betting on technological breakthroughs.

In December 2020, he stepped down as CEO of Altran.

Since March 2021, Cerutti has been chairman of Adarma’s Board, and since 1 July 2021, he has been a Group Board Member at IDEMIA Group.

== Honours and awards ==
The French weekly news magazine, Option Finance, named Cerutti in its ranking of the top 50 newsmakers of 2014.

== Personal life ==
Cerutti is married and the father of two children. He is passionate about jogging and diving.
