= Exotel Techcom =

- Industry: Cloud communications, SaaS
- Founded: July 2011; 15 years ago
- Founders: Shivakumar Ganesan; Ishwar Sridharan; Siddharth Ramesh
- Headquarters: Bengaluru, Karnataka, India
- Key people: Shivakumar Ganesan (Co-founder & CEO); Sachin Bhatia (Co-founder & CGO); Ananda Kumar (CFO); Gaurav Agrawal (CBO); Rohan Shanbhag (COO); Sanjeeth R. (CPO)
- Website: exotel.com

Exotel Techcom Private Limited, operating as Exotel, is an Indian cloud communications and CPaaS company headquartered in Bengaluru, Karnataka Founded in 2011, the company provides cloud-based voice-over-Internet protocol (VoIP), interactive voice response (IVR), virtual contact center software, and conversational AI tools.

== History ==
=== Founding and early years (2011–2015) ===
Exotel was founded in July 2011 by Shivakumar Ganesan, Ishwar Sridharan, and Siddharth Ramesh. The initial product was built after Ganesan developed an automated cloud telephony tool for his previous venture, Roopit, a consumer to consumer (C2C) marketplace. In March 2012, Exotel raised ₹2.5 cror (approx. US$500,000) in seed funding from Mumbai Angels and Blume Ventures. Following its seed round, the company operated without additional equity capital for eight years, funding operations primarily through operating revenue. In May 2013, Exotel launched a beta version of its developer API platform to enable third-party applications.

Following regulatory policy changes introduced by the Telecom Regulatory Authority of India (TRAI) in 2014, company expanded its services to target enterprise customers alongside small and medium-sized enterprises. In February 2015, Exotel acquired Singapore-based voice-recognition startup Croak.it to integrate voice-clip technology into its platform.

=== Expansion and acquisitions (2017–present) ===
In 2017, Exotel acquired customer feedback startup Voyce. In late 2020, the company raised US$5.4 million in a Series B funding round led by A91 Partners.

Exotel merged with Gurugram-based contact center platform Ameyo in June 2021 in a cash-and-stock transaction. Later that year, in September 2021, the company raised US$35 million in Series C funding. In November 2021, Exotel acquired conversational AI firm Cogno AI to integrate chatbot and co-browsing features into its platform.

In January 2022, the company raised US$40 million in a Series D round led by Steadview Capital, alongside expanding its operations into Southeast Asia and the Middle East. In November 2022, Exotel received a pan-India Unified Licence for Virtual Network Operator (VNO) Access from the Department of Telecommunications (DoT), enabling it to deliver cloud-based voice services in partnership with Indian telecom operators. In April 2026, Exotel acqui-hired the leadership team of voice AI startup Dubverse, including co-founders Anuja Dhawan and Varshul Gupta.

== Platform ==
Exotel operates a cloud communications platform providing cloud telephony, virtual contact center software, and conversational AI tools. The platform includes number masking, which routes phone calls through proxy servers to connect parties without disclosing personal telephone numbers. The platform uses application programming interfaces (APIs) to integrate interactive voice response (IVR) systems, automated chatbots, and web-based support across voice, messaging, and video channels.

== Awards and recognition ==
- 2022: Received the Comeback Kid award at The Economic Times Startup Awards.
