= Aricent =

Former company

Aricent/Altran Americas
- Company type: Defunct Company (acquired by Altran)
- Industry: R&D Services
- Founded: 1985 (founding of Future Software Communications); 1991 (founding of Hughes Software Systems); merged after acquisition in 2004.
- Defunct: 2019
- Headquarters: Santa Clara, California and later New York, New York (USA); Gurgaon, Haryana (India)
- Products: Product and service engineering (largely digital and software products and services)
- Number of employees: 10,000

Aricent was a global design and engineering services company. It was acquired by French-based company Altran in 2018 and renamed Altran North America in April 2019 and Altran Americas in early 2020. With Altran's acquisition by Capgemini, the successors of Aricent are incorporated into Capgemini Engineering and to a lesser extent, Capgemini Invent.

Aricent was best known for developing telecom software which is used by telecom giants such as Cisco Systems, Juniper Networks, Nokia Networks, Oracle, Alcatel-Lucent Enterprise, and Nortel.

== History ==
Aricent is the successor to Hughes Software Systems, which was established in 1991, as a subsidiary of Hughes Electronics, with funding from Sequoia Capital.

- 1985: Future Software Communications founded by KV Ramani, a TCP/IP stack developer from India which will eventually merge with Hughes Software Systems.
- 1991: Hughes Software Systems (HSS) founded by KV Ramani in Nehru Place, New Delhi to develop software solutions in the areas of VSAT-based networks for voice and data, cellular wireless telephony, packet switching, and multi-protocol routing. Pioneered the development of Protocol Stacks.
- 2004: Flextronics bought HSS to form Flextronics Software Systems and merged with Future Software headquartered. Acquired Frog Design for approximately $25 million.
- 2005: Expanded development operations in Kyiv, Kherson and Vinnytsia in Ukraine; Randburg, South Africa; and Beijing, China. Was delisted from India's stock market in preparation for sale.
- 2006: Was acquired by Kohlberg Kravis Roberts and Sequoia Capital as part of a $900 million sales of software companies. The transaction represented the largest private equity buy-out in Indian history.
- 2007: Acquired Datalinx; launched service provider offerings.
- 2008: The Family Office, a multi-family office company with headquarters in Bahrain also joined in funding Aricent.
- 2011: Rebranded to Aricent Group.
- 2011: Opened engineering and development center for testing and wireless technologies in Vietnam
- 2013: Rebranded to Aricent.
- 2015: Acquired SmartPlay Technologies, a semiconductor service based firm for $180 million. As part of the deal, SmartPlay's 1,200-plus staff joined Aricent's staff.
- 2018: Altran acquired Aricent, with Aricent operating as Altran North America in the Americas;
- 2019: Capgemini announced plans to acquire Altran Group
- 2020: Capgemini acquired Altran Group in April, with the majority of Altran staff (including most former Aricent employees) incorporated into Capgemini Engineering. Frog incorporated into Capgemini Invent.

== See also ==
- Centre for Development of Telematics
- Fortune India 500
- Frog Design
- List of companies of India
- Tanla Platforms
- Route Mobile
