= Phonon (disambiguation) =

A phonon is a quasiparticle of mechanical vibrations.

It may also refer to:

- Phonon (software)
- Phonon (company)
