= Bocșa (disambiguation) =

Bocşa may refer to several places:

In Romania:

- Bocșa, a town in Caraș-Severin County
- Bocșa, a commune in Sălaj County
- Bocșa, a village in Măciuca Commune, Vâlcea County
- Bocșa Mare and Bocșa Mică, villages in Certeju de Sus Commune, Hunedoara County

In Moldova:

- Bocșa, a village in Risipeni Commune, Fălești District

== See also ==
- Bócsa
