= Léon Eyrolles =

French politician

Mayor of Cachan
- In office 1929–1944

Personal details
- Born: 14 December 1861 Tulle, France
- Died: 3 December 1945 (aged 83) Cachan, France
- Education: École nationale des ponts et chaussées
- Profession: Entrepreneur

Léon Eyrolles (14 December 1861 – 3 December 1945) was a French politician and entrepreneur. In 1891, he created the first École Spéciale des Travaux Publics and later a correspondence school.

Eyrolles developed his educational skills as he helped fellow site managers to pass a civil servant selective exams. In 1902, he bought a large piece of land to extend the school and in 1924 he became the mayor of the newly founded city of Cachan, which was split from the city of Arcueil.
