= Tanla Platforms =

Indian technology company

- Formerly: Tanla Solutions
- Company type: Public
- Traded as: NSE: TANLA; BSE: 532790
- ISIN: INE483C01032
- Industry: Telecommunications
- Founded: May 1999; 27 years ago
- Founder: D. Uday Kumar Reddy
- Headquarters: Hyderabad, India
- Area served: Worldwide
- Revenue: ▲₹3,927 crore (US$410 million) (FY24)
- Operating income: ▲₹759 crore (US$79 million) (FY24)
- Net income: ▲₹554 crore (US$58 million) (FY24)
- Number of employees: 638 (2022)
- Website: tanla.com

Tanla Platforms Ltd, previously known as Tanla Solutions Ltd, is an Indian multinational communications platform as a service (CPaaS) company based in Hyderabad. The company provides value-added services in the cloud communications space. Tanla has more than 600 employees across its offices, including two overseas locations–Singapore and Dubai. The company is listed on BSE and NSE in India.

== History ==
Tanla was founded by Dasari Uday Kumar Reddy in May 1999 during the dot-com bubble.

In December 2006, Tanla was listed on BSE and NSE after its initial public offering.

Tanla acquired Finland-based mobile payments company OpenBit Oy (now called Tanla Oy) in 2008. In June 2008, Tanla picked up 85% in the company, followed by an acquisition of 5% in June 2009 and the remaining 10% in April 2010.

Tanla Platforms, in August 2018, acquired 100% of Karix Mobile (formerly known as mGage India) and its wholly owned subsidiary Unicel from GSO Capital Partners, a Blackstone company, at an enterprise value of ₹340 crore. The closure of this acquisition was announced in April 2019.

In 2023, Tanla acquired 100% stake in ValueFirst Group from Twilio for $42 million (₹346 crore).

== Services ==
Tanla Platforms Limited initially started as a Bulk SMS provider in Hyderabad catering to SME. As the team grew, the company evolved into a Cloud communication provider with services and products with aggregators and Telcos across the globe.
