= Missions Berliet-Ténéré =

The Mission Berliet Ténéré and the subsequent Mission Berliet Tchad were two trans-Sahara expeditions organised by the French truck manufacturer, Berliet. The expeditions demonstrated the ability of Berliet trucks to cross long stretches of desert and wilderness, and also supported geographical and scientific research.

== Expeditions ==
The first expedition set out from Ouargla in November 1959, heading south into the Sahara for Djanet, past Adrar Bous and resupply in Agadez. It then visited the Arbre du Ténéré and the Termit Massif before continuing to Lake Chad and Fort Lamy (present-day N'Djamena). The return route followed a challenging passage from Lake Chad north via Agadem to the oasis of Bilma, the ruins of Djado as well as an excursion to the prehistoric rock art sites in the remote valley of Enneri Blaka, before returning to Djanet and Ouargla in January 1960. Crossing the Erg of Bilma north of Agadem was a particular challenge. The expedition covered 10,000 km in 50 days.

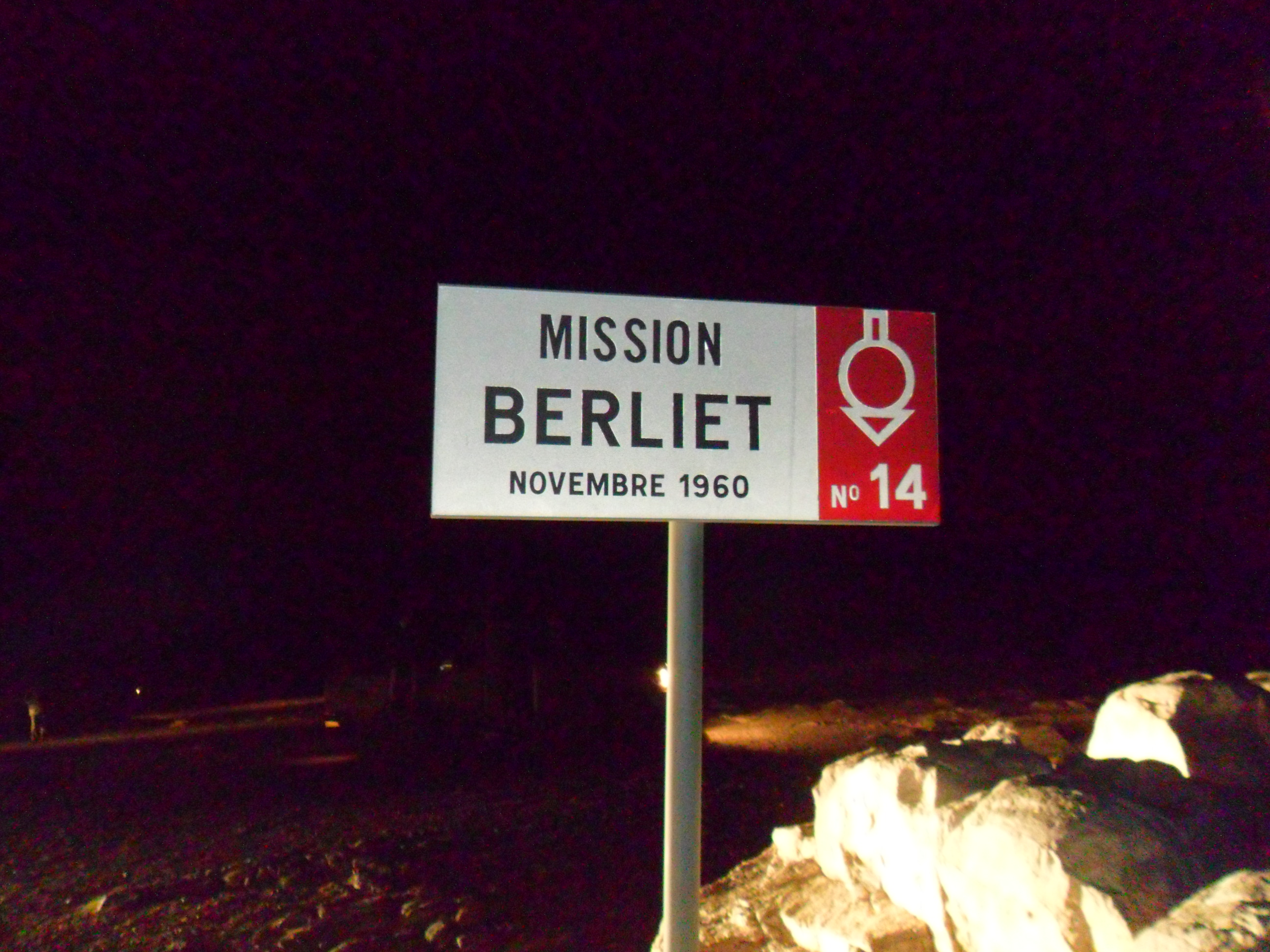
A picture of Berliet Balise n° 14, which was replaced in 2005 with an identical sign.

A second expedition set off from Ouargla in October 1960, before taking a new, more easterly route via Séguedine and south of the Djado Plateau towards Zouar in the Tibesti and Faya Largeau. This route sought to avoid the difficult dunes of the eastern Bilma Erg, making it more practical for conventional, RWD trucks. The expedition reached Fort Lamy in November 1960 and returned to Djanet in December, travelling via Adrar Bous on the edge of the Aïr Mountains. On the way back, from near Zouar in north-western Chad, across the northern Ténéré to Adrar Bous and up to Mount Tiska, close to Djanet, 22 Berliet-branded 'balises' or marker posts were erected. Their positions feature on the current Michelin 741 map of North West Africa, and some still survive today in the Ténéré.

As well as drivers and mechanics, the expeditions included scientists researching local biology, geology, archaeology and ethnography. The first expedition also included a substantial press corps. Research uncovered evidence of early human settlement dating back to around 3200 BCE, in areas that are now arid desert. Artefacts included stone tools and pottery.

== Vehicles ==
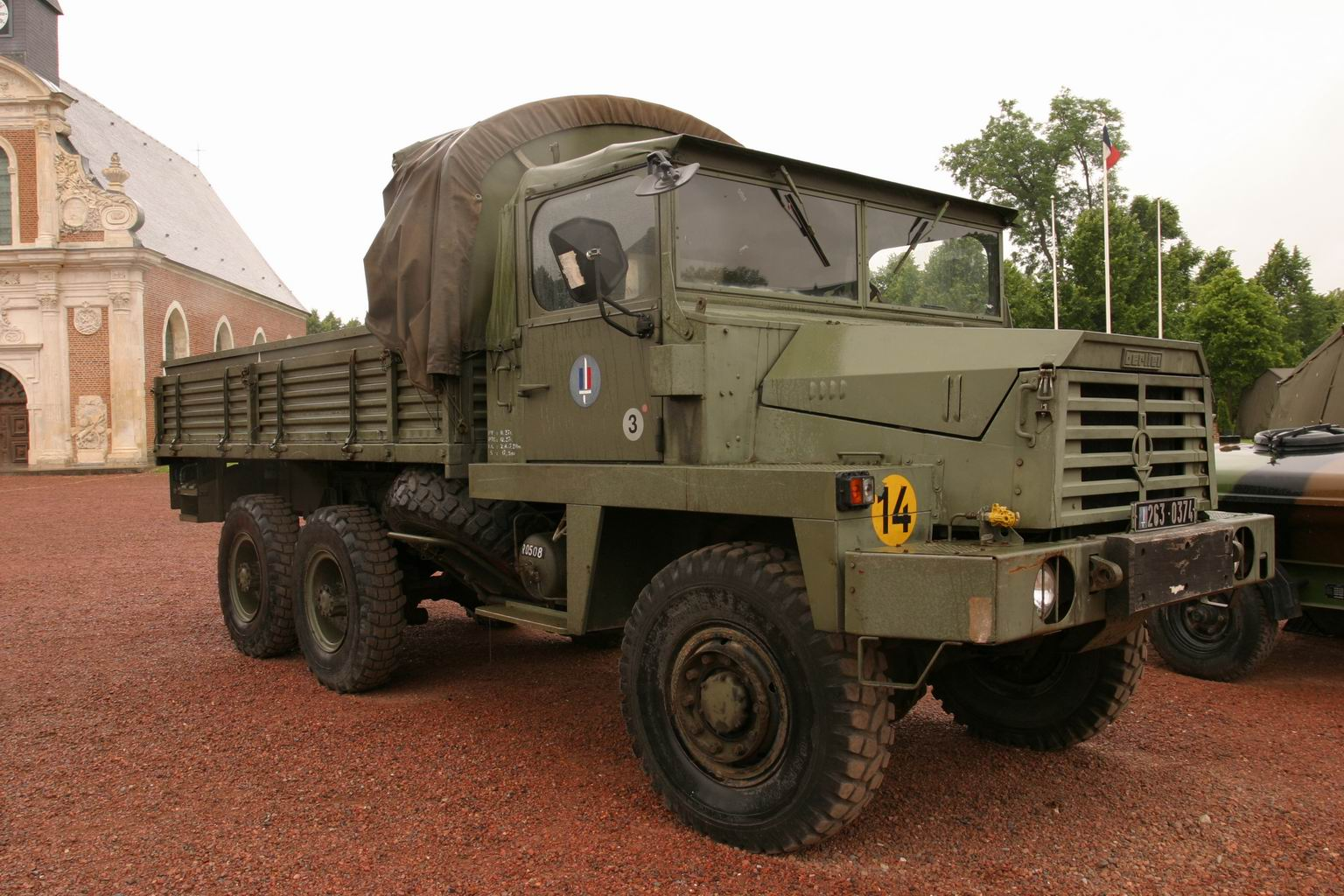
A Berliet GBC truck, with a military cab instead of the civilian version used for the expedition.

The core of the Ténéré expedition was a fleet of nine Berliet GBC8 6WD trucks nicknamed "Gazelle". The trucks had been designed for use in desert conditions such as the oilfields of Algeria and were first tested in 1957 in the dunes of Ermenonville, near Paris. The trucks had 7.9 litre, 125 hp engines. Four Series II Land Rovers accompanied the trucks, as well as a Bell helicopter. As well as helping with dune navigation, a Bell helicopter was able to shoot spectacular aerial footage of the vehicles in action as well as hitherto unseen corners of the Sahara. In 2015 the Fondation Berliet released a full-colour, 52-minute DVD.

In addition to most of the above vehicles, the second expedition used four Berliet GLM 10 M HC trucks - a more conventional rear-wheel-drive cargo truck. Each carried 11 tons of cargo.

== See also ==
- Berliet T100
- Trans-Sahara Highway
- Croisière des Sables Expeditions
