= Tessella =

International analytics and data science consulting services company

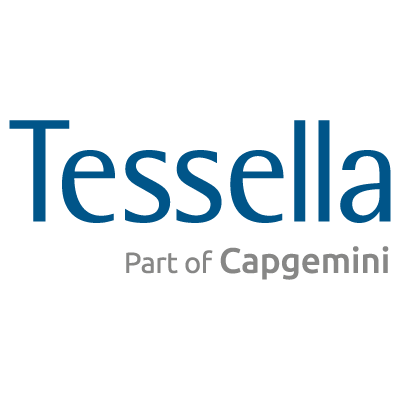
- Company type: Part of Capgemini
- Industry: Software science, engineering
- Founded: Oxfordshire, England (1980)
- Headquarters: Abingdon-on-Thames, United Kingdom
- Key people: Kevin Gell, Founder; Andy Vickers, Chief Executive Officer
- Website: capgemini-engineering.com

Tessella was an international analytics and data science consulting services company owned by Capgemini. It is now the Hybrid Intelligence team, within Capgemini Engineering.

== History ==
Tessella was founded in 1980 by Kevin Gell. Tessella moved to its first permanent office in Abingdon, Oxfordshire, in 1987. Tessella established a United States operations in 2004 in Newton, Massachusetts. Tessella purchased Analyticon, a technical consultancy in the space and defence industries, in 2005. In 2009 Tessella expanded its services to include consulting. In July 2012 Tessella existing management team completed a management buy out. Mobeus Equity Partners supported the buyout and founder Kevin Gell retained a significant minority stake and continued to serve as a board member. After the MBO, Tessella expanded its consulting and technology services to explicitly include analytics as a core capability. In December 2015 Altran acquired Tessella. In April 2020 Capgemini acquired Altran and Tessella became part of Capgemini Engineering. On 1 April 2022, Tessella ceased to be its own legal entity and is now fully integrated within Capgemini Engineering as the Hybrid Intelligence team.

== Awards and honours ==
- 2015 UK IT Awards Highly Commended in the Not for Profit category
- 2014 UK IT Awards Innovative Mobile App of the Year
- 2014 Bio-IT World Best Practices Award
- 2013 European Rail Congress Awards
- 2011 The National Archives and Tessella win the Queen's Award for Enterprise Innovation
- 2009 Bio-IT World Best Practices Award
- 2012-17 Best Places to Work Ranks Tessella as Outstanding
