= Ginette Hamelin =

French engineer and architect, member of the French resistance

- Born: Ginette Sylvere; 4 March 1913; Clermont-Ferrand, France
- Died: 14 October 1944 (aged 31); Ravensbrück concentration camp, Nazi Germany
- Other names: Ginette Sylvere-Hamelin; Ginette Hamelin-Sylvere

Ginette Hamelin (4 March 1913 – 14 October 1944) was a French engineer and architect who became a member of the French Resistance and an intelligence officer in World War II. She was murdered in a concentration camp in 1944.

== Biography ==
Hamelin was born Ginette Sylvere in Clermont-Ferrand, Puy-de-Dôme, France on 4 March 1913. Her father was Major Antoine Sylvère. He led a major maquis group in the southwest. Her sister was the singer Jany Sylvaire. Hamelin studied engineering and architecture in the School of Public Works where she was the first woman to graduate in that field. She married N. Hamelin, brother-in-law of the future Prime Minister Jacques Chaban-Delmas. In 1934 Hamelin became a member of the Communist youth.

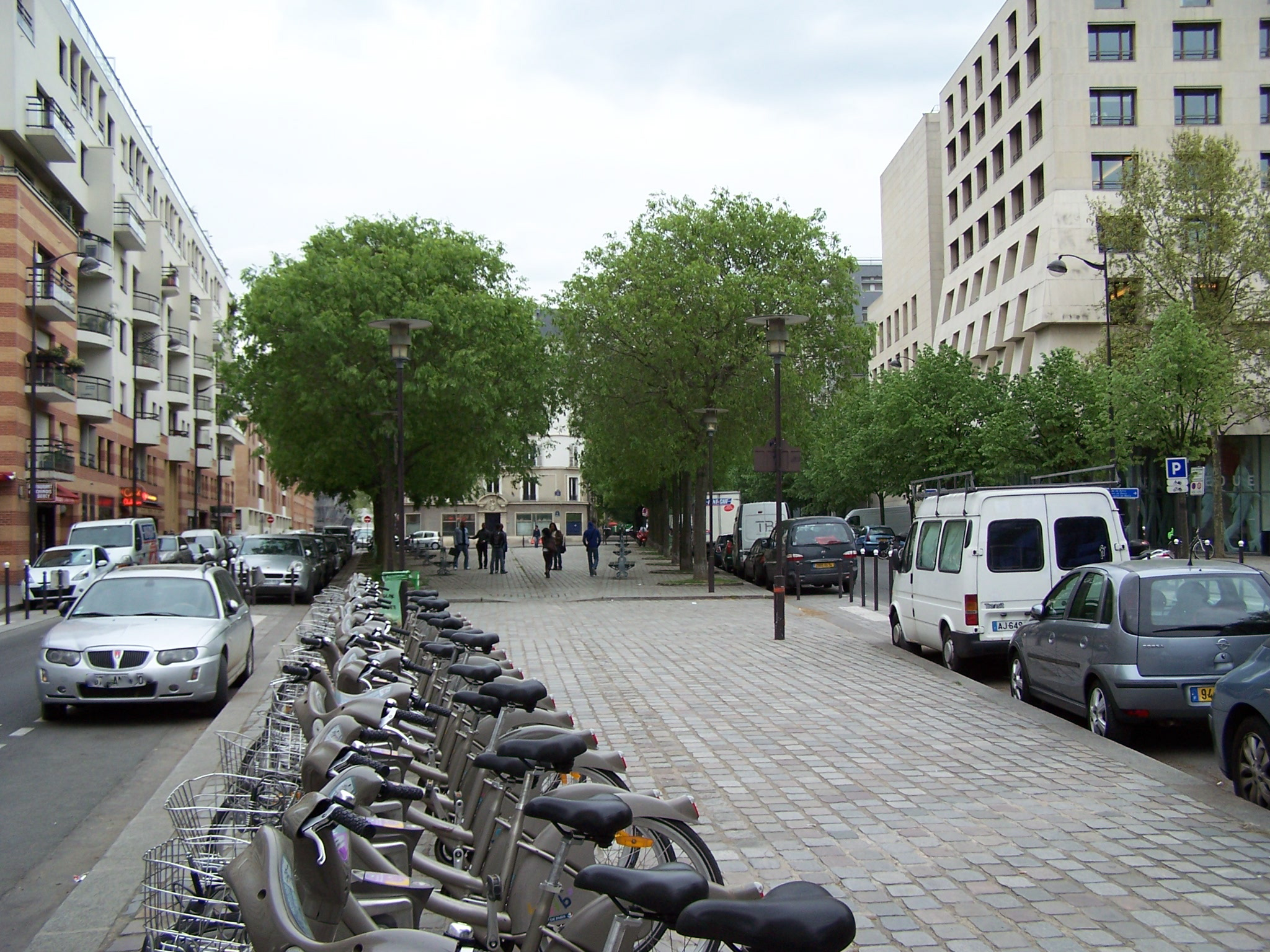
Place Ginette~~-~~Hamelin

Hamelin's husband was killed in 1940 and she joined the Resistance in 1941. She was part of the National Front for the Liberation and Independence of France with her sister. They fought with André Debon. Hamelin joined the Snipers and Partisans where she became a second lieutenant and also head of an intelligence service. On 13 April 1943 Hamelin was arrested and sent to Romainville. From there she was deported to Ravensbrück concentration camp on 29 August. She was killed there on 14 October 1944.

== Recognition ==
Her name is inscribed on the war memorials of Joigny and Auxerre. There is a square named after her in the 12th district of Paris since 2003.
