= Jeanne Scelles-Millie =

French engineer and architect

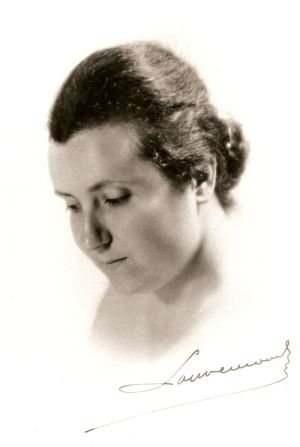
- Born: Jeanne Millie; 12 September 1900; Algiers, French North Africa
- Died: 22 March 1993 (aged 92); Saint-Maurice, Val-de-Marne, France
- Occupation: Architectural engineer

Jeanne Scelles-Millie (12 September 1900 – 22 March 1993) was a French architectural engineer and author who was born in Algeria and lived there until it gained independence from France. She was interested in inter-faith dialog between Christians, Jews and Muslims. She published several collections of North African folk tales and legends. She and her husband Jean Scelles were active in fighting prostitution.

== Life ==
Jeanne Millie was born in Algiers on 12 September 1900 to a French family. She saw herself as a "woman from both shores". In 1924 she was the first woman to obtain a diploma at the École Spéciale des Travaux Publics (ESTP) in Paris, and the first female architectural engineer in France. She was the first woman to direct construction sites in Algeria. She married Jean Baptiste Scelles (born 1904).

Jean and Jeanne Scelles-Millies was well known in sillonniste circles. The progressive Catholic couple founded the Union of Monotheistic Believers in 1934 to bring Muslims, Christians and Jews together, with sheikh Tayeb el Ogbi, an Islamic scholar who founded the AUMA along with Ibn Badis and the Jewish activist Elie Gozlan. This group held weekly discussions about religious issues between Muslims, Jews and Christians. In the summer of 1935, Jeanne and Jean helped arrange for the Abbé Jules Monchanin, a member of the Société lyonnaise de philosophie, to meet the influential el Ogbi. (Note: Tayeb el-Oqbi or Tayeb El-Okbi (Arabic: الطيب العقبي), a politically moderate Islamic reformer)

Two years later the Scelles-Millies couple introduced Monchanin to professor Louis Massignon.

Jeanne Scelles-Millie helped fight for the social, cultural and political liberation of the Algerians. She founded Franco-Muslim schools. During World War II (1939–45) she participated in the French Resistance in Algeria and then in metropolitan France. Jean Scelles was imprisoned as a member of the Resistance in 1941 in Algiers. He learned about prostitution from a cellmate, a pimp, and he and his wife decided to devote themselves to defending human dignity through public awareness campaigns and pressure on politicians to suppress trafficking, while recognizing that the client was the true cause of prostitution.

Jeanne Scelles-Millie finally moved to France in 1957. She published several collections of North African folk tales and legends. She died in Saint-Maurice, Val-de-Marne, on 22 March 1993. Jean and Jeanne Scelles created the Fondation Scelles in 1993, and left it all their property. The foundation, which fights sexual exploitation, was recognized as a public utility in 1994.

== Writings ==
Scelles-Millie's Contes sahariens du Souf, !1964) is a collection of tales by Arab storytellers from the Kabylie on the borders of the Sahara. Some of the stories are intended for children, and were related by youths aged 15 or 16. The stories are accompanied by notes and comments, and a glossary.

Les Quatrains de Medjdoub le Sarcastique (1966) is a collection of 340 quatrains by Medjdoub, some from previous collections. It includes over 100 quatrains provided orally by the Khelifa family of Algiers which had not previously been published. The work includes a description of the poet's life, the times when he wrote and his views on morals, religion and women. The quatrains are presented in the original and in translation, with notes and comments. A scathing review by John Wansbrough began " If this book was meant to be a serious study of a genre of North African colloquial literature its compilers have failed... The information ... is reproduced in a most bewildering manner, strewn copiously with errors of fact and of interpretation."

Her 1970 Contes arabes du Maghreb is a collection of 45 stories told to her either in Arabic or in French by five story tellers from Morocco, Algeria and Tunisia, with each story followed by erudite comments. The stories are from the Arab rather than the Berber tradition. Since all the tellers are educated scholars, the stories show the influence of written Arabic traditions. The work has been criticized for the literary pretensions of the translation and failure to provide the original texts, but has value as a source of new ethnological material.

The Contes mystérieux d'Afrique du Nord, published in 1972 and republished in 2002, is a collection of North African allegorical tales from pious or maraboutic families, or families of magistrates or farmers. Notes after each tale discuss other tales with similar themes. The posthumously published Algerie, dialogue entre christianisme et islam (2003) tells of her motives and convictions in supporting the Algerian struggle for social, cultural and political freedom.

== Publications ==
- Jeanne Scelles-Millie (1964), J. Scelles-Millie. Contes sahariens du Souf, Paris: G.-P. Maisonneuve et Larose (Château-Gontier, Impr. de "l'Indépendant"), p. 340
- Abd al-Rahman al-Majdhub (1500s) (1966), Les quatrains du Medjdoub le sarcastique, poète maghrébin du XVIeme siècle, collected and translated by Jeanne Scelles-Millie and Boukhari Khelifa, Paris: G.-P. Maisonneuve et Larose, p. 195
- Jeanne Scelles-Millie (1970), Contes arabes du Maghreb (documentary collection of folklore), Paris: G.-P. Maisonneuve et Larose, p. 339
- Jean Scelles; J. Scelles-Millie (1970), "Un retour a Dieu par l'Islam: L. Massignon", in Jean-Francois Six ( (ed.), Louis Massignon, Paris
- Jeanne Scelles-Millie, ed. (1972), Contes mystérieux d'Afrique du Nord, Paris: G.P. Maisonneuve et Larose, p. 251
- Jeanne Scelles-Millie, ed. (1973), Légende dorée d'Afrique du Nord, engravings by Clotilde Pasquier-Bronde, Noël Pasquier-Bronde, Paris: G.-P. Maisonneuve et Larose, p. 216
- Jeanne Scelles-Millie (1979), Traditions algériennes, illustrations by Clotilde Pasquier-Bronde, Noël Pasquier-Bronde, Paris: G.-P. Maisonneuve et Larose, p. 301
- Jeanne Scelles-Millie, ed. (1982), Paraboles et contes d'Afrique du Nord, Paris: G. P. Maisonneuve et Larose, p. 170, ISBN 978-2-7068-0822-7
- Jeanne Scelles-Millie, ed. (2002), Contes mystérieux d'Afrique du Nord, illustrations by Clotilde Pasquier-Bronde, Noël Pasquier-Bronde, Paris: Maisonneuve et Larose, p. 248
- Jeanne Scelles-Millie (2003), Fondation Scelles (ed.), Algérie, dialogue entre christianisme et islam : mémoires et notes, 1900-1974, Paris: l'Harmattan, p. 181

== Sources ==
- Algerie, dialogue entre christianisme et islam; mémoires et notes; 1900 a 1974 Jeanne Scelles-Millie (in French), chapitre.com
- Bellamy, James A. (October–December 1971), "Review: Les Quatrains de Medjdoub le Sarcastique by J. Scelles-Millie", Journal of the American Oriental Society, 91 (4), American Oriental Society, doi:10.2307/598523, JSTOR 598523
- Contes mystérieux d'Afrique du Nord / Jeanne Scelles-Millie; gravures de Clotilde et Noël Pasquier-Bronde (in French), Bibliothèques municipales de Grenoble
- Gaudeul, Christophe, "Jean Baptiste SCELLES", Geneanet (in French)
- Historique (in French), Fondation Scelles
- Jeanne Scelles-Millie (1900-1993): nom d'alliance (in French), BnF: Bibliotheque nationale de France
- Keryell, Jacques (1997), Louis Massignon et ses contemporains, KARTHALA Editions, ISBN 978-2-86537-736-7
- Massignon, Geneviève (January–March 1965), "Review: Contes sahariens du Souf by J. SCELLES-MILLIE", Arts et Traditions Populaires (in French), Year 13 (1), Presses Universitaires de France, JSTOR 41001303
- Smith, Pierre (1971), "J. Scelles-Millie, Contes arabes du Maghreb [compte-rendu]", L'Homme (in French), 11 (3)
- Wansbrough, J. (1967), "Review: Les quatrains de Medjdoub le sarcastique, poète maghrébin du XVIe siècle by J. Scelles-Millie, Boukhari Khelifa", Bulletin of the School of Oriental and African Studies, University of London, 30 (3, Fiftieth Anniversary Volume), Cambridge University Press on behalf of School of Oriental and African Studies, doi:10.1017/S0041977X00132239, JSTOR 612406, S2CID 161556263
- Zegoubi, H., Scientifiques françaises décédées notoirement connues, mathématiciennes, physiciennes, chimistes, médecins (in French), Université Toulouse III - Paul Sabatier
