= École Spéciale des Travaux Publics =

French engineering graduate school

Coordinates: 48°51′1″N 2°20′48″E

ESTP
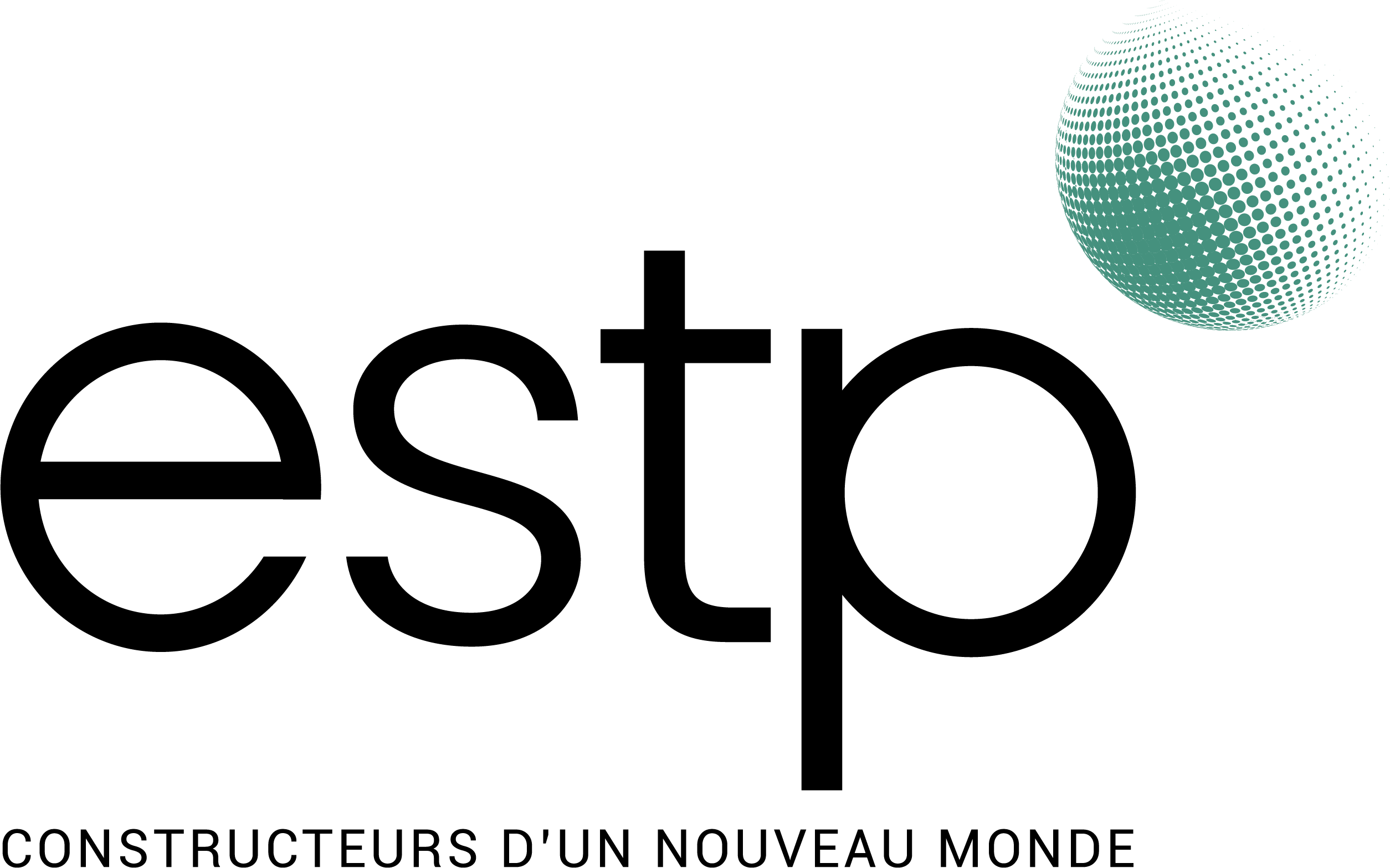
- Motto: Constructeurs d'un nouveau monde
- Motto in English: Constructors of a new world
- Type: Grande École d'ingénieurs
- Established: 1891
- Founders: Léon Eyrolles
- Affiliations: CDEFI, CGE, UGEI
- President: Hervé Le Bouc
- Director: Joël Cuny
- Location: Cachan, France
- Website: ESTP Website
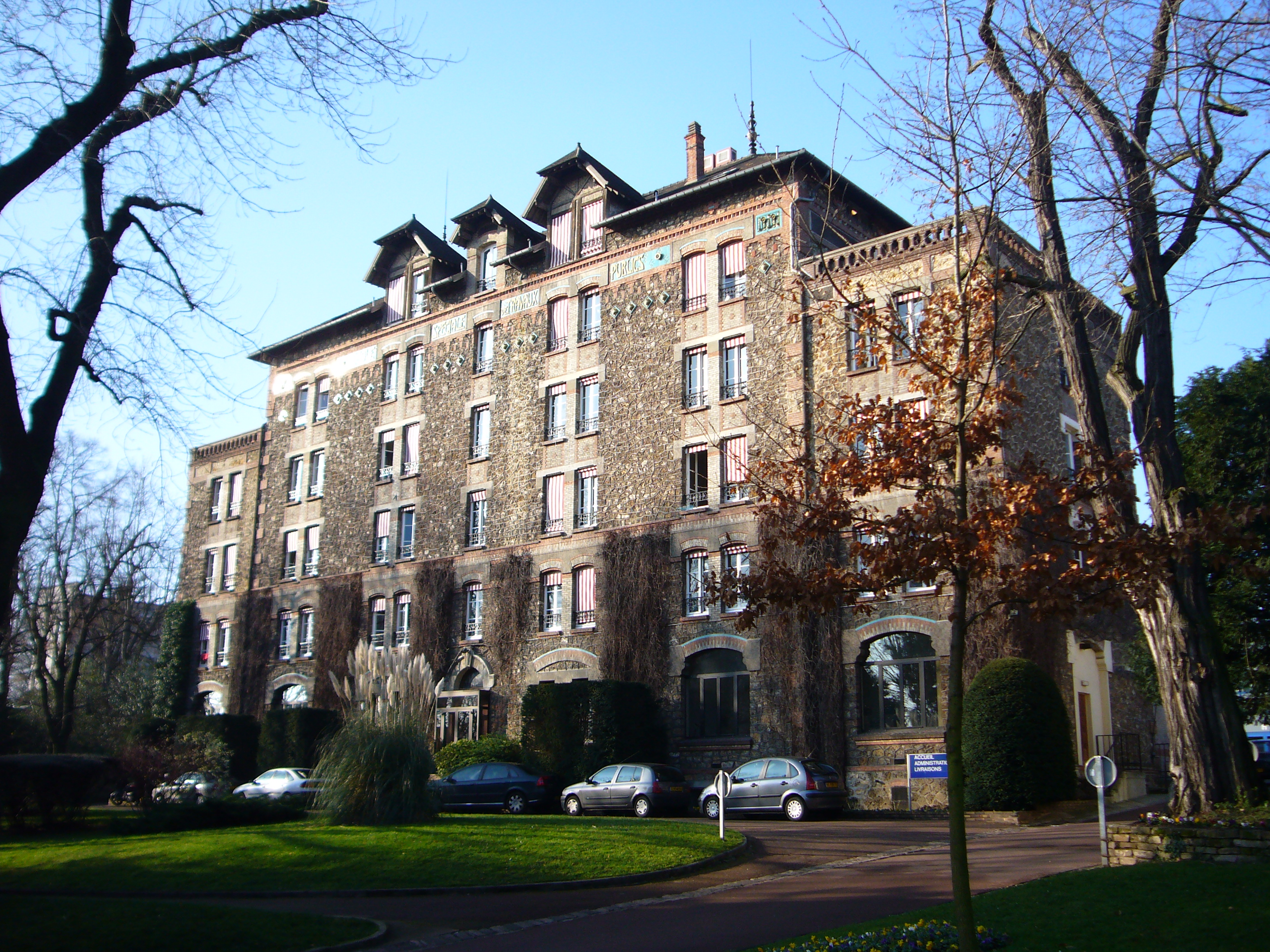

École Spéciale des Travaux Publics, du bâtiment et de l'industrie (ESTP) is a French engineering school and grande école located in Cachan.

== History ==
ESTP was founded in 1891 by Léon Eyrolles and was officially recognized by the State in 1921. It is a general engineering school recognized for leading French higher education in the fields of construction and project management. ESTP Paris is the most prestigious Civil Engineering school in France. It has trained a total of 24,000 engineers and 7,000 construction site managers. The school has also educated since 1891 site managers in building and public works in an undergraduate program. In 1999 the school formed a partnership with Arts et Métiers ParisTech to offer a double-degree program. It offers a multitude of doube-degree programs with various universities around the world.

== Courses ==
The institution offers courses in building engineering, civil engineering, topography, surveying, electrical engineering granting diplomas and degrees for two- and three-year courses. The college was partly located on Boulevard Saint-Germain, in what has since become New York University's Paris campus, but entirely moved to Cachan, in the southern suburbs of Paris. The college is open to English-speakers who want to study engineering in conjunction with French.

== Alumni ==
Notable alumni include:

- Patrick Bernasconi (born 1955), French business executive
- Dominique Cerutti (born 1961), French businessman
- Marcel Deviq (1907–1972), French engineer, businessman, and politician
- Léon Eyrolles (1861–1945), French politician and entrepreneur, founder of the first ESTP
- Menachem Mendel Schneerson (1902–1994), last rebbe of the Lubavitch Hasidic dynasty, philosopher, theologian, engineer, educator and writer
- Moshé Feldenkrais (1904–84), Israeli engineer
- Marc de Garidel, French businessman
- Nicolas Grunitzky (1913–69), second president of Togo
- Roger Guérillot (1904–71), French colonist of Ubangi-Shari
- Ginette Hamelin (4 March 1913 – 14 October 1944), French engineer and architect; member of the French resistance; killed in a concentration camp
- Saad Hassar (born 1953), Moroccan politician
- Bruno Itoua (born 1956), Congolese politician
- Harold Martin (born 1954), New Caledonian politician
- Guillaume Sarkozy, French entrepreneur
- Amin Cherifi, French engineer involved in Grand Paris Express
- Jeanne Scelles-Millie (1900–93), French architectural engineer and author
- Gilles Tonelli (born 1957), Monegasque engineer, diplomat and politician
