= Marc de Garidel =

French businessman (born 1956)

- Born: 1956 (age 69–70); Aix-en-Provence, France
- Education: École Spéciale des Travaux Publics; Thunderbird School of Global Management; Harvard Business School
- Occupation: Businessman
- Known for: Former CEO, Ipsen (2010-16)
- Title: CEO Abivax
- Term: 2023-
- Honours: Knight Legion of Honour (2008)

Marc de Garidel is a French Biotech Entrepreneur. He is the CEO of Abivax, a French clinical-stage, publicly traded biotechnology company (ABVX at Euronext Paris and Nasdaq Global Market), which he joined in May 2023.

He is also the non-executive chairman of the pharmaceutical company Ipsen since 2010. He is on the board of Claris Bio, a Harvard Ophthalmology spin-off.

== Education ==
Marc de Garidel has a degree in Civil Engineering from the Ecole des Travaux Publics in Paris, has a Master's in International Management (MIM) from Thunderbird Global School Management in Glendale, Arizona, US, and an executive MBA from Harvard Business School in Boston, Boston, Massachusetts.

== Career ==
In 1983, he started his career at Eli Lilly and Company, where he worked in France, the United States and Germany.

In 1995, he joined Amgen as vice president of finance and treasury for Europe. In 1998, he became vice president, corporate controller and chief accounting officer of Amgen. In 2000, he became vice president and general manager for France, in charge of Amgen France. In 2006, he became vice president for Southwestern Europe, including France, Spain, Belgium and Portugal. From 2007 to 2010, he served as vice president for Southern Europe, the Middle East, Asia and Latin America at Amgen.

He was chairman and chief executive officer of Ipsen from November 2010 to July 2016.

He was also president and spokesperson for G5 santé, a lobbying group for French pharmaceutical companies, including BioMérieux, Guerbet, Ipsen, the Laboratoire français du Fractionnement et des Biotechnologies, Laboratoires Pierre Fabre, Sanofi, Stallergenes and Laboratoires Théa.

In early 2018, de Garidel joined Corvidia Therapeutics, a biotech company based in Waltham, Massachusetts. In April 2018, he raised a $60M series B round led by Venrock and other top-tier US and European venture capital funds. In June 2020, after its lead asset, Ziltivekimab, was near completion of its phase 2b program, the company was acquired for $2.1B, including an upfront of $725M by Novo Nordisk in one of the largest transaction of the biotech sector in the midst of the Covid-19 pandemic.

From July 2021 through February 2023, de Garidel served as CEO of CinCor Pharma where he led the successful sale of the company for up to $1.8B, subject to the achievement of certain milestones, to AstraZeneca in February 2023.

== Distinctions ==
- France: Knight of the Legion of Honour (2008)

== Bibliography ==
- La Société du Médicament (2006)
