= Thierry Beaudet =

French mutualist manager, president of the French Economic (born 1962)

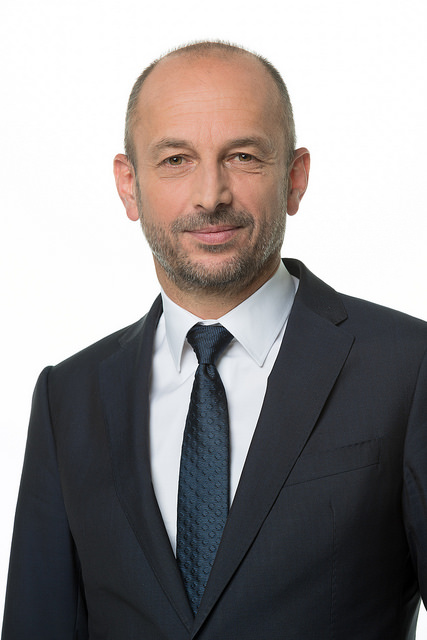
- Beaudet in 2017

President of the Economic, Social and Environmental Council
- Incumbent
- Assumed office 18 May 2021
- Preceded by: Patrick Bernasconi

President of the National Federation of French Mutuality
- In office 23 June 2016 – 5 October 2021
- Preceded by: Étienne Caniard
- Succeeded by: Éric Chenut

President of the General Mutual of National Education
- In office 8 July 2009 – 11 July 2017
- Preceded by: Jean-Michel Laxalt
- Succeeded by: Roland Berthilier

Personal details
- Born: 21 April 1962 (age 64) Domfront, Orne, France
- Party: Independent
- Education: Paris-East Créteil University; University of Versailles Saint-Quentin-en-Yvelines
- Occupation: Economist • Teacher • Civil servant

Thierry Beaudet (born 21 April 1962) is a French mutualist manager, president of the French Economic, Social and Environmental Council since May 2021.

== Career ==
A trained teacher, he chaired the General Mutual of National Education from July 2009 to July 2017. From 2016 to 2021, he also headed the National Federation of French Mutualism.

He was the chairman of the mutualist social protection group VYV between September 2017 and June 2021.
