= Croisière des Sables Expeditions =

French demonstration trip through the Sahara desert

Croisiere des Sables Expeditions were an attempt to pass through the entirety of the Sahara desert in 1977. The convoy consisted of seven vehicles manufactured by Saviem. The purpose was to demonstrate its new 4×4 trucks capable of long-distance travel, and to place beacons along its route.

== Routes ==
Imperial Track

The road from Morocco to Mauritania was the Imperial Track, located in a dangerous unmarked area. Ever since its creation, the route has hardly changed.

Cape Verde Red Sea Axis

The Cape Verde Red Sea Axis is a west-east route. The route was formed to be a road from Africa to the Maghreb countries, and Mecca. Befrore the automobile, the route was taken by Mauritanian pilgrims making the Hajj to Mecca.

In Algeria, three tracks stretch across Africa:

Reggan Track

The Reggan Track stretches from the west via Tanezrouft.

Djanet Track

The Djanet Track heads towards Djado in Niger, following a route marked out by Missions Berliet-Ténéré.

Tamanrasset Track

The Tamanrasset Track stretches from Algeria to Nigeria and was covered in tarmac road. The road has not held up to the desert's harsh environment, and has been torn away.

== Croisière des Sables Expeditions ==
=== Planning ===
The project's initiator, Christian Galissian drew inspiration from earlier Citroën expeditions, specifically the Black Expedition (Crosière Noire) in 1924 and the Yellow Expedition (Croisière Jaune) in 1932. This time, there would be seven Saviem trucks to participate. The team consisted of drivers, mechanics, engineers, reporters, cameramen, and a doctor.

As there was no land route to cross North Africa from west to east, the organisers had to plan a route. The light 4×4s had sufficient payload to carry crew and food, but not water and fuel. The planned route was over 10,500 km (6,500 km off-road) passing through six oases. One of the SM8 4×4s transported 200-litre drums. Each truck carried four to six spare fuel cans, a barrel of water, food, and a set of sand ladders mounted onto the exterior of the bodywork. These sand ladders were placed under the tire to restore traction if the vehicle was bogged in sand. In total, each vehicles weighed a relatively light 15 tonnes, which was within their payload capacity.

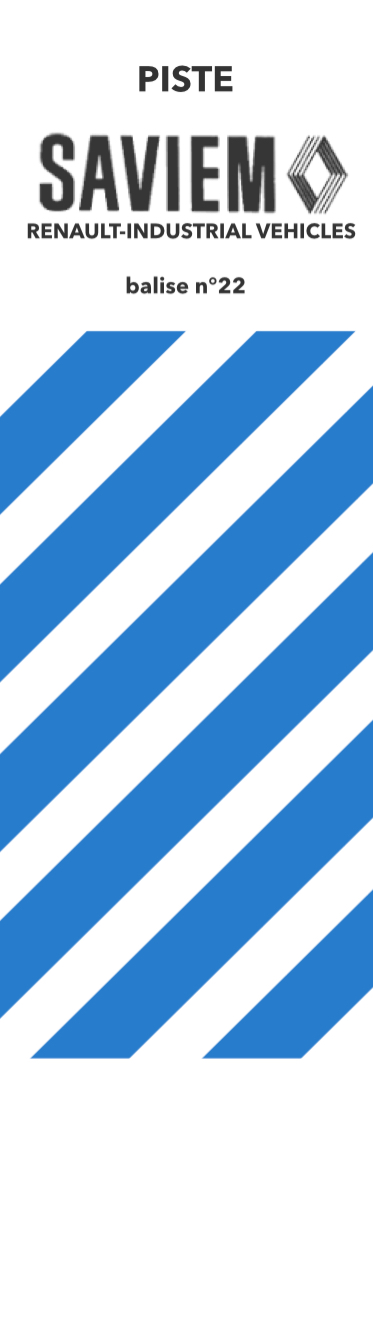
The Saviem Balises (placed in 1977) mark a route from east to west across the Sahara.

=== Beginning ===
In 1976, Renault truck brand Saviem saw it as an excellent way to promote its 4×4 trucks (specifically the TP3 and SM8). The Croisiere des Sables scheduled out their expeditions from January to April 1977 using Saviem TP3 4×4s and the SM8 4×4s. One of their objectives was to form their own east-west trail, and mark it with large blue and white beacons.

=== Journey ===
The convoy left at Nouakchott, Mauritania, on the Atlantic coast on 4 January to begin crossing the Sahara in Gao, Mali, and reached Kharga, Egypt, in April. The team consisted of five SM8s, two TP3s, with 12 crew. While passing by Gao, the doctor left the team due to conflict with the team leader, Galissian. During the journey, the group drove about ten hours a day, which was enough to cover between 10 and 200 kilometres depending on conditions. The TP3 trucks faced many mechanical issues, including a two-week stop in Agadez, Niger, waiting for spare parts. Sandstorms and frequent sand entrapments prolonged the mission. The route was 7000 – 10,000 km long, and lasted three months.

=== Aftermath ===
The Croisière des Sables fuelled public interest in crossing the African deserts. The success of the expedition demonstrated the possibility of very long-distance travel on difficult terrain in areas that had been little or not explored. Previous expeditions such Croisière noire Citroën and Mission Berliet au Ténéré have also adopted heavy goods vehicles.

=== Vehicles ===
The vehicles used during the Croisiere des Sables Expeditions were two TP3 4×4s and five SM8 4×4s.

=== Saviem Track ===
The Saviem Track begins in Gao, where the installation of the Saviem markers begins in places where vehicle passage is rare. It is likely that the Saviem trucks were the first to drive in many places on the track.

== Saviem markers ==
There were 25 Saviem markers installed in 1977 to mark the Saviem Track. These beacons were used as indicators that the track ahead will be difficult. Today visitors can place a sticker on the blue and white panel.

Saviem markers
Balise	Condition	Location	Notes
Saviem Balise 1			
Saviem Balise 2			
Saviem Balise 3			
Saviem Balise 4			
Saviem Balise 5			
Saviem Balise 6			
Saviem Balise 7			
Saviem Balise 8			
Saviem Balise 9			
Saviem Balise 10			
Saviem Balise 11			
Saviem Balise 12			
Saviem Balise 13			
Saviem Balise 14			
Saviem Balise 15			
Saviem Balise 16	Remnants remain		
Saviem Balise 17			
Saviem Balise 18			
Saviem Balise 19			
Saviem Balise 20			
Saviem Balise 21			
Saviem Balise 22	Standing – paint wear is noticeable	23°48′24.84″N 27°15′31.86″E	
Saviem Balise 23		23°57′00″N 28°25′00″E	
Saviem Balise 24			
Saviem Balise 25			

== See also ==
- Missions Berliet-Ténéré
- Missions Croisière Noire (in French)
