= Capgemini Engineering =

Innovation and engineering consulting firm

- Type: Subsidiary
- Industry: Innovation, engineering, tech and R&D consulting
- Founded: 1982; 44 years ago, in France
- Headquarters: Paris, France
- Key people: Dominique Cerutti (CEO)
- Revenue: € 2.916 billion (2018)
- Net income: € 165 million (2018)
- Number of employees: 46,693 (2018)
- Parent: Capgemini
- Website: Capgemini Engineering

Capgemini Engineering (previously known as Altran Technologies, SA) is a global innovation and engineering consulting firm founded in 1982 in France by Alexis Kniazeff and Hubert Martigny.

Altran Technologies operated primarily in high technology and innovation industries, which accounted for nearly 75% of its turnover. Administrative and information consultancy accounted for 20% of its turnover with strategy and management consulting making up the rest. The firm is active in most engineering domains, particularly electronics and IT technology.

In 2018, Altran generated €2.916 billion in revenues and employed over 46,693 people around the world. Altran was acquired by Capgemini in 2019 and was renamed as "Capgemini Engineering" on 8 April 2021 due to its merger with Capgemini's Engineering and R&D services.

== History ==
=== 1980s ===
In 1982, Alexis Kniazeff and Hubert Martigny, ex-consultants of Peat Marwick (today known as KPMG), founded CGS Informatique, which would later become Altran. By 1985, the firm counted a staff of 50 engineers.

The company expanded through small business units that would later generally range from 10 to 200 employees. Business units operated semi-independently and were given the autonomy to choose their own growth strategy and investment programs while still getting assistance from central management. This allowed business units to give each other support and share ideas. Managers’ compensation was decided based on the units’ performance.

One of Altran's first major projects was developing the on-board communications network in 1987 for France's high-speed TGV trains that allowed French lines to be connected to other European rail lines.

In 1987, the company was listed on the Secondary Market of the Paris Stock Exchange. By 1989, Altran's sales had neared the equivalent of 48 million euros. That same year, Altran bought Ségur Informatique, an aeronautics simulation and modeling company. The number of the company's employees grew to approximately 1,000 by 1990, as well as its range of expertise, moving into the transportation, telecommunications, and energy sectors, with a strong information technology component.

=== 1990s ===
In the early 1990s the company adopted a new business model. While much of the company's work during the previous decade had been performed in-house, at the beginning of the 1990s the company developed a new operational concept, that of a temp agency for the high-technology sector. The firm's staff started to work directly with its clients' projects, adding their specialized expertise to projects. By the end of the decade, the company had more than 50 subsidiaries in France, and had taken the lead of that market's technology consulting sector. The company was helped by the long-lasting recession affecting France and much of Europe at the beginning of the decade, as companies began outsourcing parts of their research and development operations. Altran was also expanding by acquisition, buying up a number of similar consultancies in France, such as the 1992 acquisition of GERPI, based in Rennes. By the end of that year, Altran's revenues had reached 76.5 million euros.

With the elimination of border controls within the European Community in 1992, the company's clients began operations in other European countries. At first Altran turned to foreign partnerships in order to accommodate its clients. Yet this approach quickly proved unsatisfactory, and Altran put into place an aggressive acquisition plan in order to establish its own foreign operations.

Altran targeted the Benelux countries, the first to lower their trade barriers, acquiring a Belgian company in 1992. By the end of the decade, the firm's network in these countries' markets was composed of 12 companies and 1,000 consultants. When an acquisition took place, Altran kept on existing management and in general the acquired firms retained their names. The acquisition policy was based on paying an initial fee for an acquisition, then on subsequent annual payments based on the acquired unit's performance.

In 1992, Altran created Altran Conseil to work in the automobile equipment, nuclear and consumer electronic industries.

Altran's operations in Spain began with the acquisition in 1993 of SDB España, a leading telecommunications consultant in that country, and later grew with the acquisitions of STE Consulting, Norma Consulting, Insert Sistemas, Strategy Consultors, Inad, Siev and Consultrans. Spain remained one of the company's top three markets into the new century, becoming a group of nine companies and more than 2,000 consultants operating under the Altran brand.

By 1995, Altran's sales had topped 155 million euros, and its total number of employees had grown to nearly 2,400 (mostly engineers). The company recognized that the majority of engineers lacked a background in management, thus a training program called IMA (Institut pour le management Altran) was launched capable of training 200 candidates per year.

In 1995 the company invested in the United Kingdom and acquired High Integrity Systems, a consulting firm focused on assisting companies that were transitioning into new-generation computer and network systems, and DCE Consultants, which operated from offices in Oxford and Manchester.

In 1997, Altran also acquired Praxis Critical Systems, founded in Bath in 1983 to provide software and safety-engineering services. In order to supplement the activities of its acquisitions, the company also opened new subsidiary offices, such as Altran Technologies UK, a multi-disciplinary and cross-industry engineering consultancy.

In the second half of the 1990s the company was acquiring an average of 15 companies per year. Italy became a target for growth in 1996, when Altran established subsidiary Altran Italy, before making its first acquisition in that country in 1997. In 1998, Altran added four new Italian acquisitions, EKAR, RSI Sistemi, CCS and Pool. In 1999, the company added an office in Turin as well as two new companies, ASP and O&I.

Germany was also a primary target for Altran during this period, starting with the 1997 establishment of Altran Technologies GmbH and the acquisition of Europspace Technische Entwicklungen, a company that had been formed in 1993 and specialized in aeronautics. In 1998, the company added consulting group Berata and, the following year, Askon Consulting joined the group, which then expanded with a second component, Askon Beratung.

Other European countries joined the Altran network in the late 1990s as well, including Portugal and Luxembourg in 1998 and Austria in 1999. In 1998, Altran deployed a telecommunications network in Portugal. By the end of 1999, the company's sales had climbed to EUR 614 million; significantly, international sales already accounted for more than one-third of the company's total revenues.

Similar progress was made in Switzerland, a market Altran entered in 1997 with the purchase of D1B2. The Berate Germany purchase brought Altran that company's Swiss office as well in 1998; that same year, Altran launched its own Swiss startup, Altran Technologies Switzerland. In 1999, the company added three new Swiss companies, Net@rchitects, Innovatica, and Cerri.

Significant projects during the decade included the design of the Météor autopilot system for the first automated subway line for the Paris Metro (Line 14) and the attitude control system for the European Space Agency's Ariane 5 rocket.

=== Early 21st century ===
In 2000, the company's Italian branch expanded to 10 subsidiaries with the opening of offices in Lombardy and Lazio and the acquisition of CEDATI. Also in 2000, Altran's presence in Switzerland grew with two new subsidiaries (Infolearn and De Simone & Osswald). In Germany, Altran acquired I&K Beratung. The United States became a primary target for the company's expansion with the acquisition of a company that was renamed Altran Corporation.

Altran began building its operations in South America as well, especially in Brazil. By the end of 2001, Altran's revenues had jumped to more than 1.2 billion euros, while its ranks of consultants now topped 15,000.

Altran become involved in a couple of new PR initiatives at the beginning of the decade, including a partnership with the Renault F1 racing team and a commitment to the Solar Impulse project with the goal of circumnavigating the Earth powered by only solar power.

In 2002, Askon Beratung was spun off from Askon consulting as a separate, independently operating company within Altran, and the company's Swiss network had added a new component with the purchase of Sigma. This year a full-scale entry into the United States was made. After providing $56 million to back a management buyout of the European, Asian, and Latin American operations of bankrupt Arthur D. Little (the US-based consulting firm founded in 1886), Altran itself acquired the Arthur D. Little brand and trademark. This acquisition was seen as an important step in achieving the company's next growth target. Sales grew to 2 billion euros by 2003 and the company had more than 40,000 engineers by 2005.

In 2004, Altran established operations in Asia and created Altran Pr[i]me [sic], a consulting outfit specialized in large-scale innovation projects.

On 29 December 2006, all subsidiaries based in Ile de France were merged under the name of Altran Technologies SA, a technology consultant, which was organized into four business lines (as well as brand names):

- Altran TEM: Telecommunications, Electronics and Multimedia.
- Altran AIT: Automobiles, Infrastructure and Transportation.
- Altran Eilis: Energy, Industry and Life Science.
- Altran ASD: Aeronautics, Space and Defence.

In 2009, Altran launched its Altran Research program. The program is centered around three main themes: designing tools, research and proof-of-concepts, and research on how to organize and improve practices.

In 2012, as part its Performance Plan 2012, PSA Peugeot Citroën chose Altran as its strategic partner.

In early 2013, Altran group finalised the acquisition of 100% of IndustrieHansa, an engineering and consulting group based in Germany, placing it among the top five in the market of Technical Consultancy, Innovation, Research and Development.

Altran continued to acquire innovation consultancies in other countries as part of its expansion strategy. In February 2015, it acquired Nspyre, a Dutch R&D and high-technology firm. In July 2015, it bought SiConTech, an Indian engineering company specializing in semiconductors.

Altran's revenues reached €1.945 billion in 2015. At that time, it had over 25,000 employees operating in over 20 countries.

In November 2015, Dominique Cerutti announced his five-year strategic plan, "Altran 2020. Ignition." The plan aimed for the firm to reach 3 billion euros in revenue in five years and a big increase in profitability.

In December 2015, Altran announced the acquisition of Tessella, in analytical and data science consulting.

In 2016, the company acquired two other American companies: Synapse, specializing in the development of innovative products, and Lohika, a software engineering firm. This transatlantic expansion is one of the principal approaches to development supported by Altran in the Ignition 2020 strategic plan.

Additionally, Altran announced in October 2016 the acquisition of two automobile industry companies: Swell, an engineering services and research and development firm based in the Czech Republic, as well as Benteler Engineering, a German firm specializing in conception and engineering services. Dominique Cerutti is noted for establishing several strategic partnerships, notably with Divergent, an American holding that integrates 3D printing in the automobile production process, and the Chinese digital mapping holding EMG (eMapgo).

22 December 2016 Acquisition: Altran acquires Pricol Technologies, an India-based engineering firm.

In July and September 2017, Altran finalized two acquisitions: Information Risk Management, and GlobalEdge. The acquisition of IRM enabled Altran to enhance its presence and offers in the domain of cyber security. The buying of GlobalEdge, an Indian software product engineering firm, aimed at helping Altran to develop its presence in India as well as in the US, where Global Edge has an office in California.

In November 2017, the company also acquired Aricent, a global digital design and engineering company headquartered in Santa Clara, California. The $2.0 billion transaction enabled the company to become the global leader in engineering and R&D services, completing its "Altran 2020. Ignition" strategic plan as early as 2018. The acquisition was completed on 22 March 2018, bringing the overall turnover of the new structure close to €3 billion.

On 28 June 2018, Altran announced the plan "The High Road, Altran 2022". This plan aimed for a 14.5% margin and a 4 billion euros turnover in 2022 by betting on technological breakthroughs.

=== Takeover by Capgemini ===
On 1 April 2020, Capgemini's friendly takeover bid for Altran was finalized. Capgemini reached the squeeze-out threshold of 90% of Altran's capital, which was delisted from stock markets on 15 April 2020.

== Organization and activities ==
The company covers the entire project life-cycle, from the planning stages (technological monitoring, technical feasibility studies, strategy planning, etc.) to final realization (design, implementation, and testing.)

== Worldwide presences ==
Altran is headquartered on the avenue Charles de Gaulle in Neuilly-sur-Seine, France. The group is present in Belgium, Brazil, Canada, China, Colombia, Germany, Spain, Ukraine, France, Italy, India, Luxembourg, Malaysia, Mexico, Tunisia, Morocco, the Netherlands, Norway, Austria, Portugal, Romania, Sweden, Switzerland, the Middle East, the United Kingdom and the United States.

Geographical breakdown of revenues: France (43.3%), Europe (51.6%) and other (5.1%).

== Research and Innovation ==
=== Altran Research ===
Altran Research, headed by Fabrice Mariaud, is Altran's internal R&D department in France. Scientific experts, each without their domain of expertise, plan and put in place research and innovation projects in collaboration with Altran Lab, academic partners and industrial actors. Current research areas include e-health, space & aeronautics, energy, complex systems, transportation and mobility, industry, and the services of the future.

=== Altran Lab ===
Altran Lab is made up of an incubator, an innovation hub and Altran Pr[i]me, created in 2004 and focused on innovation management.

=== Altran Foundation for Innovation ===
The Altran Foundation for Innovation is an international scientific competition run by the company. The competition's theme is selected each year addressing a major issue in society. The entries are judged by a panel containing scientific, political or academic experts. A prize of a year's technological support for the project is awarded to the winner and Altran's consultant teams will also follow up the awarded project.

== Pro bono work ==
Altran France does pro bono work in areas relating to culture, civic engagement and innovation. In particular, Altran aids the Musée des Arts et Métiers of Paris, the Quai Branly Museum and the Arab World Institute with their digital strategy and management of their digital cultural assets.

== Financial data ==
Altran first appeared on the Paris stock market on 20 October 1987.

- Stock valued on the Paris stock market (Euronext)
- Member of the CAC All Shares index
- ISIN Code: FR0000034639
- Number of outstanding shares as of 30 October 2015: 175,536,188
- Market capitalization as of 10 April 2019: 2.5 billion euros
- Primary stockholders as of 10 April 2019:
  - Altrafin Participations: 8.4%
  - Alexis Kniazeff: 1.4%
  - Hubert Martigny: 1.4%

=== Financial data table ===
Financial Data (in millions of euros)
Year	2004	2005	2006	2007	2008	2009	2010	2011	2012	2013	2014	2015	2016	2017	2018
Revenue	1418	1435	1495.6	1591.4	1650.1	1403.7	1436.6	1419.5	1455.9	1633	1756.3	1945.1	2120.1	2282.2	2916
EBIT	59.2	93.2	76	99.4	127	31	69.1	113.1	124.9	143	164.6	185.9	219.7	246.3	-
Net income	16.9	0.2	3.8	21.6	11.4	74.8	26	45.5	64.9	65.8	82.5	100.7	122.5	139.7	165
Equity	319.7	347.5	382.9	397.5	503.7	459.4	446.7	406.5	469.6	653.9	710.9	794.4	862.3	891	1692
Debt	379.4	336.9	379.9	359.5	208.3	-185.3	203.4	194.9	168.5	30.3	42.4	144	210	351	1312

== See also ==
- List of IT consulting firms
- Frog Design Inc.
- Tessella
- Cambridge Consultants
