= Route Mobile =

Indian technology company

Route Mobile Ltd
- Formerly: Route SMS
- Company type: Public
- Traded as: NSE: ROUTE; BSE: 543228
- ISIN: INE450U01017
- Industry: Telecommunication
- Founded: 2004; 22 years ago
- Founder: Rajdip Gupta
- Headquarters: Mumbai, Maharashtra, India
- Area served: India
- Key people: Rajdip Gupta; (MD, Group CEO); Sandip Gupta; (Chairman – Non-executive)
- Products: Messaging Solutions, Voice, Chatbot, Identity Solutions, Emailer
- Revenue: ▲₹4,023 crore (US$420 million) (FY24)
- Net income: ▲₹388 crore (US$40 million) (FY24)
- Owner: Proximus Opal (2024–present)
- Number of employees: 700+ (2022)
- Parent: Proximus Group; (2024–present)
- Website: www.routemobile.com

Route Mobile (formerly Routesms Solutions Ltd) is an Indian cloud communications platform as a service (CPaaS) company. Started in 2004 and headquartered in Mumbai, the company has presence in more than 15 locations across Asia-Pacific, Middle East, Africa, Europe and North America.

== History ==
Route Mobile was started in Mumbai in May 2004 as a cloud communications platform provider for over the top (OTT) and mobile network operators (MNO). It partnered with companies including Idea Cellular, Lanka Bell, and Arab Financials Services for providing messaging services in India, Sri Lanka, Middle East and North Africa region.

In May 2017, Route Mobile acquired Call 2 Connect, an ITES provider based out of India. In the same year, Route Mobile acquired 365squared, a SMS firewall company based out of Malta.

In July 2023, it was announced that Belgian telecommunications company Proximus Group would be taking a majority stake in Route Mobile through its daughter holding Opal. On May 8, 2024, it was announced that this transaction had been completed.

== Recognition ==
- 2019: The Best Messaging Innovation – Consumer Solution Award at Messaging and SMS Global Awards, London.
- 2019: The Fastest Growing Indian Technology and Telecom Company Award in UK at India Meets Britain Tracker 2019.
- 2020: Among the most fastest growing companies in Technology & Telecom sector and overall 2nd in the UK's top fastest growing Indian companies in the United Kingdom 2020.
- 2019: The Best Governed Company in the unlisted segment (Emerging Category) award at the 19th ICSI National Award for Corporate governance.
