= Olivier Sarkozy =

French-American businessman (born 1969)

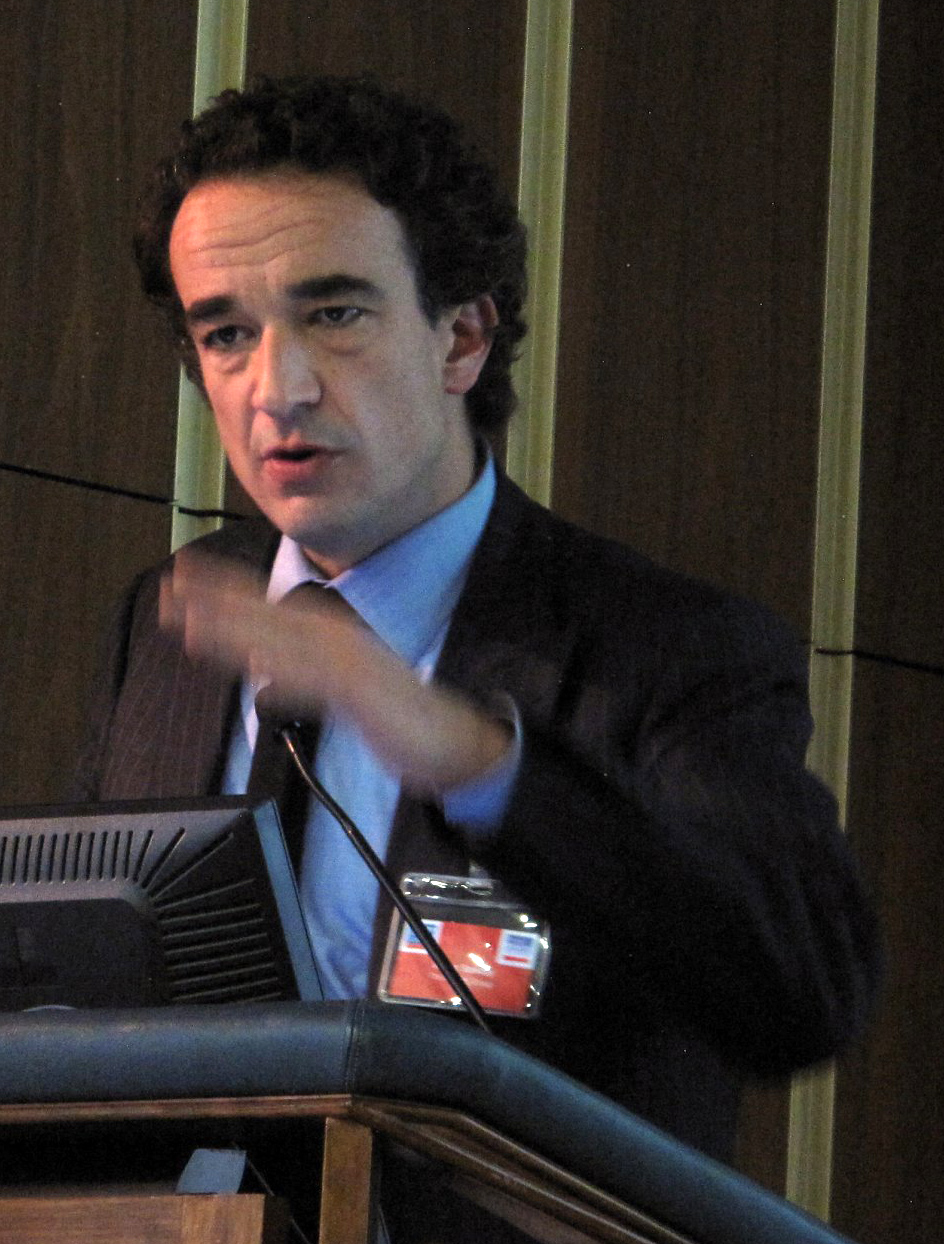
- Sarkozy at London Business School; Private Equity conference, 2011
- Born: 26 May 1969 (age 57); Paris, France
- Education: University of St. Andrews
- Occupation: Banker
- Spouses: Charlotte Bernard (m. 1997; div. 2011) Mary-Kate Olsen (m. 2015; div. 2021)
- Children: 2
- Relatives: Guillaume Sarkozy (paternal half-brother); Nicolas Sarkozy (paternal half-brother); Jean Sarkozy (nephew)

Pierre Olivier Sarközy de Nagy-Bocsa (born 26 May 1969) is a French banker based in the United States. His half-brother is Nicolas Sarkozy, the former President of France.

== Early life ==
Pierre Olivier Sarkozy was born to Pál István Ernő Sárközy de Nagy-Bócsa, a nobleman of Hungarian descent, and Christine de Ganay, who was herself of French descent. His father was previously married and had three children with his first wife, including Nicolas, whom Pierre Olivier Sarkozy met weekly during his early childhood. De Ganay divorced Pál Sarkozy, and then married an American diplomat, when Pierre Olivier Sarkozy was 7. He spent the rest of his childhood and adolescence outside France, living in Zambia, Egypt, and a boarding school in the UK. Pierre Olivier Sarkozy later studied at the University of St Andrews, where he earned an M.A. in medieval history.

== Career ==
In 1990, Pierre Olivier Sarkozy was hired by the American investment bank Dillon, Read & Co. He left three years later to join Credit Suisse First Boston, where he held several senior posts, including Managing Director in the Financial Institutions Group.

While at CSFB, Pierre Olivier Sarkozy advised Wachovia in its merger of equals with First Union and concurrent defense against a competing hostile proposal from Suntrust; Dime Bancorp in its merger with Washington Mutual; CoreStates Financial in its sale to First Union; and Wells Fargo in its merger with Norwest Corporation and acquisition of First Interstate, among others.

In January 2003, he joined UBS Investment Bank, where he was Global Co-Head of the Financial Institutions Group. At UBS, he worked on such transactions as Sallie Mae's attempt to go private and subsequent recapitalization; ABN Amro's $21 billion sale of LaSalle Bank to Bank of America; Mellon's $17 billion merger of equals with the Bank of New York; Charles Schwab's sale of U.S. Trust to Bank of America; MBNA's $36 billion sale to Bank of America; Wachovia's $14 billion acquisition of Southtrust; National Commerce's $7 billion sale to Suntrust; and Regions Financial's $6 billion merger of equals with Union Planters.

Pierre Olivier Sarkozy was responsible for CIBC's $2.9 billion recapitalization and Sallie Mae's $3.0 billion recapitalization. He also acted as lead advisor in a number of other notable transactions, including Dime Bancorp's private placement of preferred and other equity securities to Warburg Pincus (as part of its successful defense against a hostile tender offer from North Fork) and the recapitalization of Glendale Federal Bank, representing the then-largest recapitalization in history. On 3 March 2008, he was appointed Co-head and Managing Director of the Carlyle Group's Global Financial Services Group. He resigned from that position in May 2016. Based in New York City, Sarkozy is a member of the Board of Directors of BankUnited.

== Personal life ==
In the 1990s, Pierre Olivier Sarkozy married Charlotte Bernard, a freelance fashion writer and author of children's books, who grew up in Paris. They were married by his half-brother, Nicolas, who was then mayor of Neuilly-sur-Seine. They have two children. Pierre Olivier Sarkozy and Bernard were married for 14 years before separating in 2010, with their divorce being finalized the following year.

In May 2012, Pierre Olivier Sarkozy began a relationship with fashion designer and former child actress Mary-Kate Olsen. The two were married on 27 November 2015, at a private residence in New York City. On 17 April 2020, Olsen filed for divorce from Pierre Olivier Sarkozy. On 13 May she filed an emergency order to proceed despite delays due to the COVID-19 pandemic, but it was denied a day later. On 25 January 2021, the divorce was finalized.
