= Altran Foundation for Innovation =

Branch of Altran Technologies

- Founded: 1996
- Purpose: Research
- Location: Paris, France
- Region served: Global
- Method: Technological support
- Key people: Philippe Salle, President of the Altran Foundation for Innovation, Chairman & Chief Executive of the Altran group; Frédéric Fougerat, Executive Vice-President of the Altran Foundation for Innovation, Group Communications Director; Christian Le Liepvre, Director of the Altran Foundation for Innovation; Corinne Jouanny, Director of Altran Pr[i]me; Jean Audouze, Vice-President of the French National Commission for UNESCO
- Website: altran-foundation.org

The Altran Foundation for Innovation is a vehicle of social action of the group Altran Technologies. Created in 1996, its main focus is promoting technological innovation for human benefit. One of the ways it does this is by holding an international scientific competition with a new theme every year, rewarding leaders of innovative technology-oriented projects.

== Health awards ==
=== Brain-powered remote control for paralyzed people ===
The brain–computer interface system of Professor Jonathan Wolpaw aims to facilitate the communication of patients with locked-in syndrome. It enables patients to move a cursor on a computer screen, dictate a text or control a robotic arm.

=== Artificial retina ===
The artificial retina of Professor José Sahel and his team at the Quinze-Vingts National Ophthalmology Hospital Centre aims to allow people with degenerative retinal disease, numbering 1.5 million in 2008, to accomplish everyday activities. Placed under the existing retina, it directly stimulates the neurons, replacing defective cells. These implants should eventually allow patients to recognize faces, read large print and move independently in a restricted environment. The challenge for the Altran teams was to find solutions to produce artificial retinas in series,in order to bring solutions to the widest number of patients.

=== Pain treatment based on cell micro-encapsulation ===
In 1998, the Altran Foundation prize was awarded to the Toulouse-Rangueil University laboratory, and to the Kappa Biotech company for their pain-treatment project based on cell micro-encapsulation. The micro-encapsulation process stops the organism from rejecting these cells by protecting them in a sphere, thus preventing the immune system from recognizing them. The process involves creating biocompatible micro-membranes which are implanted using in-vitro fertilization which is live allogeneic or xenogenic cells that are wrapped in a semi-permeable immune-sparing membrane using a bioengineering technique known as cell encapsulation for therapeutic purposes. Until recently, the implantation posed a number of productivity problems, as it was taking 15 minutes for one micro-membrane to be implanted. Altran teams stepped in to help solve this problem. Their studies demonstrated that the automated implantation option, using a laser optical guidance system, was the most promising approach. With the cooperation of Tarbes E.N.I. students, Altran consultants developed a robot to automate the microcapsule filling operation using a dual-needle system. The robot is now commercialized.

=== Test patch for child food allergies ===
The team from DBV Technologies has developed a patented process to determine allergies in children known as the E-Patch. These patch tests are intended to preserve the allergic agents in their optimal state.

This technique uses the principle of freeze drying and electrification to retain the allergens on the patch without using solvent or glue. The E-patch is then conditioned to remain air-tight and . Once applied to the child, the allergic agents are rapidly hydrated by body transpiration and liberated from the patch. They enter into contact with the skin and create, if positive, a reaction which can be seen by the doctor 48 hours later.

== Environmental awards ==
=== Economic solar panel ===
The MAXXUN project was to develop a system of disruptive solar cells based on the luminescent solar concentrating (LSC) technology in order to lower the investment for a solar energy system by more than half. Altran Technologies consultants have worked during a year with the award-winning team to increase the surface area of the panel from 2.5 cm^{2} to 10 cm, to apply an absorbing and dispersing layer on this extra surface area, to optimize light power under different conditions, to build a demonstration model and to identify potential partners.

=== Ecologic system of soil decontamination ===
The Altran Foundation jury awarded the first prize 2001 to Julien Troquet, a young research engineer and founder of the start-up company Biobasic Environnement. His project consists in developing a decontamination process for soil using bioremediation. This process allows for a complete decontamination using a gentle "alternative" method, so the excavation of the site is not necessary and the ecosystem is preserved. It is five times less expensive than competing techniques and can also be used on many different types of pollution.

=== Laser restoration of historical monuments ===
The companies Jaulard and Trivella (companies from France and Italy, respectively), together with the laser specialists Quantel (France) and Unilaser (from France and Portugal) have developed the LAMA project of a laser that can be carried by hand and used to clean the facades and sculpted ornaments of historical monuments. The process makes it easier to select the area to be cleaned without damaging "the outer skin" of the stone and outperforms all other existing systems at a fifth of the cost.

== International solidarity awards ==
=== Desalination of sea water ===
Work by Viviane Renaudin has led to the development of a new type of multiple-effect plate evaporator, which can be used for the desalination of brackish or sea water. The proposed distillation process is based on the principle of multiple-effect dripping film plate evaporators. The innovation lies in the horizontal transfer of vapour to the condensation zone. From a socio-economic point of view, thanks to its human-scale dimensions, its modular construction and its ease of assembly, the system has the advantage of being usable by unskilled operators in developing countries. The process also has political value: it enables countries to end their dependence on their neighbours for their drinking water supplies.

=== New generation fuel ===
The aim of Guy Reinaud's project is to reply to the needs, in renewable domestic energy, of a population of 2 billion individuals living in the tropical regions of Africa, Latin America, and Asia, and at the same time fighting against deforestation and climatic changes. The proposed solution is biomass charcoal as a source of renewable energy—patented and developed by Pro-Natura International. Biomass charcoal produces domestic energy from non-upgraded biomass, other than wood, in particular agricultural residues non-consumed by animals. By reducing the dependence on wood, biomass charcoal protects forests and as a consequence ,fights against desertification. Moreover, the energy produced by biomass charcoal is equal to that of wood charcoal for a sales price per kilo 50% cheaper.

== Science awards ==
=== Detection of cosmic particles ===
HiSPARC, a Dutch university research Institute, is proposing to challenge teams of secondary school pupils and teachers with the study of ultra-high energy cosmic rays. HiSPARC wants to make young people discover and "experience the sciences" by creating a teaching network of teams of pupil-researchers. Liaising closely with academic and scientific institutions, these groups will work on the design, control, and operation of particular items of detection equipment. The retrieval of the data obtained and its analysis will then be the subject of interpretation.

=== Food tracing systems ===
The first prize went to Dominique Grégoire from the company TechniGREG who developed new tracing systems: TraciLOG and TraciMEAL. This improved monitoring of the cold chain is a major step forward as far as consumer safety is concerned. The principle is to endow each mobile container with "electronic intelligence", thus enabling it to log each of the phases through which it passes, monitor its internal temperature and record information about whether its doors are open or closed. This information is gathered automatically and securely, without any contact with the contents, and requires no human intervention. It is a reliable global management indicator for use by the logistics service in charge of maintaining the cold chain. Altran engineers worked side by side with the prize-winner, on conducting market studies, on the choice of suppliers, on developing product packaging, on the design of an electronic module and on the transition to the production stage for both TraciLOG and TraciMEAL. After the support, TechniGREG increased its capital of more than 1 million euros. The efforts of these teams were rewarded in March 2001, when a fully operational version of TraciLOG was installed for the first time by a supermarket distributor. TraciMEAL was adopted last May by an institutional food service provider in Toulouse. Since then, TechniGREG, which has registered many patents related to this innovation, has come into business with many companies, particularly in the air transport sector.
