= Phonon Communications =

Phonon Communications Pvt. Ltd.
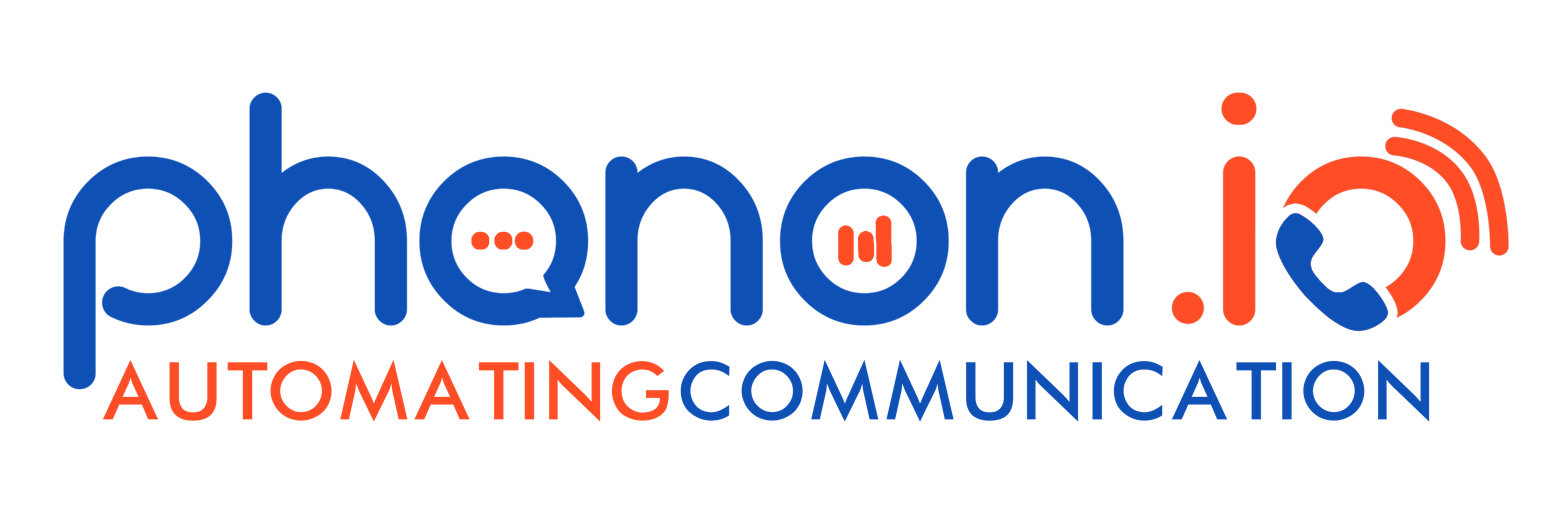
- Type: Private
- Industry: Telecommunications
- Founded: 2006
- Founder: Ujwal Makhija
- Headquarters: Vadodara, Gujarat, India
- Key people: Samish Makhija, Ujwal Makhija
- Products: Click-to-Call & Instant Connect; Contact Center Automation Suite; Intelligent IVR; Proactive Outbound Engagement; Chatbot
- Services: cloud telephony
- Website: phonon.io

Phonon Communications is an Indian cloud telephony company based in Vadodara, Gujarat.

== History ==
It was founded in October 2006 by Samish Makhija and Ujwal Makhija, who are alumni of IIM Ahmedabad and IIM Calcutta. In November 2017, Phonon acquired Gurgaon-based chatbot startup iDelivr for an undisclosed sum. In April 2021, Route Mobile announced an agreement to acquire Phonon Communications for Rs. 29 crore. In July that year, Route Mobile disclosed that it would no longer pursue the acquisition, citing unfulfilled conditions precedent.

== Operations ==
The company provides automated outbound calling services. Its click-to-call service allows website users to request a telephone callback. It acquires iDeliver, home to India's largest loanbot. The company also provides interactive voice response and contact-centre automation services. Its services have been used by companies in banking, financial services, insurance, travel and aviation.on Communications. It was also used by airline group Kingfisher Airlines and Rediff. In January 2017, Indian domestic airline Vistara implemented Phonon's Unified Communication Solution for flight advisories.

== Awards ==
In November 2016 Phonon was awarded the #400 spot on Deloitte's 2016 Technology Fast 500 Asia Pacific List Phonon ranked joint 47th in Deloitte's Technology Fast 50 India ranking in 2016. In September 2016 Phonon was awarded with the Red Herring Top 100 Asia award.
