= Bócsa =

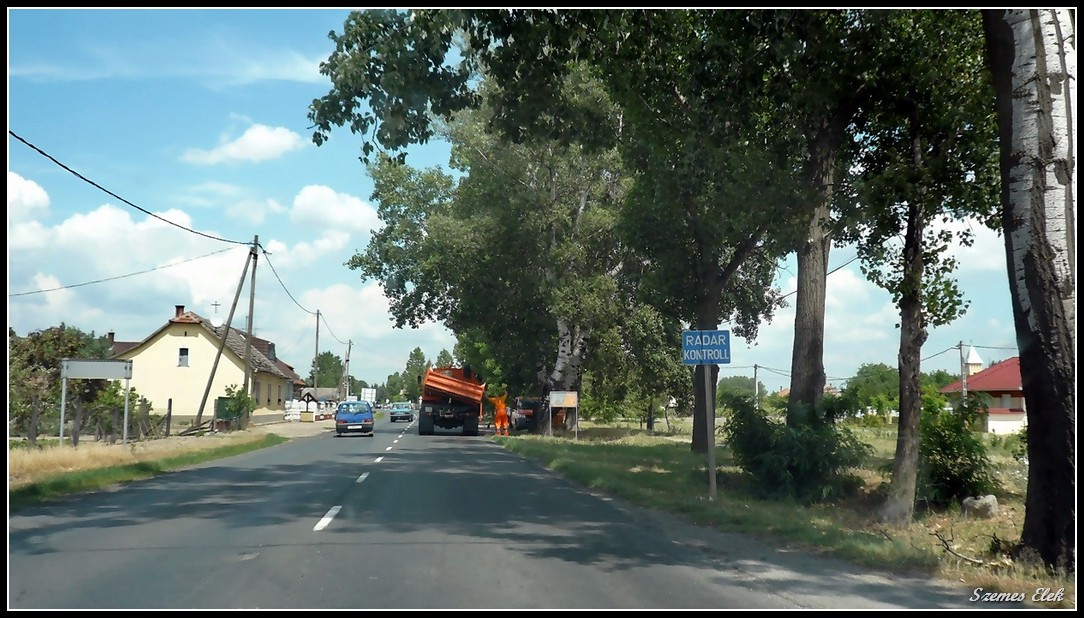

- Flag Coat of arms

- Location of Bócsa in Hungary.
- Coordinates: 46°36′N 19°30′E
- Country: Hungary
- Region: Southern Great Plain
- County: Bács-Kiskun

Government
  - Mayor: Szőke-Tóth Mihály (Fidesz–KDNP)

Area
  - Total: 97.04 km^{2} (37.47 sq mi)

Population (2022)
  - Total: 1,791
  - Density: 18.46/km^{2} (47.80/sq mi)
- Time zone: UTC+1 (CET)
  - Summer (DST): UTC+2 (CEST)
- Postal code: 6235
- Area code: 78

Bócsa is a village and municipality in Bács-Kiskun county, in the Southern Great Plain region of southern Hungary. It lies about 9 km northeast of Soltvadkert.

== Geography ==
It covers an area of 97.04 km^{2} (37 sq mi) and has a population of 1791 people (2022).

== Demographics ==
=== Ethnicity ===
As the census of 2022 the people of Bócsa identified themselves as:

- Hungarian - 85.5%
- German - 1.3%
- Romanian - 0.6%
- Romani - 0.3%
- Other - 1.8%

=== Religion ===
The religious affiliations of the people of Bócsa are:

- Roman Catholic - 33.2%
- Calvinist - 8.1%
- Lutheran - 7.1%
- Non-religious - 4.5%

In addition, 44% of the people did not wish to state their religious affiliation.

== People ==
- Sárközy de Nagy-Bócsa family
