= French Economic, Social and Environmental Council =

French consultative assembly

Economic, Social and Environmental Council Conseil économique, social et environnemental

Type
- Type: Consultative assembly

Leadership
- President: Thierry Beaudet
- Seats: 233 Councillors

The Economic, Social and Environmental Council (French: Conseil économique, social et environnemental), known as the Economic and Social Council before the constitutional law of 23 July 2008, is a consultative assembly in France. It does not play a role in the adoption of statutes and regulations, but advises the lawmaking bodies on questions of social and economic policies.

The executive may refer any question or proposal of social or economic importance to the Economic, Social and Environmental Council. The Council publishes reports, which are sent to the Prime Minister, National Assembly and Senate. They are published in the Journal Officiel.

== See also ==
- Economic and Social Committee of the European Union
- United Nations Economic and Social Council
- Critical mineral raw materials
