= Berliet T100 =

Large French 6x6 truck

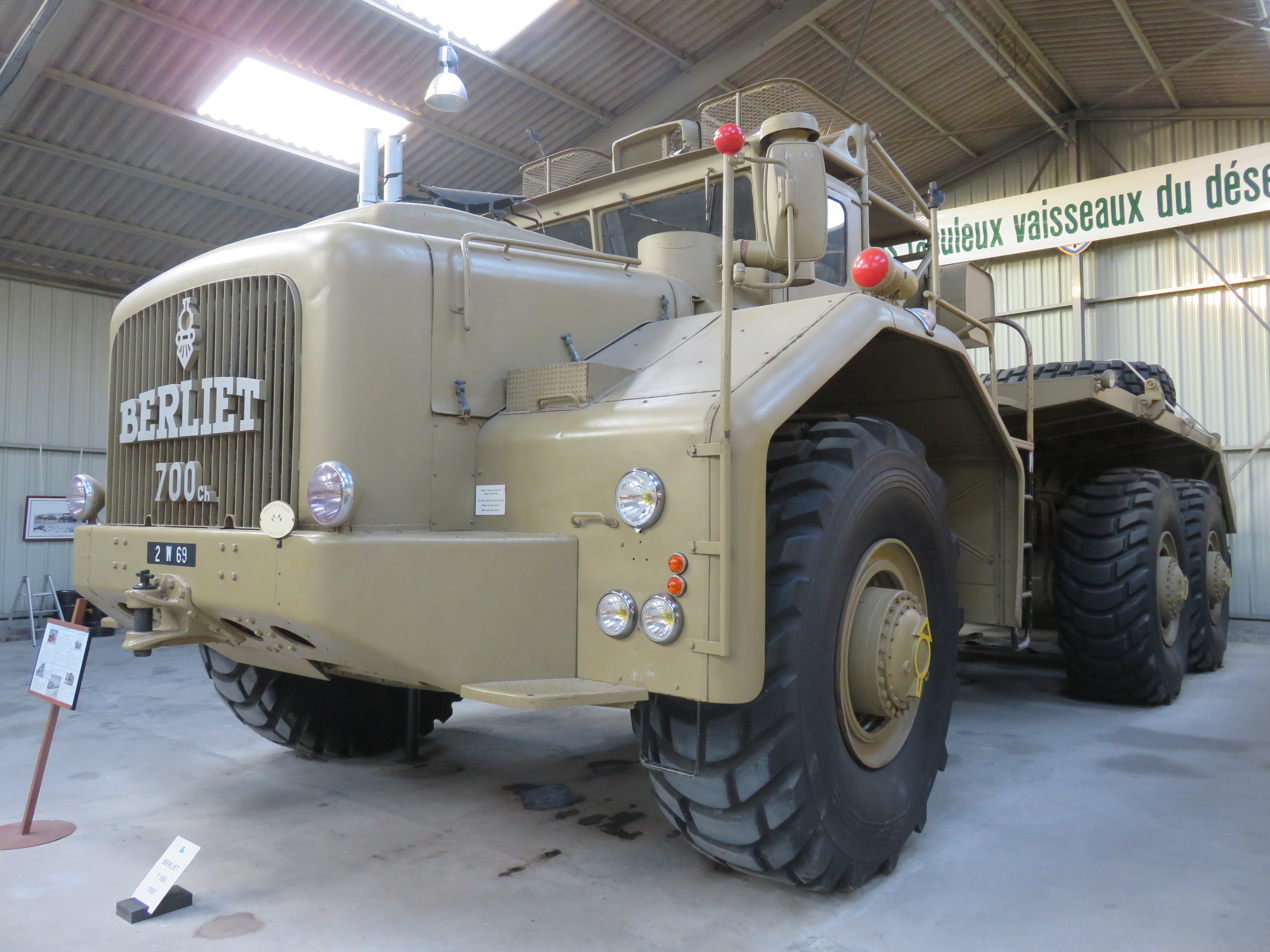
- Berliet T100 No.2 on display at the Fondation Marius Berliet in October 2018

Overview
- Manufacturer: Berliet

Body and chassis
- Body style: Truck
- Layout: 6x6

Powertrain
- Engine: Drive: 29.6 L (1,806.3 cu in) Cummins V12 diesel engine, 700 hp (522.0 kW); Auxiliary: Panhard diesel engine
- Transmission: Clark hydraulic-coupling semi-automatic transmission (4 forward, 4 reverse)

Dimensions
- Length: 15.3 m (50.2 ft)
- Width: 4.98 m (16.3 ft)
- Height: 4.43 m (14.5 ft)
- Curb weight: 110,231 lb (49,999.9 kg)

The Berliet T100 was a special duty truck manufactured by Berliet in the 1950s. At the time, it was the largest truck in the world.

== Design ==
Three trucks were built with normal control (with the cab behind the front axle); the fourth was built with forward control (cab-over-engine design (and sleeping accommodation)). They had 29.6-litre Cummins V12 engines, providing 600 hp (441 kW) and later 700 hp (515 kW). The trucks were intended for off-road use, in the oil and mining industries, in particular petroleum exploration in the Sahara. Steering was powered by a separate small Panhard engine.

The first two trucks were 6x6 flatbeds with gross weights of 103 tonnes; the third was built as a 6x4 dumper truck, for the uranium mine at Bessines-sur-Gartempe; the fourth was another flatbed truck with 102 tonne gross weight, or 190 tonnes as a tractor. It was experimentally fitted with a Turbomeca gas turbine in 1962, but fuel consumption was excessive, so the conventional diesel engine was fitted again.

== History ==
The trucks were designed and built in secret, and with a tight deadline; the first was finished after nine months, at the factory in Courbevoie. It was unveiled, by surprise, at the 1957 Paris car show. However, it was too big to fit in the main exhibition hall, so Berliet built a special external pavilion to exhibit the huge new truck. It was then shown at various other car shows - Lyon, Avignon, Helsinki, Casablanca, Frankfurt, and Geneva. It went to work in the oil and gas fields of the Sahara; after Algerian independence it became property of the Algerian government, and was eventually preserved in Hassi-Messaoud.

The second T100 was built in 1958 and two more in 1959.

The second T100, having worked in Algeria, was later returned to the Berliet Foundation's museum in 1981.

The trucks were stablemates of the Berliet GBO15, a 60-ton 6x6 truck which had been released in 1956. 45 were built, most exported to Algeria.

== See also ==
- Missions Berliet-Ténéré
