= Domjean =

- Commune
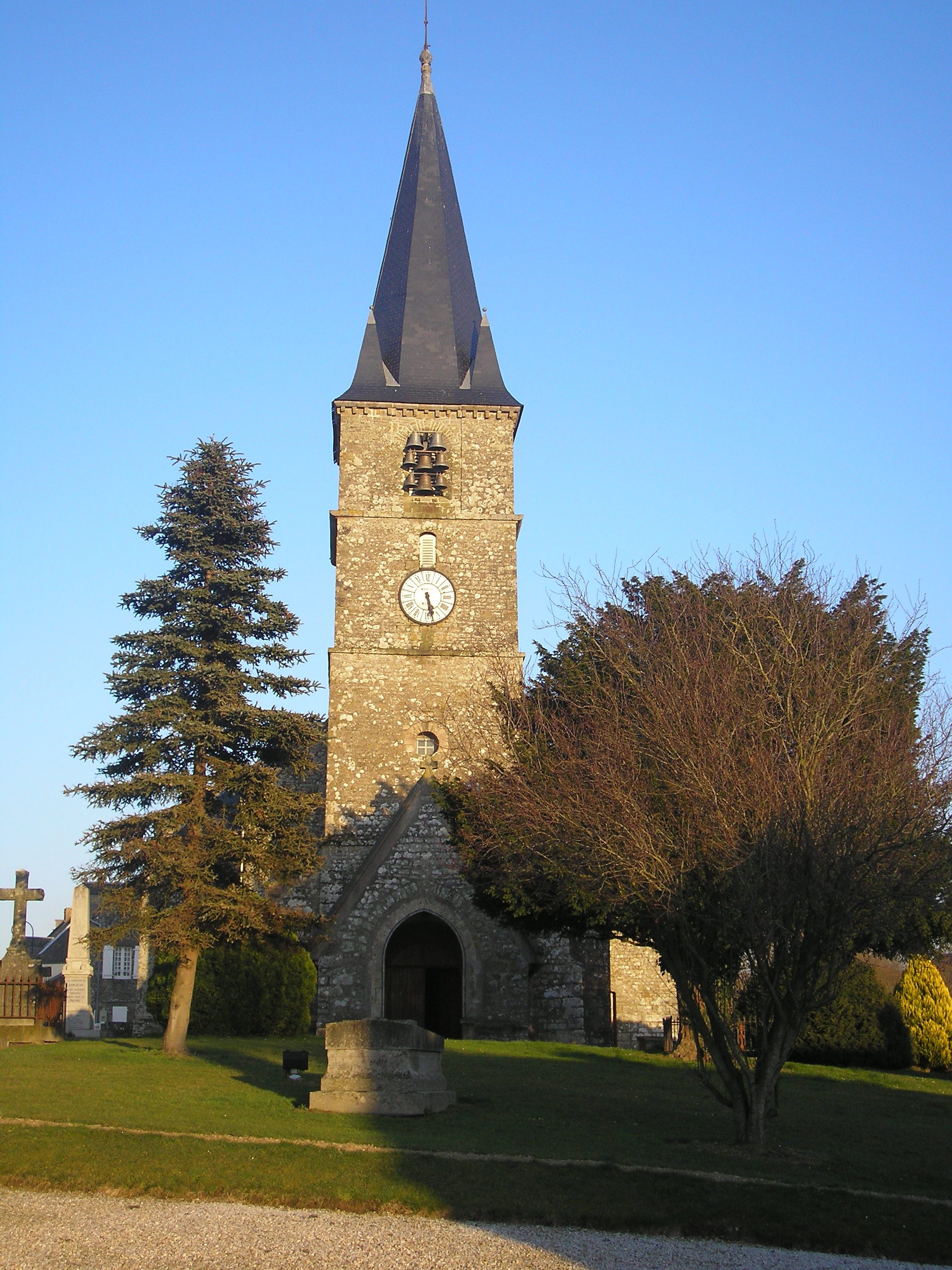
- Saint-Jean-Baptiste church
- Location of Domjean
- Location within France Location within Normandy
- Coordinates: 48°59′16″N 1°01′52″W
- Country: France
- Region: Normandy
- Department: Manche
- Arrondissement: Saint-Lô
- Canton: Condé-sur-Vire
- Intercommunality: Saint-Lô Agglo

Government
  - Mayor (2020–2026): Louis Jannière
- Area^{1}: 16.57 km^{2} (6.40 sq mi)
- Highest elevation: 178 m (584 ft)
- Lowest elevation: 30 m (98 ft)
- Population (2023): 999
  - Density: 60.3/km^{2} (156/sq mi)
- Demonym: Domjeanais
- Time zone: UTC+01:00 (CET)
  - Summer (DST): UTC+02:00 (CEST)
- INSEE/Postal code: 50164 /50420
- ^{1} French Land Register data, which excludes lakes, ponds, glaciers > 1 km^{2} (0.386 sq mi or 247 acres) and river estuaries.

Domjean (French pronunciation: [dɔ̃ʒɑ̃]) is a commune in the Manche department in north-western France.

== See also ==
- Communes of the Manche department
