= Guillaume Sarkozy =

French businessman

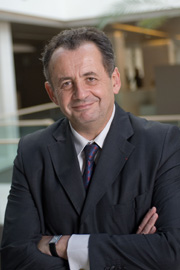
Guillaume Sarkozy

Guillaume Georges Didier Sárközy de Nagy-Bócsa simply known as Guillaume Sarkozy, is a French entrepreneur and vice-president of the MEDEF, the French union of employers. Guillaume Sarkozy is the older brother of former French president Nicolas Sarkozy. He has a half-brother, Olivier Sarkozy.

He was enrolled in the private Catholic middle and high school Cours Saint-Louis de Monceau, and then in the public Lycée (High School) Janson-de-Sailly, both located in Paris. He holds an engineering degree from the École spéciale des travaux publics (ESTP) of Paris.

Guillaume Sarkozy started his career working on assignments at the Directorate (Office) of Public Safety (direction de la sécurité civile) inside the Ministry of Interior (1974-1976). He then joined IBM France where he was a sales engineer (1976-1979).

In 1979, he became COO of Tissage de Picardie and has been its president and CEO since 1981. He also became CEO of Tissage Rinet (1985) and Velveterie (1990), which he merged with Tissage de Picardie. He is now the owner of the company, having bought it from the family of his first wife. Tissage de Picardie is one of the world leaders in upholstery fabrics. Located in the Somme département, it employs around 120 people, and exports about 65% of its production.

Guillaume Sarkozy entered the CNPF, later renamed MEDEF, where he was the chairman of the Committee on Social Welfare (commission de la protection sociale). He is now the vice-president of the MEDEF (since 2000), and has also been the chaeirman of the French Union of Textile Industries (Union des industries textiles, or UIT) since 2000.
