= Jean Sarkozy =

French politician

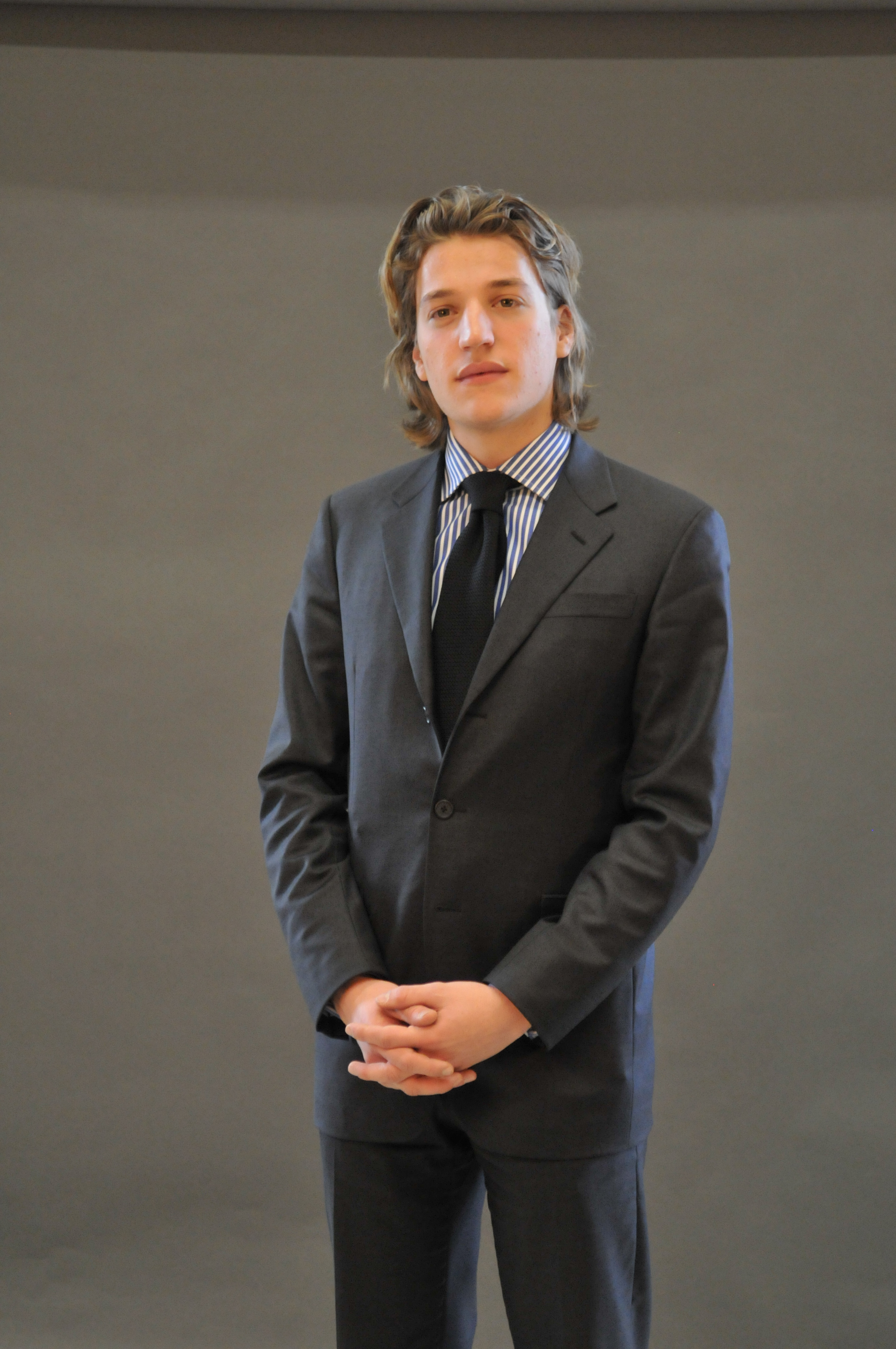
- Sarkozy in 2008
- Born: Jean Nicolas Brice Sárközy de Nagy-Bócsa; 1 September 1986 (age 39); Neuilly-sur-Seine, Paris, France
- Occupation: Politician
- Spouse: Jessica Sebaoun-Darty (m. 2008)
- Children: 2
- Parent(s): Nicolas Sarkozy; Marie-Dominique Culioli

Jean Nicolas Brice Sárközy de Nagy-Bócsa (French pronunciation: [ʒɑ̃ saʁ.kɔ.zi]; Hungarian: nagybócsai Sárközy János; born 1 September 1986) is the son of the former President of France Nicolas Sarkozy. Jean is a regional councillor in the city of Neuilly-sur-Seine, France, and registered as a first-year law student at Paris 1 Pantheon-Sorbonne University in 2007. He is a backroom activist for his father's Union for a Popular Movement (UMP), a right wing party.

== Early life ==
Sarkozy was born in September 1986 to Nicolas Sarkozy and his first wife Marie-Dominique Culioli. He has an older brother, Pierre (born 1985), a younger half-brother named Louis (born 1997) from his father's second marriage to Cécilia Ciganer-Albéniz as well as a younger half-sister named Giulia (born 2011) from his father's third marriage to Carla Bruni.

== Neuilly-sur-Seine mayorship ==
Nicolas Sarkozy attempted to parachute David Martinon, his presidential spokesman, into the mayorship of Neuilly-sur-Seine where the president had formerly served as mayor. Jean Sarkozy was asked to persuade the voters to support his father's choice. After a poll showed that Martinon was not very popular and would lose the election, Jean Sarkozy publicly broke rank and said it was impossible to continue backing his father's mayoral choice. He and other politicians from the UMP party decided to campaign on their own ticket. Martinon stepped down as the party's candidate for mayor. Jean Sarkozy announced he was running for office himself as the UMP candidate for regional councillor in the electoral district of Neuilly-Sud. He was born, brought up and now lives in Neuilly-Sud. He faced three other candidates, Marie Brannens from the Socialist Party, and candidates from the Democratic Movement (MoDem) and the Front National.

== La Défense controversy ==
In 2009, Sarkozy was nominated to become the head of EPAD, the development agency for La Défense. Located in the Paris metropolitan area, La Défense is Europe's largest purpose-built business district, also visited by millions of tourists annually, with the EPAD agency managing an annual budget of more than one billion Euros. French and international newspapers ran stories examining the link between the nomination and Sarkozy's father's presidency. Criticism has been made about the obvious lack of academic qualities and professional experience for such a high position. An online petition against the nomination received 10,000 signatures a day. In October 2009, a survey found that 64% of French people opposed EPAD's hiring of Sarkozy.

The Times called the nomination an "astonishing act of nepotism by Nicolas Sarkozy" and said that "Jean, who is repeating his second year of undergraduate law at the Sorbonne, after having repeated the first year, was elected to a Neuilly seat on the notoriously sleaze-ridden department council last year. He was immediately given the job of heading Dad's Union for a Popular Movement on the body."

The President of Medef replied to these criticisms saying she believed it was "fantastic that a young and motivated man" may want to be at the head of the largest business district in France. Likewise, Nicolas Sarkozy defended his son by saying that "it's never good when someone is attacked in an excessive manner for no reason". Jean Sarkozy said that would not give up the position, and demanded on French television not to be judged on his name, but on his performance. He received the support of David Douillet, then a newly elected UMP member in the Chamber of Deputies of France. Finally due to mounting pressure, Jean Sarkozy had to renounce his nomination.

== Personal life ==
Jean Sarkozy was born in Neuilly-sur-Seine and educated at the Lycée Pasteur. He married Jessica Sebaoun-Darty, who is of Jewish descent, on 10 September 2008 at the Neuilly-sur-Seine city hall. She gave birth to their first child-a son, Solal Nicolas Marc-André—on 13 January 2010. His second child, a daughter Lola was born in April 2012. His wife is the daughter of Marc-André Sebaoun and Isabelle née Darty. She is heiress to a major consumer electronics company, the Darty group. He has denied reports that he intends to convert from Catholicism to Judaism, Sebaoun's religion. In 2009, the cartoonist Siné came under sharp criticism and was sacked from Charlie Hebdo after accusing Jean Sarkozy of converting out of ambition, as well as being sued by the International League against Racism and Anti-Semitism (LICRA).

In 2007, Le Canard enchaîné, an investigative weekly newspaper, reported that French police had gone to extraordinary lengths to try to find his scooter when it was stolen, including taking DNA samples from his helmet. The scooter was recovered in 10 days.
