= Site manager =

Profession in the construction industry

In the construction industry, site managers, often referred to as construction managers, site agents or building managers, are responsible for the day-to-day on site running of a construction project. Site managers are required to keep within the timescale and budget of a project, and manage any delays or problems encountered on-site during a construction project. Also involved in the role is the managing of quality control, health and safety checks and the inspection of work carried out. Many site managers will be involved before site activity takes place, and are responsible for managing communications between all parties involved in the on-site development of the project. Site managers are often required to deal with inquiries and communication with the public. Typically a site manager is employed by a construction company, contractor or civil engineering firm but they are often employed by local authorities to oversee the refurbishment of council owned properties.

== Qualifications ==
Qualifying as a site manager in the UK can be done by several routes, with many site managers having progressed from project or contract management roles. The Chartered Institute of Building (CIOB) provides an educational and accreditation framework for structural engineers and other roles in the industry, and a specific Graduate Diploma Programme for those occupying jobs in construction but without a construction related degree.

== Career and remuneration ==
Site managers' remuneration depends on a number of factors including sector, level of experience and the size of the project. A 2010 salary survey of the construction and built environment industry showed the average annual salary of a site manager in the UK to be £36,981. Site managers in areas of growth in the construction industry such as the Middle East earn more, with the average earning across all sector and all levels of experience at £42,424.

== Read more ==
- Construction management
