= Cloud communications =

Data center-hosted voice and info transfer services

Cloud communications are Internet-based voice and data communications where telecommunications applications, switching and storage are hosted by a third-party outside of the organization using them, and they are accessed over the public Internet. Cloud services is a broad term, referring primarily to data-center-hosted services that are run and accessed over an Internet infrastructure. Until recently, these services have been data-centric, but with the evolution of VoIP (voice over Internet protocol), voice has become part of the cloud phenomenon. Cloud telephony (also known as hosted telephony) refers specifically to voice services and more specifically the replacement of conventional business telephone equipment, such as a private branch exchange (PBX), with third-party VoIP service.

Cloud communications providers deliver voice and data communications applications and services, hosting them on servers that the providers own and maintain, giving their customers access to the “cloud.” Because they only pay for services or applications they use, customers have a more cost-effective, reliable and secure communications environment, without the headaches associated with more conventional PBX system deployment.

Companies can cut costs with cloud communications services without sacrificing features. The success of Google and others as cloud-based providers has demonstrated that a cloud-based platform can be just as effective as a software-based platform, but at a much lower cost. Voice services delivered from the cloud increases the value of hosted telephony, as users can equally well turn to a cloud-based offering instead of relying on a facilities-based service provider for hosted VoIP. This expands their options beyond local or regional carriers.

In the past, businesses have been able to do this for IT services, but not telecommunication. Cloud communications is attractive because the cloud can now become a platform for voice, data and video. Most hosted services have been built around voice, and are usually referred to as hosted VoIP. The cloud communications environment serves as a platform upon which all these modes can seamlessly work as well as integrate.

There are three trends in enterprise communications pushing users to access the cloud and allowing them to do it from any device they choose, a development traditional IT communications infrastructure was not designed to handle. The first trend is increasingly distributed company operations in branches and home offices, making wide area networks cumbersome, inefficient and costly. Second, more communications devices need access to enterprise networks – iPhones, printers and VoIP handsets, for example. Third, data centers housing enterprise IT assets and applications are consolidating and are often being located and managed remotely.

== Applications ==
Cloud telephony services were predominantly used for business processes, such as advertising, e-commerce, human resources, and payments processing. Services were used by distributed call centers and remote workers. The scale of services, features and functionality is expected to evolve even further in the coming years, to embrace mobilisation, facilitate more direct collaboration and streamline communications.

== Potential advantages ==
For a small or medium-sized business, the capital investment to set up VoIP infrastructure in-house could be too high compared to the potential return, but cloud telephony could offer the same services on a lower-cost subscription basis. The cloud telephony provider is also an expert in the technology, whereas a small business is unlikely to have an employee with the same level of expertise, or cannot justify the expense of a full-time telecommunication infrastructure position. Traditional telephony applications required on-premises maintenance, PBX, and a great deal of wiring through a Main Distribution Frame (MDF).

== Cloud Communication Service Providers (CCSP) ==
Organizations and IT Professionals are leveraging a new approach to delivering cloud communications as their employees work remotely or in a hybrid fashion. Gartner has classified this approach as a 'Cloud Communication Service Provider'

== Risks ==
Cloud technology still must exist on physical servers, and the physical location of those servers is important under many nation's laws.

== Products ==
Cloud telephony companies can provide "hosted" (off-site) software versions of services that were previously constructed on-site in hardware. These can also allow the users to be more geographically distributed, since the voice traffic moves over the Internet. Examples include:

- Private branch exchange
- SIP trunking
- Call center
- Fax services
- Interactive voice response
- Text messaging
- Voice broadcast
- Call-tracking software
- Contact center telephony

== See also ==
- Cloud collaboration
- Cloud computing
- Document collaboration
