= 2017 24H Series =

Sports car racing championship season

The 2017 24H Series powered by Hankook was the third season of the 24H Series with drivers battling for championship points and titles and the tenth season since Creventic, the organiser and promoter of the series, organises multiple races a year. The races were contested with GT3-spec cars, GT4-spec cars, sports cars, touring cars and 24H-Specials, like silhouette cars.

== Calendar ==
Round	Event	Circuit	Date	Report
1	24H Dubai	Dubai Autodrome, Dubai, United Arab Emirates	12–14 January	Report
2	12H Mugello	Mugello Circuit, Mugello, Italy	17–18 March	Report
3	12H Red Bull Ring	Red Bull Ring, Spielberg, Austria	7–8 April	Report
4	24H Paul Ricard	Circuit Paul Ricard, Le Castellet, France	5–7 May	Report
5	12H Imola	Autodromo Enzo e Dino Ferrari, Imola, Italy	30 June–1 July	Report
6	24H Portimao	Algarve International Circuit, Portimão, Portugal	25–27 August	Report
NC1	2x5H Spa-Francorchamps	Circuit de Spa-Francorchamps, Spa, Belgium	6–8 October	Report
NC2	2x5H Spa-Francorchamps	Circuit de Spa-Francorchamps, Spa, Belgium	6–8 October	Report
7	24H COTA USA	Circuit of the Americas, Austin, United States	9–11 November	Report

Race is part of the Championship of the Continents
Race is part of the European Championship
Race is part of both the Championship of the Continents and the European Championship
Race is part of both the 24H Series and the 24H Proto Series

== Entry list ==
Team	Car	No.	Drivers	Rounds
A6-Pro
(Switzerland) Hofor-Racing	Mercedes-AMG GT3	1	(Switzerland) Roland Eggimann	5
(Switzerland) Hofor-Racing	Mercedes-AMG GT3	1	(Netherlands) Christiaan Frankenhout	5
(Switzerland) Hofor-Racing	Mercedes-AMG GT3	1	(Germany) Kenneth Heyer	5
(Switzerland) Hofor-Racing	Mercedes-AMG GT3	1	(Switzerland) Chantal Kroll	5
(Switzerland) Hofor-Racing	Mercedes-AMG GT3	1	(Switzerland) Michael Kroll	5
(Switzerland) Hofor-Racing powered by Car Collection (Note: Car No. 1 entered as Hofor-Racing powered by Car Collection and car No. 32 entered as Car Collection Motorsport.) (Germany) Car Collection Motorsport	Mercedes-AMG GT3	1	(Netherlands) Christiaan Frankenhout	7
(Switzerland) Hofor-Racing powered by Car Collection (Germany) Car Collection Motorsport	Mercedes-AMG GT3	1	(Germany) Kenneth Heyer	7
(Switzerland) Hofor-Racing powered by Car Collection (Germany) Car Collection Motorsport	Mercedes-AMG GT3	1	(Switzerland) Chantal Kroll	7
(Switzerland) Hofor-Racing powered by Car Collection (Germany) Car Collection Motorsport	Mercedes-AMG GT3	1	(Switzerland) Michael Kroll	7
(Switzerland) Hofor-Racing powered by Car Collection (Germany) Car Collection Motorsport	Mercedes-AMG GT3	1	(Germany) Jörg Viebahn	7
(Switzerland) Hofor-Racing powered by Car Collection (Germany) Car Collection Motorsport	Audi R8 LMS	32	(Germany) Max Edelhoff	2
(Switzerland) Hofor-Racing powered by Car Collection (Germany) Car Collection Motorsport	Audi R8 LMS	32	(Austria) Horst Felbermayr Jr.	2
(Switzerland) Hofor-Racing powered by Car Collection (Germany) Car Collection Motorsport	Audi R8 LMS	32	(Spain) Toni Forné	2
(Switzerland) Hofor-Racing powered by Car Collection (Germany) Car Collection Motorsport	Audi R8 LMS	32	(Germany) Peter Schmidt	2
(Switzerland) Hofor-Racing powered by Car Collection (Germany) Car Collection Motorsport	Audi R8 LMS	32	(Switzerland) Adrian Amstutz	4
(Switzerland) Hofor-Racing powered by Car Collection (Germany) Car Collection Motorsport	Audi R8 LMS	32	(Croatia) Martin Kodrić	4
(Switzerland) Hofor-Racing powered by Car Collection (Germany) Car Collection Motorsport	Audi R8 LMS	32	(Finland) Patrick Kujala	4
(Switzerland) Hofor-Racing powered by Car Collection (Germany) Car Collection Motorsport	Audi R8 LMS	32	(United States) Connor De Phillippi	4
(Germany) Black Falcon	Mercedes-AMG GT3	2	(Germany) Patrick Assenheimer	1
(Germany) Black Falcon	Mercedes-AMG GT3	2	(Netherlands) Jeroen Bleekemolen	1
(Germany) Black Falcon	Mercedes-AMG GT3	2	(Germany) Manuel Metzger	1
(Germany) Black Falcon	Mercedes-AMG GT3	2	(United Arab Emirates) Khaled Al Qubaisi	1
(Germany) Black Falcon	Mercedes-AMG GT3	3	(Saudi Arabia) Abdulaziz Al Faisal	1, 7
(Germany) Black Falcon	Mercedes-AMG GT3	3	(Poland) Michał Broniszewski	1
(Germany) Black Falcon	Mercedes-AMG GT3	3	(Netherlands) Yelmer Buurman	1
(Germany) Black Falcon	Mercedes-AMG GT3	3	(Germany) Maro Engel	1
(Germany) Black Falcon	Mercedes-AMG GT3	3	(Germany) Hubert Haupt	1
(Germany) Black Falcon	Mercedes-AMG GT3	3	(Netherlands) Jeroen Bleekemolen	7
(Germany) Black Falcon	Mercedes-AMG GT3	3	(United States) Ben Keating	7
(Germany) Black Falcon	Mercedes-AMG GT3	3	(Germany) Luca Stolz	7
(Belgium) Belgian Audi Club WRT	Audi R8 LMS	4	(Netherlands) Robin Frijns	1
(Belgium) Belgian Audi Club WRT	Audi R8 LMS	4	(Belgium) Enzo Ide	1
(Belgium) Belgian Audi Club WRT	Audi R8 LMS	4	(United Kingdom) Stuart Leonard	1
(Belgium) Belgian Audi Club WRT	Audi R8 LMS	4	(Belgium) Ruben Maes	1
(Belgium) Belgian Audi Club WRT	Audi R8 LMS	4	(Germany) Christopher Mies	1
(Austria) HB Racing	Lamborghini Huracán GT3	7	(Italy) Andrea Amici	1
(Austria) HB Racing	Lamborghini Huracán GT3	7	(Austria) Herbert Handlos	1
(Austria) HB Racing	Lamborghini Huracán GT3	7	(Austria) Norbert Siedler	1
(Austria) HB Racing	Lamborghini Huracán GT3	7	(Germany) Florian Spengler	1
(Austria) HB Racing	Lamborghini Huracán GT3	7	(United Kingdom) Sam Tordoff	1
(Czech Republic) Scuderia Praha	Ferrari 488 GT3	11	(Czech Republic) Josef Král	2–6
(Czech Republic) Scuderia Praha	Ferrari 488 GT3	11	(Czech Republic) Jiří Písařík	2–6
(Czech Republic) Scuderia Praha	Ferrari 488 GT3	11	(Italy) Matteo Malucelli	2–4, 6
(Czech Republic) Scuderia Praha	Ferrari 488 GT3	11	(Italy) Eddie Cheever III	4
(Germany) Manthey Racing	Porsche 991 GT3 R	12	(Italy) Matteo Cairoli	1
(Germany) Manthey Racing	Porsche 991 GT3 R	12	(Germany) Otto Klohs	1
(Germany) Manthey Racing	Porsche 991 GT3 R	12	(Germany) Jochen Krumbach	1
(Germany) Manthey Racing	Porsche 991 GT3 R	12	(Germany) Sven Müller	1
(Germany) Manthey Racing	Porsche 991 GT3 R	13	(Norway) Dennis Olsen	7
(Germany) Manthey Racing	Porsche 991 GT3 R	13	(Austria) Hari Proczyk	7
(Germany) Manthey Racing	Porsche 991 GT3 R	13	(Switzerland) Steve Smith	7
(Germany) Manthey Racing	Porsche 991 GT3 R	13	(Germany) Randy Walls	7
(United Kingdom) Optimum Motorsport	Audi R8 LMS	14	(Germany) Christopher Haase	1
(United Kingdom) Optimum Motorsport	Audi R8 LMS	14	(United Kingdom) Flick Haigh	1
(United Kingdom) Optimum Motorsport	Audi R8 LMS	14	(United Kingdom) Joe Osborne	1
(United Kingdom) Optimum Motorsport	Audi R8 LMS	14	(United Kingdom) Ryan Ratcliffe	1
(Germany) SPS automotive performance	Mercedes-AMG GT3	16	(Germany) Lance David Arnold	1
(Germany) SPS automotive performance	Mercedes-AMG GT3	16	(Germany) Tim Müller	1
(Germany) SPS automotive performance	Mercedes-AMG GT3	16	(United Kingdom) Tom Onslow-Cole	1
(Germany) SPS automotive performance	Mercedes-AMG GT3	16	(Germany) Valentin Pierburg	1
(France) IDEC SPORT RACING	Mercedes-AMG GT3	17	(France) Dimitri Enjalbert	2–5, 7
(France) IDEC SPORT RACING	Mercedes-AMG GT3	17	(France) Patrice Lafargue	2–5, 7
(France) IDEC SPORT RACING	Mercedes-AMG GT3	17	(France) Paul Lafargue	2–5, 7
(France) IDEC SPORT RACING	Mercedes-AMG GT3	17	(France) Alban Varutti	4, 7
(Austria) Konrad Motorsport	Lamborghini Huracán GT3	21	(Italy) Marco Mapelli	1–2, 6
(Austria) Konrad Motorsport	Lamborghini Huracán GT3	21	(Germany) Paul Scheuschner	1, 6
(Austria) Konrad Motorsport	Lamborghini Huracán GT3	21	(Germany) Marc Basseng	1
(Austria) Konrad Motorsport	Lamborghini Huracán GT3	21	(France) Jules Gounon	1
(Austria) Konrad Motorsport	Lamborghini Huracán GT3	21	(Germany) Luca Stolz	1
(Austria) Konrad Motorsport	Lamborghini Huracán GT3	21	(Austria) Franz Konrad	2, 6
(Austria) Konrad Motorsport	Lamborghini Huracán GT3	21	(Switzerland) Giorgio Maggi	2
(Austria) Konrad Motorsport	Lamborghini Huracán GT3	21	(Austria) Christopher Zöchling	2
(Austria) Konrad Motorsport	Lamborghini Huracán GT3	21	(Germany) Christopher Brück	6
(Austria) Konrad Motorsport	Lamborghini Huracán GT3	21	(Germany) Hendrik Still	6
(Germany) SPS automotive performance	Mercedes-AMG GT3	24	(Switzerland) Iradj Alexander	3–4
(Germany) SPS automotive performance	Mercedes-AMG GT3	24	(Switzerland) Alexandre Coigny	3–4
(Germany) SPS automotive performance	Mercedes-AMG GT3	24	(Switzerland) Richard Feller	3–4
(Germany) SPS automotive performance	Mercedes-AMG GT3	24	(United States) Tom Dyer	4
(Germany) HTP Motorsport	Mercedes-AMG GT3	25	(Netherlands) Wim de Pundert	2–3
(Germany) HTP Motorsport	Mercedes-AMG GT3	25	(Luxembourg) Brice Bosi	2
(Germany) HTP Motorsport	Mercedes-AMG GT3	25	(Germany) Bernd Schneider	2
(Germany) HTP Motorsport	Mercedes-AMG GT3	25	(Sweden) Jimmy Eriksson	3
(Germany) HTP Motorsport	Mercedes-AMG GT3	25	(Germany) Fabian Schiller	3
(United Arab Emirates) GP Extreme	Renault R.S. 01 FGT3	28	(Canada) Bassam Kronfli	1, 4
(United Arab Emirates) GP Extreme	Renault R.S. 01 FGT3	28	(South Africa) Jordan Grogor	1, 6
(United Arab Emirates) GP Extreme	Renault R.S. 01 FGT3	28	(Switzerland) Louis Delétraz	1
(United Arab Emirates) GP Extreme	Renault R.S. 01 FGT3	28	(France) Jean-Éric Vergne	1
(United Arab Emirates) GP Extreme	Renault R.S. 01 FGT3	28	(United Kingdom) Josh Webster	1
(United Arab Emirates) GP Extreme	Renault R.S. 01 FGT3	28	(Zimbabwe) Axcil Jefferies	4, 6
(United Arab Emirates) GP Extreme	Renault R.S. 01 FGT3	28	(France) Pierre Brice Mena	4, 6
(United Arab Emirates) GP Extreme	Renault R.S. 01 FGT3	28	(France) Jean-Pierre Valentini	4, 6
(United Arab Emirates) GP Extreme	Renault R.S. 01 FGT3	28	(France) Anthony Beltoise	4
(United Arab Emirates) GP Extreme	Renault R.S. 01 FGT3	28	(Netherlands) Nicky Pastorelli	6
(Poland) Förch Racing powered by Olimp	Porsche 991 GT3 R	29	(Poland) Robert Lukas	1–3, 5
(Poland) Förch Racing powered by Olimp	Porsche 991 GT3 R	29	(Poland) Marcin Jedliński	1–2
(Poland) Förch Racing powered by Olimp	Porsche 991 GT3 R	29	(Mexico) Santiago Creel	1
(Poland) Förch Racing powered by Olimp	Porsche 991 GT3 R	29	(Germany) Wolf Henzler	1
(Poland) Förch Racing powered by Olimp	Porsche 991 GT3 R	29	(Poland) Robert Kubica	1
(Poland) Förch Racing powered by Olimp	Porsche 991 GT3 R	29	(Germany) Patrick Eisemann	2–3, 5
(Poland) Förch Racing powered by Olimp	Porsche 991 GT3 R	29	(Austria) Željko Drmić	3, 5
(United Kingdom) Ram Racing	Mercedes-AMG GT3	30	(United Kingdom) Tom Onslow-Cole	2, 5
(United Kingdom) Ram Racing	Mercedes-AMG GT3	30	(Netherlands) Remon Leonard Vos	2, 5
(United Kingdom) Ram Racing	Mercedes-AMG GT3	30	(Netherlands) Kevin Veltman	2
(United Kingdom) ROFGO Racing	Mercedes-AMG GT3	31	(United Kingdom) Jamie Campbell-Walter	4, 7
(United Kingdom) ROFGO Racing	Mercedes-AMG GT3	31	(Germany) Roald Goethe	4, 7
(United Kingdom) ROFGO Racing	Mercedes-AMG GT3	31	(United Kingdom) Stuart Hall	4, 7
(United Kingdom) ROFGO Racing	Mercedes-AMG GT3	31	(France) Nicolas Minassian	4, 7
(Austria) MS Racing	Mercedes-AMG GT3	38	(Austria) Edward Lewis Brauner	2
(Austria) MS Racing	Mercedes-AMG GT3	38	(Austria) Željko Drmić	2
(Austria) MS Racing	Mercedes-AMG GT3	38	(Austria) Alexander Hrachowina	2
(Austria) MS Racing	Mercedes-AMG GT3	38	(Austria) Martin Konrad	2
(France) IMSA Performance	Porsche 991 GT3 R	76	(France) Thierry Cornac	1
(France) IMSA Performance	Porsche 991 GT3 R	76	(France) Mathieu Jaminet	1
(France) IMSA Performance	Porsche 991 GT3 R	76	(France) Maxime Jousse	1
(France) IMSA Performance	Porsche 991 GT3 R	76	(France) Raymond Narac	1
(Switzerland) Octane 126	Ferrari 488 GT3	488	(Germany) Björn Grossmann	2
(Switzerland) Octane 126	Ferrari 488 GT3	488	(Switzerland) Fabio Leimer	2
(Germany) Wochenspiegel Team Monschau	Ferrari 488 GT3	488	(Germany) Oliver Kainz	6
(Germany) Wochenspiegel Team Monschau	Ferrari 488 GT3	488	(Germany) Jochen Krumbach	6
(Germany) Wochenspiegel Team Monschau	Ferrari 488 GT3	488	(Germany) Nico Menzel	6
(Germany) Wochenspiegel Team Monschau	Ferrari 488 GT3	488	(Germany) Georg Weiss	6
(Germany) Herberth Motorsport	Porsche 991 GT3 R	911	(Switzerland) Daniel Allemann	1–5, 7
(Germany) Herberth Motorsport	Porsche 991 GT3 R	911	(Germany) Alfred Renauer	1–5, 7
(Germany) Herberth Motorsport	Porsche 991 GT3 R	911	(Germany) Robert Renauer	1–5, 7
(Germany) Herberth Motorsport	Porsche 991 GT3 R	911	(Germany) Ralf Bohn	1–2, 4–5, 7
(Germany) Herberth Motorsport	Porsche 991 GT3 R	911	(New Zealand) Brendon Hartley	1
(Austria) GRT Grasser Racing Team	Lamborghini Huracán GT3	963	(Netherlands) Rik Breukers	1, 6
(Austria) GRT Grasser Racing Team	Lamborghini Huracán GT3	963	(Italy) Mirko Bortolotti	1
(Austria) GRT Grasser Racing Team	Lamborghini Huracán GT3	963	(Germany) Christian Engelhart	1
(Austria) GRT Grasser Racing Team	Lamborghini Huracán GT3	963	(Switzerland) Mark Ineichen	1
(Austria) GRT Grasser Racing Team	Lamborghini Huracán GT3	963	(Switzerland) Rolf Ineichen	1
(Austria) GRT Grasser Racing Team	Lamborghini Huracán GT3	963	(Switzerland) Mauro Calamia	6
(Austria) GRT Grasser Racing Team	Lamborghini Huracán GT3	963	(Switzerland) Christoph Lenz	6
(Austria) GRT Grasser Racing Team	Lamborghini Huracán GT3	963	(Italy) Roberto Pampanini	6
(Austria) GRT Grasser Racing Team	Lamborghini Huracán GT3	963	(Serbia) Miloš Pavlović	6
(Austria) GRT Grasser Racing Team	Lamborghini Huracán GT3	964	(Germany) Christian Engelhart	1, 3
(Austria) GRT Grasser Racing Team	Lamborghini Huracán GT3	964	(Switzerland) Rolf Ineichen	1, 3
(Austria) GRT Grasser Racing Team	Lamborghini Huracán GT3	964	(Switzerland) Adrian Amstutz	1
(Austria) GRT Grasser Racing Team	Lamborghini Huracán GT3	964	(Italy) Mirko Bortolotti	1
(Austria) GRT Grasser Racing Team	Lamborghini Huracán GT3	964	(Argentina) Ezequiel Pérez Companc	1
(Austria) GRT Grasser Racing Team	Lamborghini Huracán GT3	964	(Switzerland) Mark Ineichen	3
A6-Am
(Switzerland) Hofor-Racing	Mercedes-AMG GT3	1	(Switzerland) Roland Eggimann	1–4, 6
(Switzerland) Hofor-Racing	Mercedes-AMG GT3	1	(Netherlands) Christiaan Frankenhout	1–4, 6
(Switzerland) Hofor-Racing	Mercedes-AMG GT3	1	(Germany) Kenneth Heyer	1–4, 6
(Switzerland) Hofor-Racing	Mercedes-AMG GT3	1	(Switzerland) Chantal Kroll	1–4, 6
(Switzerland) Hofor-Racing	Mercedes-AMG GT3	1	(Switzerland) Michael Kroll	1–4, 6
(Belgium) Belgian Audi Club WRT	Audi R8 LMS	5	(Switzerland) Marcel Fässler	1
(Belgium) Belgian Audi Club WRT	Audi R8 LMS	5	(Saudi Arabia) Mohammed Bin Faisal Al Saud	1
(Belgium) Belgian Audi Club WRT	Audi R8 LMS	5	(Saudi Arabia) Mohammed Bin Saud Al Saud	1
(Belgium) Belgian Audi Club WRT	Audi R8 LMS	5	(Netherlands) Michael Vergers	1
(Germany) SPS automotive performance	Mercedes-AMG GT3	16	(Germany) Jürgen Krebs	2
(Germany) SPS automotive performance	Mercedes-AMG GT3	16	(Germany) Tim Müller	2
(Germany) SPS automotive performance	Mercedes-AMG GT3	16	(Germany) Valentin Pierburg	2
(Germany) SPS automotive performance	Mercedes-AMG GT3	24	(Switzerland) Iradj Alexander	2, 5
(Germany) SPS automotive performance	Mercedes-AMG GT3	24	(Switzerland) Alexandre Coigny	2, 5
(Germany) SPS automotive performance	Mercedes-AMG GT3	24	(Switzerland) Richard Feller	2, 5
(France) IDEC SPORT RACING	Mercedes-AMG GT3	17	(France) Patrice Lafargue	1
(France) IDEC SPORT RACING	Mercedes-AMG GT3	17	(France) Paul Lafargue	1
(France) IDEC SPORT RACING	Mercedes-AMG GT3	17	(France) Nicolas Minassian	1
(France) IDEC SPORT RACING	Mercedes-AMG GT3	17	(France) Alban Varutti	1
(Netherlands) V8 Racing	Chevrolet Corvette C6.R ZR1	18	(Netherlands) Rick Abresch	1, 7
(Netherlands) V8 Racing	Chevrolet Corvette C6.R ZR1	18	(Netherlands) Luc Braams	1, 7
(Netherlands) V8 Racing	Chevrolet Corvette C6.R ZR1	18	(Netherlands) Alex van 't Hoff	1, 7
(Netherlands) V8 Racing	Chevrolet Corvette C6.R ZR1	18	(Netherlands) Duncan Huisman	1, 7
(Netherlands) V8 Racing	Chevrolet Corvette C6.R ZR1	18	(Netherlands) Wolf Nathan	1
(Netherlands) V8 Racing	Chevrolet Corvette C6.R ZR1	18	(Belgium) Nicolas Vandierendonck	7
(Mexico) De La Torre Racing	Aston Martin Vantage GT3	20	(Mexico) Jorge De La Torre	7
(Mexico) De La Torre Racing	Aston Martin Vantage GT3	20	(United Kingdom) Ross Gunn	7
(Mexico) De La Torre Racing	Aston Martin Vantage GT3	20	(South Korea) Tacksung Kim	7
(Mexico) De La Torre Racing	Aston Martin Vantage GT3	20	(United States) Mark Kvamme	7
(Belgium) Gravity Racing International	Mercedes-Benz SLS AMG GT3	22	(Czech Republic) Jarek Janiš	1
(Belgium) Gravity Racing International	Mercedes-Benz SLS AMG GT3	22	(Luxembourg) Christian Kelders	1
(Belgium) Gravity Racing International	Mercedes-Benz SLS AMG GT3	22	(Spain) Gérard Lopez	1
(Belgium) Gravity Racing International	Mercedes-Benz SLS AMG GT3	22	(Belgium) Vincent Radermecker	1
(Germany) HTP Motorsport	Mercedes-AMG GT3	25	(Luxembourg) Brice Bosi	1
(Germany) HTP Motorsport	Mercedes-AMG GT3	25	(Netherlands) Wim de Pundert	1
(Germany) HTP Motorsport	Mercedes-AMG GT3	25	(Germany) Bernd Schneider	1
(Germany) HTP Motorsport	Mercedes-AMG GT3	25	(Germany) Carsten Tilke	1
(United Arab Emirates) GP Extreme	Renault R.S. 01 FGT3	27	(Ivory Coast) Frédéric Fatien	1–6
(United Arab Emirates) GP Extreme	Renault R.S. 01 FGT3	27	(Switzerland) Tiziano Carugati	1–2, 4, 6
(United Arab Emirates) GP Extreme	Renault R.S. 01 FGT3	27	(Netherlands) Nicky Pastorelli	1, 4-6
(United Arab Emirates) GP Extreme	Renault R.S. 01 FGT3	27	(United Kingdom) Stuart Hall	1, 6
(United Arab Emirates) GP Extreme	Renault R.S. 01 FGT3	27	(South Africa) Jordan Grogor	2–5
(United Arab Emirates) GP Extreme	Renault R.S. 01 FGT3	27	(Canada) Bassam Kronfli	3–4, 6
(United Arab Emirates) GP Extreme	Renault R.S. 01 FGT3	28	(Switzerland) Tiziano Carugati	5
(United Arab Emirates) GP Extreme	Renault R.S. 01 FGT3	28	(Canada) Bassam Kronfli	5
(United Arab Emirates) GP Extreme	Renault R.S. 01 FGT3	28	(France) Jean-Pierre Valentini	5
(Poland) Förch Racing powered by Olimp	Porsche 991 GT3 R	29	(Germany) Edward Lewis Brauner	6
(Poland) Förch Racing powered by Olimp	Porsche 991 GT3 R	29	(Austria) Željko Drmić	6
(Poland) Förch Racing powered by Olimp	Porsche 991 GT3 R	29	(Germany) Patrick Eisemann	6
(Poland) Förch Racing powered by Olimp	Porsche 991 GT3 R	29	(Germany) Wolf Henzler	6
(Germany) Car Collection Motorsport	Audi R8 LMS	32	(Germany) Max Edelhoff	3, 5
(Germany) Car Collection Motorsport	Audi R8 LMS	32	(Austria) Horst Felbermayr Jr.	3, 5–6
(Germany) Car Collection Motorsport	Audi R8 LMS	32	(Spain) Toni Forné	3, 5–6
(Germany) Car Collection Motorsport	Audi R8 LMS	32	(Germany) Dimitri Parhofer	5
(Germany) Car Collection Motorsport	Audi R8 LMS	32	(Germany) Klaus Koch	6
(Germany) Car Collection Motorsport	Audi R8 LMS	32	(Germany) Henry Littig	6
(Germany) Car Collection Motorsport	Audi R8 LMS	32	(Germany) Peter Schmidt	6
(Germany) Car Collection Motorsport	Audi R8 LMS	33	(Germany) Dimitri Parhofer	1–4, 7
(Germany) Car Collection Motorsport	Audi R8 LMS	33	(Germany) Peter Schmidt	1, 3, 7
(Germany) Car Collection Motorsport	Audi R8 LMS	33	(Spain) Toni Forné	1, 4
(Germany) Car Collection Motorsport	Audi R8 LMS	33	(Spain) Daniel Diaz Varela	1
(Germany) Car Collection Motorsport	Audi R8 LMS	33	(Spain) Isaac Tutumlu	1
(Germany) Car Collection Motorsport	Audi R8 LMS	33	(Germany) Dirg Parhofer	2–4
(Germany) Car Collection Motorsport	Audi R8 LMS	33	(South Africa) Kelvin van der Linde	2
(Germany) Car Collection Motorsport	Audi R8 LMS	33	(Germany) Johannes Siegler	2
(Germany) Car Collection Motorsport	Audi R8 LMS	33	(Switzerland) Rahel Frey	3–4
(Germany) Car Collection Motorsport	Audi R8 LMS	33	(France) Rémi Terrail	4
(Germany) Car Collection Motorsport	Audi R8 LMS	33	(Germany) Stefan Aust	7
(Germany) Car Collection Motorsport	Audi R8 LMS	33	(Germany) Christian Bollrath	7
(Germany) Car Collection Motorsport	Audi R8 LMS	33	(Germany) Pierre Ehret	7
(Germany) Car Collection Motorsport	Audi R8 LMS	34	(Germany) Gustav Edelhoff	All
(Germany) Car Collection Motorsport	Audi R8 LMS	34	(Germany) Elmar Grimm	All
(Germany) Car Collection Motorsport	Audi R8 LMS	34	(Germany) Ingo Vogler	All
(Germany) Car Collection Motorsport	Audi R8 LMS	34	(Germany) Johannes Kirchhoff	1–5, 7
(Germany) Car Collection Motorsport	Audi R8 LMS	34	(Germany) Max Edelhoff	1, 4, 6–7
(Germany) Car Collection Motorsport	Audi R8 LMS	34	(Switzerland) Rahel Frey	6
(Germany) Raeder Motorsport	Audi R8 LMS ultra	36	(Germany) Markus Oestreich	2
(Germany) Raeder Motorsport	Audi R8 LMS ultra	36	(Germany) Markus von Oeynhausen	2
(Germany) Raeder Motorsport	Audi R8 LMS ultra	36	(Germany) Heinz Schmersal	2
(Germany) MDC-Sports	Mercedes-AMG GT3	44	(Switzerland) Adrian Zumstein	5
(Germany) MDC-Sports	Mercedes-AMG GT3	44	(Switzerland) Manuel Zumstein	5
(Germany) MDC-Sports	Mercedes-AMG GT3	44	(Switzerland) Philip Zumstein	5
(Germany) Attempto Racing	Porsche 991 GT3 R	66	(Germany) Mike Hansch	1
(Germany) Attempto Racing	Porsche 991 GT3 R	66	(Germany) Jürgen Häring	1
(Germany) Attempto Racing	Porsche 991 GT3 R	66	(Germany) Peter Terting	1
(Germany) Attempto Racing	Porsche 991 GT3 R	66	(Germany) Dietmar Ulrich	1
(Germany) Attempto Racing	Porsche 991 GT3 R	66	(Germany) Philipp Wlazik	1
(Germany) Herberth Motorsport	Porsche 991 GT3 R	911	(Switzerland) Daniel Allemann	6
(Germany) Herberth Motorsport	Porsche 991 GT3 R	911	(Germany) Ralf Bohn	6
(Germany) Herberth Motorsport	Porsche 991 GT3 R	911	(Germany) Alfred Renauer	6
(Germany) Herberth Motorsport	Porsche 991 GT3 R	911	(Germany) Robert Renauer	6
(Austria) GRT Grasser Racing Team	Lamborghini Huracán GT3	963	(Switzerland) Christoph Lenz	2–3, 5
(Austria) GRT Grasser Racing Team	Lamborghini Huracán GT3	963	(Italy) Roberto Pampanini	2–3, 5
(Austria) GRT Grasser Racing Team	Lamborghini Huracán GT3	963	(Serbia) Miloš Pavlović	2–3, 5
(Austria) GRT Grasser Racing Team	Lamborghini Huracán GT3	963	(Switzerland) Mark Ineichen	2–3
SPX
(Germany) Leipert Motorsport	Lamborghini Huracán Super Trofeo	10	(Germany) Harald Schlotter	1, 5, 7
(Germany) Leipert Motorsport	Lamborghini Huracán Super Trofeo	10	(Canada) Jean-Charles Perrin	1
(Germany) Leipert Motorsport	Lamborghini Huracán Super Trofeo	10	(United Kingdom) Jake Rattenbury	1
(Germany) Leipert Motorsport	Lamborghini Huracán Super Trofeo	10	(United Kingdom) Oliver Webb	1
(Germany) Leipert Motorsport	Lamborghini Huracán Super Trofeo	10	(Norway) Aleksander Schjerpen	5, 7
(Germany) Leipert Motorsport	Lamborghini Huracán Super Trofeo	10	(Greece) Dimitri Deverikos	5
(Germany) Leipert Motorsport	Lamborghini Huracán Super Trofeo	10	(Australia) Morgan Haber	5
(Germany) Leipert Motorsport	Lamborghini Huracán Super Trofeo	10	(Germany) John-Louis Jasper	7
(Germany) Leipert Motorsport	Lamborghini Huracán Super Trofeo	10	(Belgium) Niels Lagrange	7
(Germany) Leipert Motorsport	Lamborghini Huracán Super Trofeo	10	(United States) Vic Rice	7
(Netherlands) Eurotrac by Bas Koeten	Dodge Viper CC Series 2	19	(Netherlands) Ivo Breukers	1
(Netherlands) Eurotrac by Bas Koeten	Dodge Viper CC Series 2	19	(Netherlands) Bert de Heus	1
(Netherlands) Eurotrac by Bas Koeten	Dodge Viper CC Series 2	19	(Netherlands) Daniël de Jong	1
(Netherlands) Eurotrac by Bas Koeten	Dodge Viper CC Series 2	19	(Netherlands) Leon Rijnbeek	1
(France) COOL RACING BY GPC MOTORSPORT	Vortex 1.0	24	(Switzerland) Iradj Alexander	1
(France) COOL RACING BY GPC MOTORSPORT	Vortex 1.0	24	(Switzerland) Alexandre Coigny	1
(France) COOL RACING BY GPC MOTORSPORT	Vortex 1.0	24	(United States) Tom Dyer	1
(France) COOL RACING BY GPC MOTORSPORT	Vortex 1.0	24	(Switzerland) Gino Forgione	1
(Switzerland) FACH AUTO TECH	Porsche 991 Cup MR	51	(Switzerland) Heinz Bruder	1
(Switzerland) FACH AUTO TECH	Porsche 991 Cup MR	51	(Switzerland) Thomas Fleischer	1
(Switzerland) FACH AUTO TECH	Porsche 991 Cup MR	51	(Switzerland) Peter Joos	1
(Switzerland) FACH AUTO TECH	Porsche 991 Cup MR	51	(Austria) Martin Ragginger	1
(Switzerland) FACH AUTO TECH	Porsche 991 Cup MR	51	(Switzerland) Marcel Wagner	1
(Austria) True-Racing	KTM X-Bow GT4 (in development)	56	(Austria) Klaus Angerhofer	2–3
(Austria) True-Racing	KTM X-Bow GT4 (in development)	56	(Austria) Reinhard Kofler	2–3
(Austria) True-Racing	KTM X-Bow GT4 (in development)	56	(Austria) Hubert Trunkenpolz	2–3
(Austria) True-Racing	KTM X-Bow GT4 (in development)	56	(Czech Republic) Tomáš Enge	2
(Singapore) GDL Racing Team Asia (Note: Car No. 77 entered as GDL Racing Team Asia and car No. 87 entered as GDL Racing Middle East.) (United Arab Emirates) GDL Racing Middle East	Lamborghini Huracán Super Trofeo	77	(Hong Kong) Nigel Farmer	1
(Singapore) GDL Racing Team Asia (United Arab Emirates) GDL Racing Middle East	Lamborghini Huracán Super Trofeo	77	(Singapore) Bruce Lee	1
(Singapore) GDL Racing Team Asia (United Arab Emirates) GDL Racing Middle East	Lamborghini Huracán Super Trofeo	77	(Singapore) Keong Liam Lim	1
(Singapore) GDL Racing Team Asia (United Arab Emirates) GDL Racing Middle East	Lamborghini Huracán Super Trofeo	77	(Singapore) Gerald Tan	1
(Singapore) GDL Racing Team Asia (United Arab Emirates) GDL Racing Middle East	Lamborghini Huracán Super Trofeo	87	(United States) Vic Rice	1–2
(Singapore) GDL Racing Team Asia (United Arab Emirates) GDL Racing Middle East	Lamborghini Huracán Super Trofeo	87	(Germany) Pierre Ehret	1
(Singapore) GDL Racing Team Asia (United Arab Emirates) GDL Racing Middle East	Lamborghini Huracán Super Trofeo	87	(France) Franck Pelle	1
(Singapore) GDL Racing Team Asia (United Arab Emirates) GDL Racing Middle East	Lamborghini Huracán Super Trofeo	87	(Finland) Rory Penttinen	1
(Singapore) GDL Racing Team Asia (United Arab Emirates) GDL Racing Middle East	Lamborghini Huracán Super Trofeo	87	(Netherlands) Rik Breukers	2
(Singapore) GDL Racing Team Asia (United Arab Emirates) GDL Racing Middle East	Lamborghini Huracán Super Trofeo	87	(Switzerland) Mario Cordoni	2
(Belgium) Speed Lover	Porsche 991 GT3 Cup	78	(Belgium) Pierre-Yves Paque	NC1–2
(Belgium) Speed Lover	Porsche 991 GT3 Cup	78	(Luxembourg) Carlos Rivas	NC1–2
(Belgium) Speed Lover	Porsche 991 GT3 Cup	78	(Luxembourg) Bob Wilwert	NC1–2
(Belgium) Speed Lover	Porsche 991 GT3 Cup	79	(United States) Dominique Bastien	NC1–2
(Belgium) Speed Lover	Porsche 991 GT3 Cup	79	(Belgium) Vincent Despriet	NC1–2
(Belgium) Speed Lover	Porsche 991 GT3 Cup	79	(Belgium) Pieter Vanneste	NC1–2
(France) Vortex V8	Vortex 1.0	204	(France) Lionel Amrouche	1–4, 6
(France) Vortex V8	Vortex 1.0	204	(France) Cyril Calmon	1–4, 6
(France) Vortex V8	Vortex 1.0	204	(France) Arnaud Gomez	1–2
(France) Vortex V8	Vortex 1.0	204	(France) Olivier Gomez	1
(France) Vortex V8	Vortex 1.0	204	(France) Philippe Gruau	2
(France) Vortex V8	Vortex 1.0	204	(Belgium) Amaury Bonduel	3–4
(France) Vortex V8	Vortex 1.0	204	(Monaco) Alain Costa	4
(France) Vortex V8	Vortex 1.0	204	(Denmark) Martin Hald Gøtsche	6
(France) Vortex V8	Vortex 1.0	204	(Denmark) Nanna Hald Gøtsche	6
(Germany) Schubert Motorsport	BMW M4 GT4	401	(United Kingdom) Ricky Collard	1
(Germany) Schubert Motorsport	BMW M4 GT4	401	(Germany) Jens Klingmann	1
(Germany) Schubert Motorsport	BMW M4 GT4	401	(Germany) Jörg Müller	1
991
(United Kingdom) Slidesports Pallex	Porsche 991 GT3 Cup	47	(United Kingdom) Nigel Armstrong	7
(United Kingdom) Slidesports Pallex	Porsche 991 GT3 Cup	47	(United Kingdom) Dave Fairbrother	7
(United Kingdom) Slidesports Pallex	Porsche 991 GT3 Cup	47	(United Kingdom) Graeme Mundy	7
(United Kingdom) Slidesports Pallex	Porsche 991 GT3 Cup	47	(United Kingdom) Colin Paton	7
(United States) Freem USA	Porsche 991-II GT3 Cup	50	(New Zealand) Sam Fillmore	7
(United States) Freem USA	Porsche 991-II GT3 Cup	50	(Australia) Stephen Grove	7
(United States) Freem USA	Porsche 991-II GT3 Cup	50	(Australia) Danny Stutterd	7
(Germany) race:pro motorsport	Porsche 991 GT3 Cup	63	(Austria) Klaus Bachler	1
(Germany) race:pro motorsport	Porsche 991 GT3 Cup	63	(Russia) Stanislav Minsky	1
(Germany) race:pro motorsport	Porsche 991 GT3 Cup	63	(Luxembourg) Carlos Rivas	1
(Germany) race:pro motorsport	Porsche 991 GT3 Cup	63	(Russia) Murad Sultanov	1
(Germany) race:pro motorsport	Porsche 991 GT3 Cup	63	(Germany) Mark Wallenwein	1
(Poland) / Olimp Racing by Lukas Motorsport (Note: Car No. 67 entered as Olimp Racing by Lukas Motorsport and car No. 81 entered as Förch Racing powered by Olimp.); (Poland) / Förch Racing powered by Olimp (Note: Car No. 81 entered as Olimp Racing by Lukas Motorsport at the 24H Dubai (Rnd 1).)	Porsche 991 GT3 Cup	67	(Germany) Chris Bauer	2–3
(Poland) / Olimp Racing by Lukas Motorsport; (Poland) / Förch Racing powered by Olimp	Porsche 991 GT3 Cup	67	(Poland) Igor Waliłko	2–3
(Poland) / Olimp Racing by Lukas Motorsport; (Poland) / Förch Racing powered by Olimp	Porsche 991 GT3 Cup	67	(Poland) Stanislav Jedliński	2
(Poland) / Olimp Racing by Lukas Motorsport; (Poland) / Förch Racing powered by Olimp	Porsche 991 GT3 Cup	67	(Poland) Robert Lukas	2
(Poland) / Olimp Racing by Lukas Motorsport; (Poland) / Förch Racing powered by Olimp	Porsche 991 GT3 Cup	67	(Mexico) Santiago Creel	3
(Poland) / Olimp Racing by Lukas Motorsport; (Poland) / Förch Racing powered by Olimp	Porsche 991 GT3 Cup	67	(Poland) Piotr Wójcik	3
(Poland) / Olimp Racing by Lukas Motorsport; (Poland) / Förch Racing powered by Olimp	Porsche 991 GT3 Cup	81	(Germany) Chris Bauer	1, 3
(Poland) / Olimp Racing by Lukas Motorsport; (Poland) / Förch Racing powered by Olimp	Porsche 991 GT3 Cup	81	(Poland) Igor Waliłko	1, 3
(Poland) / Olimp Racing by Lukas Motorsport; (Poland) / Förch Racing powered by Olimp	Porsche 991 GT3 Cup	81	(Germany) Patrick Eisemann	1
(Poland) / Olimp Racing by Lukas Motorsport; (Poland) / Förch Racing powered by Olimp	Porsche 991 GT3 Cup	81	(Germany) Florian Scholze	1
(Poland) / Olimp Racing by Lukas Motorsport; (Poland) / Förch Racing powered by Olimp	Porsche 991 GT3 Cup	81	(Germany) Wolfgang Triller	1
(Poland) / Olimp Racing by Lukas Motorsport; (Poland) / Förch Racing powered by Olimp	Porsche 991 GT3 Cup	81	(Poland) Robert Lukas	3
(Poland) / Olimp Racing by Lukas Motorsport; (Poland) / Förch Racing powered by Olimp	Porsche 991 GT3 Cup	81	(Poland) Piotr Parys	3
(Germany) Black Falcon Team TMD Friction	Porsche 991 GT3 Cup	68	(Saudi Arabia) Saud Al Faisal	1
(Germany) Black Falcon Team TMD Friction	Porsche 991 GT3 Cup	68	(Denmark) Anders Fjordbach	1
(Germany) Black Falcon Team TMD Friction	Porsche 991 GT3 Cup	68	(Saudi Arabia) Saeed Al Mouri	1
(Germany) Black Falcon Team TMD Friction	Porsche 991 GT3 Cup	68	(Spain) Alexander Toril	1
(Germany) Black Falcon Team TMD Friction	Porsche 991 GT3 Cup	69	(Saudi Arabia) Bandar Alesayi	1
(Germany) Black Falcon Team TMD Friction	Porsche 991 GT3 Cup	69	(Germany) Burkard Kaiser	1
(Germany) Black Falcon Team TMD Friction	Porsche 991 GT3 Cup	69	(Germany) Sören Spreng	1
(Germany) Black Falcon Team TMD Friction	Porsche 991 GT3 Cup	69	(Spain) Miguel Toril	1
(Germany) HRT Performance	Porsche 991 GT3 Cup	73	(Germany) Holger Harmsen	1
(Germany) HRT Performance	Porsche 991 GT3 Cup	73	(Germany) Bernd Kleinbach	1
(Germany) HRT Performance	Porsche 991 GT3 Cup	73	(Finland) Emil Lindholm	1
(Germany) HRT Performance	Porsche 991 GT3 Cup	73	(United Kingdom) JM Littman	1
(Germany) HRT Performance	Porsche 991 GT3 Cup	73	(Denmark) René Ogrocki	1
(United Kingdom) APO Sport	Porsche 991 GT3 Cup	80	(United Kingdom) James May	1–2, 7
(United Kingdom) APO Sport	Porsche 991 GT3 Cup	80	(United Kingdom) Paul May	1–2, 7
(United Kingdom) APO Sport	Porsche 991 GT3 Cup	80	(United Kingdom) Alex Osborne	1–2, 7
(Germany) PROsport Performance	Porsche 991 GT3 Cup	85	(United States) Charles Espenlaub	1–5, 7
(Germany) PROsport Performance	Porsche 991 GT3 Cup	85	(United States) Joe Foster	1–5, 7
(Germany) PROsport Performance	Porsche 991 GT3 Cup	85	(United States) Charles Putman	1–5, 7
(Germany) PROsport Performance	Porsche 991 GT3 Cup	85	(United Kingdom) Andy Pilgrim	1, 4
(Germany) MRS GT-Racing	Porsche 991 GT3 Cup	90	(France) Olivier Baharian	1
(Germany) MRS GT-Racing	Porsche 991 GT3 Cup	90	(Germany) Edward Lewis Brauner	1
(Germany) MRS GT-Racing	Porsche 991 GT3 Cup	90	(Norway) Marius Nakken	1
(Germany) MRS GT-Racing	Porsche 991 GT3 Cup	90	(Switzerland) Manuel Nicolaidis	1
(Germany) MSG Motorsport	Porsche 991 GT3 Cup	92	(Austria) Philipp Sager	1–3
(Germany) MSG Motorsport	Porsche 991 GT3 Cup	92	(Austria) Christopher Zöchling	1–3
(Germany) MSG Motorsport	Porsche 991 GT3 Cup	92	(Germany) Alex Autumn	1
(Germany) MSG Motorsport	Porsche 991 GT3 Cup	92	(Germany) Stephan Kuhs	1
(Germany) MSG Motorsport	Porsche 991 GT3 Cup	92	(Switzerland) Nico Rindlisbacher	1
(Germany) MSG Motorsport	Porsche 991 GT3 Cup	92	(Austria) Luca Rettenbacher	2–3
(Germany) MSG Motorsport	Porsche 991 GT3 Cup	92	(Austria) Martin Gasser	5
(Germany) MSG Motorsport	Porsche 991 GT3 Cup	92	(Serbia) Petar Matic	5
(Germany) MSG Motorsport	Porsche 991 GT3 Cup	92	(Bosnia and Herzegovina) Boris Miljevic	5
(Germany) MSG Motorsport	Porsche 991 GT3 Cup	92	(Switzerland) Philipp Schlegel	5
(Germany) MSG Motorsport	Porsche 991 GT3 Cup	93	(Czech Republic) Leonardo Hrobarek	1
(Germany) MSG Motorsport	Porsche 991 GT3 Cup	93	(Germany) Heinz Jürgen Kroner	1
(Germany) MSG Motorsport	Porsche 991 GT3 Cup	93	(France) Gilles Petit	1
(Germany) MSG Motorsport	Porsche 991 GT3 Cup	93	(France) Rémi Terrail	1
(Germany) MSG Motorsport	Porsche 991 GT3 Cup	93	(Slovakia) Robert Zwinger	1
(Germany) MSG Motorsport	Porsche 991 GT3 Cup	93	(Serbia) Petar Matic	2–3
(Germany) MSG Motorsport	Porsche 991 GT3 Cup	93	(Bosnia and Herzegovina) Boris Miljevic	2–3
(Germany) MSG Motorsport	Porsche 991 GT3 Cup	93	(Germany) Alex Herbst	2
(Germany) MSG Motorsport	Porsche 991 GT3 Cup	93	(Austria) Felix Wimmer	2
(Germany) MSG Motorsport	Porsche 991 GT3 Cup	93	(Austria) Martin Gasser	3
(Germany) MSG Motorsport	Porsche 991 GT3 Cup	93	(Slovakia) Richard Gonda	3
(Lebanon) Memac Ogilvy Duel Racing	Porsche 991 GT3 Cup	95	(United Kingdom) Nabil Moutran	1
(Lebanon) Memac Ogilvy Duel Racing	Porsche 991 GT3 Cup	95	(United Kingdom) Ramzi Moutran	1
(Lebanon) Memac Ogilvy Duel Racing	Porsche 991 GT3 Cup	95	(United Kingdom) Sami Moutran	1
(Lebanon) Memac Ogilvy Duel Racing	Porsche 991 GT3 Cup	95	(United Kingdom) Phil Quaife	1
(United Kingdom) track-club Team Chronext	Porsche 991 GT3 Cup	111	(United Kingdom) Adam Balon	7
(United Kingdom) track-club Team Chronext	Porsche 991 GT3 Cup	111	(United Kingdom) Andrew Gordon-Colebrooke	7
(United Kingdom) track-club Team Chronext	Porsche 991 GT3 Cup	111	(United Kingdom) Liam Griffin	7
(United Kingdom) track-club Team Chronext	Porsche 991 GT3 Cup	111	(United Kingdom) Marcus Jewell	7
SP2
(Germany) Mercedes-AMG Testteam Black Falcon	Mercedes-AMG GT4	2	(Saudi Arabia) Saud Al Faisal	6–7
(Germany) Mercedes-AMG Testteam Black Falcon	Mercedes-AMG GT4	2	(Germany) Burkard Kaiser	6
(Germany) Mercedes-AMG Testteam Black Falcon	Mercedes-AMG GT4	2	(Germany) Fidel Leib	6
(Germany) Mercedes-AMG Testteam Black Falcon	Mercedes-AMG GT4	2	(Germany) Manuel Metzger	6
(Germany) Mercedes-AMG Testteam Black Falcon	Mercedes-AMG GT4	2	(Germany) Aurel Schoeller	6
(Germany) Mercedes-AMG Testteam Black Falcon	Mercedes-AMG GT4	2	(Germany) Thomas Jäger	7
(Germany) Mercedes-AMG Testteam Black Falcon	Mercedes-AMG GT4	2	(Turkey) Mustafa-Mehmet Kaya	7
(Germany) Mercedes-AMG Testteam Black Falcon	Mercedes-AMG GT4	2	(Italy) Gabriele Piana	7
(Germany) Mercedes-AMG Testteam Black Falcon	Mercedes-AMG GT4	2	(United Kingdom) Ryan Ratcliffe	7
(France) B2F compétition	Porsche 991 GT3 Cup	35	(France) Benoît Fretin	2–3, 5–6
(France) B2F compétition	Porsche 991 GT3 Cup	35	(France) Bruno Fretin	2–3, 5–6
(France) B2F compétition	Porsche 991 GT3 Cup	35	(France) Michel Mitieus	2–3, 5–6
(France) B2F compétition	Porsche 991 GT3 Cup	35	(France) Jean-Charles Levy	6
(Austria) True-Racing	KTM X-Bow GT4 (SP2)	46	(Austria) Gerald Kiska	3
(Austria) True-Racing	KTM X-Bow GT4 (SP2)	46	(Austria) Ferdinand Stuck	3
(Austria) True-Racing	KTM X-Bow GT4 (SP2)	46	(Austria) Johannes Stuck	3
(Belgium) VDS Racing Adventures	MARC Focus V8	58	(Belgium) Raphaël van der Straten	All
(Belgium) VDS Racing Adventures	MARC Focus V8	58	(Belgium) José Close	1–2, 5–7
(Belgium) VDS Racing Adventures	MARC Focus V8	58	(Belgium) Pierre Dupont	1–2, 6
(Belgium) VDS Racing Adventures	MARC Focus V8	58	(Belgium) Joël Vanloocke	1, 4, 7
(Belgium) VDS Racing Adventures	MARC Focus V8	58	(Belgium) Grégory Paisse	1, 6
(Belgium) VDS Racing Adventures	MARC Focus V8	58	(Belgium) Thierry de Latre du Bosqueau	3, 5, 7
(Belgium) VDS Racing Adventures	MARC Focus V8	58	(Belgium) Stéphane Lémeret	4
(Belgium) VDS Racing Adventures	MARC Focus V8	58	(Australia) Ryan McLeod	4
(Belgium) VDS Racing Adventures	MARC Focus V8	58	(Papua New Guinea) Keith Kassulke	6
(Belgium) VDS Racing Adventures	MARC Focus V8	58	(Belgium) Tom van Rompuy	7
(France) Porsche Lorient Racing	Porsche 991 GT3 Cup	64	(France) Frédéric Lelièvre	2–3, 5
(France) Porsche Lorient Racing	Porsche 991 GT3 Cup	64	(France) Philippe Polette	2–3, 5
(France) Porsche Lorient Racing	Porsche 991 GT3 Cup	64	(France) Christophe Bourret	2
(France) Porsche Lorient Racing	Porsche 991 GT3 Cup	64	(France) Pascal Gibon	2
(France) Porsche Lorient Racing	Porsche 991 GT3 Cup	64	(France) Frédéric Ancel	3, 5
(France) Porsche Lorient Racing	Porsche 991 GT3 Cup	65	(France) Gilles Blasco	2–5
(France) Porsche Lorient Racing	Porsche 991 GT3 Cup	65	(France) Alain Demorge	2–5
(France) Porsche Lorient Racing	Porsche 991 GT3 Cup	65	(France) Jean-François Demorge	2–5
(France) Porsche Lorient Racing	Porsche 991 GT3 Cup	65	(France) Frédéric Ancel	2, 4
(France) Porsche Lorient Racing	Porsche 991 GT3 Cup	65	(France) Pascal Gibon	3
(France) Porsche Lorient Racing	Porsche 991 GT3 Cup	65	(France) Mathieu Pontais	4
(France) IDEC SPORT RACING	Porsche 991 GT3 Cup	75	(France) David Abramczyk	2, 4–7
(France) IDEC SPORT RACING	Porsche 991 GT3 Cup	75	(France) Stéphane Adler	2, 4–7
(France) IDEC SPORT RACING	Porsche 991 GT3 Cup	75	(France) Romain Vozniak	2, 4–7
(France) IDEC SPORT RACING	Porsche 991 GT3 Cup	75	(France) Michael Blanchemain	4, 6–7
(France) IDEC SPORT RACING	Porsche 991 GT3 Cup	75	(France) Franck Leherpeur	4
(France) IDEC SPORT RACING	Porsche 991 GT3 Cup	75	(France) Christophe Cresp	6
(France) IDEC SPORT RACING	Porsche 991 GT3 Cup	75	(France) James Ruffier	7
(Belgium) Speed Lover	Porsche 991 GT3 Cup	78	(Belgium) Pierre-Yves Paque	1–5, 7
(Belgium) Speed Lover	Porsche 991 GT3 Cup	78	(Belgium) Jean-Michel Gerome	1–3, 7
(Belgium) Speed Lover	Porsche 991 GT3 Cup	78	(Netherlands) Richard Verburg	1, 7
(Belgium) Speed Lover	Porsche 991 GT3 Cup	78	(Switzerland) Pieder Decurtins	1
(Belgium) Speed Lover	Porsche 991 GT3 Cup	78	(Belgium) Guy Verheyen	1
(Belgium) Speed Lover	Porsche 991 GT3 Cup	78	(Luxembourg) Christian Kelders	2
(Belgium) Speed Lover	Porsche 991 GT3 Cup	78	(Luxembourg) Carlos Rivas	3
(Belgium) Speed Lover	Porsche 991 GT3 Cup	78	(Spain) Jesús Diez Villaroel	4, 7
(Belgium) Speed Lover	Porsche 991 GT3 Cup	78	(Belgium) Grégory Paisse	4
(Belgium) Speed Lover	Porsche 991 GT3 Cup	78	(United States) Dom Bastien	5
(Belgium) Speed Lover	Porsche 991 GT3 Cup	78	(United Kingdom) Gavin Pickering	5
(Belgium) Speed Lover	Porsche 991 GT3 Cup	78	(France) Gilles Petit	7
(United Kingdom) APO Sport	Porsche 991 GT3 Cup	80	(United Kingdom) Paul May	4–5
(United Kingdom) APO Sport	Porsche 991 GT3 Cup	80	(United Kingdom) Alex Osborne	4–5
(United Kingdom) APO Sport	Porsche 991 GT3 Cup	80	(United Kingdom) James May	4
(Russia) RScar Motorsport	Porsche 991 GT3 Cup	82	(Russia) Andrey Mukovoz	5
(Russia) RScar Motorsport	Porsche 991 GT3 Cup	82	(Russia) Alan Shaydullin	5
(Russia) RScar Motorsport	Porsche 991 GT3 Cup	82	(Russia) Stanislav Sidoruk	5
(Russia) RScar Motorsport	Porsche 991 GT3 Cup	82	(Russia) Artem Soloviev	5
(Germany) Mercedes-AMG Testteam Winward Racing/HTP Motorsport	Mercedes-AMG GT4	84	(Netherlands) Indy Dontje	7
(Germany) Mercedes-AMG Testteam Winward Racing/HTP Motorsport	Mercedes-AMG GT4	84	(Republic of Ireland) Damien Faulkner	7
(Germany) Mercedes-AMG Testteam Winward Racing/HTP Motorsport	Mercedes-AMG GT4	84	(Germany) Maximilian Götz	7
(Germany) Mercedes-AMG Testteam Winward Racing/HTP Motorsport	Mercedes-AMG GT4	84	(United States) Russell Ward	7
(Germany) PROsport Performance	Porsche 991 GT3 Cup	85	(United States) Charles Espenlaub	6
(Germany) PROsport Performance	Porsche 991 GT3 Cup	85	(United States) Joe Foster	6
(Germany) PROsport Performance	Porsche 991 GT3 Cup	85	(United Kingdom) Andy Pilgrim	6
(Germany) PROsport Performance	Porsche 991 GT3 Cup	85	(United States) Charles Putman	6
(Netherlands) JR Motorsport	BMW M3 Endurance (F80)	114	(Belgium) Patrick van Glabeke	7
(Netherlands) JR Motorsport	BMW M3 Endurance (F80)	114	(Netherlands) Bob Herber	7
(Netherlands) JR Motorsport	BMW M3 Endurance (F80)	114	(Netherlands) Martin Lanting	7
(Netherlands) JR Motorsport	BMW M3 Endurance (F80)	114	(Netherlands) Daan Meijer	7
(Netherlands) JR Motorsport	BMW M4 Silhouette	118	(Belgium) Nick Geelen	2
(Netherlands) JR Motorsport	BMW M4 Silhouette	118	(Belgium) Ward Sluys	2
(Netherlands) JR Motorsport	BMW M4 Silhouette	118	(Netherlands) Michael Verhagen	2
(Germany) CCS Racing	KTM X-Bow GT4 (SP2)	201	(Luxembourg) Charel Arendt	2
(Germany) CCS Racing	KTM X-Bow GT4 (SP2)	201	(Estonia) Thomas Padovani	2
(Germany) CCS Racing	KTM X-Bow GT4 (SP2)	201	(Luxembourg) Tommy Rollinger	2
(France) Vortex V8	GC Automobile GC10-V8	203	(Germany) Günther Deutsch	1
(France) Vortex V8	GC Automobile GC10-V8	203	(Germany) Marco Deutsch	1
(France) Vortex V8	GC Automobile GC10-V8	203	(France) Mathieu Pontais	1
(France) Vortex V8	GC Automobile GC10-V8	203	(Switzerland) Kurt Thiel	1
(France) Vortex V8	GC Automobile GC10-V8	203	(Denmark) Martin Hald Gøtsche	2, 4–5
(France) Vortex V8	GC Automobile GC10-V8	203	(Denmark) Nanna Hald Gøtsche	2, 4–5
(France) Vortex V8	GC Automobile GC10-V8	203	(Switzerland) Florian Revaz	2
(France) Vortex V8	GC Automobile GC10-V8	203	(Russia) Maxim Aronov	4
(France) Vortex V8	GC Automobile GC10-V8	203	(Russia) Lev Fridman	4
(France) Vortex V8	GC Automobile GC10-V8	203	(France) Jean Christophe Rey	4
(France) Vortex V8	GC Automobile GC10-V8	203	(France) Lionel Amrouche	5
(Germany) LMS Engineering	Audi TT RS	206	(Germany) Ulrich Andree	2, 5
(Germany) LMS Engineering	Audi TT RS	206	(Germany) Stefan Wieninger	2, 5
(Germany) LMS Engineering	Audi TT RS	206	(United States) Chris Tiger	2
(Germany) LMS Engineering	Audi TT RS	206	(Netherlands) Stéphane Kox	5
(Germany) LMS Engineering	Audi TT RS	206	(Germany) Pierre Kaffer	6
(Germany) LMS Engineering	Audi TT RS	206	(United States) Tracy Krohn	6
(Germany) LMS Engineering	Audi TT RS	206	(Sweden) Niclas Jönsson	6
(Germany) LMS Engineering	Audi TT RS	206	(United States) Jason Wolfe	6
(Hungary) Bovi Motorsport	Brokernet Silver Sting	207	(Hungary) Kálmán Bódis	1
(Hungary) Bovi Motorsport	Brokernet Silver Sting	207	(Denmark) Heino Bo Frederiksen	1
(Hungary) Bovi Motorsport	Brokernet Silver Sting	207	(Germany) Wolfgang Kaufmann	1
(Hungary) Bovi Motorsport	Brokernet Silver Sting	207	(Netherlands) Jaap van Lagen	1
(Germany) Besaplast Racing	Audi TT RS	209	(Germany) Friedhelm Erlebach	1
(Germany) Besaplast Racing	Audi TT RS	209	(Croatia) Franjo Kovac	1
(Germany) Besaplast Racing	Audi TT RS	209	(Czech Republic) Tomás Pekar	1
(Germany) Besaplast Racing	Audi TT RS	209	(Switzerland) Milenko Vukovic	1
MARC Cars Australia	MARC Mazda 3 V8	210	(Australia) Jake Camilleri	7
MARC Cars Australia	MARC Mazda 3 V8	210	(Australia) Morgan Haber	7
MARC Cars Australia	MARC Mazda 3 V8	210	(Papua New Guinea) Keith Kassulke	7
MARC Cars Australia	MARC Mazda 3 V8	210	(Australia) Hadrian Morrall	7
MARC Cars Australia	MARC Mazda 3 V8	214	(Australia) Clint Harvey	7
MARC Cars Australia	MARC Mazda 3 V8	214	(Australia) Brett Niall	7
MARC Cars Australia	MARC Mazda 3 V8	214	(Australia) Malcolm Niall	7
MARC Cars Australia	MARC Mazda 3 V8	214	(Australia) Robert Thomson	7
(Germany) Reiter Engineering	KTM X-Bow GT4 (SP2)	247	(United States) Dore Chaponick, Jr.	1
(Germany) Reiter Engineering	KTM X-Bow GT4 (SP2)	247	(Canada) Anthony Mantella	1
(Germany) Reiter Engineering	KTM X-Bow GT4 (SP2)	247	(Germany) Benjamin Mazatis	1
(Germany) Reiter Engineering	KTM X-Bow GT4 (SP2)	247	(United States) Brett Sandberg	1
SP3-GT4
(United Kingdom) Brookspeed International Motorsport	Porsche Cayman GT4 Clubsport MR	40	(United Kingdom) Rory Butcher	5
(United Kingdom) Brookspeed International Motorsport	Porsche Cayman GT4 Clubsport MR	40	(United States) Chase Owen	5
(United Kingdom) Brookspeed International Motorsport	Porsche Cayman GT4 Clubsport MR	40	(United Kingdom) William Paul	5
(United Kingdom) Brookspeed International Motorsport	Porsche Cayman GT4 Clubsport MR	40	(United Kingdom) Ian James	7
(United Kingdom) Brookspeed International Motorsport	Porsche Cayman GT4 Clubsport MR	40	(Brazil) Pierre Kleinubing	7
(United Kingdom) Brookspeed International Motorsport	Porsche Cayman GT4 Clubsport MR	40	(United States) James McGuire	7
(United Kingdom) Brookspeed International Motorsport	Porsche Cayman GT4 Clubsport MR	40	(United States) John Schauerman	7
(United Kingdom) Brookspeed International Motorsport	Porsche Cayman GT4 Clubsport MR	41	(United Kingdom) Freddie Hunt	7
(United Kingdom) Brookspeed International Motorsport	Porsche Cayman GT4 Clubsport MR	41	(United States) Alan Metni	7
(United Kingdom) Brookspeed International Motorsport	Porsche Cayman GT4 Clubsport MR	41	(United Kingdom) David Pattison	7
(United Kingdom) Brookspeed International Motorsport	Porsche Cayman GT4 Clubsport MR	41	(United States) Joseph Toussaint	7
(Netherlands) Cor Euser Racing	Lotus Evora GT4	70	(Netherlands) Cor Euser	3
(Netherlands) Cor Euser Racing	Lotus Evora GT4	70	(Netherlands) Eric van den Munckhof	3
(Germany) PROsport Performance	Porsche Cayman PRO4 GT4	86	(Germany) Jan Kasperlik	1
(Germany) PROsport Performance	Porsche Cayman PRO4 GT4	86	(Germany) Arno Klasen	1
(Germany) PROsport Performance	Porsche Cayman PRO4 GT4	86	(Belgium) Nico Verdonck	1
(Germany) PROsport Performance	Porsche Cayman PRO4 GT4	86	(Germany) Jörg Viebahn	1
(United Kingdom) track-club	Lotus Evora GT4	111	(United Kingdom) Adam Knight	1, 4
(United Kingdom) track-club	Lotus Evora GT4	111	(United Kingdom) Adam Balon	1
(United Kingdom) track-club	Lotus Evora GT4	111	(United Kingdom) Jamie Stanley	1
(United Kingdom) track-club	Lotus Evora GT4	111	(United Kingdom) Simon Atkinson	4
(United Kingdom) track-club	Lotus Evora GT4	111	(United Kingdom) Marcus Jewell	4
(United Kingdom) track-club	Lotus Evora GT4	111	(United Kingdom) Stuart Ratcliff	4
(Netherlands) JR Motorsport	BMW 320si E90 WTCC	114	(Netherlands) Bob Herber	1–2, 5
(Netherlands) JR Motorsport	BMW 320si E90 WTCC	114	(Netherlands) Gijs Bessem	1
(Netherlands) JR Motorsport	BMW 320si E90 WTCC	114	(Netherlands) Harry Hilders	1
(Netherlands) JR Motorsport	BMW 320si E90 WTCC	114	(Netherlands) Bas Schouten	1
(Netherlands) JR Motorsport	BMW 320si E90 WTCC	114	(Netherlands) Martin Lanting	2, 5
(Netherlands) JR Motorsport	BMW 320si E90 WTCC	118	(Netherlands) Marco Poland	7
(Netherlands) JR Motorsport	BMW 320si E90 WTCC	118	(Belgium) Ward Sluys	7
(Netherlands) JR Motorsport	BMW 320si E90 WTCC	118	(Netherlands) Pieter van Soelen	7
(Netherlands) JR Motorsport	BMW 320si E90 WTCC	118	(Netherlands) Ted van Vliet	7
(United Kingdom) Nissan GT Academy Team RJN	Nissan 370Z GT4	123	(Mexico) Johnny Guindi	1
(United Kingdom) Nissan GT Academy Team RJN	Nissan 370Z GT4	123	(United Kingdom) Jann Mardenborough	1
(United Kingdom) Nissan GT Academy Team RJN	Nissan 370Z GT4	123	(Mexico) Ricardo Sánchez	1
(United Kingdom) Nissan GT Academy Team RJN	Nissan 370Z GT4	123	(France) Romain Sarazin	1
(United Kingdom) CWS	Ginetta G55 GT4	178	(United States) Brandon Gdovic	1
(United Kingdom) CWS	Ginetta G55 GT4	178	(United Kingdom) Tom Hibbert	1
(United Kingdom) CWS	Ginetta G55 GT4	178	(United Kingdom) Mike Simpson	1
(United Kingdom) CWS	Ginetta G55 GT4	178	(United Kingdom) Colin White	1
(Czech Republic) RTR Projects (Note: Entered with car No. 224 instead of No. 221 at the 12H Mugello (Rnd 2).)	KTM X-Bow GT4	221	(Czech Republic) Erik Janiš	2–3
(Czech Republic) RTR Projects	KTM X-Bow GT4	221	(Czech Republic) Sergej Pavlovec	2–3
(Czech Republic) RTR Projects	KTM X-Bow GT4	221	(Czech Republic) Tomas Miniberger	2–3
(Czech Republic) RTR Projects	KTM X-Bow GT4	221	(Czech Republic) Daniel Skalický	2–3
(Czech Republic) RTR Projects	KTM X-Bow GT4	221	(Czech Republic) Milan Kodídek	2
(Netherlands) HTM Racing	Saker GT TDI	222	(Netherlands) Ivo Breukers	3
(Netherlands) HTM Racing	Saker GT TDI	222	(Netherlands) Monny Krant	3
(Netherlands) HTM Racing	Saker GT TDI	222	(Netherlands) Henk Thijssen	3
(United Kingdom) Speedworks Motorsport	Aston Martin Vantage GT4	225	(United Kingdom) Christian Dick	7
(United Kingdom) Speedworks Motorsport	Aston Martin Vantage GT4	225	(United Kingdom) John Gilbert	7
(United Kingdom) Speedworks Motorsport	Aston Martin Vantage GT4	225	(United Kingdom) Tom Ingram	7
(United Kingdom) Speedworks Motorsport	Aston Martin Vantage GT4	225	(United Kingdom) William Phillips	7
(Italy) Nova Race	Ginetta G55 GT4	227	(Italy) Luca Magnoni	2
(Italy) Nova Race	Ginetta G55 GT4	227	(Italy) Luca Rangoni	2
(Italy) Nova Race	Ginetta G55 GT4	227	(France) Philippe Salini	2
(United Kingdom) Century Motorsport	Ginetta G55 GT4	229	(United Kingdom) Nathan Freke	1
(United Kingdom) Century Motorsport	Ginetta G55 GT4	229	(United Kingdom) Ben Green	1
(United Kingdom) Century Motorsport	Ginetta G55 GT4	229	(United Kingdom) Jack Mitchell	1
(United Kingdom) Century Motorsport	Ginetta G55 GT4	229	(United Kingdom) Aiden Moffat	1
(United Kingdom) Optimum Motorsport	Ginetta G55 GT4	231	(Republic of Ireland) Daniel O'Brien	1–6
(United Kingdom) Optimum Motorsport	Ginetta G55 GT4	231	(United Kingdom) Adrian Barwick	1–5
(United Kingdom) Optimum Motorsport	Ginetta G55 GT4	231	(United Kingdom) Stewart Linn	1
(United Kingdom) Optimum Motorsport	Ginetta G55 GT4	231	(United Kingdom) William Moore	1
(United Kingdom) Optimum Motorsport	Ginetta G55 GT4	231	(United Kingdom) Tom Hibbert	2–3
(United Kingdom) Optimum Motorsport	Ginetta G55 GT4	231	(Brazil) Julio Martini	4–5
(United Kingdom) Optimum Motorsport	Ginetta G55 GT4	231	(France) Philippe Salini	4
(United Kingdom) Optimum Motorsport	Ginetta G55 GT4	231	(Norway) Aleksander Schjerpen	6
(United Kingdom) Optimum Motorsport	Ginetta G55 GT4	231	(United Kingdom) Oliver Wilkinson	6
(United Kingdom) Aston Martin Lagonda	Aston Martin Vantage GT8	232	(United Kingdom) Peter Cate	7
(United Kingdom) Aston Martin Lagonda	Aston Martin Vantage GT8	232	(United Kingdom) John Hindhaugh	7
(United Kingdom) Aston Martin Lagonda	Aston Martin Vantage GT8	232	(United Kingdom) Paul Hollywood	7
(United Kingdom) Aston Martin Lagonda	Aston Martin Vantage GT8	232	(United Kingdom) Andy Palmer	7
(Germany) Besaplast Racing	Audi TT RS	233	(Croatia) Franjo Kovac	2–3
(Germany) Besaplast Racing	Audi TT RS	233	(Czech Republic) Tomás Pekar	2–3
(Germany) Besaplast Racing	Audi TT RS	233	(Switzerland) Milenko Vukovic	2–3
(Switzerland) FACH AUTO TECH	Porsche Cayman GT4 Clubsport	240	(Switzerland) Michael Hirschmann	1, 4
(Switzerland) FACH AUTO TECH	Porsche Cayman GT4 Clubsport	240	(Switzerland) Marco Zolin	1, 4
(Switzerland) FACH AUTO TECH	Porsche Cayman GT4 Clubsport	240	(Switzerland) Heinz Arnold	1
(Switzerland) FACH AUTO TECH	Porsche Cayman GT4 Clubsport	240	(Switzerland) Philipp Schnyder	1
(Switzerland) FACH AUTO TECH	Porsche Cayman GT4 Clubsport	240	(Japan) Tomoyuki Takizawa	1
(Switzerland) FACH AUTO TECH	Porsche Cayman GT4 Clubsport	240	(Switzerland) Heinz Bruder	4
(Switzerland) FACH AUTO TECH	Porsche Cayman GT4 Clubsport	240	(Switzerland) Marcel Wagner	4
(Sweden) ALFAB Racing	Porsche Cayman GT4 Clubsport	241	(Sweden) Erik Behrens	1
(Sweden) ALFAB Racing	Porsche Cayman GT4 Clubsport	241	(Sweden) Anders Levin	1
(Sweden) ALFAB Racing	Porsche Cayman GT4 Clubsport	241	(Sweden) Daniel Roos	1
(Sweden) ALFAB Racing	Porsche Cayman GT4 Clubsport	241	(Sweden) Fredrik Ros	1
(Germany) Manthey Racing	Porsche Cayman GT4 Clubsport MR	242	(Germany) Sebastian Kemper	1
(Germany) Manthey Racing	Porsche Cayman GT4 Clubsport MR	242	(Germany) Wolfgang Kemper	1
(Germany) Manthey Racing	Porsche Cayman GT4 Clubsport MR	242	(Germany) Friedhelm Mihm	1
(Germany) Manthey Racing	Porsche Cayman GT4 Clubsport MR	242	(Germany) Marcus von Oeynhausen	1
(Germany) Manthey Racing	Porsche Cayman GT4 Clubsport MR	242	(Germany) Heinz Schmersal	1
(Germany) Black Falcon Team TMD Friction	Porsche Cayman GT4 Clubsport	243	(Turkey) Mustafa-Mehmet Kaya	1
(Germany) Black Falcon Team TMD Friction	Porsche Cayman GT4 Clubsport	243	(Germany) Fidel Leib	1
(Germany) Black Falcon Team TMD Friction	Porsche Cayman GT4 Clubsport	243	(Italy) Gabriele Piana	1
(Germany) Black Falcon Team TMD Friction	Porsche Cayman GT4 Clubsport	243	(Germany) Aurel Schoeller	1
(United Kingdom) Slidesports Pallex	Porsche Cayman GT4 Clubsport	245	(United Kingdom) Nigel Armstrong	1
(United Kingdom) Slidesports Pallex	Porsche Cayman GT4 Clubsport	245	(United Kingdom) Josh Caygill	1
(United Kingdom) Slidesports Pallex	Porsche Cayman GT4 Clubsport	245	(United Kingdom) Jamie Dawson	1
(United Kingdom) Slidesports Pallex	Porsche Cayman GT4 Clubsport	245	(United Kingdom) David Fairbrother	1
(United Kingdom) Slidesports Pallex	Porsche Cayman GT4 Clubsport	245	(United Kingdom) Chris Jones	1
(Germany) Reiter Engineering	KTM X-Bow GT4	246	(Switzerland) Marylin Niederhauser	1
(Germany) Reiter Engineering	KTM X-Bow GT4	246	(Norway) Anna Rathe	1
(Germany) Reiter Engineering	KTM X-Bow GT4	246	(South Africa) Naomi Schiff	1
(Germany) Reiter Engineering	KTM X-Bow GT4	246	(Australia) Caitlin Wood	1
(United Kingdom) Newbridge Motorsport - OCC Lasik Racing	Porsche Cayman GT4 Clubsport	249	(United States) Mathew Keegan	1
(United Kingdom) Newbridge Motorsport - OCC Lasik Racing	Porsche Cayman GT4 Clubsport	249	(United States) Jeffrey Stammer	1
(United Kingdom) Newbridge Motorsport - OCC Lasik Racing	Porsche Cayman GT4 Clubsport	249	(United States) Derek Welch	1
(United States) Rotek Racing	Porsche Cayman GT4 Clubsport	250	(United States) Roy Block	1
(United States) Rotek Racing	Porsche Cayman GT4 Clubsport	250	(United Kingdom) Ian James	1
(United States) Rotek Racing	Porsche Cayman GT4 Clubsport	250	(United States) Jim McGuire	1
(United States) Rotek Racing	Porsche Cayman GT4 Clubsport	250	(France) Nico Rondet	1
(United States) Rotek Racing	Porsche Cayman GT4 Clubsport	250	(United States) John Schauerman	1
(Hong Kong) GDL Racing Team Asia	Porsche Cayman GT4 Clubsport MR	264	(Hong Kong) Antares Au	1
(Hong Kong) GDL Racing Team Asia	Porsche Cayman GT4 Clubsport MR	264	(Hong Kong) Jonathan Hui	1
(Hong Kong) GDL Racing Team Asia	Porsche Cayman GT4 Clubsport MR	264	(Macau) Kevin Tse	1
(Hong Kong) GDL Racing Team Asia	Porsche Cayman GT4 Clubsport MR	264	(Hong Kong) Frank Yu	1
(South Africa) Bucketlist Racing	BMW 340i F30	340	(South Africa) Kris Budnik	1
(South Africa) Bucketlist Racing	BMW 340i F30	340	(South Africa) Uli Sanne	1
(South Africa) Bucketlist Racing	BMW 340i F30	340	(South Africa) Theo van Vuuren	1
(South Africa) Bucketlist Racing	BMW 340i F30	340	(South Africa) Greg Wilson	1
(South Africa) Bucketlist Racing	BMW 340i F30	340	(Zimbabwe) Darren Winterboer	1
(South Africa) Team Africa Le Mans	Ginetta G55 GT4	555	(Netherlands) Jan Lammers	5
(South Africa) Team Africa Le Mans	Ginetta G55 GT4	555	(South Africa) Sarel van der Merwe	5
(South Africa) Team Africa Le Mans	Ginetta G55 GT4	555	(South Africa) Greg Mills	5
(South Africa) Team Africa Le Mans	Ginetta G55 GT4	555	(South Africa) Graham Vos	5
(Germany) Schwede Motorsport	Porsche Cayman GT4 Clubsport MR	777	(Germany) Phillip Bethke	1
(Germany) Schwede Motorsport	Porsche Cayman GT4 Clubsport MR	777	(Germany) Bertram Hornung	1
(Germany) Schwede Motorsport	Porsche Cayman GT4 Clubsport MR	777	(Germany) Norbert Kraft	1
(Germany) Schwede Motorsport	Porsche Cayman GT4 Clubsport MR	777	(Germany) Hans Sadler	1
TCR
(United Arab Emirates) Lap57 Motorsports	Honda Civic TCR	57	(United Arab Emirates) Abdullah Al Hammadi	1
(United Arab Emirates) Lap57 Motorsports	Honda Civic TCR	57	(United Arab Emirates) Saeed Al Mehairi	1
(United Arab Emirates) Lap57 Motorsports	Honda Civic TCR	57	(United Arab Emirates) Mohammed Al Owais	1
(United Arab Emirates) Lap57 Motorsports	Honda Civic TCR	57	(Jordan) Nadir Zuhour	1
(Netherlands) Team Bleekemolen	SEAT León TCR	100	(Netherlands) Michael Bleekemolen	1
(Netherlands) Team Bleekemolen	SEAT León TCR	100	(Netherlands) Sebastiaan Bleekemolen	1
(Netherlands) Team Bleekemolen	SEAT León TCR	100	(Netherlands) Dennis de Borst	1
(Netherlands) Team Bleekemolen	SEAT León TCR	100	(Netherlands) Aart Jan Ringelberg	1
(Switzerland) Capricorn Racing	Honda Civic TCR	101	(Switzerland) Gerhard Haas	2
(Switzerland) Capricorn Racing	Honda Civic TCR	101	(Switzerland) Patrik Meier	2
(Switzerland) Capricorn Racing	Honda Civic TCR	101	(Switzerland) Claudio Truffer	2
(Switzerland) TTC Racing	SEAT León TCR	103	(Austria) Klaus Kresnik	5
(Switzerland) TTC Racing	SEAT León TCR	103	(Switzerland) Daniel Schilliger	5
(Switzerland) TTC Racing	SEAT León TCR	103	(Switzerland) Fredy Suter	5
(United Kingdom) Zest Racecar Engineering	SEAT León TCR	105	(France) Philippe Ulivieri	1, 6
(United Kingdom) Zest Racecar Engineering	SEAT León TCR	105	(United States) John Allen	1
(United Kingdom) Zest Racecar Engineering	SEAT León TCR	105	(United States) Jason Coupal	1
(United Kingdom) Zest Racecar Engineering	SEAT León TCR	105	(Poland) Gosia Rdest	1
(United Kingdom) Zest Racecar Engineering	SEAT León TCR	105	(United States) John Weisberg	1
(United Kingdom) Zest Racecar Engineering	SEAT León TCR	105	(Spain) Jesús Diez Villaroel	6
(United Kingdom) Zest Racecar Engineering	SEAT León TCR	105	(Belgium) Jean-Alexandre Gerome	6
(United Kingdom) Zest Racecar Engineering	SEAT León TCR	105	(Belgium) Jean-Michel Gerome	6
(United Kingdom) Zest Racecar Engineering	SEAT León TCR	105	(United Kingdom) Robert Taylor	6
(United Kingdom) Cadspeed Racing	Audi RS3 LMS TCR	108	(United Kingdom) James Kaye	1, 4–6
(United Kingdom) Cadspeed Racing	Audi RS3 LMS TCR	108	(Republic of Ireland) Erik Holstein	1, 5–6
(United Kingdom) Cadspeed Racing	Audi RS3 LMS TCR	108	(United Kingdom) Julian Griffin	1
(United Kingdom) Cadspeed Racing	Audi RS3 LMS TCR	108	(United Kingdom) Finlay Hutchison	1
(United Kingdom) Cadspeed Racing	Audi RS3 LMS TCR	108	(United Kingdom) Ricky Coomber	4, 6
(United Kingdom) Cadspeed Racing	Audi RS3 LMS TCR	108	(United Kingdom) David Drinkwater	4, 6
(United Kingdom) Cadspeed Racing	Audi RS3 LMS TCR	108	(United Kingdom) Tom Gannon	4
(United Kingdom) Cadspeed Racing	Audi RS3 LMS TCR	108	(United Kingdom) Paul White	4
(United Kingdom) Cadspeed Racing	Audi RS3 LMS TCR	108	(United States) Jason Coupal	5
(United Kingdom) Cadspeed Racing	Audi RS3 LMS TCR	108	(United States) Jim Briody	6
(Spain) Speed Factory Racing	Audi RS3 LMS TCR	109	(Spain) Miguel Abello	3, 5
(Spain) Speed Factory Racing	Audi RS3 LMS TCR	109	(Spain) Jaime Fuster	3, 5
(Spain) Speed Factory Racing	Audi RS3 LMS TCR	109	(Spain) Jesús Fuster	3, 5
(Spain) Speed Factory Racing	Audi RS3 LMS TCR	109	(Netherlands) Mirco van Oostrum	3, 5
(Germany) Bonk Motorsport	Audi RS3 LMS TCR	115	(Germany) Hermann Bock	2
(Germany) Bonk Motorsport	Audi RS3 LMS TCR	115	(Germany) Max Partl	2
(United Kingdom) SICL.com (Note: Car No. 120 entered with a SEAT León TCR at the 12H Mugello (Rnd 2).)	SEAT León Cup Racer	120	(United Kingdom) Frank Pettitt	2, 5
(United Kingdom) SICL.com	SEAT León Cup Racer	120	(United Kingdom) Ashley Woodman	2, 5
(United Kingdom) SICL.com	SEAT León Cup Racer	120	(United Kingdom) Carey Lewis	2
(United Kingdom) SICL.com	SEAT León Cup Racer	120	(United Kingdom) Gavin Spencer	2
(United Kingdom) SICL.com	SEAT León Cup Racer	120	(United Kingdom) Martin Byford	5
Insightracing Denmark	Honda Civic TCR	124	(Sweden) Joakim Frid	4
Insightracing Denmark	Honda Civic TCR	124	(Denmark) Martin Jensen	4
Insightracing Denmark	Honda Civic TCR	124	(Norway) Marcus Påverud	4
Insightracing Denmark	Honda Civic TCR	124	(Denmark) Frederik Schandorff	4
(Netherlands) NKPP Racing by Bas Koeten Racing (Note: Car No. 125 entered with a SEAT León Cup Racer at the 12H Mugello (Rnd 2).)	SEAT León TCR	125	(Netherlands) Gijs Bessem	2, 7
(Netherlands) NKPP Racing by Bas Koeten Racing	SEAT León TCR	125	(Netherlands) Harry Hilders	2, 7
(Netherlands) NKPP Racing by Bas Koeten Racing	SEAT León TCR	125	(Netherlands) Bas Koeten	2
(Netherlands) NKPP Racing by Bas Koeten Racing	SEAT León TCR	125	(Netherlands) Willem Meijer	7
(Netherlands) NKPP Racing by Bas Koeten Racing	SEAT León TCR	125	(Netherlands) Rob Rappange	7
(Hong Kong) Modena Motorsports	SEAT León TCR	216	(Canada) John Shen	1, 4
(Hong Kong) Modena Motorsports	SEAT León TCR	216	(Canada) Wayne Shen	1, 4
(Hong Kong) Modena Motorsports	SEAT León TCR	216	(Netherlands) Francis Tjia	1, 4
(Hong Kong) Modena Motorsports	SEAT León TCR	216	(Switzerland) Mathias Beche	1
(Hong Kong) Modena Motorsports	SEAT León TCR	216	(Denmark) Benny Simonsen	4
(Netherlands) Red Camel-Jordans.nl (Note: Car No. 303 entered with a SEAT León Cup Racer at the 24H Dubai (Rnd 1).)	SEAT León TCR	303	(Iran) Aram Martroussian	1, 7
(Netherlands) Red Camel-Jordans.nl	SEAT León TCR	303	(United Kingdom) Kane Astin	1
(Netherlands) Red Camel-Jordans.nl	SEAT León TCR	303	(Netherlands) Christian Dijkhof	1
(Netherlands) Red Camel-Jordans.nl	SEAT León TCR	303	(United Kingdom) Daniel Wheeler	1
(Netherlands) Red Camel-Jordans.nl	SEAT León TCR	303	(Netherlands) Ivo Breukers	7
(Netherlands) Red Camel-Jordans.nl	SEAT León TCR	303	(Netherlands) Rik Breukers	7
(France) Team Altran Peugeot	Peugeot 308 Racing Cup	308	(France) Thierry Blaise	3–7
(France) Team Altran Peugeot	Peugeot 308 Racing Cup	308	(Denmark) Kim Holmgaard	3–6
(France) Team Altran Peugeot	Peugeot 308 Racing Cup	308	(France) Guillaume Roman	3–5, 7
(France) Team Altran Peugeot	Peugeot 308 Racing Cup	308	(France) Michel Derue	4
(France) Team Altran Peugeot	Peugeot 308 Racing Cup	308	(Denmark) Michael Carlsen	6
(France) Team Altran Peugeot	Peugeot 308 Racing Cup	308	(France) Mathieu Sentis	6
(France) Team Altran Peugeot	Peugeot 308 Racing Cup	308	(Spain) Gonzalo Martin de Andres	7
(France) Team Altran Peugeot	Peugeot 308 Racing Cup	308	(France) Marc Guillot	7
(France) Team Altran Peugeot	Peugeot 308 Racing Cup	908	(France) Thierry Boyer	3–7
(France) Team Altran Peugeot	Peugeot 308 Racing Cup	908	(France) Stéphane Ventaja	3–4, 6–7
(France) Team Altran Peugeot	Peugeot 308 Racing Cup	908	(Denmark) Michael Carlsen	3
(France) Team Altran Peugeot	Peugeot 308 Racing Cup	908	(France) Thierry Chkondali	4, 6
(France) Team Altran Peugeot	Peugeot 308 Racing Cup	908	(France) Sebastien Dussolliet	4
(France) Team Altran Peugeot	Peugeot 308 Racing Cup	908	(France) Michel Derue	5, 7
(France) Team Altran Peugeot	Peugeot 308 Racing Cup	908	(France) Jean-Charles Covarel	5
(France) Team Altran Peugeot	Peugeot 308 Racing Cup	908	(Spain) Gonzalo Martin de Andres	6
(France) Team Altran Peugeot	Peugeot 308 Racing Cup	908	(France) François Riaux	7
(Switzerland) Stanco&Tanner Motorsport	SEAT León Cup Racer	312	(Switzerland) Armando Stanco	2
(Switzerland) Stanco&Tanner Motorsport	SEAT León Cup Racer	312	(Switzerland) Stefan Tanner	2
(Germany) Car Collection Motorsport	Audi RS3 LMS TCR	333	(Germany) Dirk Vorländer	2, 4
(Germany) Car Collection Motorsport	Audi RS3 LMS TCR	333	(Germany) Monika Parhofer	2, 4
(Germany) Car Collection Motorsport	Audi RS3 LMS TCR	333	(Austria) Siegfried Kuzdas	2
(Germany) Car Collection Motorsport	Audi RS3 LMS TCR	333	(Germany) Christian Schmitz	2
(Germany) Car Collection Motorsport	Audi RS3 LMS TCR	333	(Netherlands) Rik Breukers	4
(Germany) Car Collection Motorsport	Audi RS3 LMS TCR	333	(Germany) Christian Kranenberg	4
(Germany) Car Collection Motorsport	Audi RS3 LMS TCR	333	(United Kingdom) JM Littman	4
(France) B2F compétition	Peugeot 308 Racing Cup	335	(France) Thomas Fretin	2, 5–6
(France) B2F compétition	Peugeot 308 Racing Cup	335	(France) Laetitia Tortelier	2, 5–6
(France) B2F compétition	Peugeot 308 Racing Cup	335	(France) Régis Paillard	2, 6
(France) B2F compétition	Peugeot 308 Racing Cup	335	(France) Pascal Colon	5–6
A3
(Netherlands) Cor Euser Racing	BMW M3 (E46)	71	(Netherlands) Cor Euser	1, 7
(Netherlands) Cor Euser Racing	BMW M3 (E46)	71	(United Kingdom) Sam Allpass	1
(Netherlands) Cor Euser Racing	BMW M3 (E46)	71	(Germany) Klaus-Dieter Frommer	1
(Netherlands) Cor Euser Racing	BMW M3 (E46)	71	(Denmark) Michael Nielsen	1
(Netherlands) Cor Euser Racing	BMW M3 (E46)	71	(Netherlands) Richard Verburg	1
(Netherlands) Cor Euser Racing	BMW M3 (E46)	71	(United States) Jim Briody	7
(Netherlands) Cor Euser Racing	BMW M3 (E46)	71	(United States) Chapman Ducote	7
(Netherlands) Cor Euser Racing	BMW M3 (E46)	71	(United States) David Ducote	7
(Netherlands) Cor Euser Racing	BMW M3 (E46)	71	(United States) Wayne Ducote	7
(United Kingdom) RKC/TGM	Honda Civic Type R (FD2)	99	(United Kingdom) Ricky Coomber	1
(United Kingdom) RKC/TGM	Honda Civic Type R (FD2)	99	(United Kingdom) Simon Deaton	1
(United Kingdom) RKC/TGM	Honda Civic Type R (FD2)	99	(United Kingdom) David Drinkwater	1
(United Kingdom) RKC/TGM	Honda Civic Type R (FD2)	99	(United Kingdom) Tom Gannon	1
(United Kingdom) RKC/TGM	Honda Civic Type R (FD2)	99	(United Kingdom) Paul White	1
(United Kingdom) track-club	SEAT León Supercopa	121	(United Kingdom) Simon Atkinson	1
(United Kingdom) track-club	SEAT León Supercopa	121	(United Kingdom) Bob Drummond	1
(United Kingdom) track-club	SEAT León Supercopa	121	(United Kingdom) Marcus Jewell	1
(United Kingdom) track-club	SEAT León Supercopa	121	(United Kingdom) Stuart Ratcliff	1
(Germany) Hofor-Kuepper Racing	BMW M3 Coupé (E46)	131	(Austria) Gustav Engljähringer	1
(Germany) Hofor-Kuepper Racing	BMW M3 Coupé (E46)	131	(Austria) Michael Fischer	1
(Germany) Hofor-Kuepper Racing	BMW M3 Coupé (E46)	131	(Switzerland) Martin Kroll	1
(Germany) Hofor-Kuepper Racing	BMW M3 Coupé (E46)	131	(Germany) Bernd Küpper	1
(Germany) Hofor-Kuepper Racing	BMW M3 Coupé (E46)	131	(Czech Republic) Sergej Pavlovec	1
(Italy) PB Racing	Lotus Elise Cup PB-R	133	(Italy) Stefano D'Aste	1
(Italy) PB Racing	Lotus Elise Cup PB-R	133	(Italy) Michele Bartyan	1
(Italy) PB Racing	Lotus Elise Cup PB-R	133	(Italy) Stefano Pasotti	1
(Italy) PB Racing	Lotus Elise Cup PB-R	133	(Italy) Lorenzo Pegoraro	1
(Italy) PB Racing	Lotus Elise Cup PB-R	133	(Germany) Immanuel Vinke	1
(United Kingdom) Zest Racecar Engineering	SEAT León Supercopa	135	(United Kingdom) Graham Cox	1
(United Kingdom) Zest Racecar Engineering	SEAT León Supercopa	135	(United Kingdom) Ryan Savage	1
(United Kingdom) Zest Racecar Engineering	SEAT León Supercopa	135	(United Kingdom) Robert Taylor	1
(United Kingdom) Zest Racecar Engineering	SEAT León Supercopa	135	(Australia) Christopher Wishart	1
(Germany) Pfister-Racing Team	SEAT León Supercopa	150	(Germany) Gerald Heigis	3
(Germany) Pfister-Racing Team	SEAT León Supercopa	150	(Austria) Mario Krall	3
(Germany) Pfister-Racing Team	SEAT León Supercopa	150	(Austria) Wolfgang Kriegl	3
(Germany) Pfister-Racing Team	SEAT León Supercopa	150	(Austria) Christof Pichler	3
(Portugal) Parkalgar Racing Team	Honda Civic Type R (FK2)	188	(United Kingdom) Matt Brookes	6
(Portugal) Parkalgar Racing Team	Honda Civic Type R (FK2)	188	(United Kingdom) Peter Brookes	6
(Portugal) Parkalgar Racing Team	Honda Civic Type R (FK2)	188	(United Kingdom) Roger Green	6
(Portugal) Parkalgar Racing Team	Honda Civic Type R (FK2)	188	(United Kingdom) Chris Hoy	6
(Portugal) Parkalgar Racing Team	Honda Civic Type R (FK2)	188	(Brazil) Joaquim Penteado	6
(France) Team Altran Peugeot	Peugeot 208 GTI	308	(France) Thierry Blaise	1
(France) Team Altran Peugeot	Peugeot 208 GTI	308	(Denmark) Michael Carlsen	1
(France) Team Altran Peugeot	Peugeot 208 GTI	308	(Denmark) Kim Holmgaard	1
(France) Team Altran Peugeot	Peugeot 208 GTI	308	(France) Guillaume Roman	1
(France) Team Altran Peugeot	Peugeot 208 GTI	908	(Spain) Gonzalo de Andrés	1
(France) Team Altran Peugeot	Peugeot 208 GTI	908	(Lebanon) Yusif Bassil	1
(France) Team Altran Peugeot	Peugeot 208 GTI	908	(France) Thierry Boyer	1
(France) Team Altran Peugeot	Peugeot 208 GTI	908	(France) Loïc Dupont	1
CUP1
(Germany) Bonk Motorsport	BMW M235i Racing Cup	145	(Germany) Michael Bonk	1–2
(Germany) Bonk Motorsport	BMW M235i Racing Cup	145	(Germany) Axel Burghardt	1–2
(Germany) Bonk Motorsport	BMW M235i Racing Cup	145	(Germany) Thomas Leyherr	1
(Germany) Bonk Motorsport	BMW M235i Racing Cup	145	(Germany) Volker Piepmeyer	1
(Germany) Bonk Motorsport	BMW M235i Racing Cup	145	(Germany) Jürgen Meyer	2
(Germany) Bonk Motorsport	BMW M235i Racing Cup	145	(Germany) Matthias Schrey	2
(Germany) Bonk Motorsport	BMW M235i Racing Cup	146	(Germany) Hermann Bock	1
(Germany) Bonk Motorsport	BMW M235i Racing Cup	146	(Germany) Max Partl	1
(Germany) Bonk Motorsport	BMW M235i Racing Cup	146	(Germany) Rainer Partl	1
(Germany) Sorg Rennsport	BMW M235i Racing Cup	151	(Germany) Heiko Eichenberg	1
(Germany) Sorg Rennsport	BMW M235i Racing Cup	151	(Germany) Stephan Epp	1
(Germany) Sorg Rennsport	BMW M235i Racing Cup	151	(Germany) Christian Andreas Franz	1
(Germany) Sorg Rennsport	BMW M235i Racing Cup	151	(Austria) Michael Holleweger	1
(Germany) Sorg Rennsport	BMW M235i Racing Cup	151	(Norway) Oskar Sandberg	1
(Germany) Sorg Rennsport	BMW M235i Racing Cup	151	(United States) Ray Mason	7
(Germany) Sorg Rennsport	BMW M235i Racing Cup	151	(United States) Quinten Nelson	7
(Germany) Sorg Rennsport	BMW M235i Racing Cup	151	(Mexico) Benito Tagle	7
(Germany) Sorg Rennsport	BMW M235i Racing Cup	151	(United States) Simon Tibbett	7
(Germany) Sorg Rennsport	BMW M235i Racing Cup	151	(United States) Alexander W. Wetzlich	7
(Germany) Sorg Rennsport	BMW M235i Racing Cup	152	(Spain) Jesús Diez Villaroel	1
(Germany) Sorg Rennsport	BMW M235i Racing Cup	152	(United Arab Emirates) Ahmed Al Melaihi	1
(Germany) Sorg Rennsport	BMW M235i Racing Cup	152	(Spain) José Manuel de los Milagros	1
(Germany) Sorg Rennsport	BMW M235i Racing Cup	152	(Singapore) Shawn Peh	1
(Germany) Sorg Rennsport	BMW M235i Racing Cup	152	(United Kingdom) George Richardson	1
(Belgium) QSR Racingschool	BMW M235i Racing Cup	154	(Belgium) Jimmy de Breucker	1, 7
(Belgium) QSR Racingschool	BMW M235i Racing Cup	154	(Belgium) Rodrigue Gillion	1
(Belgium) QSR Racingschool	BMW M235i Racing Cup	154	(Belgium) Kevin Kenis	1
(Belgium) QSR Racingschool	BMW M235i Racing Cup	154	(Belgium) Mario Timmers	1
(Belgium) QSR Racingschool	BMW M235i Racing Cup	154	(Belgium) Tom Boonen	7
(Belgium) QSR Racingschool	BMW M235i Racing Cup	154	(Belgium) Jan Heylen	7
(Belgium) QSR Racingschool	BMW M235i Racing Cup	154	(Belgium) Luc Moortgat	7
(Belgium) QSR Racingschool	BMW M235i Racing Cup	154	(Belgium) Patrick Zeeuws	7
(Belgium) QSR Racingschool	BMW M235i Racing Cup	161	(Belgium) Rodrigue Gillion	7
(Belgium) QSR Racingschool	BMW M235i Racing Cup	161	(Sweden) Tommy Graberg	7
(Belgium) QSR Racingschool	BMW M235i Racing Cup	161	(Sweden) Emilie Liljeström	7
(Belgium) QSR Racingschool	BMW M235i Racing Cup	161	(United States) John Mauro	7
(Belgium) QSR Racingschool	BMW M235i Racing Cup	161	(United States) McKay Snow	7
(United States) Classic BMW	BMW M235i Racing Cup	158	(United States) John Capesstro-DuBets	7
(United States) Classic BMW	BMW M235i Racing Cup	158	(United States) Max Fedler	7
(United States) Classic BMW	BMW M235i Racing Cup	158	(United States) Jason Hart	7
(United States) Classic BMW	BMW M235i Racing Cup	158	(United States) Matt Travis	7
(United States) Classic BMW	BMW M235i Racing Cup	158	(United States) Mike Vess	7
(Luxembourg) DUWO Racing	BMW M235i Racing Cup	235	(Luxembourg) Jean-Marie Dumont	1, 4
(Luxembourg) DUWO Racing	BMW M235i Racing Cup	235	(France) Nicolas Schmit	1, 4
(Luxembourg) DUWO Racing	BMW M235i Racing Cup	235	(France) Thierry Chkondali	1
(Luxembourg) DUWO Racing	BMW M235i Racing Cup	235	(France) Bruno Derossi	1
(Luxembourg) DUWO Racing	BMW M235i Racing Cup	235	(France) Frédéric Schmit	1
(Luxembourg) DUWO Racing	BMW M235i Racing Cup	235	(United Kingdom) Adrian Watt	4
(Luxembourg) DUWO Racing	BMW M235i Racing Cup	235	(United States) Alexander W. Wetzlich	4
(Luxembourg) DUWO Racing	BMW M235i Racing Cup	235	(United Kingdom) Chris Wilson	4
A2
(United Arab Emirates) ZRT Motorsport	Honda Integra (fourth generation)	48	(United Kingdom) Graham Davidson	1
(United Arab Emirates) ZRT Motorsport	Honda Integra (fourth generation)	48	(Pakistan) Umair Ahmed Khan	1
(United Arab Emirates) ZRT Motorsport	Honda Integra (fourth generation)	48	(Republic of Ireland) Jonathan Mullan	1
(United Arab Emirates) ZRT Motorsport	Honda Integra (fourth generation)	48	(United Kingdom) Chris Yarwood	1
(Denmark) Team Sally Racing	Renault Clio Cup (III)	52	(Denmark) Mads Christensen	1
(Denmark) Team Sally Racing	Renault Clio Cup (III)	52	(Denmark) Steffan Jusjong	1
(Denmark) Team Sally Racing	Renault Clio Cup (III)	52	(Denmark) Sune Marcussen	1
(Denmark) Team Sally Racing	Renault Clio Cup (III)	52	(Denmark) Peter Obel	1
(Denmark) Team Sally Racing	Renault Clio Cup (III)	52	(Denmark) Martin Sally Pedersen	1
(Denmark) Team Sally Racing	Renault Clio Cup (III)	53	(Denmark) Kenneth Løndal Pedersen	1
(Denmark) Team Sally Racing	Renault Clio Cup (III)	53	(Denmark) Dennis Nymand	1
(Denmark) Team Sally Racing	Renault Clio Cup (III)	53	(Denmark) Michael Skipper	1
(Denmark) Team Sally Racing	Renault Clio Cup (III)	53	(Denmark) Michael Vesthave	1
(Switzerland) Stanco&Tanner Motorsport (Note: Car No. 112 entered with a Renault Clio Cup (IV) at the 24H Dubai (Rnd 1).)	Renault Clio Cup (III)	112	(Switzerland) Stefan Tanner	1–2
(Switzerland) Stanco&Tanner Motorsport	Renault Clio Cup (III)	112	(Switzerland) Ralf Henggeler	1
(Switzerland) Stanco&Tanner Motorsport	Renault Clio Cup (III)	112	(United Kingdom) Andy Mollison	1
(Switzerland) Stanco&Tanner Motorsport	Renault Clio Cup (III)	112	(Sweden) Nicklas Oscarsson	1
(Switzerland) Stanco&Tanner Motorsport	Renault Clio Cup (III)	112	(Italy) Luigi Stanco	1
(Switzerland) Stanco&Tanner Motorsport	Renault Clio Cup (III)	112	(Switzerland) Endy Stanco	2
(Switzerland) Stanco&Tanner Motorsport	Renault Clio Cup (III)	112	(Switzerland) Armando Stanco	2
(France) TEAM CLIO CUP FRANCE	Renault Clio Cup (IV)	165	(France) Pascal Arellano	1
(France) TEAM CLIO CUP FRANCE	Renault Clio Cup (IV)	165	(France) Jimmy Clairet	1
(France) TEAM CLIO CUP FRANCE	Renault Clio Cup (IV)	165	(France) Teddy Clairet	1
(France) TEAM CLIO CUP FRANCE	Renault Clio Cup (IV)	165	(France) Jeremy Sarhy	1
(France) TEAM CLIO CUP FRANCE	Renault Clio Cup (IV)	165	(France) Eric Tremoulet	1
(Denmark) Team Eva Solo / Jönsson Consulting (Note: Car No. 171 entered as Team Eva Solo/K-Rejser at the 24H Dubai (Rnd 1) and at the 12H Mugello (Rnd 2).)	Peugeot RCZ	171	(Denmark) Jan Engelbrecht	1–2, 7
(Denmark) Team Eva Solo / Jönsson Consulting	Peugeot RCZ	171	(Denmark) Henrik Sørensen	1–2, 7
(Denmark) Team Eva Solo / Jönsson Consulting	Peugeot RCZ	171	(Denmark) Jacob Kristensen	1–2
(Denmark) Team Eva Solo / Jönsson Consulting	Peugeot RCZ	171	(Denmark) Thomas Sørensen	1, 7
(Denmark) Team Eva Solo / Jönsson Consulting	Peugeot RCZ	171	(Denmark) Jens Mølgaard	1
(Denmark) Team Eva Solo / Jönsson Consulting	Peugeot RCZ	171	(Denmark) Claus Bertelsen	7
(Denmark) Team Eva Solo / Jönsson Consulting	Peugeot RCZ	171	(Denmark) Søren Jönsson	7
(United Kingdom) Team Cooksport	Renault Clio Cup (IV)	172	(United Kingdom) Josh Cook	1, 5
(United Kingdom) Team Cooksport	Renault Clio Cup (IV)	172	(United Kingdom) Oliver Cook	1, 5
(United Kingdom) Team Cooksport	Renault Clio Cup (IV)	172	(United Kingdom) Alex Sedgwick	1, 5
(United Kingdom) Team Cooksport	Renault Clio Cup (IV)	172	(United Kingdom) Shayne Deegan	1
(United Kingdom) Team Cooksport	Renault Clio Cup (IV)	172	(United Kingdom) Jon Maybin	1
(United Kingdom) Team Cooksport	Renault Clio Cup (IV)	172	(United Kingdom) Adam Hatfield	5
Endurance Team Romania	Toyota GT86 CS-V3	173	(Italy) Fabrizio Broggi	2, 5
Endurance Team Romania	Toyota GT86 CS-V3	173	(Romania) Sergiu Nicolae	2, 5
Endurance Team Romania	Toyota GT86 CS-V3	173	(Romania) Mihai Costin	2
Endurance Team Romania	Toyota GT86 CS-V3	173	(Romania) Stefan Unchiasu	2
Endurance Team Romania	Toyota GT86 CS-V3	173	(Romania) Viorel Nicolae	5
(United States) THRW Honda Racing	Honda Civic Si	183	(United States) Douglas Chan	7
(United States) THRW Honda Racing	Honda Civic Si	183	(United States) Ryan Eversley	7
(United States) THRW Honda Racing	Honda Civic Si	183	(United States) Jeremy Lucas	7
(United States) THRW Honda Racing	Honda Civic Si	183	(Canada) Scott Nicol	7
(United States) THRW Honda Racing	Honda Civic Si	184	(United States) Derek Ferretti	7
(United States) THRW Honda Racing	Honda Civic Si	184	(Canada) Lawrence Hwang	7
(United States) THRW Honda Racing	Honda Civic Si	184	(United States) Calvin Tam	7
(United States) THRW Honda Racing	Honda Civic Si	184	(United States) Michael Tsay	7
(United Arab Emirates) Lap57 Motorsports	Honda Integra (fourth generation)	570	(Japan) Teruhiko Hamano	1
(United Arab Emirates) Lap57 Motorsports	Honda Integra (fourth generation)	570	(Germany) Peter Jürgen	1
(United Arab Emirates) Lap57 Motorsports	Honda Integra (fourth generation)	570	(Japan) Kouichi Okumura	1
(United Arab Emirates) Lap57 Motorsports	Honda Integra (fourth generation)	570	(Sri Lanka) Ashan Silva	1
(United Arab Emirates) Lap57 Motorsports	Honda Integra (fourth generation)	570	(Japan) Junichi Umemoto	1

== Results and standings ==
=== Race results ===
Bold indicates overall winner.

Classes	(United Arab Emirates) Dubai (Round 1)	(Italy) Mugello (Round 2)	(Austria) Red Bull Ring (Round 3)	(France) Paul Ricard (Round 4)	(Italy) Imola (Round 5)	(Portugal) Portimao (Round 6)	(Belgium) Spa (Round NC1)	(Belgium) Spa (Round NC2)	(United States) Austin (Round 7)
A6-Pro Winners	(Germany) **No. 911 Herberth Motorsport**	(Czech Republic) **No. 11 Scuderia Praha**	(Germany) **No. 911 Herberth**; **Motorsport**	(Germany) **No. 911 Herberth**; **Motorsport**	(Czech Republic) No. 11 Scuderia Praha	(Czech Republic) **No. 11 Scuderia Praha**	No entries		(Germany) **No. 911 Herberth Motorsport**
A6-Pro Winners	(Switzerland) **Daniel Allemann** **(Germany) Ralf Bohn** **(New Zealand) Brendon Hartley** **(Germany) Alfred Renauer** **(Germany) Robert Renauer**	(Czech Republic) **Josef Král** **(Italy) Matteo Malucelli** **(Czech Republic) Jiří Písařík**	(Switzerland) **Daniel Allemann** **(Germany) Alfred Renauer** **(Germany) Robert Renauer**	(Switzerland) **Daniel Allemann** **(Germany) Ralf Bohn** **(Germany) Alfred Renauer** **(Germany) Robert Renauer**	(Czech Republic) Josef Král (Czech Republic) Jiří Písařík	(Czech Republic) **Josef Král** **(Italy) Matteo Malucelli** **(Czech Republic) Jiří Písařík**	No entries		(Switzerland) **Daniel Allemann** **(Germany) Ralf Bohn** **(Germany) Alfred Renauer** **(Germany) Robert Renauer**
A6-Am Winners	(Switzerland) No. 1 Hofor-Racing	(Switzerland) No. 1 Hofor-Racing	(Austria) No. 963 GRT Grasser; Racing Team	(Switzerland) No. 1 Hofor-Racing	(Germany) **No. 32 Car Collection Motorsport**	(Switzerland) No. 1 Hofor-Racing	No entries		(Germany) No. 34 Car Collection Motorsport
A6-Am Winners	(Switzerland) Roland Eggimann (Netherlands) Christiaan Frankenhout (Germany) Kenneth Heyer (Switzerland) Chantal Kroll (Switzerland) Michael Kroll	(Switzerland) Roland Eggimann (Netherlands) Christiaan Frankenhout (Germany) Kenneth Heyer (Switzerland) Chantal Kroll (Switzerland) Michael Kroll	(Switzerland) Mark Ineichen (Switzerland) Christoph Lenz (Italy) Roberto Pampanini (Serbia) Miloš Pavlović	(Switzerland) Roland Eggimann (Netherlands) Christiaan Frankenhout (Germany) Kenneth Heyer (Switzerland) Chantal Kroll (Switzerland) Michael Kroll	(Germany) **Max Edelhoff** **(Austria) Horst Felbermayr Jr.** **(Spain) Toni Forné** **(Germany) Dimitri Parhofer**	(Switzerland) Roland Eggimann (Netherlands) Christiaan Frankenhout (Germany) Kenneth Heyer (Switzerland) Chantal Kroll (Switzerland) Michael Kroll	No entries		(Germany) Gustav Edelhoff (Germany) Max Edelhoff (Germany) Elmar Grimm (Germany) Johannes Kirchhoff (Germany) Ingo Vogler
SPX Winners	(United Arab Emirates) No. 87 GDL Racing Middle East	Merged with A6-Pro and A6-Am classes					(Belgium) No. 78 Speed Lover	(Belgium) No. 78 Speed Lover	Merged with A6-Pro and A6-Am classes
SPX Winners	(Germany) Pierre Ehret (France) Franck Pelle (Finland) Rory Penttinen (United States) Vic Rice	Merged with A6-Pro and A6-Am classes					(Belgium) Pierre-Yves Paque (Luxembourg) Carlos Rivas (Luxembourg) Bob Wilwert	(Belgium) Pierre-Yves Paque (Luxembourg) Carlos Rivas (Luxembourg) Bob Wilwert	Merged with A6-Pro and A6-Am classes
991 Winners	(Germany) No. 68 Black Falcon Team; TMD Friction	(Germany) No. 85 PROsport Performance	(Germany) No. 85 PROsport; Performance	(Germany) No. 85 PROsport; Performance	(Germany) No. 85 PROsport; Performance	No entries	No entries		(Germany) No. 85 PROsport; Performance
991 Winners	(Saudi Arabia) Saud Al Faisal (Denmark) Anders Fjordbach (Saudi Arabia) Saeed Al Mouri (Spain) Alexander Toril	(United States) Charles Espenlaub (United States) Joe Foster (United States) Charles Putman	(United States) Charles Espenlaub (United States) Joe Foster (United States) Charles Putman	(United States) Charles Espenlaub (United States) Joe Foster (United Kingdom) Andy Pilgrim (United States) Charles Putman	(United States) Charles Espenlaub (United States) Joe Foster (United States) Charles Putman	No entries	No entries		(United States) Charles Espenlaub (United States) Joe Foster (United States) Charles Putman
SP2 Winners	(Hungary) No. 207 Bovi Motorsport	(Belgium) No. 78 Speed Lover	(France) No. 35 B2F compétition	(France) No. 65 Porsche Lorient Racing	(France) No. 64 Porsche Lorient Racing	(Germany) No. 85 PROsport; Performance	No entries		No. 214 MARC Cars Australia
SP2 Winners	(Hungary) Kálmán Bódis (Denmark) Heino Bo Frederiksen (Germany) Wolfgang Kaufmann (Netherlands) Jaap van Lagen	(Belgium) Jean-Michel Gerome (Luxembourg) Christian Kelders (Belgium) Pierre-Yves Paque	(France) Benoît Fretin (France) Bruno Fretin (France) Michel Mitieus	(France) Frédéric Ancel (France) Gilles Blasco (France) Alain Demorge (France) Jean-François Demorge (France) Mathieu Pontais	(France) Frédéric Ancel (France) Frédéric Lelièvre (France) Philippe Polette	(United States) Charles Espenlaub (United States) Joe Foster (United Kingdom) Andy Pilgrim (United States) Charles Putman	No entries		(Australia) Clint Harvey (Australia) Brett Niall (Australia) Malcolm Niall (Australia) Robert Thomson
SP3-GT4 Winners	(United Kingdom) No. 231 Optimum Motorsport	(Italy) No. 227 Nova Race	(Germany) No. 233 Besaplast Racing	(United Kingdom) No. 111 track-club	(Netherlands) No. 114 JR Motorsport	(Portugal) No. 188 Parkalgar Racing Team	did not participate		(United Kingdom) No. 41 Brookspeed International Motorsport
SP3-GT4 Winners	(United Kingdom) Adrian Barwick (United Kingdom) Stewart Linn (United Kingdom) William Moore (Republic of Ireland) Daniel O'Brien	(Italy) Luca Magnoni (Italy) Luca Rangoni (France) Philippe Salini	(Croatia) Franjo Kovac (Czech Republic) Tomás Pekar (Switzerland) Milenko Vukovic	(United Kingdom) Simon Atkinson (United Kingdom) Marcus Jewell (United Kingdom) Adam Knight (United Kingdom) Stuart Ratcliff	(Netherlands) Bob Herber (Netherlands) Martin Lanting	(United Kingdom) Matt Brookes (United Kingdom) Peter Brookes (United Kingdom) Roger Green (United Kingdom) Chris Hoy (Brazil) Joaquim Penteado	did not participate		(United Kingdom) Freddie Hunt (United States) Alan Metni (United Kingdom) David Pattison (United States) Joseph Toussaint
TCR Winners	(United Kingdom) No. 108 CadSpeed Racing with A Tech	(Germany) No. 115; Bonk Motorsport	(France) No. 308 Team Altran Peugeot	(Hong Kong) No. 216 Modena Motorsports	(Switzerland) No. 103 TTC Racing	(France) No. 308 Team Altran Peugeot	did not participate		(France) No. 308 Team Altran Peugeot
TCR Winners	(United Kingdom) Julian Griffin (Republic of Ireland) Erik Holstein (United Kingdom) Finlay Hutchison (United Kingdom) James Kaye	(Germany) Hermann Bock (Germany) Max Partl	(France) Thierry Blaise (Denmark) Kim Holmgaard (France) Guillaume Roman	(Canada) John Shen (Canada) Wayne Shen (Denmark) Benny Simonsen (Netherlands) Francis Tjia	(Austria) Klaus Kresnik (Switzerland) Daniel Schilliger (Switzerland) Fredy Suter	(France) Thierry Blaise (Denmark) Michael Carlsen (Denmark) Kim Holmgaard (France) Mathieu Sentis	did not participate		(Spain) Gonzalo Martin de Andres (France) Thierry Blaise (France) Marc Guillot (France) Guillaume Roman
A3 Winners	(France) No. 308 Team Altran Peugeot	No entries	(Germany) No. 150 Pfister-Racing Team	No entries		Merged with SP3-GT4 class	did not participate		Merged with SP3-GT4 class
A3 Winners	(France) Thierry Blaise (Denmark) Michael Carlsen (Denmark) Kim Holmgaard (France) Guillaume Roman	No entries	(Germany) Gerald Heigis (Austria) Mario Krall (Austria) Wolfgang Kriegl (Austria) Christof Pichler	No entries		Merged with SP3-GT4 class	did not participate		Merged with SP3-GT4 class
CUP1 Winners	(Germany) No. 151 Sorg Rennsport	(Germany) No. 145; Bonk Motorsport	No entries	(Luxembourg) No. 235 DUWO Racing	No entries		did not participate		(United States) No. 158 Classic BMW
CUP1 Winners	(Germany) Heiko Eichenberg (Germany) Stephan Epp (Germany) Christian Andreas Franz (Austria) Michael Holleweger (Norway) Oskar Sandberg	(Germany) Michael Bonk (Germany) Axel Burghardt (Germany) Jürgen Meyer (Germany) Matthias Schrey	No entries	(Luxembourg) Jean-Marie Dumont (France) Nicolas Schmit (United Kingdom) Adrian Watt (United States) Alexander W. Wetzlich (United Kingdom) Chris Wilson	No entries		did not participate		(United States) John Capestro-DuBets (United States) Max Fedler (United States) Jason Hart (United States) Matt Travis (United States) Mike Vess
A2 Winners	(Denmark) No. 171 Team Eva Solo/K-Rejser	(Denmark) No. 171 Team Eva; Solo/K-Rejser	No entries		(United Kingdom) No. 172 Team Cooksport	No entries	did not participate		(Denmark) No. 171 Team Eva Solo / Jönsson Consulting
A2 Winners	(Denmark) Jan Engelbrecht (Denmark) Jacob Kristensen (Denmark) Jens Mølgaard (Denmark) Henrik Sørensen (Denmark) Thomas Sørensen	(Denmark) Jan Engelbrecht (Denmark) Jacob Kristensen (Denmark) Henrik Sørensen	No entries		(United Kingdom) Josh Cook (United Kingdom) Oliver Cook (United Kingdom) Adam Hatfield (United Kingdom) Alex Sedgwick	No entries	did not participate		(Denmark) Claus Bertelsen (Denmark) Jan Engelbrecht (Denmark) Søren Jönsson (Denmark) Henrik Sørensen (Denmark) Thomas Sørensen

== See also ==
- 24H Series
- 2017 Touring Car Endurance Series
- 2017 24H Proto Series
- 2017 Dubai 24 Hour
