= 2017 Dubai 24 Hour =

The layout of the Dubai Autodrome.

The 2017 Dubai 24 Hour was the 12th running of the Dubai 24 Hour endurance race. It took place at the Dubai Autodrome in Dubai, United Arab Emirates, and ran between 11 and 13 January 2017. During the race there were a total of 22 Code 60's, which equated to over 5 hours of the race ran under Code 60 conditions.

== Race result ==
Class Winners in bold.

There were only 4 different leaders in the race.

| Pos | Class | No | Team | Drivers | Car | Laps |
|---|---|---|---|---|---|---|
| 1 | **A6-Pro** | **911** | **(Germany) Herberth Motorsport** | **(Switzerland) Daniel Allemann (Germany) Ralf Bohn (Germany) Robert Renauer (Germany) Alfred Renauer (New Zealand) Brendon Hartley** | **Porsche 991 GT3 R** | **578** |
| 2 | A6-Pro | 12 | (Germany) Manthey Racing | (Germany) Otto Klohs (Germany) Sven Müller (Italy) Matteo Cairoli (Germany) Jochen Krumbach | Porsche 991 GT3 R | 576 |
| 3 | A6-Pro | 3 | (Germany) Black Falcon | (Saudi Arabia) Abdulaziz Al Faisal (Germany) Hubert Haupt (Netherlands) Yelmer Buurman (Poland) Michał Broniszewski (Germany) Maro Engel | Mercedes-AMG GT3 | 575 |
| 4 | A6-Pro | 14 | (United Kingdom) Optimum Motorsport | (United Kingdom) Joe Osborne (United Kingdom) Flick Haigh (United Kingdom) Ryan Ratcliffe (Germany) Christopher Haase | Audi R8 LMS | 571 |
| 5 | A6-Pro | 76 | (France) IMSA Performance | (France) Raymond Narac (France) Thierry Cornac (France) Maxime Jousse (France) Mathieu Jaminet | Porsche 991 GT3 R | 569 |
| 6 | A6-Pro | 5 | (Belgium) Belgian Audi Club Team WRT | (Saudi Arabia) Mohammed Bin Saud Al Saud (Saudi Arabia) Mohammed Bin Faisal Al Saud (Switzerland) Marcel Fässler (Netherlands) Michael Vergers | Audi R8 LMS | 564 |
| 7 | **A6-Am** | **1** | **(Switzerland) Hofor-Racing** | **(Switzerland) Michael Kroll (Switzerland) Chantal Kroll (Switzerland) Roland Eggimann (Germany) Kenneth Heyer (Netherlands) Christiaan Frankenhout** | **Mercedes-AMG GT3** | **563** |
| 8 | A6-Pro | 16 | (Germany) SPS automotive performance | (Germany) Valentin Pierburg (Germany) Tim Müller (Germany) Lance David Arnold (United Kingdom) Tom Onslow-Cole | Mercedes-AMG GT3 | 561 |
| 9 | A6-Am | 27 | (United Arab Emirates) GP Extreme | (Ivory Coast) Frédéric Fatien (Switzerland) Tiziano Carugati (Netherlands) Nicky Pastorelli (United Kingdom) Stuart Hall | Renault R.S. 01 FGT3 | 558 |
| 10 | A6-Am | 34 | (Germany) Car Collection Motorsport | (Germany) Johannes Kirckhoff (Germany) Gustav Edelhoff (Germany) Max Edelhoff (Germany) Elmar Grimm (Germany) Ingo Vogler | Audi R8 LMS | 557 |
| 11 | **991** | **68** | **(Germany) Black Falcon Team TMD Friction** | **(Saudi Arabia) Saud Al Faisal (Saudi Arabia) Saeed Al Mouri (Denmark) Anders Fjordbach (Spain) Alexander Toril** | **Porsche 991 GT3 Cup** | **555** |
| 12 | A6-Am | 18 | (Netherlands) V8 Racing | (Netherlands) Wolf Nathan (Netherlands) Rick Abresch (Netherlands) Luc Braams (Netherlands) Duncan Huisman (Netherlands) Alex van 't Hoff | Chevrolet Corvette C6.R ZR1 | 552 |
| 13 | A6-Pro | 4 | (Germany) Belgian Audi Club Team WRT | (Belgium) Enzo Ide (United Kingdom) Stuart Leonard (Netherlands) Robin Frijns (Germany) Christopher Mies (Belgium) Ruben Maes | Audi R8 LMS | 552 |
| 14 | A6-Am | 66 | (Germany) Attempto Racing | (Germany) Jürgen Häring (Germany) Mike Hansch (Germany) Dietmar Ulrich (Germany) Peter Terting (Germany) Philipp Wlazik | Porsche 991 GT3 R | 552 |
| 15 | 991 | 85 | (Germany) PROsport Performance | (United States) Charles Putman (United States) Charles Espenlaub (United States) Joe Foster (United Kingdom) Andy Pilgrim | Porsche 991 GT3 Cup | 551 |
| 16 | 991 | 63 | (Germany) race:pro motorsport | (Russia) Stanislav Minsky (Russia) Murad Sultanov (Austria) Klaus Bachler (Luxembourg) Carlos Rivas (Germany) Mark Wallenwein | Porsche 991 GT3 Cup | 550 |
| 17 | A6-Am | 22 | (Belgium) Gravity Racing International | (Belgium) Vincent Radermecker (Spain) Gérard Lopez (Luxembourg) Christian Kelders (Czech Republic) Jarek Janiš | Mercedes SLS AMG GT3 | 549 |
| 18 | **SPX** | **87** | **(United Arab Emirates) GDL Racing Middle East** | **(France) Franck Pelle (Finland) Rory Penttinen (United States) Vic Rice (Germany) Pierre Ehret** | **Lamborghini Huracán Super Trofeo** | **547** |
| 19 | SPX | 10 | (Germany) Leipert Motorsport | (United Kingdom) Oliver Webb (United Kingdom) Jake Rattenbury (Canada) Jean-Charles Perrin (Germany) Harald Schlotter | Lamborghini Huracán Super Trofeo | 547 |
| 20 | SPX | 51 | (Switzerland) FACH AUTO TECH | (Switzerland) Thomas Fleischer (Switzerland) Peter Joos (Switzerland) Marcel Wagner (Switzerland) Heinz Bruder (Austria) Martin Ragginger | Porsche 991 Cup MR | 542 |
| 21 | A6-Pro | 21 | (Austria) Konrad Motorsport | (Germany) Marc Basseng (Italy) Marco Mapelli (France) Jules Gounon (Germany) Luca Stolz (Germany) Paul Scheuschner | Lamborghini Huracán GT3 | 539 |
| 22 | 991 | 92 | (Austria) MSG Motorsport | (Austria) Philipp Sager (Germany) Alex Autumn (Austria) Christopher Zöchling (Switzerland) Nico Rindlisbacher (Germany) Stephan Kuhs | Porsche 991 GT3 Cup | 539 |
| 23 | 991 | 69 | (Germany) Black Falcon Team TMD Friction | (Germany) Burkard Kaiser (Germany) Sören Spreng (Spain) Miguel Toril (Saudi Arabia) Bondar Alesayi | Porsche 991 GT3 Cup | 538 |
| 24 | SPX | 77 | (Singapore) GDL Racing Team Asia | (Singapore) Liam Lim Keong (Hong Kong) Nigel Farmer (Singapore) Bruce Lee (Singapore) Gerald Tan | Lamborghini Huracán Super Trofeo | 535 |
| 25 | SPX | 401 | (Germany) Schubert Motorsport | (United Kingdom) Ricky Collard (Germany) Jens Klingmann (Germany) Jörg Müller | BMW M4 GT4 | 532 |
| 26 | **SP3-GT4** | **231** | **(United Kingdom) Optimum Motorsport** | **(United Kingdom) Stewart Linn (United Kingdom) Adrian Barwick (Republic of Ireland) Daniel O'Brien (United Kingdom) William Moore** | **Ginetta G55 GT4** | **531** |
| 27 | **SP2** | **207** | **(Hungary) Bovi Motorsport** | **(Germany) Wolfgang Kaufmann (Hungary) Kálmán Bódis (Netherlands) Jaap van Lagen (Denmark) Heino Bo Frederiksen** | **Brokernet Silver Sting** | **526** |
| 28 | SP3-GT4 | 229 | (United Kingdom) Century Motorsport | (United Kingdom) Nathan Freke (United Kingdom) Aiden Moffat (United Kingdom) Jack Mitchell (United Kingdom) Ben Green | Ginetta G55 GT4 | 524 |
| 29 | SP3-GT4 | 267 | (Hong Kong) GDL Racing Team Asia | (Hong Kong) Jonathan Hui (Hong Kong) Frank Yu (Hong Kong) Antares Au (Macau) Kevin Tse | Porsche Cayman GT4 Clubsport | 524 |
| 30 | SP3-GT4 | 178 | (United Kingdom) CWS | (United Kingdom) Colin White (United Kingdom) Tom Hibbert (United Kingdom) Mike Simpson (United States) Brandon Gdovic | Ginetta G55 GT4 | 524 |
| 31 | SP2 | 247 | (Germany) Reiter Engineering | (Canada) Anthony Mantella (United States) Dore Chaponick Jr. (United States) Brett Sandberg (Germany) Benjamin Mazatis | KTM X-Bow GT4 (SP2) | 524 |
| 32 | SP3-GT4 | 241 | (Sweden) ALFAB Racing | (Sweden) Erik Behrens (Sweden) Daniel Roos (Sweden) Anders Levin (Sweden) Frederik Ros | Porsche Cayman GT4 Clubsport | 521 |
| 33 | SP3-GT4 | 86 | (Germany) PROsport Performance | (Germany) Jörg Viebahn (Germany) Jan Kasperlik (Germany) Arno Klasen (Belgium) Nico Verdonck | Porsche Cayman GT4 Clubsport | 519 |
| 34 | SP2 | 58 | (Belgium) VDS Racing Adventures | (Belgium) Raphaël van der Straten (Belgium) Joël Vanloocke (Belgium) Grégory Paisse (Belgium) Pierre Dupont (Belgium) José Close | MARC Focus V8 | 518 |
| 35 | SP3-GT4 | 114 | (Netherlands) JR Motorsport | (Netherlands) Bob Herber (Netherlands) Harry Hilders (Netherlands) Gijs Bessem (Netherlands) Bas Schouten | BMW 320si E90 WTCC | 517 |
| 36 | **TCR** | **108** | **(United Kingdom) CadSpeed Racing with A Tech** | **(United Kingdom) James Kaye (United Kingdom) Julian Griffin (Republic of Ireland) Erik Holstein (United Kingdom) Finlay Hutchison** | **Audi RS3 LMS TCR** | **513** |
| 37 | SP2 | 78 | (Belgium) Speed Lover | (Belgium) Guy Verheyen (Belgium) Pierre-Yves Paque (Belgium) Jean-Michel Gerome (Switzerland) Pieder Decurtins (Netherlands) Richard Verburg | Porsche 991 GT3 Cup | 512 |
| 38 | TCR | 216 | (Hong Kong) Modena Motorsports | (Canada) Wayne Shen (Canada) John Shen (Netherlands) Francis Tjia (Switzerland) Mathias Beche | SEAT León TCR | 511 |
| 39 | SP3-GT4 | 123 | (United Kingdom) Nissan GT Academy Team RJN | (United Kingdom) Jann Mardenborough (Mexico) Ricardo Sánchez (France) Romain Sarazin (Mexico) Johnny Guindi | Nissan 370Z GT4 | 511 |
| 40 | SP3-GT4 | 111 | (United Kingdom) track-club | (United Kingdom) Adam Balon (United Kingdom) Adam Knight (United Kingdom) Jamie Stanley | Lotus Evora GT4 | 507 |
| 41 | SP2 | 209 | (Germany) Besaplast Racing | (Croatia) Franjo Kovac (Czech Republic) Tomás Pekar (Germany) Friedhelm Erlebach (Switzerland) Milenko Vukovic | Audi TT RS | 504 |
| 42 | SP3-GT4 | 250 | (United States) Rotek Racing | (United States) Jim McGuire (United States) Roy Block (United States) John Schauerman (France) Nico Rondet (United Kingdom) Ian James | Porsche Cayman GT4 Clubsport | 503 |
| 43 | SP3-GT4 | 249 | (United Kingdom) Newbridge Motorsport - OCC Lasik Racing | (United States) Mathew Keegan (United States) Jeffrey Stammer (United States) Derek Welch | Porsche Cayman GT4 Clubsport | 502 |
| 44 | **A3** | **308** | **(France) Team Altran Peugeot** | **(France) Guillaume Roman (France) Thierry Blaise (Denmark) Kim Holmgaard (Denmark) Michael Carlsen** | **Peugeot 208 GTI** | **500** |
| 45 | **CUP1** | **151** | **(Germany) Sorg Rennsport** | **(Germany) Stephan Epp (Germany) Christian Andreas Franz (Austria) Michael Holleweger (Germany) Heiko Eichenberg (Norway) Oskar Sandberg** | **BMW M235i Racing Cup** | **497** |
| 46 | A3 | 908 | (France) Team Altran Peugeot | (Lebanon) Yusif Bassil (France) Thierry Boyer (Spain) Gonzalo de Andrés (France) Loïc Dupont | Peugeot 208 GTI | 496 |
| 47 | A3 | 133 | (Italy) PB Racing | (Italy) Stefano D'Aste (Italy) Stefano Pasotti (Italy) Lorenzo Pegoraro (Germany) Immanuel Vinke (Italy) Michele Bartyan | Lotus Elise Cup PB-R | 495 |
| 48 | **A2** | **171** | **(Denmark) Team Eva Solo/K-Rejser** | **(Denmark) Jacob Kristensen (Denmark) Jan Engelbrecht (Denmark) Thomas Sørensen (Denmark) Jens Mølgaard (Denmark) Henrik Sørensen** | **Peugeot RCZ** | **492** |
| 49 | CUP1 | 152 | (Germany) Sorg Rennsport | (United Arab Emirates) Ahmed Al Melaihi (Spain) Jesús Diéz (Spain) José Manuel de los Milagros (United Kingdom) George Richardson (Singapore) Shawn Peh | BMW M235i Racing Cup | 491 |
| 50 | SP3-GT4 | 242 | (Germany) Manthey Racing | (Germany) Heinz Schmersal (Germany) Friedhelm Mihm (Germany) Markus von Oeynhausen (Germany) Wolfgang Kemper (Germany) Sebastian Kemper | Porsche Cayman GT4 Clubsport | 488 |
| 51 | SP3-GT4 | 777 | (Germany) Schwede Motorsport | (Germany) Phillip Bethke (Germany) Bertram Hornung (Germany) Norbert Kraft (Germany) Hans Sadler | Porsche Cayman GT4 Clubsport | 486 |
| 52 | TCR | 105 | (United Kingdom) Zest Racecar Engineering | (France) Philippe Ulivieri (Poland) Gosia Rdest (United States) John Allen (United States) J.T. Coupal (United States) John Weisberg | SEAT León TCR | 483 |
| 53 | CUP1 | 146 | (Germany) Bonk Motorsport | (Germany) Hermann Bock (Germany) Rainer Partl (Germany) Max Partl | BMW M235i Racing Cup | 482 |
| 54 | CUP1 | 145 | (Germany) Bonk Motorsport | (Germany) Volker Piepmeyer (Germany) Axel Burghardt (Germany) Michael Bonk (Germany) Thomas Leyherr | BMW M235i Racing Cup | 480 |
| 55 | A2 | 172 | (United Kingdom) Team Cooksport | (United Kingdom) Alex Sedgwick (United Kingdom) Shayne Deegan (United Kingdom) Oliver Cook (United Kingdom) Jon Maybin (United Kingdom) Josh Cook | Renault Clio Cup (IV) | 475 |
| 56 | CUP1 | 235 | (Luxembourg) DUWO Racing | (Luxembourg) Jean-Marie Dumont (France) Frédéric Schmit (France) Nicolas Schmit (France) Thierry Chkondali (France) Bruno Derossi | BMW M235i Racing Cup | 474 |
| 57 | A2 | 52 | (Denmark) Team Sally Racing | (Denmark) Martin Sally Pedersen (Denmark) Peter Obel (Denmark) Steffan Jusjong (Denmark) Sune Marcussen (Denmark) Mads Christensen | Renault Clio Cup (III) | 470 |
| 58 | A2 | 112 | (Switzerland) Stanco&Tanner Motorsport | (Switzerland) Stefan Tanner (Italy) Luigi Stanco (Switzerland) Ralf Henggeler (United Kingdom) Andy Mollison (Sweden) Nicklas Oscarsson | Renault Clio Cup (IV) | 465 |
| 59 | A3 | 121 | (United Kingdom) track-club | (United Kingdom) Marcus Jewell (United Kingdom) Bob Drummond (United Kingdom) Simon Atkinson (United Kingdom) Stuart Ratcliff | SEAT León Supercopa | 463 |
| 60 | A6-Am | 25 | (Germany) HTP Motorsport | (Netherlands) Wim de Pundert (Germany) Bernd Schneider (Germany) Carsten Tilke (Luxembourg) Brice Bosi | Mercedes-AMG GT3 | 459 |
| 61 | SP3-GT4 | 340 | (South Africa) Bucketlist Racing | (Zimbabwe) Darren Winterboer (South Africa) Uli Sanne (South Africa) Theo van Vuuren (South Africa) Greg Wilson (South Africa) Kris Budnik | BMW 340i F30 | 456 |
| 62 | A3 | 99 | (United Kingdom) RKC/TGM | (United Kingdom) Ricky Coomber (United Kingdom) Tom Gannon (United Kingdom) David Drinkwater (United Kingdom) Simon Deaton (United Kingdom) Paul White | Honda Civic Type R (FD2) | 453 |
| 63 | A3 | 135 | (United Kingdom) Zest Racecar Engineering | (United Kingdom) Robert Taylor (United Kingdom) Graham Cox (Australia) Christopher Wishart (United Kingdom) Ryan Savage | SEAT León Supercopa | 444 |
| 64 | CUP1 | 154 | (Belgium) QSR | (Belgium) Jimmy De Breucker (Belgium) Rodrigue Gillion (Belgium) Kevin Kenis (Belgium) Mario Timmers | BMW M235i Racing Cup | 440 |
| 65 | A2 | 48 | (United Arab Emirates) ZRT Motorsport | (United Kingdom) Graham Davidson (Pakistan) Umair Ahmed Khan (Republic of Ireland) Jonathan Mullan (United Kingdom) Chris Yarwood | Honda Integra (fourth generation) | 437 |
| 66 | TCR | 303 | (Netherlands) Red Camel-Jordans.nl | (United Kingdom) Daniel Wheeler (United Kingdom) Kane Astin (Iran) Aram Martroussian (Netherlands) Christian Dijkhof | SEAT León TCR | 435 |
| 67 | 991 | 80 | (United Kingdom) APO Sport | (United Kingdom) Alex Osborne (United Kingdom) James May (United Kingdom) Paul May | Porsche 991 GT3 Cup | 433 |
| 68 | SP3-GT4 | 245 | (United Kingdom) Slidesports Pallex | (United Kingdom) David Fairbrother (United Kingdom) Jamie Dawson (United Kingdom) Nigel Armstrong (United Kingdom) Chris Jones (United Kingdom) Josh Caygill | Porsche Cayman GT4 Clubsport | 429 |
| 69 | A2 | 570 | (United Arab Emirates) Lap57 Motorsports | (Japan) Junichi Umemoto (Japan) Kouichi Okumura (Japan) Teruhiko Hamano (Germany) Peter Jürgen (Sri Lanka) Ashan Silva | Honda Integra (fourth generation) | 428 |
| 70 | A6-Pro | 2 | (Germany) Black Falcon | (United Arab Emirates) Khaled Al Qubaisi (Netherlands) Jeroen Bleekemolen (Germany) Patrick Assenheimer (Germany) Manuel Metzger | Mercedes-AMG GT3 | 397 |
| 71 | A6-Pro | 963 | (Austria) GRT Grasser Racing Team | (Italy) Mirko Bortolotti (Germany) Christian Engelhart (Netherlands) Rik Breukers (Switzerland) Rolf Ineichen (Switzerland) Mark Ineichen | Lamborghini Huracán GT3 | 388 |
| 72 | SP3-GT4 | 246 | (Germany) Reiter Engineering | (Australia) Caitlin Wood (Norway) Anna Rathe (South Africa) Naomi Schiff (Switzerland) Marylin Niederhauser | KTM X-Bow GT4 | 336 |
| 73 | A2 | 53 | (Denmark) Team Sally Racing | (Denmark) Kenneth Løndal Pedersen (Denmark) Michael Vesthave (Denmark) Dennis Nymand (Denmark) Michael Skipper | Renault Clio Cup (III) | 300 |
Not Classified in A6-Pro
| NC | A6-Pro | 29 | (Poland) Förch Racing powered by Olimp | (Poland) Robert Lukas (Poland) Marcin Jedliński (Germany) Wolf Henzler (Mexico) Santiago Creel (Poland) Robert Kubica | Porsche 991 GT3 R | 242 |
| NC | A6-Pro | 17 | (France) IDEC SPORT RACING | (France) Patrice Lafargue (France) Paul Lafargue (France) Nicolas Minassian (France) Alban Varutti | Mercedes-AMG GT3 | 216 |
| NC | A6-Pro | 28 | (United Arab Emirates) GP Extreme | (South Africa) Jordan Grogor (Switzerland) Louis Delétraz (France) Jean-Éric Vergne (United Kingdom) Josh Webster (Canada) Bassam Kronfli | Renault R.S. 01 FGT3 | 148 |
| NC | A6-Pro | 964 | (Austria) GRT Grasser Racing Team | (Italy) Mirko Bortolotti (Germany) Christian Engelhart (Argentina) Ezequiel Pérez Companc (Switzerland) Rolf Ineichen (Switzerland) Adrian Amstutz | Lamborghini Huracán GT3 | 74 |
| NC | A6-Pro | 7 | (Austria) HB Racing | (Austria) Herbert Handlos (Austria) Norbert Siedler (United Kingdom) Sam Tordoff (Germany) Florian Spengler (Italy) Andrea Amici | Lamborghini Huracán GT3 | 46 |
Not Classified in A6-Am
| NC | A6-Am | 33 | (Germany) Car Collection Motorsport | (Germany) Peter Schmidt (Germany) Dimitri Parhofer (Spain) Daniel Diaz Varela (Spain) Isaac Tutumlu (Spain) Toni Forné | Audi R8 LMS | 249 |
Not Classified in SPX
| NC | SPX | 204 | (France) Vortex V8 | (France) Lionel Amrouche (France) Cyril Calmon (France) Olivier Gomez (France) Arnaud Gomez | Vortex 1.0 | 313 |
| NC | SPX | 24 | (France) COOL RACING BY GPC MOTORSPORT | (Switzerland) Alexandre Coigny (Switzerland) Gino Forgione (Switzerland) Iradj Alexander (United States) Tom Dyer | Vortex 1.0 | 302 |
| NC | SPX | 19 | (Netherlands) Eurotrac (by Bas Koeten) | (Netherlands) Bert de Heus (Netherlands) Daniël de Jong (Netherlands) Ivo Breukers (Netherlands) Leon Rijnbeek | Dodge Viper CC Series 2 | 6 |
Not Classified in 991
| NC | 991 | 95 | (Lebanon) Memac Ogilvy Duel Racing | (United Kingdom) Ramzi Moutran (United Kingdom) Nabil Moutran (United Kingdom) Sami Moutran (United Kingdom) Phil Quaife | Porsche 991 GT3 Cup | 293 |
| NC | 991 | 90 | (Germany) MRS GT-Racing | (France) Olivier Baharian (Switzerland) Manuel Nicolaidis (Germany) Edward Lewis Brauner (Norway) Marius Nakken | Porsche 991 GT3 Cup | 284 |
| NC | 991 | 93 | (Austria) MSG Motorsport | (Slovenia) Robert Zwinger (Czech Republic) Leonardo Hrobarek (France) Gilles Petit (France) Rémi Terrail (Germany) Heinz Jürgen Kroner | Porsche 991 GT3 Cup | 238 |
| NC | 991 | 73 | (Germany) HRT Performance | (Finland) Emil Lindholm (Denmark) René Ogrocki (Germany) Holger Harmsen (Germany) Bernd Kleinbach (United Kingdom) JM Littman | Porsche 991 GT3 Cup | 154 |
| NC | 991 | 81 | (Poland) Olimp Racing by Lukas Motorsport | (Poland) Igor Waliłko (Germany) Patrick Eisemann (Germany) Wolfgang Triller (Germany) Florian Scholze (Germany) Chris Bauer | Porsche 991 GT3 Cup | 78 |
Not Classified in SP2
| NC | SP2 | 203 | (France) Vortex V8 | (Germany) Günther Deutsch (Germany) Marco Deutsch (France) Mathieu Pontais (Switzerland) Kurt Thiel | GC Automobile GC10-V8 | 276 |
Not Classified in SP3-GT4
| NC | SP3-GT4 | 243 | (Germany) Black Falcon Team TMD Friction | (Germany) Aurel Schoeller (Germany) Fidel Leib (Italy) Gabriele Piana (Turkey) Mustafa Mehmet Kaya | Porsche Cayman GT4 Clubsport | 245 |
| DNS | SP3-GT4 | 240 | (Switzerland) FACH AUTO TECH | (Switzerland) Marco Zolin (Switzerland) Philipp Schnyder (Switzerland) Michael Hirschmann (Switzerland) Heinz Arnold (Japan) Tomoyuki Takizawa | Porsche Cayman GT4 Clubsport | 0 |
Not Classified in TCR
| NC | TCR | 100 | (Netherlands) Team Bleekemolen | (Netherlands) Sebastiaan Bleekemolen (Netherlands) Michael Bleekemolen (Netherlands) Dennis de Borst (Netherlands) Aart Jan Ringelberg | SEAT León TCR | 213 |
| DNS | TCR | 57 | (United Arab Emirates) Lap57 Motorsports | (United Arab Emirates) Mohammed Al Owais (United Arab Emirates) Abdullah Al Hammadi (United Arab Emirates) Nadir Zuhour (United Arab Emirates) Saeed Al Mehairi | Honda Civic TCR | 0 |
Not Classified in A3
| NC | A3 | 131 | (Germany) Hofor-Kuepper Racing | (Germany) Bernd Küpper (Switzerland) Martin Kroll (Austria) Michael Fischer (Czech Republic) Sergej Pavlovec (Austria) Gustav Engljähringer | BMW M3 Coupé (E46) | 74 |
| NC | A3 | 71 | (Netherlands) Cor Euser Racing | (United Kingdom) Sam Allpass (Netherlands) Richard Verburg (Netherlands) Cor Euser (Germany) Klaus-Dieter Frommer (Denmark) Michael Nielsen | BMW M3 (E46) | 63 |
Not Classified in A2
| DNS | A2 | 165 | (France) TEAM CLIO CUP FRANCE | (France) Eric Tremoulet (France) Jimmy Clairet (France) Teddy Clairet (France) Jeremy Sarhy (France) Pascal Arellano | Renault Clio Cup (IV) | 0 |

== Fastest Laps ==
A6-Pro: Y. Buurman (Black Falcon, Mercedes AMG GT3): 1:59.198

A6-Am: B. Schneider (HTP Motorsport, Mercedes AMG GT3): 2:00.464

SPX: T. Dyer (COOL RACING BY GPC MOTORSPORT, Vortex 1.0): 2:03.117

991: K. Bachier (race:pro motorsport, Porsche 991 Cup): 2:05.060

SP2: J. van Lagen (Bovi Motorsport, Brokernet Silver Sting): 2:06.067

SP3-GT4: J. Mardenborough (Nissan GT Academy Team RJN, Nissan 370Z GT4): 2:10.180

TCR: M. Beche (Modena Motorsports, Seat Leon TCR V2 SEQ): 2:12.889

A3: S. D'Aste (PB Racing, Lotus Elise Cup PB-R): 2:16.947

CUP1: J. de los Milagros (Sorg Rennsport, BMW M235i Racing Cup): 2:19.228

A2: A. Mollison (Stanco & Tanner Motorsport, Renault Clio Cup IV): 2:21.765
