= George Eastman Museum =

Museum in Rochester, New York

Coordinates: 43.1521°N 77.5803°W

- U.S. National Register of Historic Places
- U.S. National Historic Landmark
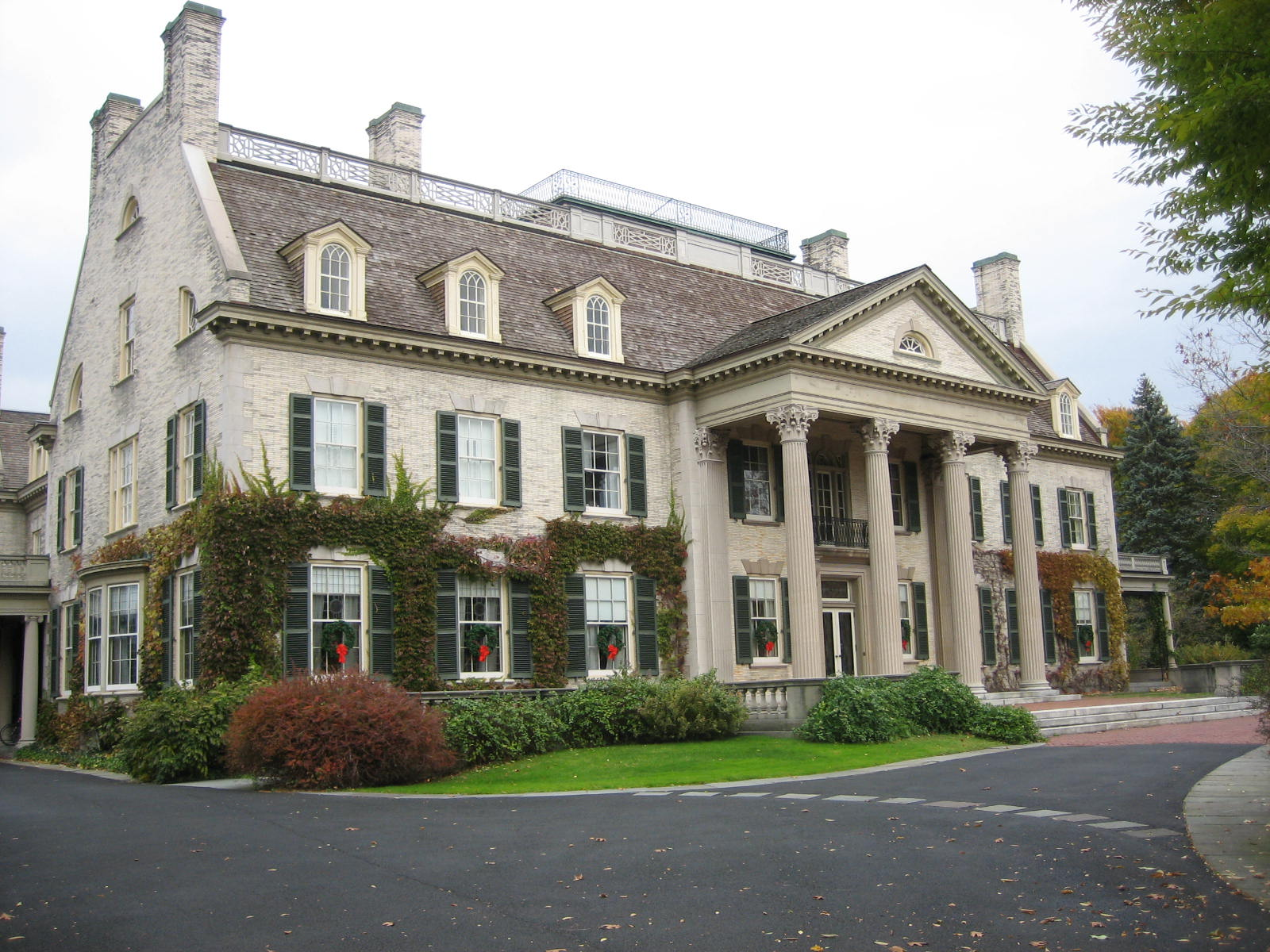
- George Eastman Museum in Rochester, New York

- Location within New York Location within the United States
- Interactive map showing the George Eastman Museum's location
- Location: 900 East Avenue, Rochester, New York, United States
- Built: 1905; 121 years ago 1949; 77 years ago (museum opened)
- Architect: J. Foster Warner; McKim, Mead and White (interiors)
- Architectural style: Georgian Revival
- Website: www.eastman.org
- NRHP reference No.: 66000529

Significant dates
- Added to NRHP: November 13, 1966
- Designated NHL: November 13, 1966

The George Eastman Museum, also referred to as George Eastman House and the International Museum of Photography and Film, is a photography museum, located on the grounds of the George Eastman's estate in Rochester, New York. Opened to the public in 1949, it is the oldest museum dedicated to photography and one of the world's oldest film archives.

Known for its collections in the fields of photography and cinema, the museum is also a leader in film preservation and photograph conservation, educating archivists and conservators from around the world. Home to the 500-seat Dryden Theatre, the museum is located on the estate of entrepreneur and philanthropist George Eastman, the founder of Eastman Kodak Company. The estate was designated a National Historic Landmark in 1966.

== History ==
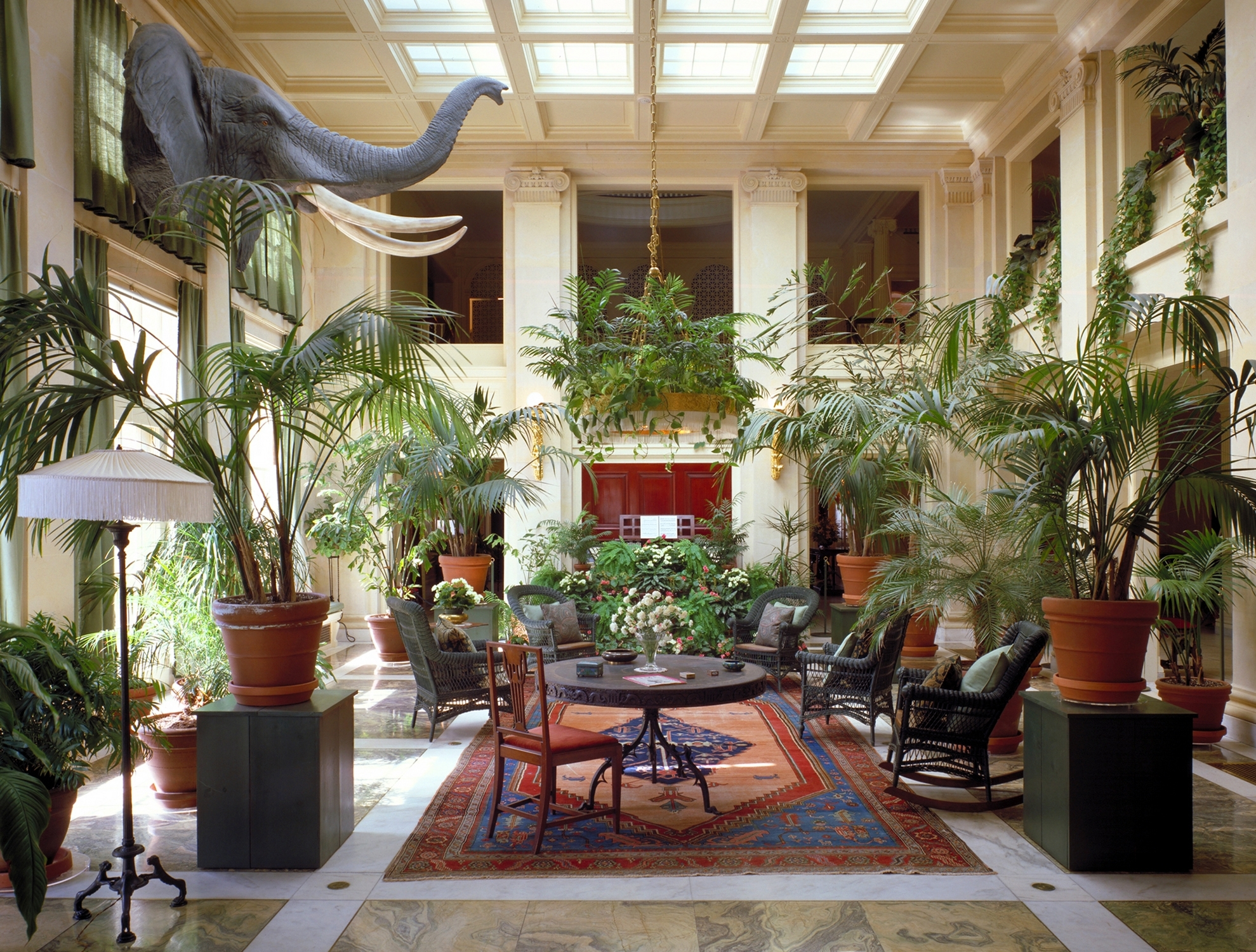
Interior

The Rochester estate of George Eastman (1854–1932) was bequeathed upon his death to the University of Rochester. The mansion served as the residence for the university president for ten years (first Benjamin Rush Rhees, then Alan Valentine). In 1948, the university donated the mansion and surrounding property to the museum and the Georgian Revival Style mansion was adapted to serve the museum's operations.

George Eastman House was chartered as a museum in 1947. From the outset, the museum's mission has been to collect, preserve, and present the history of photography and film. The museum opened its doors on November 9, 1949, displaying its core collections in the former public rooms of Eastman's house. In October 2015, the museum changed its name from George Eastman House to the George Eastman Museum.

The museum's original collections included the Medicus collection of Civil War photographs by Alexander Gardner, Eastman Kodak Company's historical collection, and the massive Gabriel Cromer collection of nineteenth-century French photography. The Eastman Museum has received donations of entire archives, corporate and individual collections, and the estates of leading photographers, as well as thousands of motion pictures and massive holdings of cinematic ephemera.

But by July 19, 1984, the museum had a $500,000 deficit, and the museum's holdings were considered by many to be among the world's finest, but with the collections growing at a rapid pace, the museum was increasingly burdened by its own success. Additional space became critical to store and study the increasing number of collected objects.

In 1985, the Smithsonian Institution was offered title and control, if it agreed to leave the Eastman Archives in Rochester and pay $1 million a year towards maintenance. The Smithsonian would appoint the director and staff and set curatorial policies.

In 1985, Kodak gave the Museum an endowment, the proceeds of the sale of its San Francisco office building, worth $13 million to $15 million on condition that it remain in Rochester, and the trustees must raise the money to build or renovate in Rochester.

In January 1989, the museum's expansion facility opened to the public.

In 1996, the museum opened the Louis B. Mayer Conservation Center in nearby Chili. One of only four film conservation centers in the United States (as of March 2006), the facility houses the museum's rare 35 mm prints made on cellulose nitrate. That same year, the Eastman House launched the first school of film preservation in the United States to teach restoration, preservation, and archiving of motion pictures. The L. Jeffrey Selznick School of Film Preservation was founded with support from The Louis B. Mayer Foundation.

In 1999, the George Eastman Museum launched the Mellon Advanced Residency Program in Photograph Conservation, made possible with grant support from the Andrew W. Mellon Foundation. The program trained top photograph archivists and conservators from around the world.

George Eastman Museum has organized numerous groundbreaking exhibitions, including New Topographics: Photographs of a Man-Altered Landscape in 1975 which helped to define the New Topographics genre.

== Governance ==
=== Directors ===
The current director of the George Eastman Museum is Bruce Barnes who was appointed in September 2012.

Directors of George Eastman Museum
Name	Tenure
Oscar N. Solbert	1947–1958
Beaumont Newhall	1958–1971
Van Deren Coke	1971–1972
Robert J. Doherty	1972–1981
Robert A. Mayer	1981–1989
James L. Enyeart	1989–1995
Anthony Bannon	1996–2012
Bruce Barnes	2012–present

=== Board of trustees ===
The George Eastman Museum is headed by a board of trustees. Nannette Nocon is the current board chair.

=== Finances ===
The George Eastman Museum's annual budget is approximately $10 million. As of December 2014, its endowment exceeded $35 million.

== Collections ==
The museum's holdings comprise more than 400,000 photographs and negatives dating from the invention of photography to the present day; 28,000 motion picture films; three million other cinematic objects, including letters, scripts, musical scores, lobby cards, posters, film stills, and celebrity portraits; more than 16,000 objects of photographic and cinematographic technology; an internationally renowned research collection of books, periodicals, and other materials on photography and moving images; and George Eastman's home furnishings and decorative arts, personal and business correspondence, private library, photographs, negatives, films, and related personal items.

=== Photography collection ===
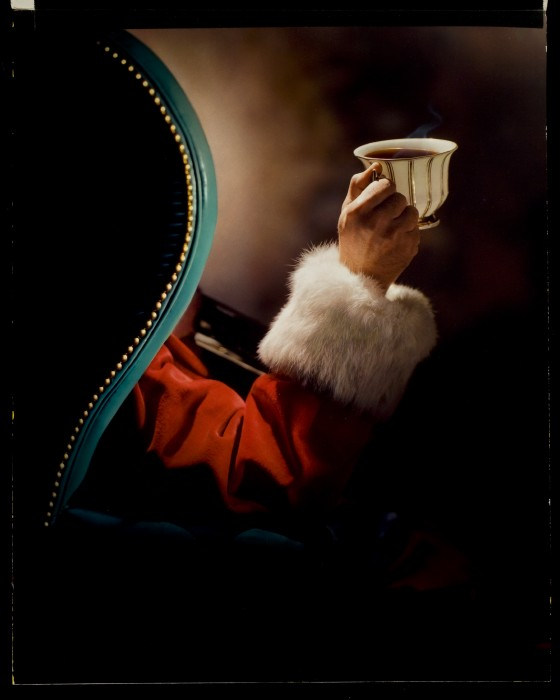
"A&P, COFFEE, SANTA CLAUS", 1958, photograph by Nickolas Muray

The photography collection embraces numerous landmark processes, objects of great rarity, and monuments of art history that trace the evolution of the medium as a technology, as a means of scientific and historical documentation, and as one of the most potent and accessible means of personal expression of the modern era. More than 14,000 photographers are represented in the collection, including virtually all the major figures in the history of the medium. The collection includes original vintage works produced by nearly every process and printing medium employed. Notable holdings include:

- One of the world's largest collection of daguerreotypes, including more than 1,000 by Southworth & Hawes
- A major collection of nineteenth-century photographs of the American West by photographers including Carleton Watkins, Eadweard Muybridge, Timothy H. O'Sullivan, and William Henry Jackson
- A major collection of ca. 1890s–1910s glass negatives from French photojournalist Charles Chusseau-Flaviens
- The photographic estates of Lewis Hine, Edward Steichen, Alvin Langdon Coburn, Nickolas Muray and Victor Keppler
- A major collection of Ansel Adams' early and vintage prints

The museum's collection includes works by leading contemporary artists, including Andy Warhol, Candida Höfer, David Levinthal, Cindy Sherman, Adam Fuss, Vik Muniz, Gillian Wearing, Ori Gersht, Mickalene Thomas, Chris McCaw, and Matthew Brandt.

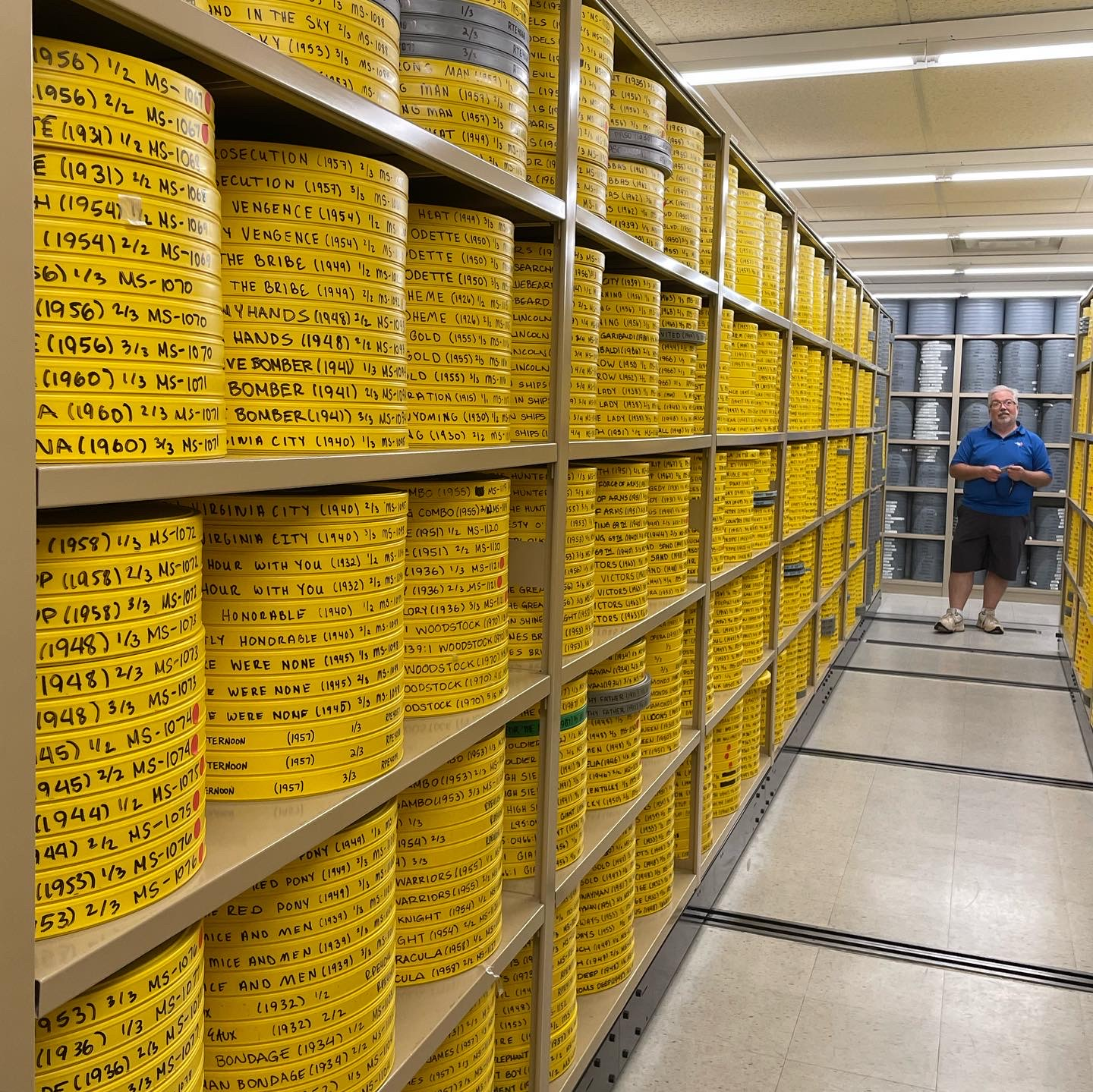
Part of the 16mm film collection at George Eastman House

=== Moving image collection ===
The George Eastman Museum Motion Picture Collection is one of the major moving image archives in the United States. It was established in 1949 by the first curator of film, James Card (1915–2000) who helped to build the George Eastman Museum as a leading force in the field with holdings of over 25,000 titles and a collection of stills, posters and papers with over 3 million artifacts. The George Eastman Museum's collection includes the complete moving-image works of William Kentridge.

=== George Eastman Legacy Collection ===
This collection includes George Eastman's house and the George Eastman Archive and Study Center. Opened in April 1999, the George Eastman Archive and Study Center contains Eastman's personal possessions and documents pertaining to Kodak's early history. It has over half a million items within its climate controlled vault. The archive is accessible from the second floor of the house. Items within the house itself include fragments of Eastman's coffin, a mounted elephant head, and an Aeolian pipe organ.

=== Fire ===
On May 30, 1978, a two-alarm fire affecting four buildings resulted in the loss of some rare movie films and still photographs in the collection, including the original negatives to pre-1951 films produced by Metro-Goldwyn-Mayer's cartoon department, much of which only survived by way of Gold Medal Reprints, reissued versions with master positives stored by MGM and later Turner Entertainment Co.

== George Eastman Awards ==
The George Eastman Museum established the George Eastman Award for distinguished contribution to the art of film in 1955 as the first award given by an American film archive and museum to honor artistic work of enduring value.

=== Recipients ===
- 1965 – Fred Astaire (Actor)
- 1973 – Johnny Weissmuller (Actor)
- 1975 – Blanche Sweet (Actor)
- 1976 – George Cukor (Director), Karl Struss (Cinematographer)
- 1978 – James Stewart (Actor), Willard Van Dyke (Director)
- 1982 – Joan Bennett (Actor), Louise Brooks (Actor), Dolores del Río (Actor), Myrna Loy (Actor), Maureen O'Sullivan (Actor), Luise Rainer (Actor), Sylvia Sidney (Actor)
- 1987 – Gregory Peck (Actor)
- 1990 – Lauren Bacall (Actor)
- 1992 – Audrey Hepburn (Actor)
- 1994 – Martin Scorsese (Filmmaker)
- 1997 – Isabella Rossellini (Actor)
- 1999 – Meryl Streep (Actor)
- 2003 – Kim Novak (Actor)
- 2012 – Richard Gere (Actor, Activist)
- 2013 – Roger Corman (Director, Producer, Distributor)
- 2015 – Michael Douglas (Actor, Producer)
- 2016 – Michael Keaton (Actor)
- 2017 – Vittorio Storaro (Cinematographer)
- 2019 – Julia Roberts (Actor, Producer)
- 2023 – Jodie Foster (Actor, Director)
- 2024 – Goldie Hawn (Actor, Producer)
- 2025 – Rita Moreno (Actress)
- 2026 – Octavia Spencer (Actress)

== George Eastman's estate ==
George Eastman built his residence at 900 East Avenue between 1902 and 1905. He created a unique urban estate complete with 10.5 acres (42,000 m^{2}) of working farm land, formal gardens, greenhouses, stables, barns, pastures, and a 35,000-square-foot (3,300 m^{2}), 50-room Colonial Revival mansion with a fireproof structure made of reinforced concrete.

Eastman's house presented a neoclassical Georgian Revival facade of decorative craftsmanship. Beneath this exterior were such modern conveniences as an electrical generator, an internal telephone system with 21 stations, a built-in vacuum cleaning system, a central clock network, an elevator, and a great Aeolian pipe organ. Eastman used the house as a center of the city's rich musical life from 1905 until his death in 1932.

Photography is encouraged. According to the museum, the estate is "popular for ....family, engagement, and senior photos".

The estate was declared a National Historic Landmark in 1966.
