= Montrouge Cemetery =

Cemetery in Paris, France

Coordinates: 48°49′20″N 2°19′9″E

Montrouge Cemetery (French: Cimetière de Montrouge) is a cemetery in the south of the 14th arrondissement of Paris, located between the Boulevards of the Marshals and Boulevard Périphérique. It was created in 1819 in the commune of Montrouge, but was transferred to the City of Paris in 1925 following a border change.

Whilst the most visited grave is that of Coluche, there are many other graves of interest, as well as a crypt. Despite being a Parisian cemetery, the influence of Montrouge is noteworthy, most notably through the granite stele commemorating 96 soldiers from Montrouge fallen on World War I battlegrounds.

== Selection of personalities buried in the cemetery ==
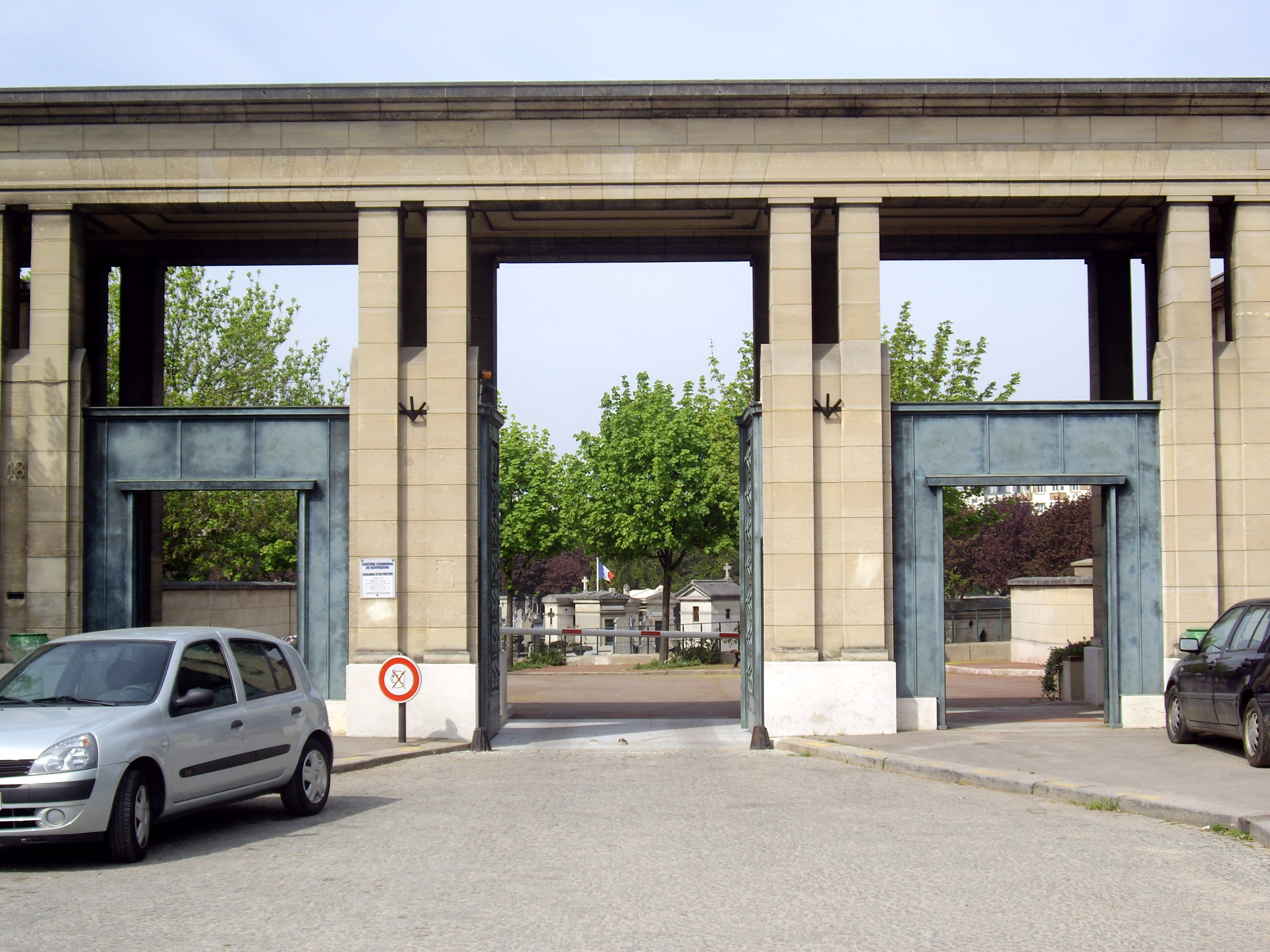
Cemetery entrance

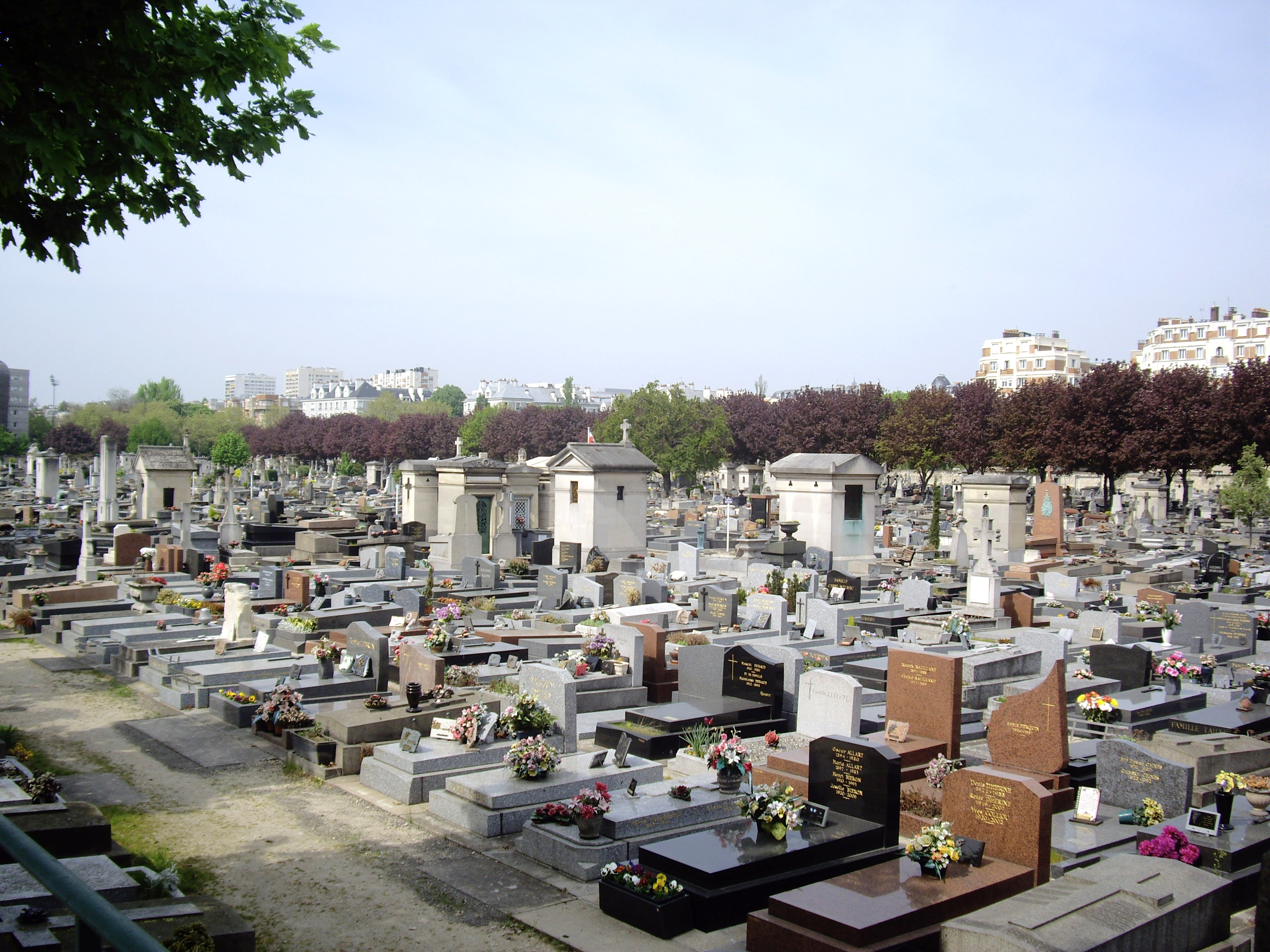
View of the northern part of the cemetery

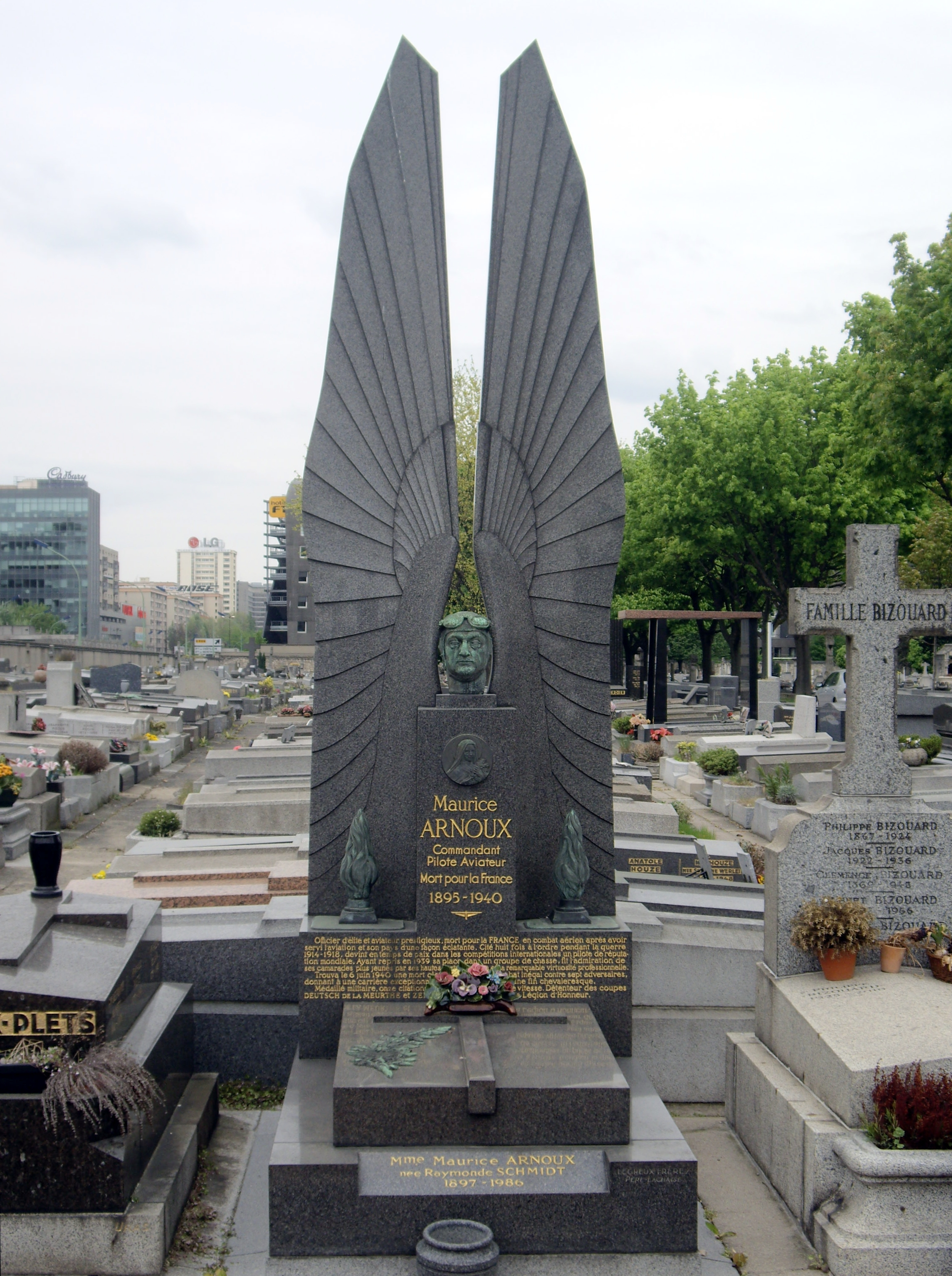
View of the south dominated by the tomb of Maurice Arnoux

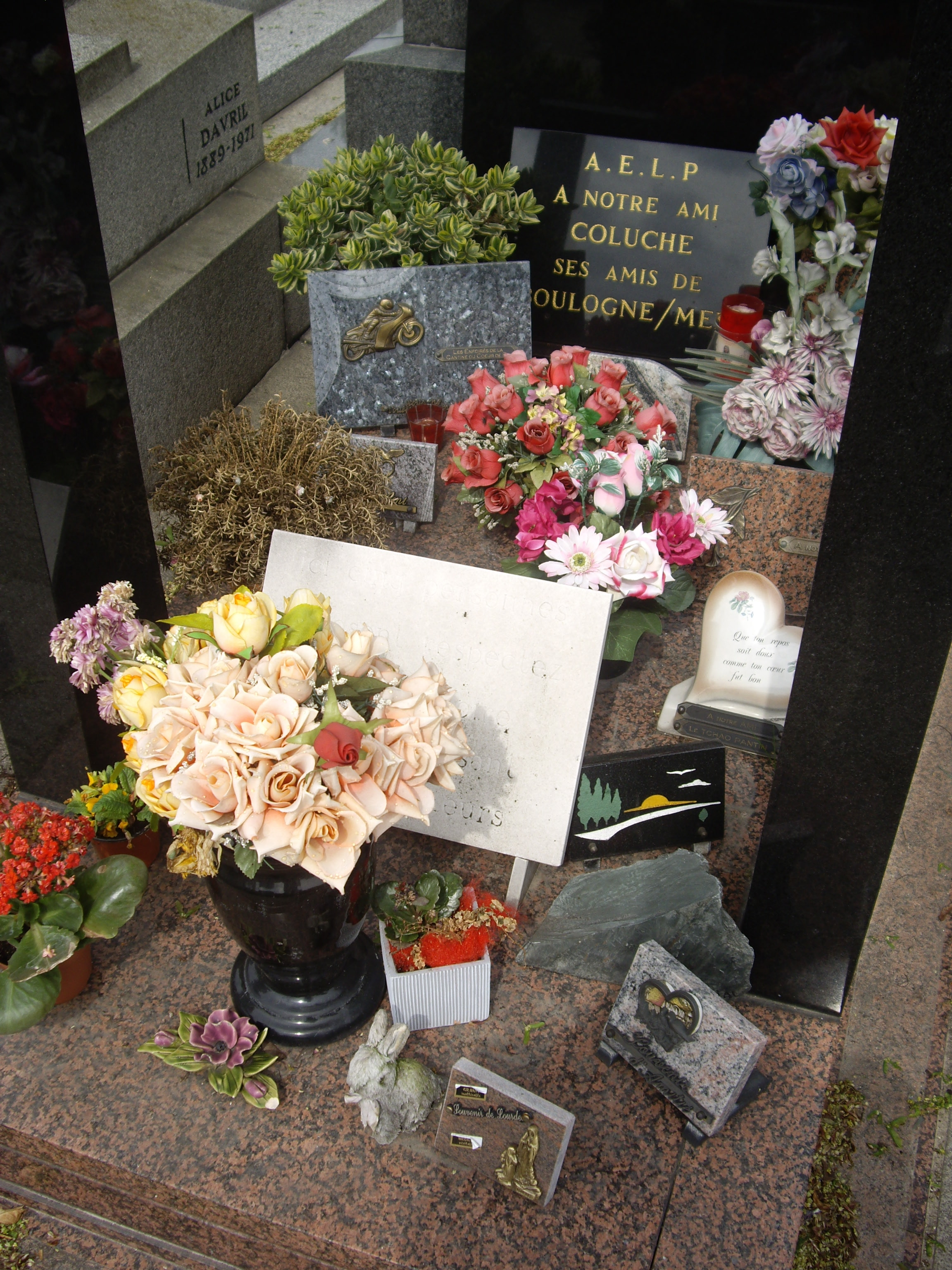
Coluche's grave, always flowery

Grave	Name	Dates	Désignation
	Maurice Arnoux	1895–1940	aviator
	Odile Astié	1941–1980	first French stunt woman
	Michel Audiard	1920–1985	dialoguist, screenwriter and director
	Jurgis Baltrušaitis	1873–1944	Lithuanian symbolist poet and translator
	Émile Bégin	1802–1888	physician and historian
	István Beöthy	1897–1961	sculptor and architect of Hungarian origin
	Georges Biscot	1889–1944	actor and singer
	Eugénie Buffet	1866–1934	singer of music hall
	Cécile Cerf; Marcel Cerf	1916–1973; 1911–2010	Resistant historian
	Pierre Clerget	1875–1943	engineer and inventor
	Coluche	1944–1986	comedian and actor
	René Crevel	1900–1935	surrealist writer and poet
	Gabriel Cromer	1873–1934	photographer and collector
	Georges Cusin	1902–1964	stage and film actor
	Jules Déchin	1869–1947	statuary (buried with his stepfather Louis Noël)
	Emmanuel Dolivet	1854–1910	sculptor
	Maurice Escande	1892–1973	stage and film actor
	Félix Fourdrain	1880–1923	organist and composer
	Pierre-Gilles de Gennes	1932–2007	physicist, Collège de France faculty, Nobel prize
	Gustave Geffroy	1855–1926	journalist, art critic, historian and novelist
	Henri Ginoux	1909–1994	mayor of Montrouge
	Albert Kazimirski de Biberstein	1808–1887	orientalist of Polish origin
	Grégory Ken	1947–1996	singer
	Alphonse Kirchhoffer	1873–1913	foil fencing master
	Georges Kirsch	1892–1969	aviator and test pilot
	Ernest La Jeunesse	1874–1917	journalist and drama critic
	Lina Margy	1914–1973	singer
	Jacques Paul Migne (called Abbé Migne)	1800–1875	priest and publisher (buried in the crypt)
	Germaine Montero	1909–2000	comedian and singer
	Henri Mouillefarine	1910–1994	racing cyclist
	Dimitri Navachine	1889–1937	Russian politician and economist
	Louis Noël	1839–1925	sculptor (buried with his son in law Jules Déchin)
	Charles Pélissier	1903–1959	racing cyclist
	Henri Queffélec	1910–1992	writer
	Lucien Rosengart	1881–1976	car manufacturer
	Albert Simonin	1905–1980	writer and scriptwriter
	Nicolas de Staël	1914–1955	painter of Russian origin
	André Tollet	1913–2001	union leader
