= Bruce Barnes =

Bruce Barnes may refer to:

- Bruce Barnes (executive) (born 1962), American investment banker and business executive
- Bruce Barnes (tennis) (1909–1990), American tennis player
- Bruce Barnes (Left Behind), a fictional character in the Left Behind series
- Bruce Barnes (American football) (born 1951), punter in the National Football League
