= Sagaie =

Sagaie may refer to:

- ERC 90 Sagaie, a French armoured vehicle
- French destroyer Sagaie, a destroyer of the French Navy
- a car that was designed, but not built, by Automobiles L. Rosengart
