= Robert A. Mayer =

Robert A. Mayer (born 1933; died December 2, 2008, Scottsdale, AZ) was the fifth director of the George Eastman Museum (then George Eastman House) from 1981 to 1989. He also served as President of the Museum Association of New York from 1986 - 1988. Mayer made the disputed proposal to transfer the museum's collections of photographs, films and cameras to the Smithsonian Institution in Washington. The museum's trustees initially approved the transfer in 1985, but later rescinded the move and initiated a $10.5 million fund-raising campaign, of which $7.8 million was spent to construct a building designed to house the collections. Mayer then briefly served as the executive director of the New York State Council on the Arts. Between 1990 and 1997 he was President and Chief Executive Officer of the Cleveland Institute of Art, and then retired to Scottsdale, AZ.

== Publication ==
- Mayer, Robert A. (1986). Blacks in America: a photographic record. Rochester, N.Y.: International Museum of Photography at George Eastman House. p. 60. ISBN 0935398120.
