= Automobiles L. Rosengart =

Automobiles L. Rosengart was a French automobile manufacturer that was active from 1927 to 1955.

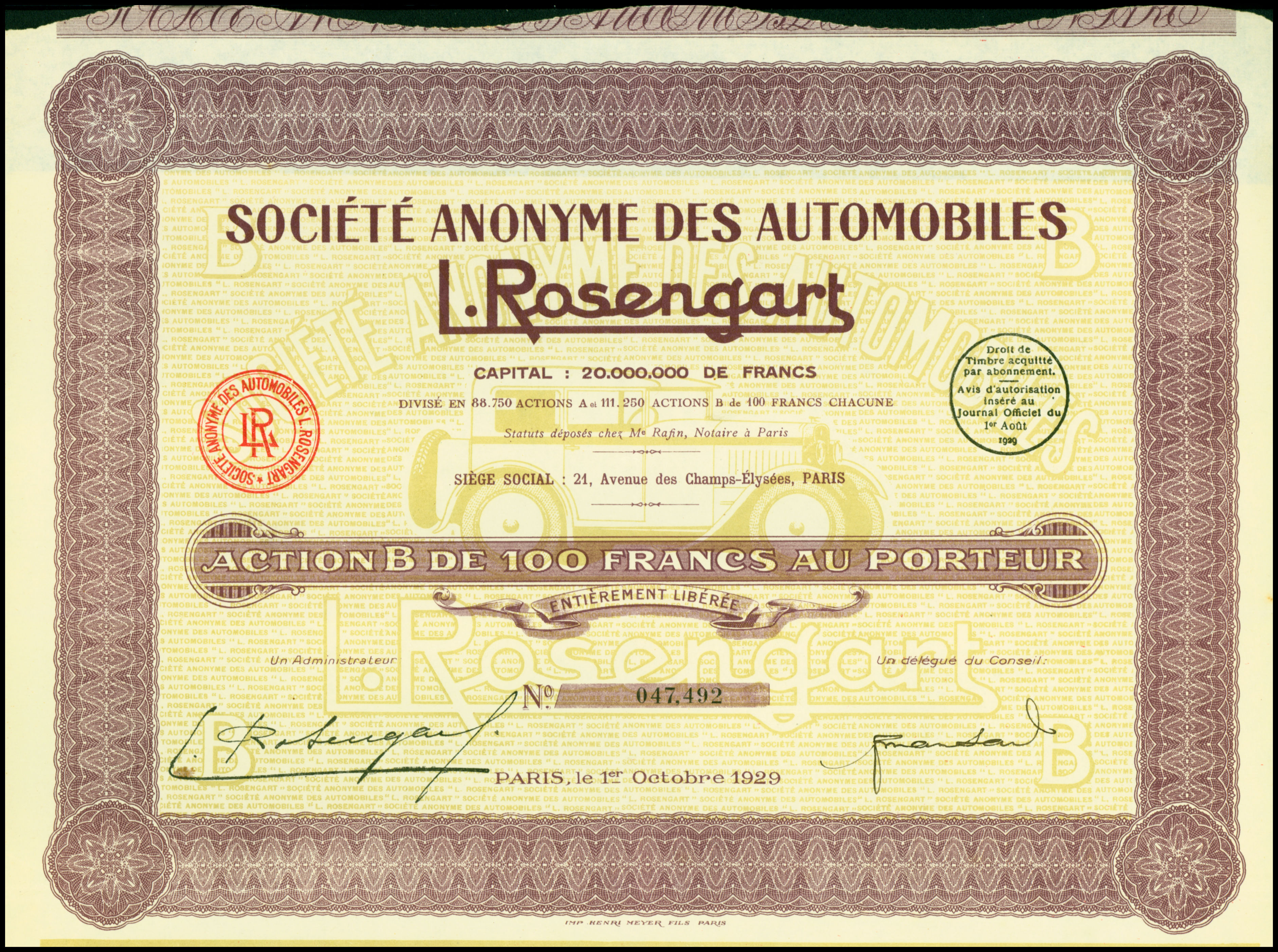
Share of the S.A. des Automobiles L. Rosengart, issued 1. October 1929

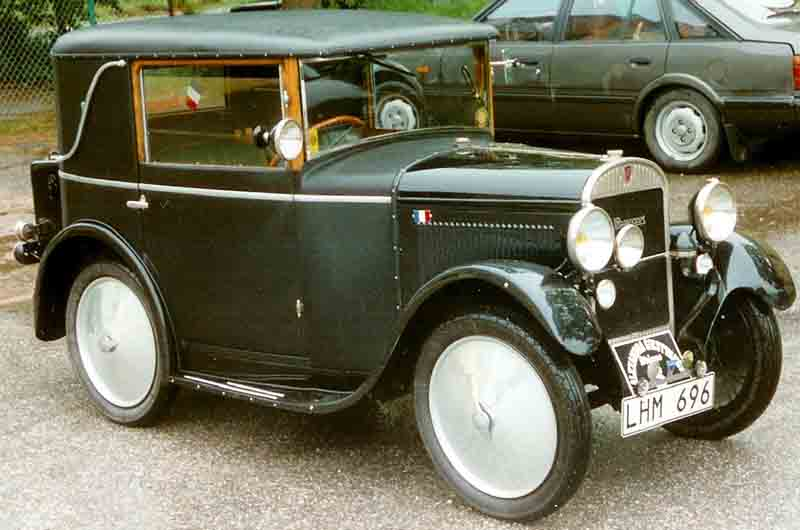
Rosengart LR4 1928

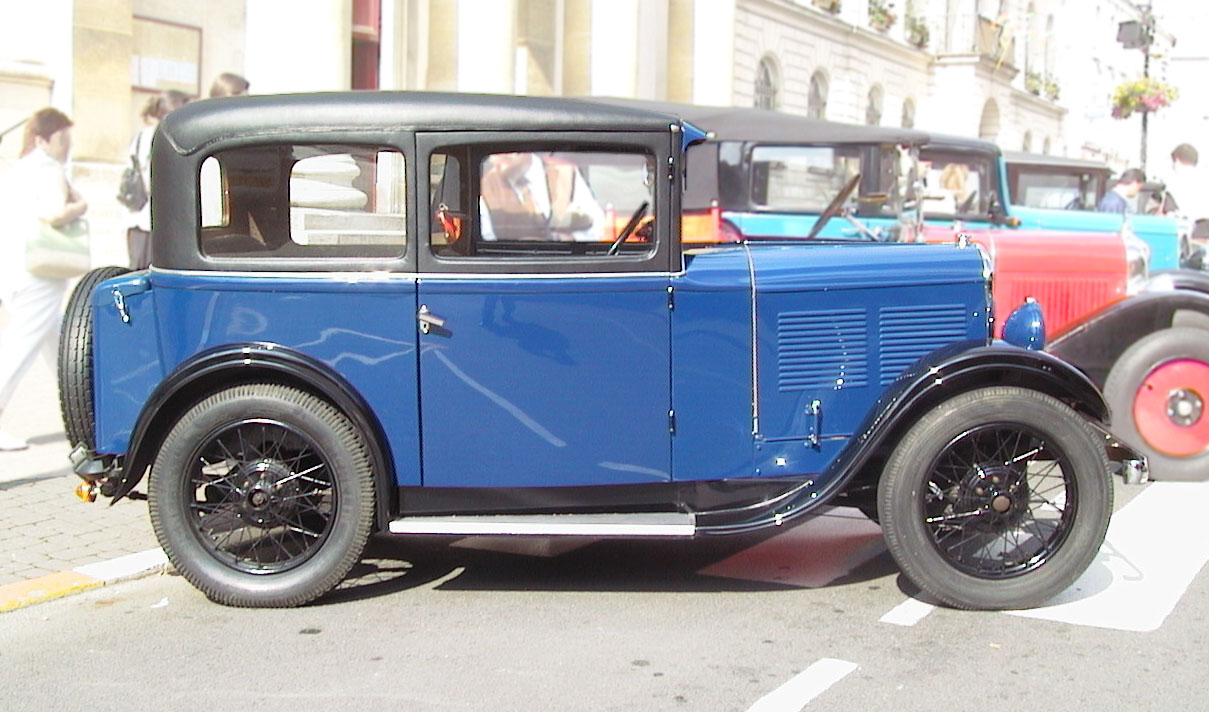
The Rosengart LR2

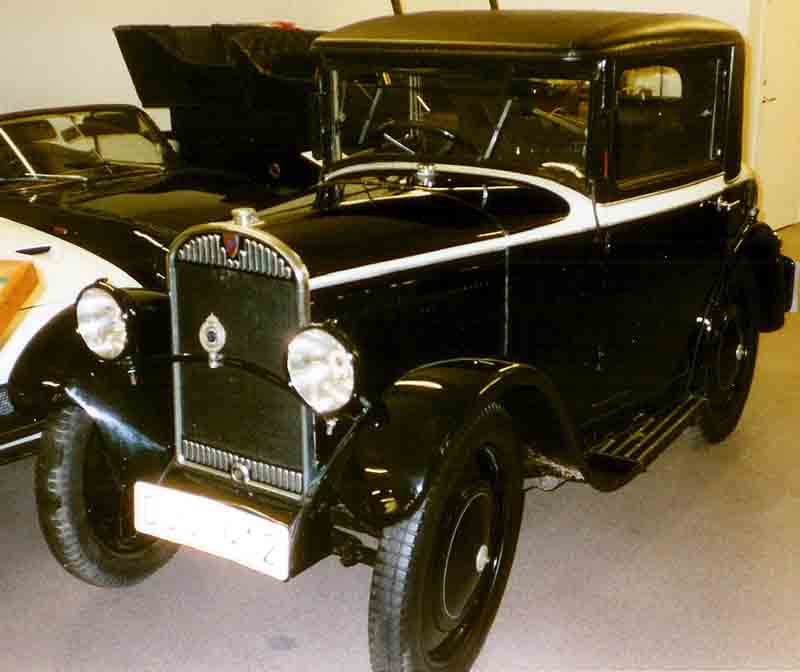
Rosengart Cabriolet 1930

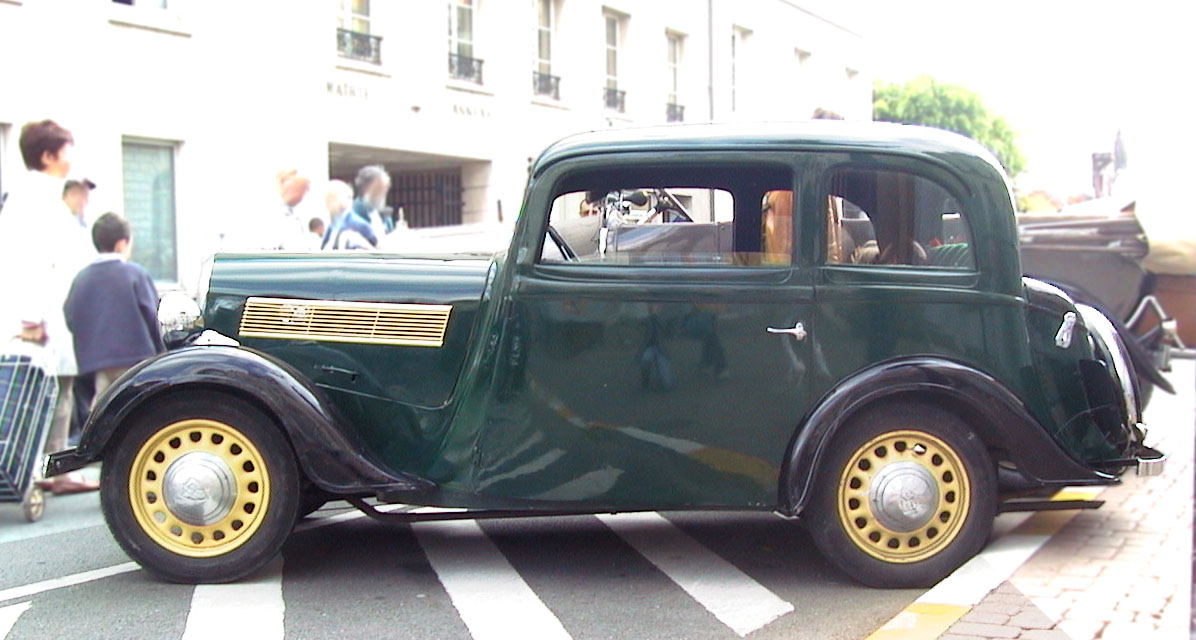
The Rosengart LR4n

== The founder ==
Lucien Rosengart (1881 - 1976) was a gifted engineer and businessman who had established a successful engineering business by the time he was 24. In the mid-1920s, he saw the opportunity to produce a very small car for a segment of the market in France that he believed was not being properly covered by any of the major players. In 1923 he purchased a license to build the English Austin 7 and with support from the engineer Jules Salomon he purchased the old Bellanger factory in the 17th arrondissement of Paris. The site was a large one and in the early years the business appeared set to fill it.

== Beginnings ==
At the plant on the Boulevard de Dixmude, in 1927 production began of the Rosengart LR2 automobile which appeared on the market in 1928, at the same time as the precursor of the first BMW automobile, also an Austin 7 built under licence, was appearing in Germany. Numerous variants of the Rosengart LR2 were produced and the car remained in production at least till 1939.

The LR2 was promoted for its reliability. A production car driven by François Lecot covered 900 km (560 mi) per day for more than three and a half months until it had notched up 100,000 km (62,000 mi) without any major mishap, and in the same period an LR2 achieved a class win in 80 of the 81 sporting trials in which it participated.

From 1931 the car appeared in modified form as the Rosengart LR4, now heavily differentiated from its Austin origins but still using the same 747-cc engine and three-speed gearbox. The model's robust character was demonstrated by several long distance trials. It was marketed simply as the Rosengart Cinq, reflecting the car's five tax horsepower rating. Variations on this model would survive until the 1950s, always retaining the original short 2,200 mm (86.6 in) wheelbase. Two longer wheelbases were also available until about 1935; the 2.35 m (92.5 in) LR44/47 and the 2.6 m (102.4 in) LR45. A further substantial upgrade of Rosengart's small car took place in August 1935 with the appearance of the more powerful Rosengart Supercinq ("Super Five"). Thanks to an aluminium head and other modifications, power increased from 11 to 18 hp (8 to 13 kW). Marketed as the Super Cinq, the original Cinq remained available alongside as a lower cost alternative.

Rosengart only offered the shortest wheelbase on the Supercinq, which was given the LR4N2 model code. Shortly thereafter the LR4R1 appeared, largely identical except for having a four-speed gearbox. In 1938 the LR4N2 gained one horsepower while losing one tax horsepower, now being rated at 19 hp (14 kW) and 4 CV.

In the early 1930s Rosengart teamed up with the German manufacturer Adler, offering license built copies of the Adler Trumpf and Trumpf Junior, small front-drive cars that bolstered its range. It also added a conventional rear-driven car along the lines of a stretched and widened Austin. The development of front-wheel drive models led to the elegant Rosengart Supertraction model in 1937 - which competed with larger cars like the Peugeot 402 and the Berliet Dauphine for the first time in Rosengart's short history.

Unfortunately the larger cars failed to sell in numbers sufficient to justify the investment involved, and while the small cars achieved relatively satisfactory volumes, the slim margins at the lower end of the market provided a clue as to why the mainstream French auto-makers had tended to avoid it. In 1936 Rosengart himself was in financial difficulties and he transferred the company to a new organisation, Societé Industrielle de l'Ouest Parisien (SIOP).

== War and aftermath ==
Production of the Supertraction was never large, and the factory was destroyed by the German Army following the German invasion. The business was able to survive the German occupation but did not produce cars during the conflict. After the war Lucien Rosengart, who spent the war in exile in the United States, returned to France and tried to guide his company back to the production of the small cars on which its success in the 1920s and 1930s had been based. Unfortunately, the several major manufacturers of France were by then making very small, economical cars that were very well suited to the conditions of post-war France, achieving sales volumes and economies of scale that the Rosengart branded car from SIOP were quite unable to match, leaving the Neuilly plant massively underutilised.

== Postwar ==
The first small vehicle to arrive after the war was a 400 kg (882 lb) light van called the Rosengart Vivor which was based on the LR4 model of the 1930s, but available only as a light van or, with side windows on the rear side panels, "break". Production peaked in 1951 with only 873 produced, and in 1953, a year in which just 373 had been manufactured, Vivor production ended.

In October 1946 the company exhibited the prototype “Rosengart Super 5” at the Paris Motor Show at the instigation of Lucien Rosengart himself. However, support for the Super 5 from the Societé Industrielle de l'Ouest Parisien (SIOP) itself (which had held the controlling interest in the business since 1936) was less than whole hearted. Soon after this Rosengart disposed of his residual financial interest in the business that still bore his name, and seems progressively to have withdrawn his involvement. After the war Rosengart was not one of the automakers selected for inclusion in the post-war Pons Plan. The Pons Plan reflected government determination to structure the French auto-industry according to priorities identified by politicians and civil servants: exclusion from it created great difficulties in obtaining necessary permissions and materials.

Little more was heard of the "Super 5", but late the next year, 1947, the company returned to the Paris Motor Show with two examples of the new "Rosengart Supertrahuit". The letters "tra" referred to the fact that the car again featured front wheel drive (traction avant) and "huit" was a reference to its eight (huit) cylinder engine. One of the cars on the exhibition stand was a substantial two-door, four-seater coupé and the other was a cabriolet version of what was in other respects the same design. The 3,100 mm (122.0 in) wheel base and the 4,950 mm (194.9 in) length could easily have accommodated a four-door sedan, but it seems that none was contemplated. The manufacturer hoped, with this car, to be added to the three auto-makers already incorporated in the all-important Pons Plan not as an automaker selling into the impoverished domestic market, but as a specialty car manufacturer focused on export sales, joining Delahaye-Delage, Hotchkiss, and Talbot in this category. Although recognised for its elegance, the car was not helped in this politically sensitive period by the manufacturer's decision to fit an American 3,917 cc engine supplied by Ford's Mercury division. There is no record of the manufacturer having persuaded the government to incorporate Rosengart into some revised Pons Plan, and it is not clear how many of the Rosengart Supertrahuit models were actually produced for sale.

== The Ariette ==
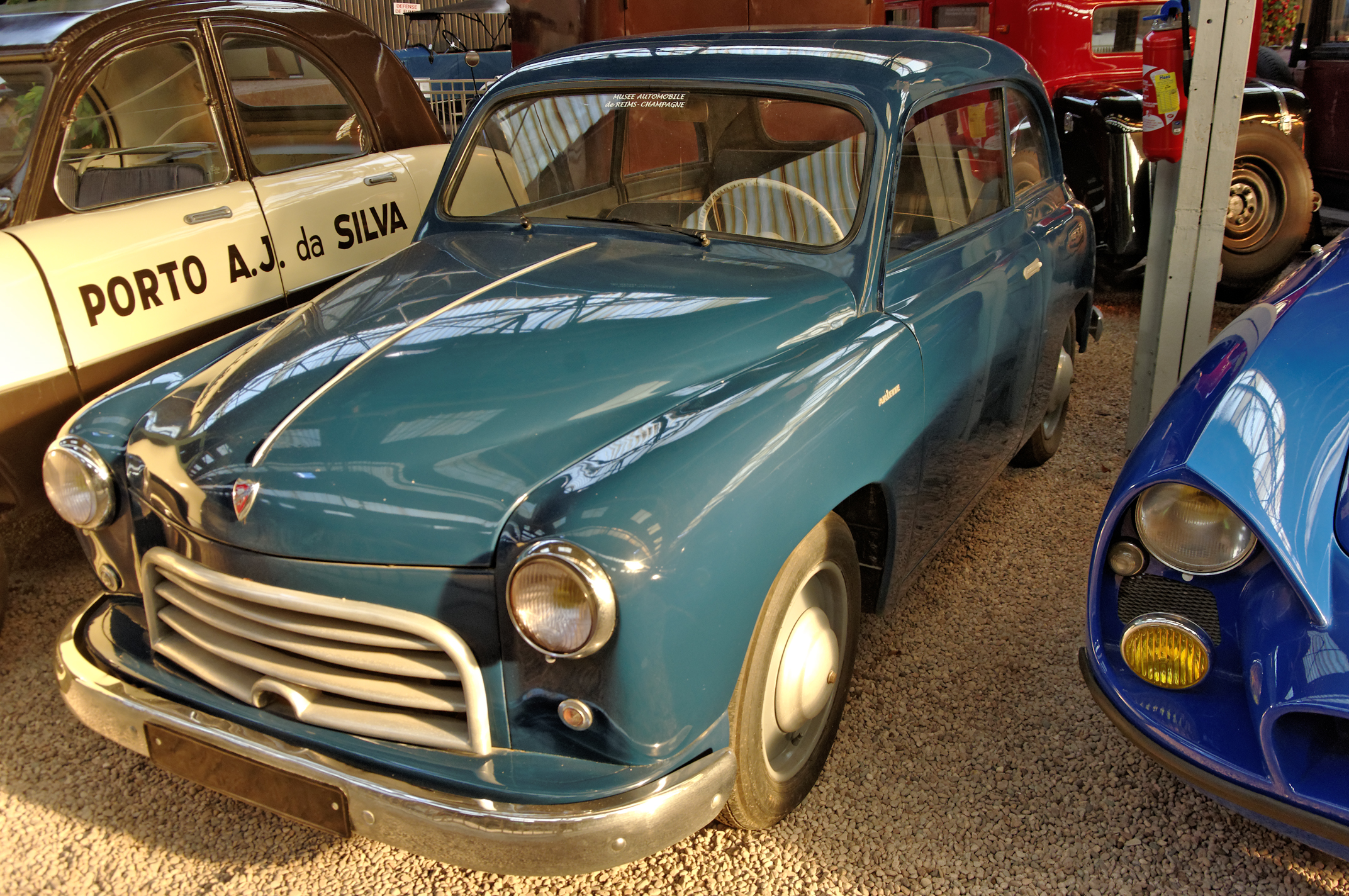
Rosengart Ariette - 1953

The last Rosengart car, the Ariette, was introduced at the Paris Motor Show towards the end of 1951. The small car featured a two-door four seater modern body styled by Philippe Charbonneaux which received a favourable reception on the show stand, but the body failed to distract attention from the car's “anaemic” performance. The 747 cc engine had offered adequate power when first used by the Austin 7 in 1922, and the 21 hp (16 kW) claimed for it in the 1951 Rosengart was a higher output than had been achieved when the company had first used the unit in 1927. A four-speed gear box with synchromesh on the top two ratios and the car's relatively light weight at 720 kg (1,587 lb) would have made the best of the available power, but the engine in the modern looking car was old and outclassed: the available power was inadequate when set against the asking price which, by 1952, was 668,500 francs. The price may have been justified by the level of the fixed costs to be amortised from the company's large plant in Neuilly, but for a customer able to buy a standard 21 hp (16 kW) Renault 4CV for 458,000 francs (or 399,000 francs for the reduced specification Renault 4CV Service) the price of the Rosengart must have been hard to justify.

1952 saw the arrival of an Ariette break (station wagon) to replace the unsuccessful Vivor. The break was some 15 kg (33 lb) heavier than the Ariette saloon at 735 kg (1,620 lb) and offered an impressive maximum load capacity of 500 kg (1,102 lb).

Mindful of the uncompetitive price of the Ariette, early in 1953 the company (following the example set a few months earlier by the Renault 4CV Service) introduced a stripped-down version called the Artisane. It shared the body shell of the Ariette but without the chrome décor or the wheel trims. The bumpers were coated only in paint and the car was available only in a dark shade of grey. Inside everything that could be removed was, including the back seat. The Artisane was priced at 599,000 francs which was a saving of more than 10% on the price of an Ariette, but by this time the market reception for the Rosengart Artisane was no longer the critical issue.

== The end ==
A few weeks after the end of the 1952 Paris Motor Show the Societé Industrielle de l'Ouest Parisien (SIOP company) was forced to file for bankruptcy. Financially the founder of the Rosengart auto-business, Lucien Rosengart was little affected since he had sold the business, including the right to use the Rosengart name, to SIOP in 1936. By now, aged 72, he had retired to the south, and had not been in day-to-day contact with the business for several years.

Late in 1952 the gates of the Neuilly plant were closed with the loss of 1,700 jobs. Following negotiation with bankers and other creditors the plant was reopened early in 1953 and production of the Ariette resumed at the rate of approximately four per day, with plans for a rapid increase in those volumes. However, the underlying problem remained that the car could not be sold at a competitive price without selling in large numbers, and it could not sell in large numbers because the price was not competitive.

The company closed its doors in the summer of 1955, after failing to launch its new car, the Sagaie, a development of the Ariette with a flat-twin engine.
