= Maurice Arnoux =

French flying ace

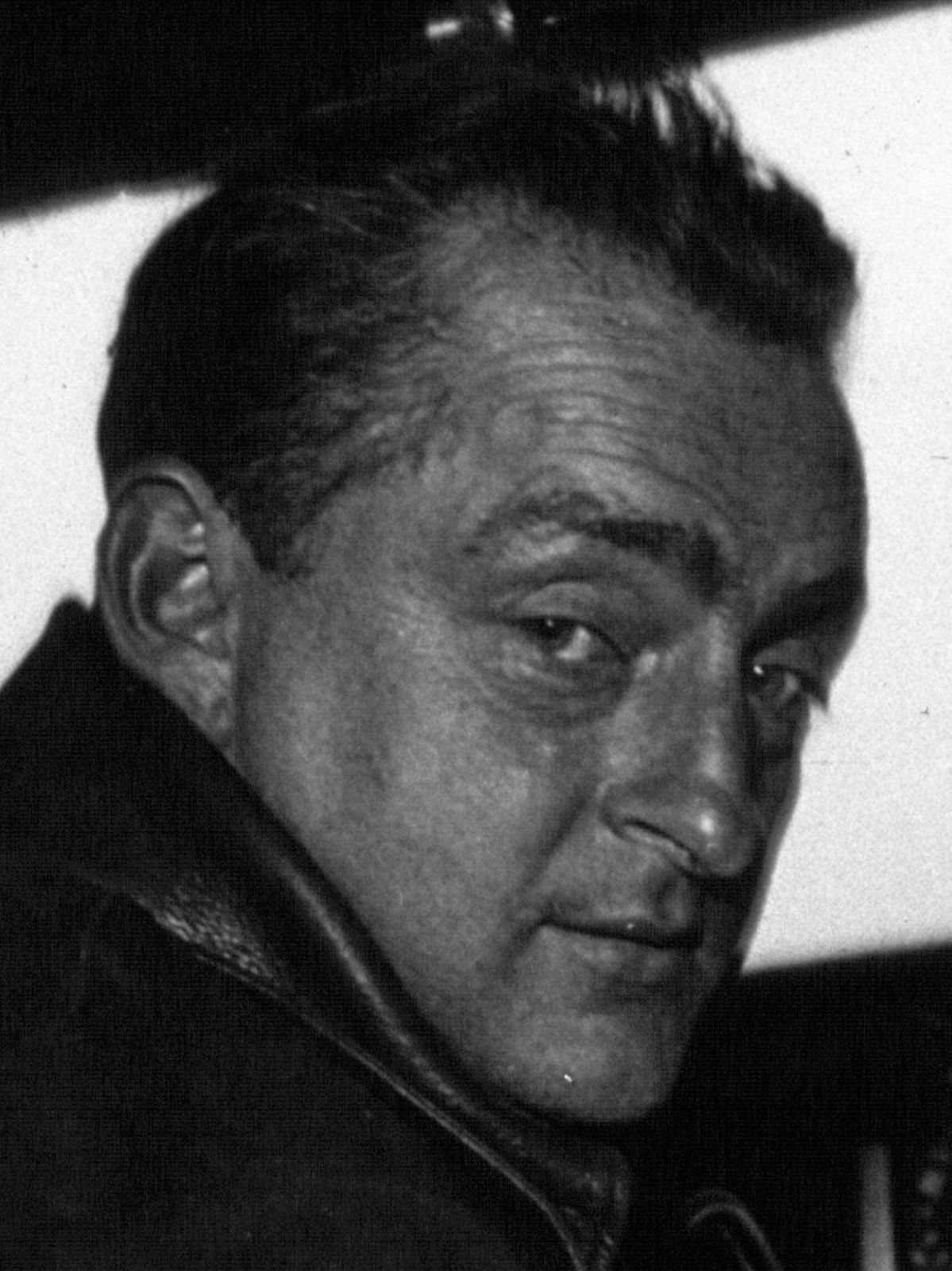
- Maurice Arnoux,1936
- Born: Maurice Albert Alfred Jean Arnoux; 7 September 1895; Montrouge, Hauts-de-Seine, France
- Died: 6 June 1940 (aged 44)
- Burial place: Montrouge Cemetery, Paris; 48°49′20″N 2°19′9″E
- Military career
- Allegiance: France
- Branch: French Army; French Air Force
- Service years: 1914–1918, 1939–1940
- Rank: Commandant
- Units: MF49; MF55; N49/Spa49
- Awards: Légion d'honneur Médaille militaire Croix de Guerre
- Other work: Air racing/record attempts; service in World War II

Commandant Maurice Albert Alfred Jean Arnoux (7 September 1895 – 6 June 1940) was a French World War I flying ace credited with five aerial victories. After the end of the First World War, he continued his aviation career during the 1930s as an air racer and aviation record setter until the Second World War. He returned to flying fighter planes during the early days of World War II, but was killed in action in 1940.

== World War I service ==
On 19 December 1914, Arnoux was inducted for military service with the 2e Groupe d'Aviation. He was stationed on the Serbian front as a driver until February 1916. After being decorated by the Serbs, he was returned to France for pilot's training. On 23 May 1916, he was granted Military Pilot's Brevet No. 3539. After some further flying experience, he was trained on Nieuport fighters. On 13 April 1917, he was assigned to a Nieuport squadron, Escadrille 49. He shared a victory with a squadron-mate on 28 June 1917. During the latter part of 1918, he would share two victories over enemy aircraft; he would also single-handedly destroy two German observation balloons.

== Civilian flying career ==
Arnoux took part in many air races and events during the 1930s. In August 1931 he took part in the Dunlop Cup Tour of France, flying a Farman 234, and came second, winning 12,000 francs. The following year he entered the same aircraft in the Challenge International de Tourisme. In the Technical Tests, held at Staaken, Berlin, his aircraft managed only 39th place out of 41, and in the subsequent race around Europe, a distance of approximately 4,530 miles (7,290 km) over six days, he came 23rd out of 24 to complete the race.

On 2 June 1933 he competed in the first Douze Heures d'Angers race, a competition confined to tourist two-seater aircraft with engines no larger than 8 litres. Flown around triangular course based at the Avrille Aerodrome at Angers, the race was to cover the furthest distance in twelve hours, combining endurance with speed. Arnoux flew a Farman 356 fitted with a Renault Bengali engine, covering 1,992 kilometres (1,238 mi) at an average speed of 166.5 km/h (103.5 mph), and coming in 6th place.

In May 1934 Arnoux won the Coupe Deutsch de la Meurthe, flying a Caudron low-wing cantilever monoplane, fitted with a 300 hp Renault six-cylinder engine. The 2,000-kilometre (1,200 mi) race was flown from Étampes-Mondésir Aerodrome over a 100-kilometre (62 mi) triangular course, and Arnoux completed it 5 hours 8 minutes and 31 seconds, at an average speed of 389 km/h (242 mph). Soon afterwards, in June, he made a presentation flight in his winning aircraft at an Anglo-French event at Buc Aerodrome to celebrate the 25th anniversary of Louis Blériot's 1909 flight across the English channel, which was attended by Blériot himself, President Albert Lebrun, the French Air Minister General Victor Denain, British Air Minister Lord Londonderry and Air Vice-Marshal Philip Joubert de la Ferté. The following year however, he only managed third place.

In July 1935 he won the third Douze Heures d'Angers, flying 2,041 miles (3,285 km) in twelve hours at an average speed of 170 mph (270 km/h) in a Caudron C.430 Rafale. In August 1935, flying a Caudron monoplane with a Renault engine, he set a new speed record for 100 kilometres (62 mi) carrying a passenger. His speed was approximately 285 mph (459 km/h).

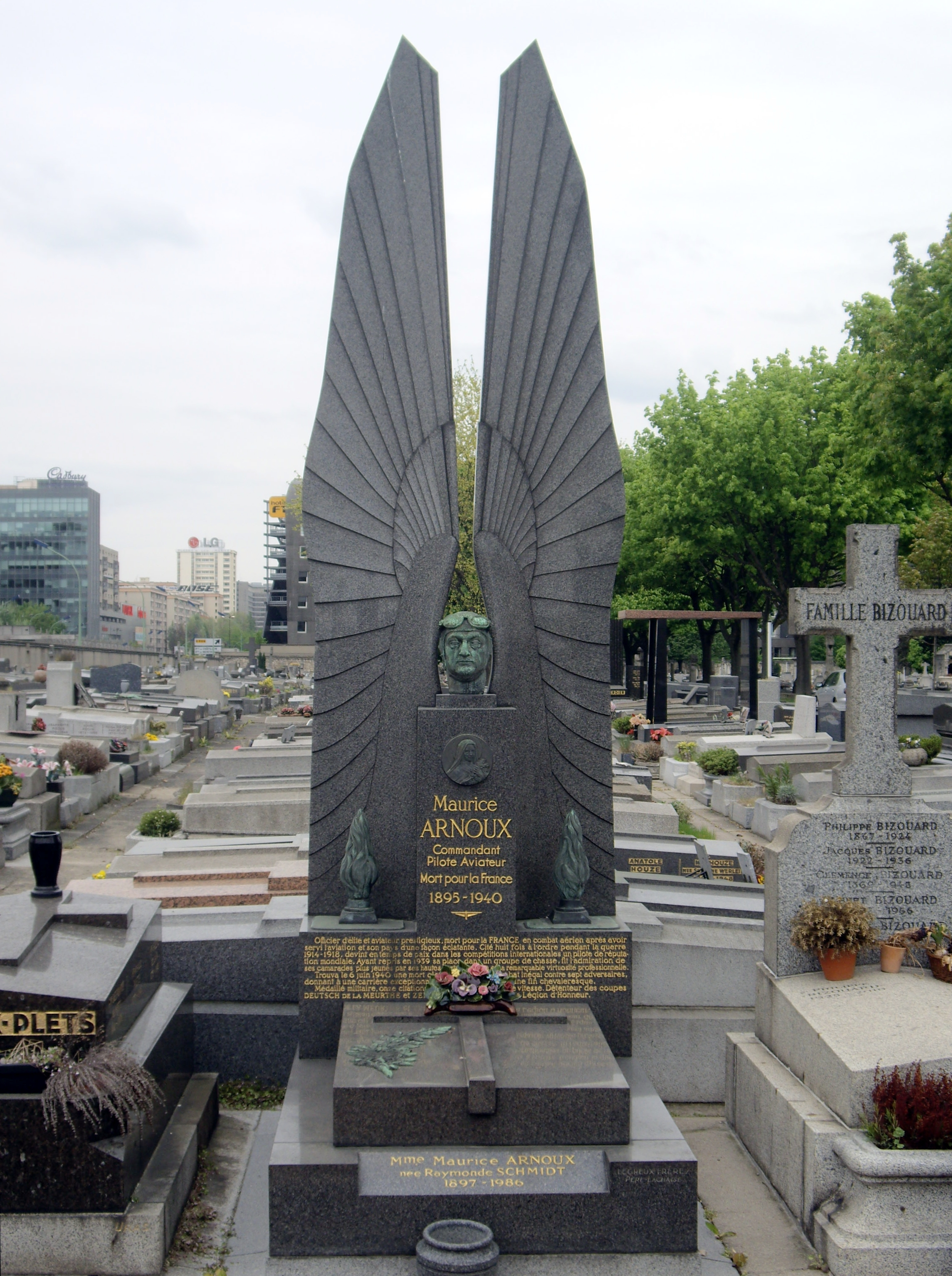
Arnoux's grave in the Cimetière de Montrouge.

In mid-July 1936 he won the Douze Heures d'Angers for the second time, completing 1,649 kilometres (1,025 mi) at an average speed of 274 km/h (170 mph), in a race cut short by bad weather. Soon after, on 25 and 26 July 1936, he competed in the third annual Grand Prix of the Aero Club of France, in which aircraft flew from Deauville to Cannes the first day, and returning the next. Arnoux won in his Caudron C.684, with an average speed of 192 mph (309 km/h), winning the cup and cash prize of 20,000 francs. In September he claimed a new world record for aircraft weighing not more than 560 kilograms (1,230 lb), flying over 1,000 kilometres (620 mi), at a speed of 248.5 mph (399.9 km/h), and in October was the co-pilot of a Caudron C.448 Goéland, one of three aircraft taking part in a French Aero Club race from Paris to Saigon and back, a distance of 14,700 miles (23,700 km), for a 1,800,000 franc (over £17,000) prize. With his co-pilot André Japy, he was in the lead, until an undercarriage failure at Karachi forced them to retire with a damaged wing.

In August 1937 he took part on the Istres–Damascus–Paris Air Race, flying as co-pilot with Paul Codos in the Breguet 470 Fulgur, and coming fifth in a race dominated by Italian Savoia-Marchetti aircraft.

On 28 December 1937, flying a Caudron-Renault aircraft Arnoux set a new altitude record for a light single-seater, reaching a height of 25,675 feet (7,826 m), and later established a new speed record, flying 100 kilometres (62 mi) at an average speed of 207.43 mph (333.83 km/h).

== Military honors ==
Besides the Croix de Guerre with six palmes and two stars, Maurice Arnoux also won two major French awards for valor:
Médaille Militaire
"Elite pilot who distinguishes himself each day by new exploits. Always prepared to accomplish all his missions with the same zeal and courage; pursuit, reconnaissance or strafing trenches. He has already downed two balloons and one aircraft and has executed missions successfully both in day and night reconnaissances of long distances without allowing himself to be impeded by enemy attacks. During the night of 17 September 1918, while on reconnaissance behind enemy lines to strafe a train station a low altitudes, he returned with his plane damaged by enemy fire. Five citations." Médaille Militaire citation, 4 October 1918

Chevalier de la Légion d'Honneur
"Remarkable officer pilot as shown by his brilliant professional qualities and by his spirit, courage and ardor beyond praise. Always volunteers for the most painful and perilous missions. After having brilliantly served in an Escadrille of reconnaissance, he transferred to pursuit aviation where he was classed among the best. Has downed five enemy planes. Cited in orders eight times." Chevalier de la Légion d'Honneur citation, 13 July 1919

== Bibliography ==
- Franks, Norman; Bailey, Frank (1993). Over the Front: The Complete Record of the Fighter Aces and Units of the United States and French Air Services, 1914–1918. London, UK: Grub Street Publishing. ISBN 978-0-948817-54-0.
