= Bellanger (automobile) =

French automobile manufacturer

Société des Automobiles Bellanger Frères
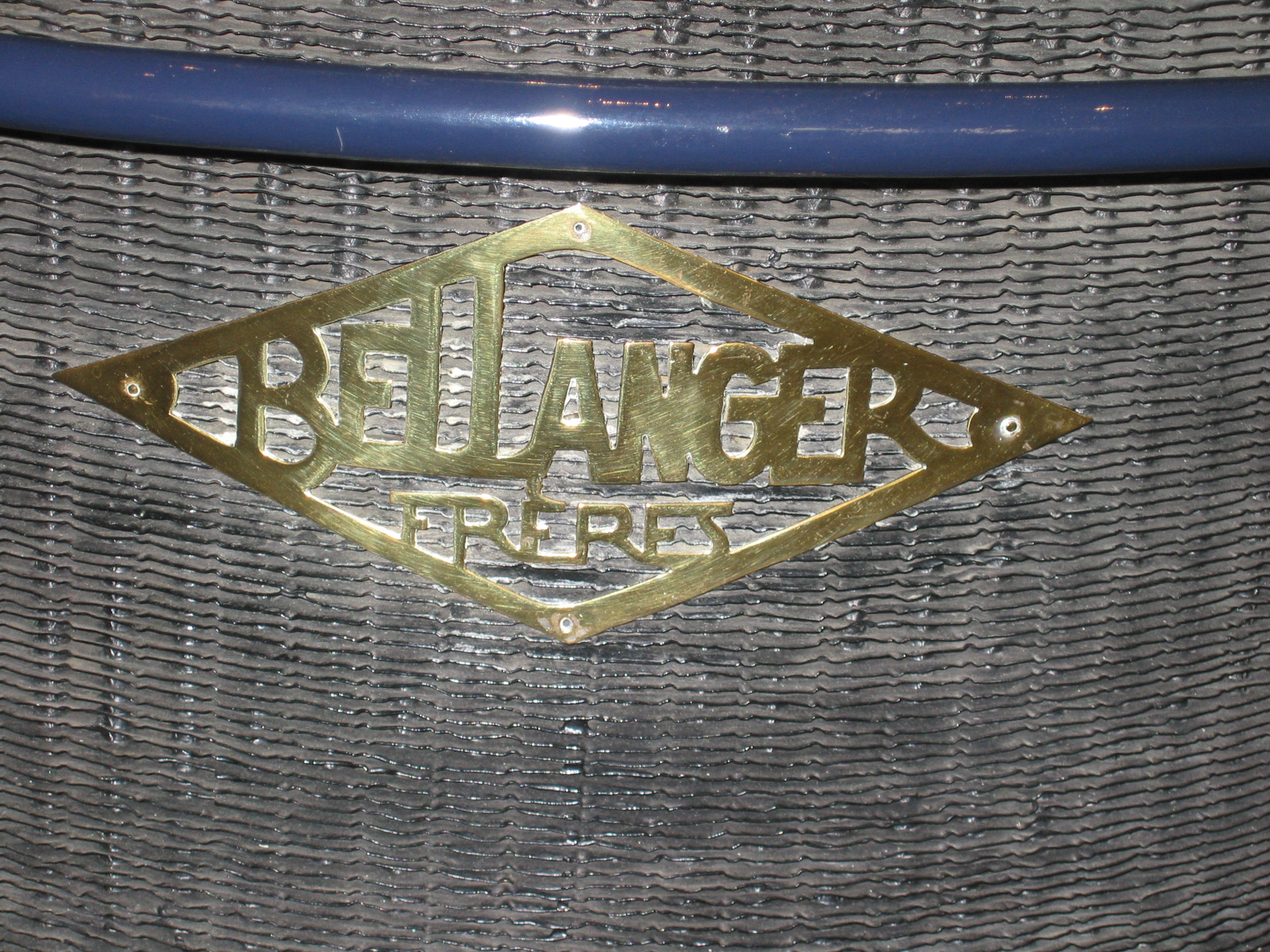
- Industry: Automotive
- Founded: 1912
- Founder: The Bellanger brothers
- Defunct: 1928
- Fate: acquired by (initially) Peugeot
- Headquarters: Neuilly-sur-Seine, France
- Products: Cars

Société des Automobiles Bellanger Frères was a French automobile manufacturer between 1912 and 1925. The cars were the brainchild of Robert Bellanger (1884-1966), who had previously sold Delaunay-Belleville vehicles.

== History of the business ==
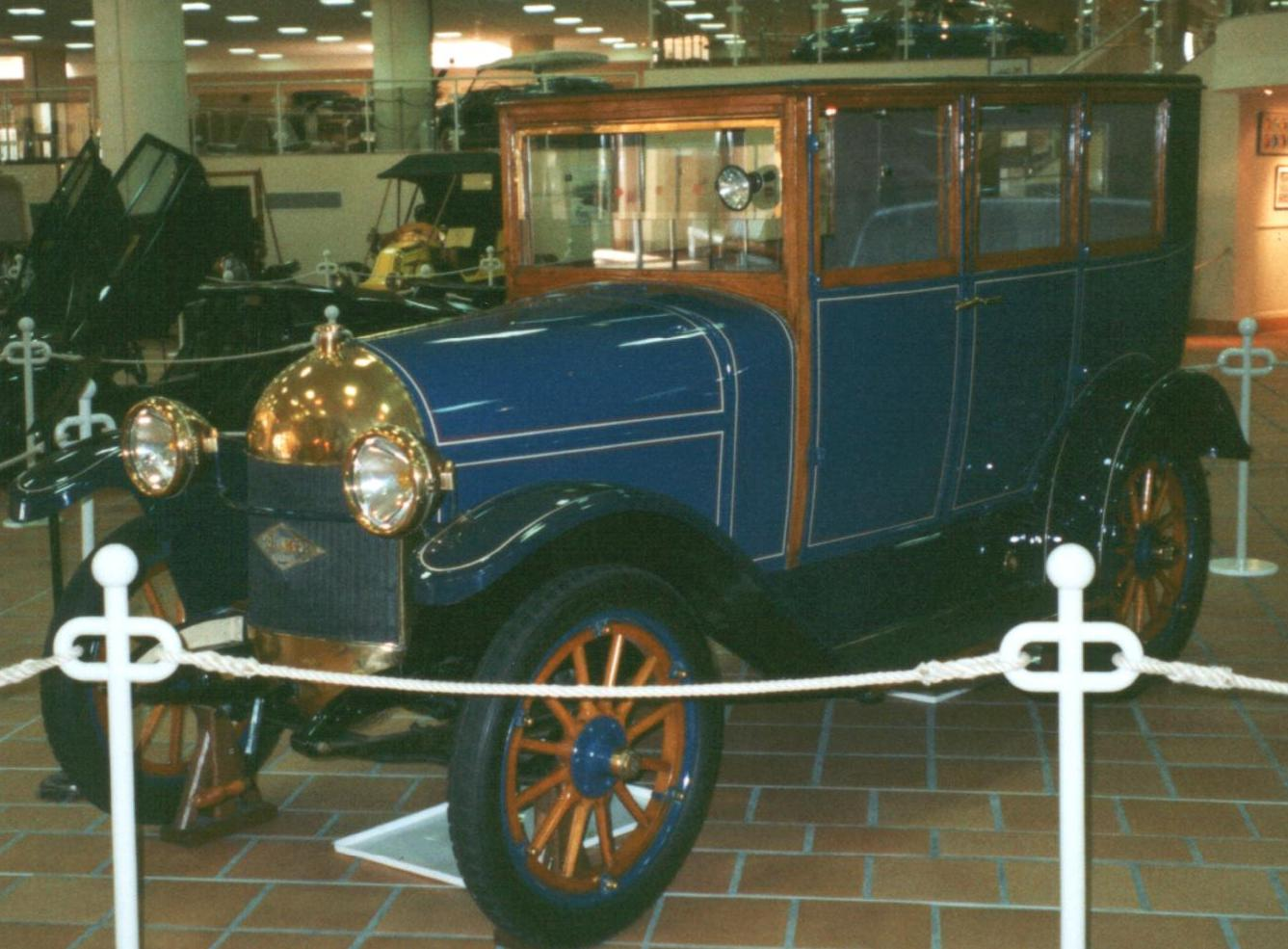
Bellanger 1921

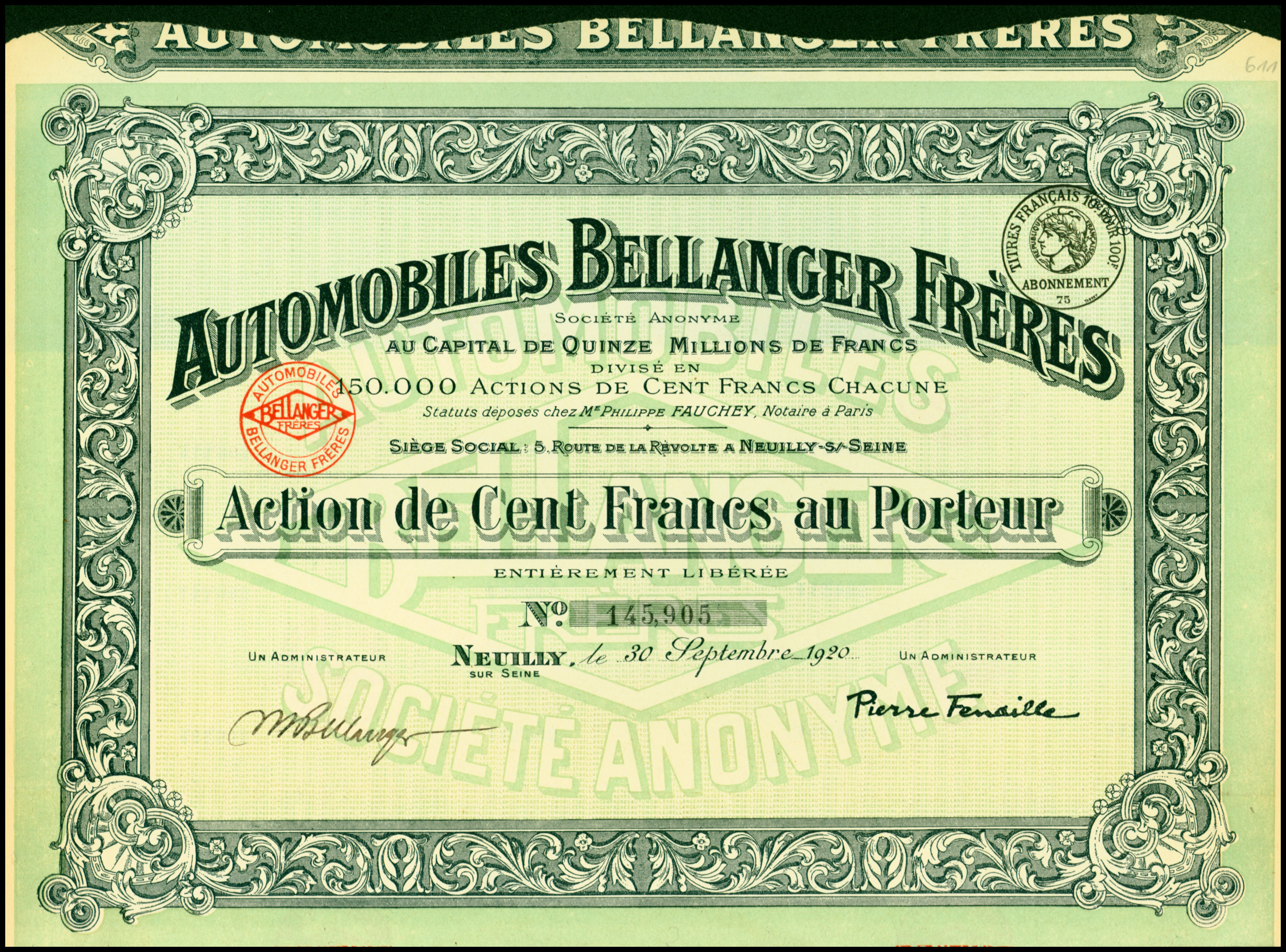
Share of the Automobiles Bellanger Frères SA, issued 30 September 1920

Robert Bellanger and his brothers founded the business in 1912 for the production of motor cars. The company was situated at Neuilly-sur-Seine on the north-western edge of Paris, in the Rue de la Révolte, today a section of the subsequently renamed Boulevard Pershing in the 17th arrondissement of Paris.

The cars were branded "Bellanger" although badges carrying the longer name "Bellanger Frères" (Bellanger Brothers) was also sometimes featured on the car badges. The Bellanger slogan was "Son capot est d'argent et son silence est d'or" - "her bonnet is silver and her silence is golden".

Robert Bellanger embarked in a career as a politician in the 1920s and the "Bellanger Frères" business was sold in 1925, one of several smaller French automakers acquired by Peugeot around this time. However, in 1928 the site was sold again, and became the property of the newly formed Automobiles L. Rosengart business and used for the production under license of the little Austin 7.

Bellanger had also started to produce aero-engines during the First World War. Despite disposing of the automotive business, Bellanger continued to produce aero-engines until 1928. The company was one of the licensed manufacturers of the Renault 12Fe (300 CV).

== The cars ==
The first cars, introduced a couple of years before the First World War, were powered by sleeve valve Daimler engines of 2000 cc, 2600 cc, 3000 cc, and 6300 cc. The smaller three options were frequently used for taxi work in Paris.

During the war the manufacturer concentrated on supplying the military.

After the war car production resumed in 1919, starting with the A1, powered by a 3.2-litre, four-cylinder, side valve engine. The A1 was designed by Valentin Laviolette, who had previously designed cars for Spyker. Bellanger had by now switched to Briscoe Frères as its engine supplier.

The manufacturer took at stand at the 15th Paris Motor Show in October 1919, and exhibited what had by now become its postwar, three-car model range:

- "Bellanger Type A1", 4-cylinder 3,170 cc (17 HP): Wheelbase 2,800 mm (110.2 in)
- "Bellanger Type D", 4-cylinder 4,240 cc (30 HP): Wheelbase 3,750 mm (147.6 in)
- "Bellanger Type F", V8-cylinder 6,340 cc (50 HP) ohv: Wheelbase 3,750 mm (147.6 in)
- "Bellanger Type B1", 4-cylinder De Dion engine type JP

The "Type F" was presented as the star of the show stand and was priced by the manufacturer accordingly at 60,000 francs in bare chassis form.

In 1928, three years after the Bellangers had sold their factory, De Dion-Bouton manufactured some of their Model JP cars with vee-radiators, and marketed them under the name "Bellanger Model B1", but this venture lasted less than a year.
