= Gabriel Cromer =

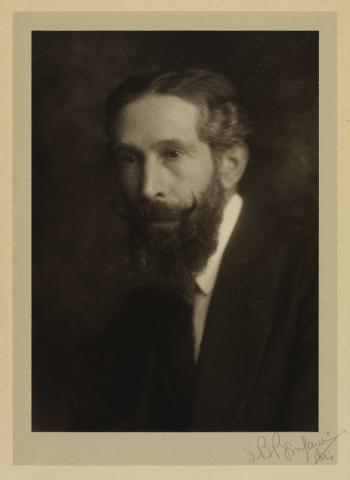
- Gabriel Cromer by J. Benson Benjamin (ca. 1920). Gelatin silver print.
- Born: Michel Alexandre Edmond Joseph Gabriel Cromer; 1 April 1873; Rethel, France
- Died: 14 November 1934 (aged 61); Clamart, France
- Resting place: Montrouge Cemetery, Paris
- Known for: Photography, collector & historian of photography
- Elected: The Société française de photographie (1912)

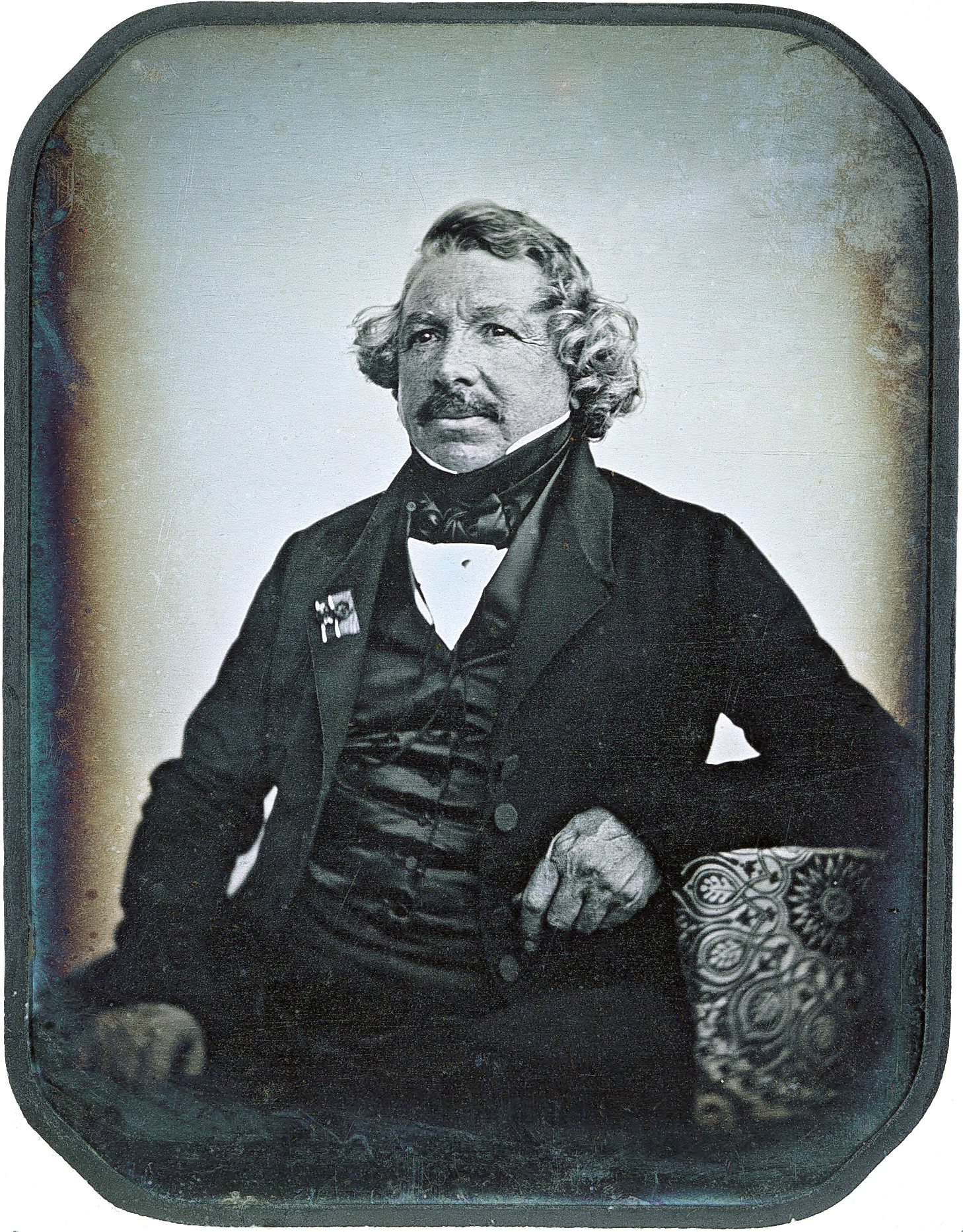
Portrait of Louis Daguerre by Jean-Baptiste Sabatier-Blot (1844) daguerreotype

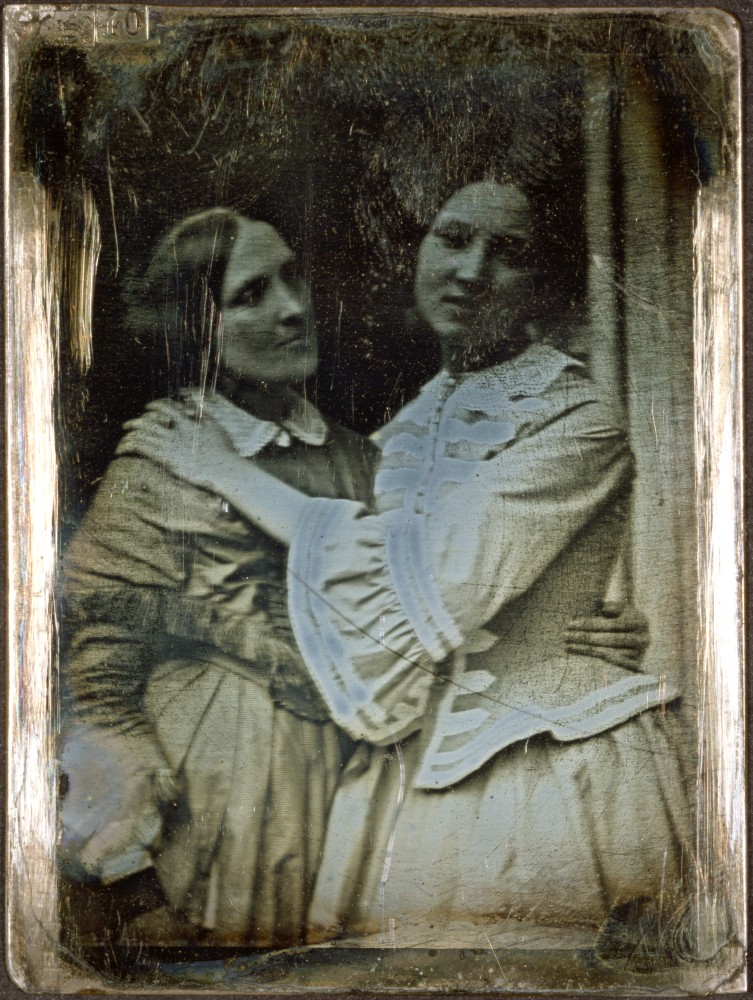
'Two women' by Cromer's Amateur (ca.1848), daguerreotype (7.2 x 5.3 cm., 1/9 plate), George Eastman House Collection

Gabriel Cromer was a photographer, a historian of photography and a collector of photographs. He was born in Rethel, in the Ardennes, France, the 1st of April 1873 and died in Clamart, in the Isle-de-France on the 14th of November 1934.

== Biography ==
Michel Alexandre Edmond Joseph Gabriel Cromer was born in Rethel on the 1st of April 1873 to a wealthy family, with jurists on his father's side and Protestant textile manufacturers on his mother's. Cromer was raised in Paris and learnt photography early on. After earning a law degree Cromer did not pursue a career in law, but instead devoted himself to photography. Around 1900, he built a villa in Clamart, a fashionable suburb of Paris, with a large photographic studio, and several laboratories. However, Cromer did not establish a professional photography business: as a person of private means, he practiced photography as an amateur.

He began collecting photographica around 1906 and became one of the 20th century's most important collectors of daguerreotypes, cameras and photographs. He built his collection both through traditional means (auctions, dealers, antiquarian bookstores), and also by establishing relationships with the descendants of family members and friends of figures such as Louis Daguerre (one of the inventors of photography) and Jean-Baptiste Sabatier-Blot (an important early practitioner of the daguerreotype process). He was an enlightened amateur photographer and scientific popularizer, organising many conferences on the history of photography. He became a member of the Société française de photographie in 1912 and became the society's librarian in 1927. On the 23rd May 1924, Gabriel Cromer delivered a lecture to the Société française de photographie devoted to the research of the French protographer, François Willème, the inventor of photosculpture. In 1928, Louis Lumière gave him a series of first attempts at autochrome plates, including a portrait of Louis taken by his brother Auguste around 1902–1905.

Gabriel Cromer wanted his collection to form the basis for a French national museum of photography. On 26 December 1924, he gave speech to the Société francaise de photographie, exhorting the group to create, or at least join him in actively advocating, for a French national museum of photography. However, the cultural authorities of the State did not appear interested. After his death in 1934 he was described as having been the future curator of the French national museum of photography. With the approach of the Second World War, the Kodak company showed interest and, in 1939, after negotiations with Cromer's widow, acquired a large part of Cromer's collection. In 1949, this acquisition was transferred to the newly formed Photographic Museum at George Eastman House. Two years earlier, in 1947, Cromer's widow had donated the remaining pieces from the collection to the National Library of France.

== 'Cromer's Amateur' ==
'Cromer's amateur' was a photographic pioneer whose identity is unknown. He is named after Gabriel Cromer, who included the unknown amateur's photographs in his collection. The hundred or so surviving daguerreotype plates date from the period 1845 to 1851. The photographs show portraits, interiors, still lifes, landscapes, street scenes and offer "[...] a rare personal look at life in Paris in the mid-19th century".

== The Cromer Collection at Georges Eastman House ==
Cromer's collection of photographica was sold to the Eastman Kodak Company in 1939, five years after Gabriel Cromer's death. It was then donated to the George Eastman House Museum, founded in 1949, which still owns the daguerreotypes made by Cromer's amateur to this day. The collection contains around 6,000 images that belonged to Gabriel Cromer, most of them preserved in albums. The collection consists of some 500 technological artifacts, 76 bound volumes of photographs, more than 500 daguerreotypes, 3000 other photographs and 125 pre-cinema objects and about 500 volumes about photography and moving images. The collection includes the portrait of Louis Daguerre, by Jean-Baptiste Sabatier-Blot, as well as works by Nadar, Étienne Carjat, Charles Marville, Gustave Le Gray, Edouard Baldus, and the Bisson Brothers and albums by Eugène Durieu, Désiré Charnay and Victor Hugo.
