= Lucien Rosengart =

French engineer

Lucien Rosengart (11 January 1881 in Paris, France – 27 July 1976) was a French engineer.

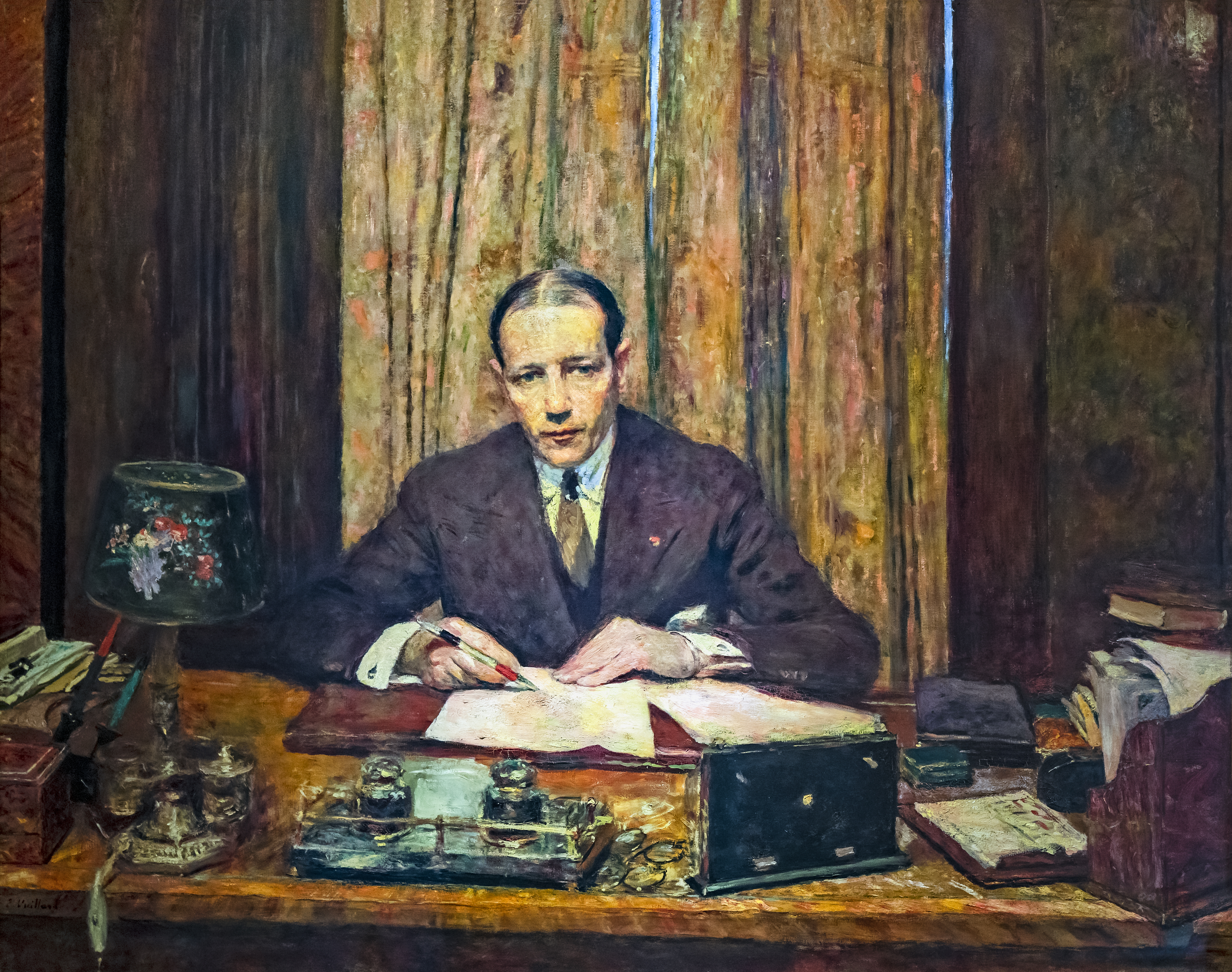
Lucien Rosengart at his work table by Édouard Vuillard

His early life was shaped by carriages and the advance of the automobile age. He first started working as a mechanic at the age of 12, and by age 24 he had a machine shop in Belleville and several patents to his credit. By 1914 his products included railway parts, bicycle parts, and a rocket that allowed artillery shells to be exploded while airborne. This attracted the attention of the French Government and they set him up with two factories, one in Paris and one in Saint-Brieuc - at this point he began working with Andre Citroën's company, which provided the shells. By the end of the first world war, he'd become a skilled businessman and helped both Peugeot and Citroën stave off bankruptcy. Involvement with these companies led Rosengart to think of building his own car. He was already making bicycles.

== Automobiles L. Rosengart ==
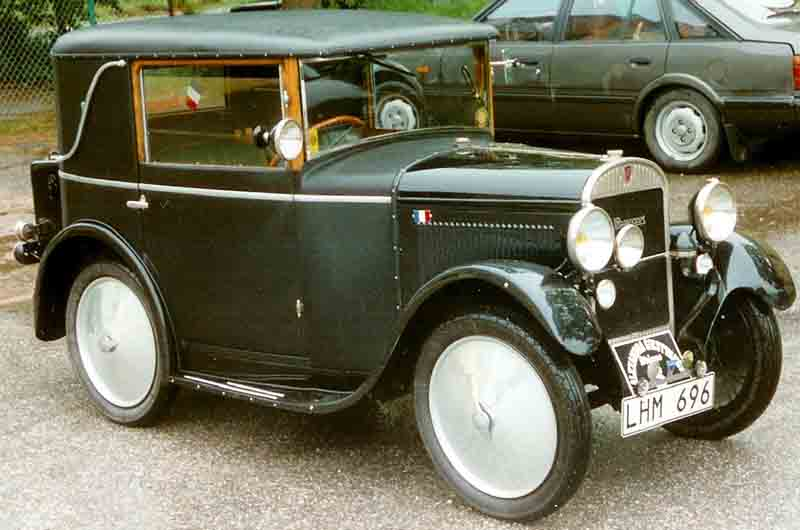
Rosengart LR4 1928

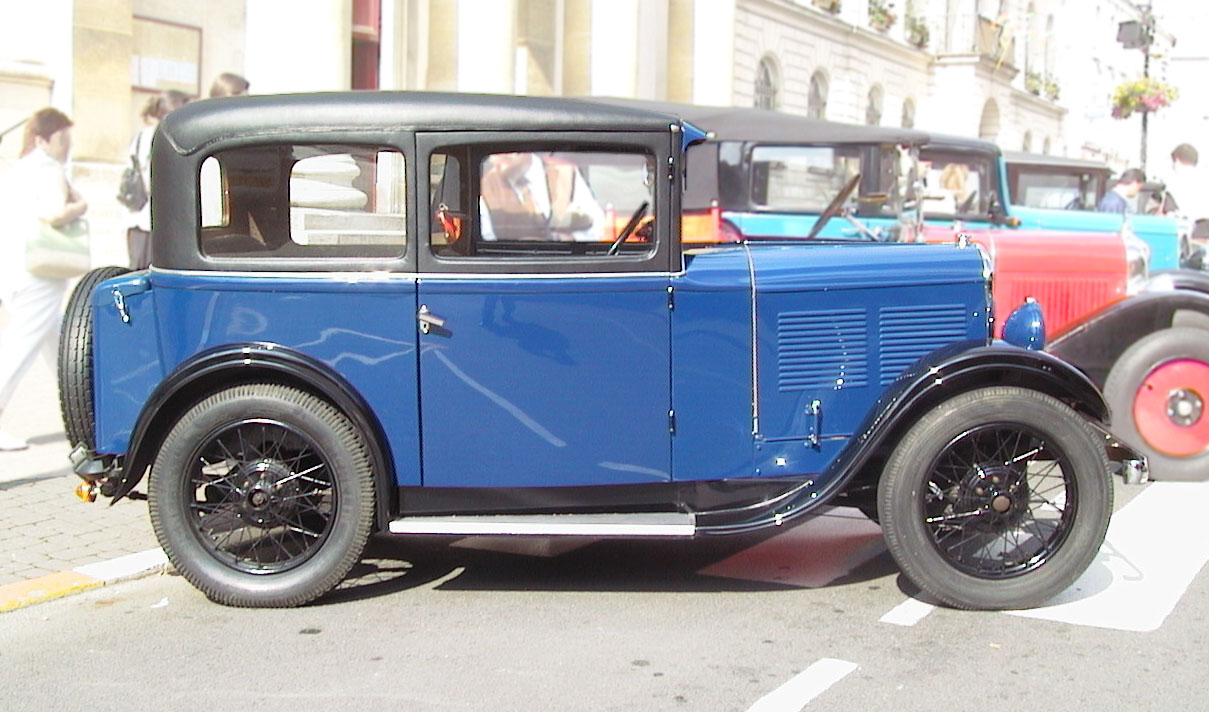
The Rosengart LR2

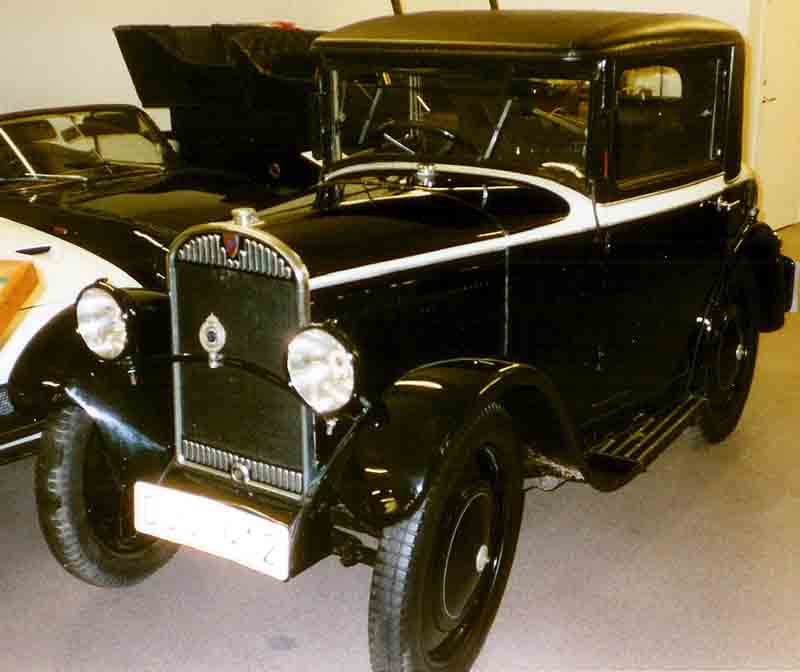
Rosengart Cabriolet 1930

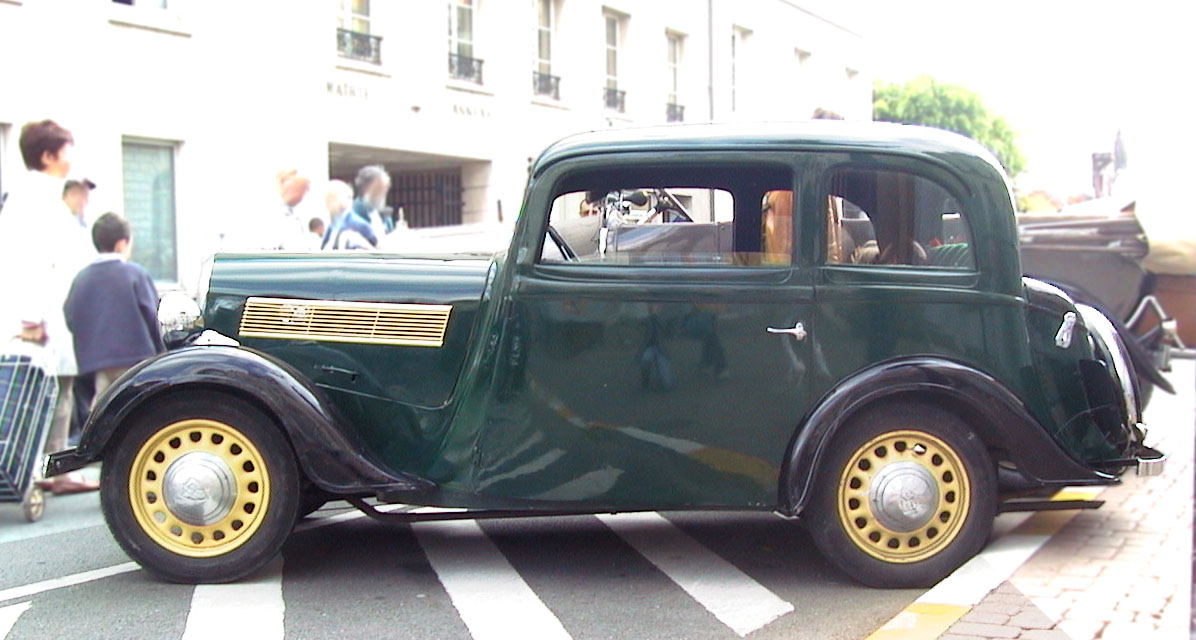
The Rosengart LR4n

In 1927, he saw the opportunity to produce a very small car for a segment of the market in France that was not at that time being covered by any of the major players. He bought the old Bellanger factory at Neuilly.

The early Rosengart cars were licensed copies of the British Austin 7. This model, the LR2, was dressed up in various ways using various styling techniques and remained in production for quite some time - surviving as the vastly facelifted LR4 and Vivor long after the British car had been consigned to history.

In the early 1930s Rosengart teamed up with the German manufacturer Adler, offering license built copies of the Adler Trumpf and Trumpf Junior, small front-drive cars that bolstered its range. It also added a conventional rear-driven car along the lines of a stretched and widened Austin. The development of front-wheel drive models led to the elegant Supertraction model in 1937 - which competed with larger cars like the Peugeot 402 and the Berliet Dauphine for the first time in Rosengart's short history.

In their November 1979 issue, Belgian magazine Le Soir Illustre (No. 2471 on page 26) claimed that Lucien Rosengart had come up with the game of table soccer in the 1930s, when he was looking for things to keep his grandchildren entertained during the cold winter months. He called the game "babyfoot" rather than foosball.

In 1936 Rosengart himself was in financial difficulties so he transferred the company to a new organisation, Societé Industrielle de l'Ouest Parisien (SIOP).

Unfortunately production of the Supertraction was never large, and the company was devastated by the Nazi invasion of France. The company was able to survive the German occupation of France until after the war but did not produce cars during the conflict. After the war Rosengart, who had been in the United States (while his son stayed in the south of France), tried to guide his company back to the small cars that had made it a success in the late 1920s and early 1930s. Unfortunately, the major manufacturers of France were by then making very small, economical cars that were very well suited to the conditions of post-war France. The last Rosengart car, the Ariette, was produced from 1947 to 1954, but failed to sell. The company closed its doors in the summer of 1955, after failing to launch its new car, the Sagaie, a development of the Ariette with a flat-twin engine.

Lucien Rosengart died at his home near Nice.

== Personal life ==
Rosengart was married to Titanic survivor Virginia Ethel Emanuel (Martin) but was widowed in 1936. They had a son, Jean-Louis Rosengart (1932-2005).
