= Victor Keppler =

American photographer (1904–1987)

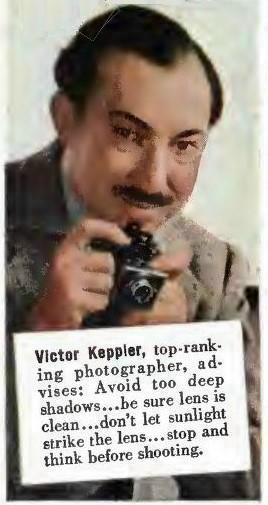
- Keppler in 1941
- Born: 1904; New York City, U.S.
- Died: December 5, 1987 (aged 82–83); New York City, U.S.
- Education: City College of New York
- Known for: Commercial photography

Victor Keppler (/ˈkɛplər/; 1904 – December 2, 1987) was an American commercial photographer and author.

== Biography ==
Keppler was born in Manhattan. He graduated from Stuyvesant High School and City College of New York.

Throughout his career as a photographer, Keppler did advertisements for clients such as Camel Cigarettes and the United States government. Keppler also did cover photos for The Saturday Evening Post.

He founded the Famous Photographers School in Westport, Connecticut, which existed from 1961 until 1972. (The Famous Photographers School was connected to the Famous Artists School.)

As a published author, Keppler wrote A Life of Color Photography: The Eighth Art (1938) and Victor Keppler: Man and Camera (1970).

== Gallery ==
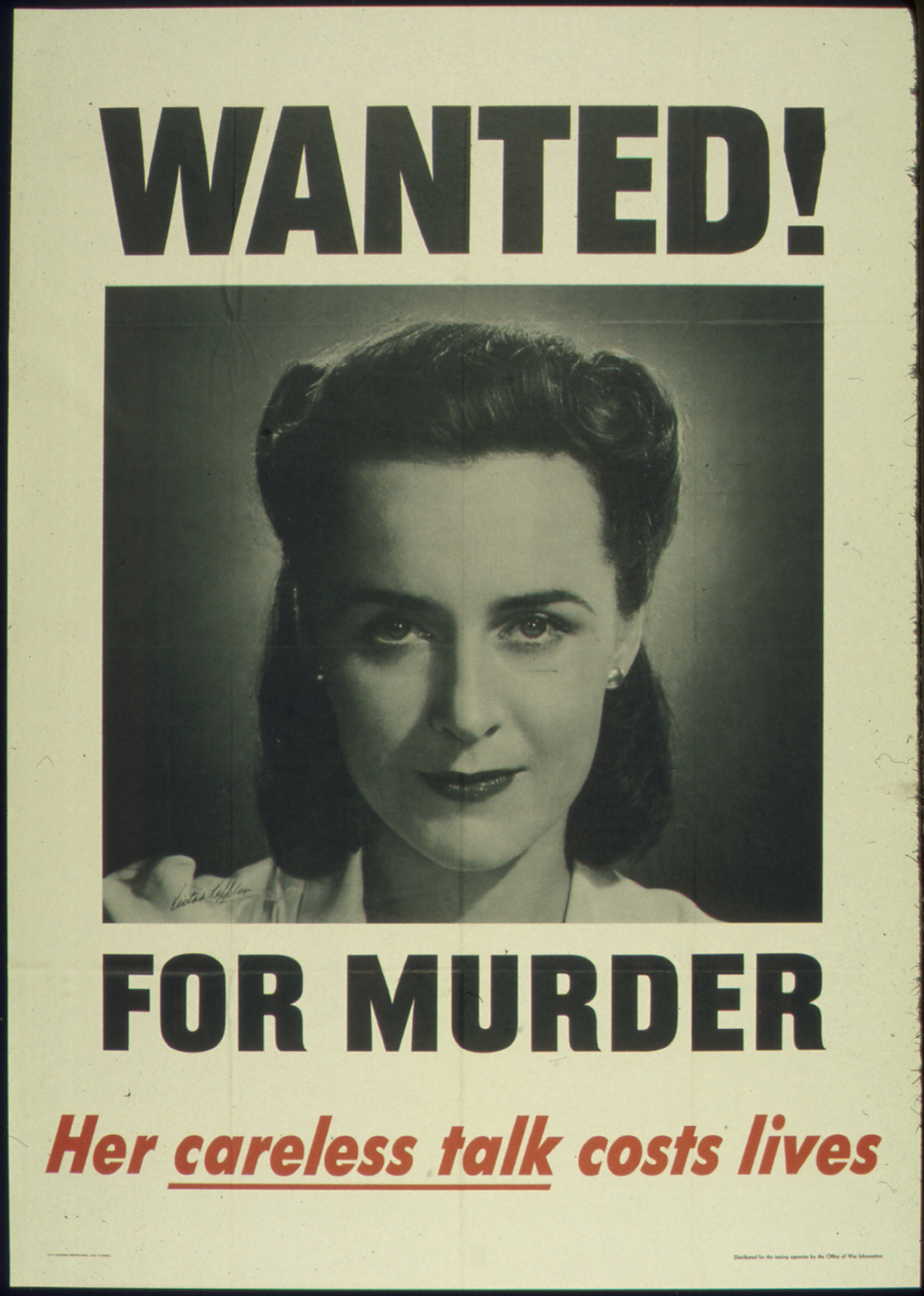
"WANTED FOR MURDER - Her careless talk costs lives"

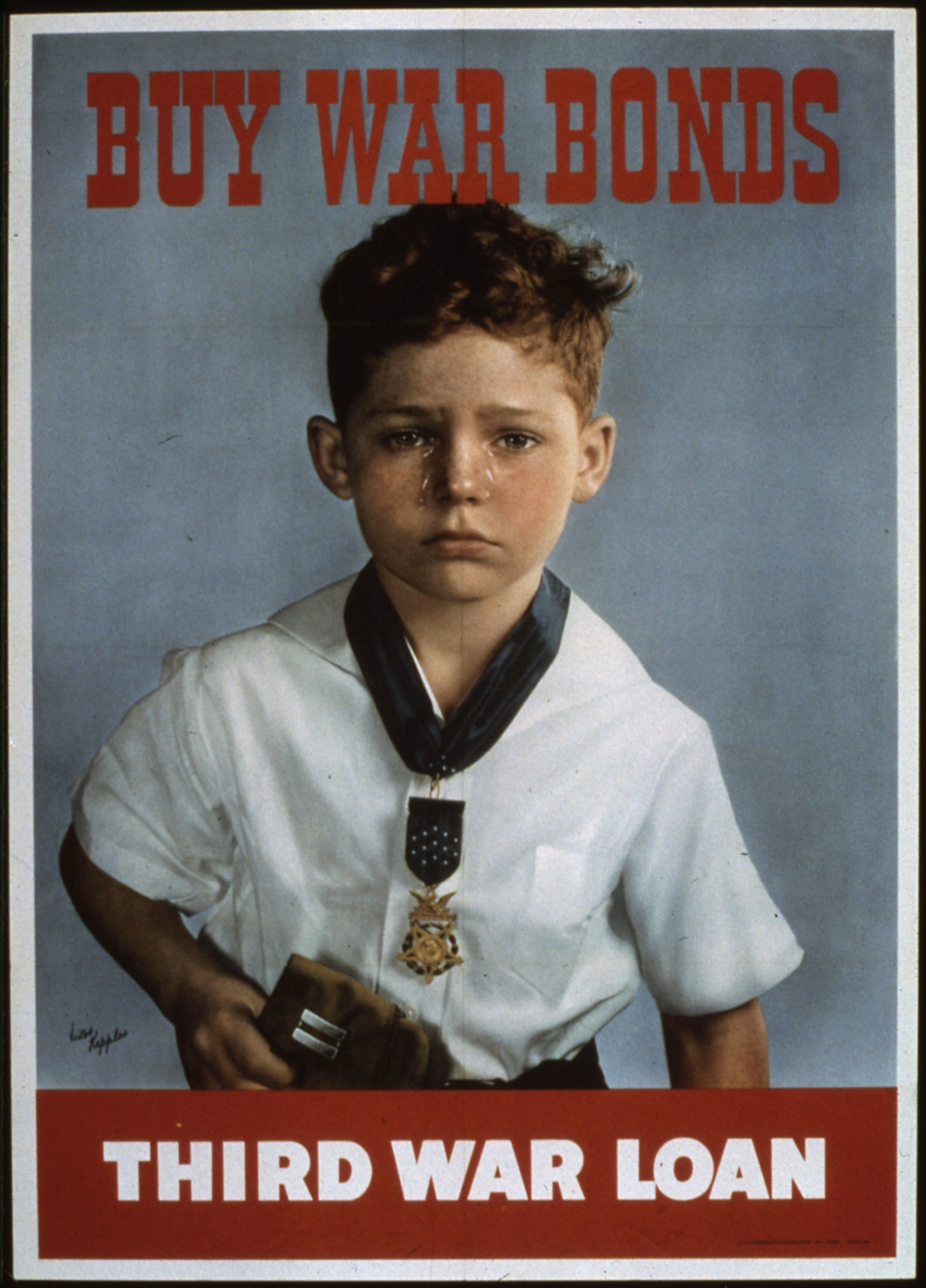
"Buy War Bonds - Third War Loan" (1943)
