= Bruce Barnes (executive) =

American banker

Bruce Barnes (born March 15, 1962, in Los Angeles) is the eighth director of the George Eastman Museum, founder of Leeds Art Foundation, and a former business executive, investment banker and investment fund executive.

== Career ==
Barnes received a B.A. in Economics magna cum laude and a Ph.D. in Economics from the University of Pennsylvania.

He started his career in mergers and acquisitions at Kidder Peabody from 1986 to 1988, and at Wasserstein Perella from 1988 to 1991. From 1992 to 1994, he was Senior Vice President and CFO of Ziff Communications Company, the holding company for Ziff-Davis Publishing; and in 1995-1996, he was an Executive Vice President of Ziff Brothers Investments. In 1997, he re-joined Wasserstein Perella as a Managing Director. From 2000 to 2004, he was Chief Executive Officer of Element K, a Rochester-based online learning company. In the hedge fund business, he served as Chief Operating Officer of Reservoir Capital Group from 2005 to 2006, and as Senior Advisor of QFS Asset Management from 2007 to 2008.

In 2005, Barnes founded Leeds Art Foundation (formerly, American Decorative Art 1900 Foundation), a private foundation that works independently and in collaboration with museums across the United States to foster the appreciation and understanding of American decorative art from the period around 1900. Since October 2012, he has been the director of the George Eastman Museum.
