= Louis Noël =

French sculptor

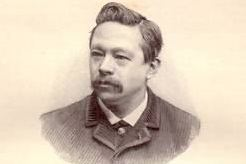
Portrait of Louis Noël.

Louis Noël (ne: Hubert Louis-Noël; Saint-Omer, April 1, 1839 - Paris, 1925) was a French sculptor. After studying at the École nationale supérieure des Beaux-Arts under François Jouffroy, Noël became a productive artist, exhibiting regularly. His busts, statues, and portraits were of historical figures, saints, and contemporary people. He created several notable portrait-medallions: Abbe Derguesse (1867; bronze), Mme L. B (1869, silver), Abbe Binet (1873, silver), President Quenson (1875), and M. B (1877). Noël was the stepfather of the sculptor Jules Déchin (1869-1947).

== Partial works ==
- Basilica of Notre-Dame de Boulogne: Statue de Monseigneur Lobbedey, Statue de sainte Ide, Statues de la Vierge et de Saint Jean
- Portrait de l'abbé d'Halluin (1896)
- Statue de Saint Pierre Fourier (1899)
- Cénotaphe (1921)
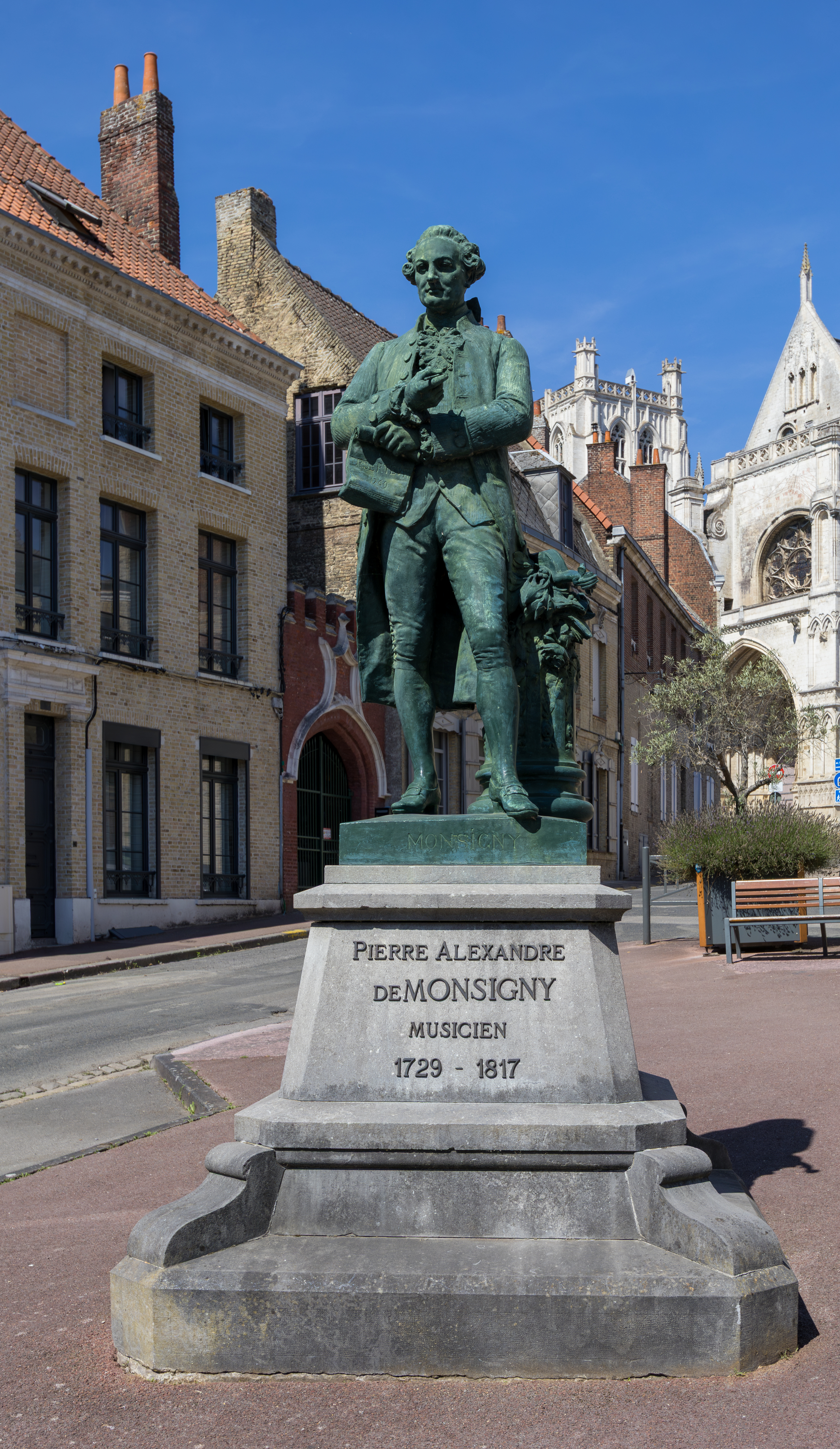
Statue of Pierre-Alexandre Monsigny in Saint-Omer

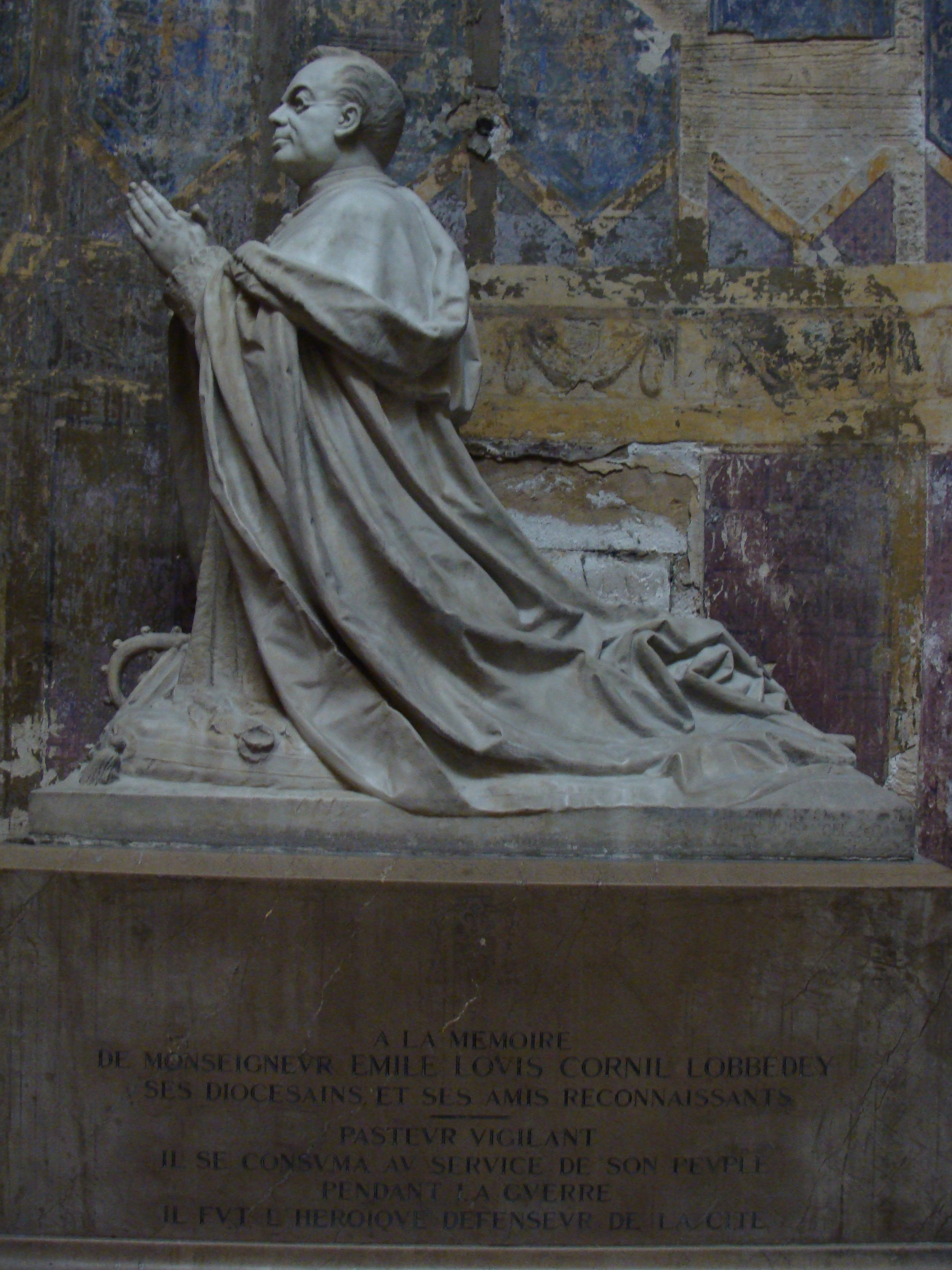
Statue of Émile-Louis-Cornil Lobbedey at the Basilica of Notre-Dame de Boulogne.
