= Berliet GD series =

Overview
- Manufacturer: Berliet
- Production: 1926–1953
- Assembly: France: Vénissieux

Body and chassis
- Layout: Front-engine, rear-wheel drive

Powertrain
- Transmission: 4-speed manual (most models)

Chronology
- Predecessor: Berliet CBA series
- Successor: Berliet GL series

The Berliet GD series is a range of medium/heavy commercial vehicles chassis produced by the French manufacturer Berliet from 1926 to 1953. It includes normal (the vast majority) and forward control designs. The GD series (with universal joints connecting the wheels and transmission) was introduced to replace the CBA and derivative models (which used chain drive) in the intermediate segment (between the lightest and heaviest segments) of Berliet rigid vehicles. The GD series had limited military use as a not-armoured transport vehicle both with purposely-made models and through requisition.

The GD series was replaced by the GL series of commercial vehicles.

== History ==
=== 1926–1934: GDH, its evolutions, and first diesels ===
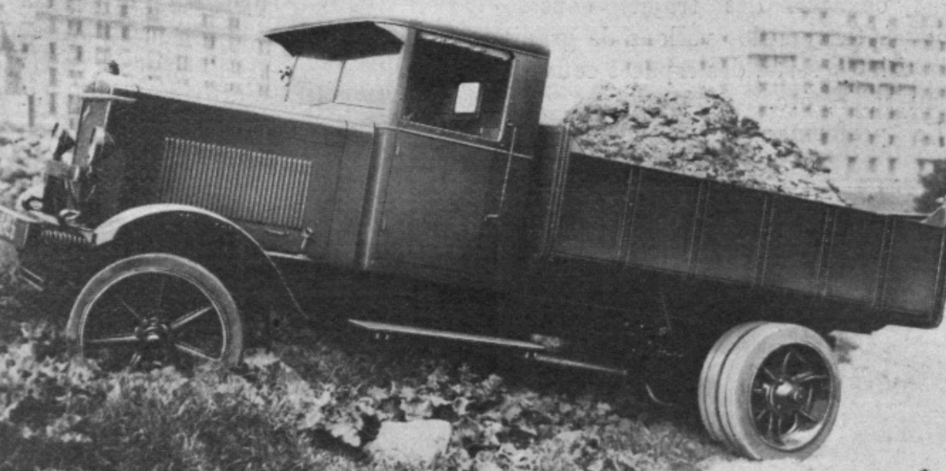
GDHE (10 tonnes payload) dumper pictured in 1931

In 1926, Berliet began the GD series of medium duty trucks, rigid lorries (designated by the G) with universal joint transmission to gradually replace the CBA series and derivatives which used chain drive transmission. The first GD series was the GDH, a commercial chassis with a 5 tonne payload and an 11 tonne gross vehicle weight (GVW). Its engine, codenamed MLB, is an inline-four petrol engine with a 110 mm bore and a 140 mm stroke, giving a displacement of 5,322 cc. It was rated at 20 fiscal horsepower (CV). The chassis was offered in two lengths and has double wheels on the rear. The French magazine La revue industrielle gives an alternative name for the GDH: CBL. In May 1927, Berliet introduced a GDH version more focussed on coach usage, the GDHV with a 10.5 tonnes GVW, using various evolutions of the MLB engine, with the same bore/stroke/displacement ratio (MLBC, MLBD, MLB5 and MLB6).

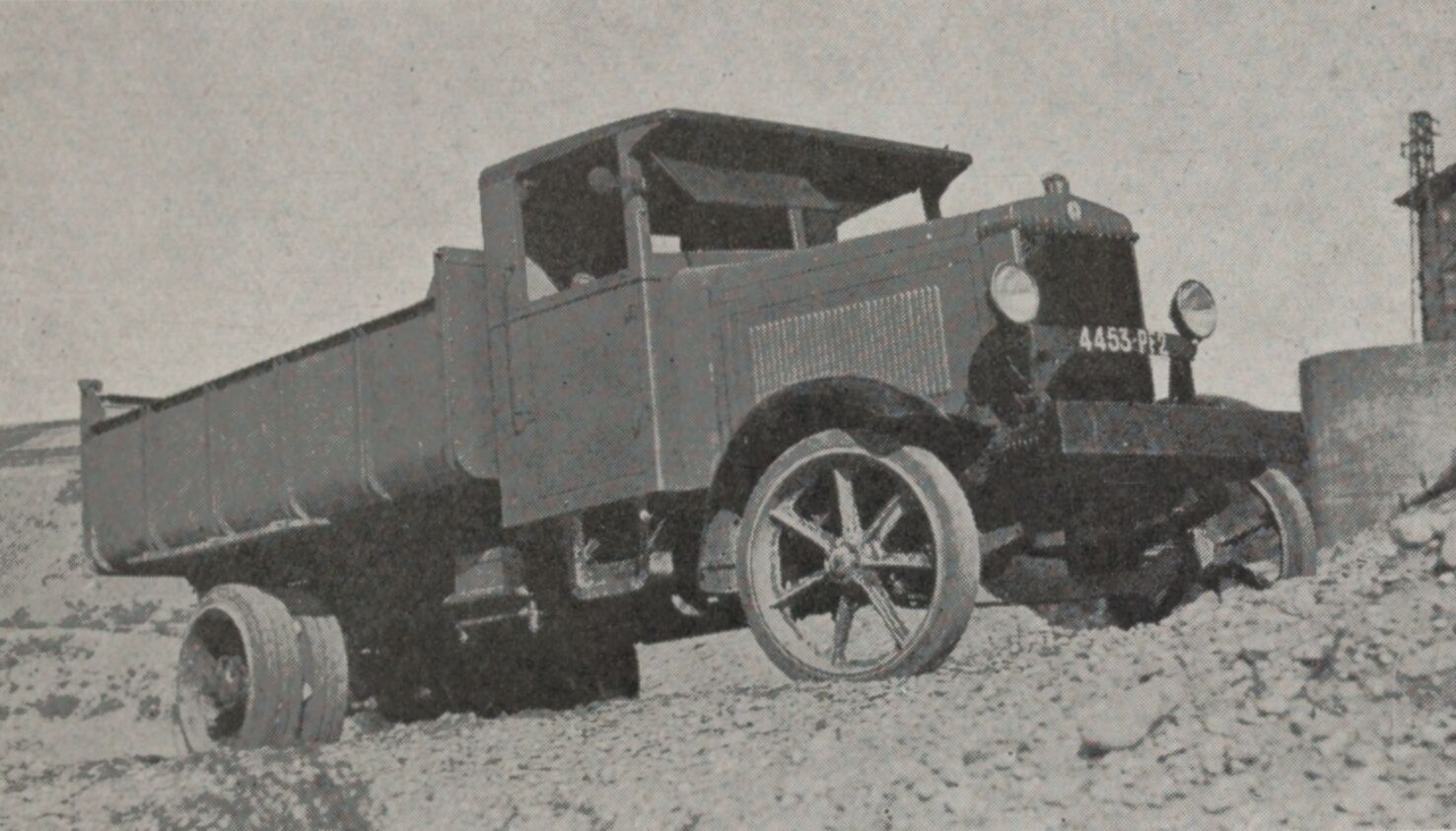
GDHMB dumper.

In November 1927, the company presented the GDHM, an evolution of the GDH with the same payload and a 12 tonnes GVW. It was initially delivered with the MLB5 engine. As was the case with its predecessor, the GDHM had two lengths, with wheelbases of either 4,250 millimetres (167 in) or 4,950 millimetres (195 in). The wheels are either solid or pneumatic and double on rear. Brakes are of two types: servomechanical actioned by a pedal (for the front wheels) and mechanical actioned by a lever (for the rears). In February 1928, Berliet launched a GDHM with reinforced chassis called the GDHMB, increasing the payload to 7.5 tonnes, 13.5 tonnes GVW. It had a version for dumpers with a derated engine, the GDHMB2. In August 1929, Berliet launched yet another GDHM derivative, the 12 tonnes GVW GDHP, basically the same chassis but with an inline-six petrol engine codenamed as MLPC3. The MLPC3 has a 125 mm bore and a 140 mm stroke giving 10,308 cc. The chassis also received a different inline-six engine with a 110 mm bore and a 140 mm stroke, being marketed in this case as GDHPB. Other derivatives followed: in 1930, the 11.5 tonnes GVW GDHL with the MLBC 110 engine, a derated MLB5; in 1931, the 17 tonnes GVW GDHE with the MLB5 as well as a gasifier-equipped GDHM and a GDHE with a more powerful MLB5 variant (MPA) marketed as GDHE 28 (the number making reference to the fiscal power). Many of the petrol-engined GDs introduced from then on would include the fiscal power in their name.

In February 1932, the GDHM received the MKU 110 engine, an inline-six petrol with a 110 mm bore and a 150 mm stroke giving 8,553 cc, and was reclassified at 6 tonnes payload and 13.5 tonnes GVW.

By 1931, Berliet began fitting diesel engines on its CBAC lorries, using Acro technology licensed from Bosch. In March 1932, various vehicles of the GD series mounted the MDB, an inline four diesel with 120 mm bore and 160 mm stroke, giving a displacement of 7,238 cc and rated at 28 CV (actual power 55 metric horsepower (40 kW) and later 70 metric horsepower (51 kW)). Those first vehicles were variants of the GDHM, GDHMB and GDHE, initially distinguished from the existing petrol variants by adding a 28 to the names (making reference to the fiscal power). By late 1932, the number alongside the letters started making reference to the engine displacement in litres, which would become common practice for diesels. The MDB-powered models were identified by a 7. Between September and October 1932, two new six cylinder diesel engines appeared: a variant of the MDB called MDE (10,857 cc, rounded to 10 litres) with a power of 100 metric horsepower (74 kW) and the MDC of 110 mm bore x 150 mm stroke (8,553 cc, rounded to 8 litres), 80 metric horsepower (59 kW). These resulted in some new models: GDHMB 8 (15 tonnes GVW), GDHM 10 (13 tonnes GVW) and GDHE 10 (16 tonnes GVW). By that time, several petrol variants with six cylinder engines were also marketed: GDHM 22, GDHM 25, GDHMB 25, GDHMB 30, GDHE 28 (again, the number indicating fiscal power).

In February 1933, Berliet introduced the GDHE 12 (16 tonnes GVW) with the MDH engine, an inline-six diesel 130 mm bore x 160 mm stroke (12,742 cc, rounded to 12 litres) with an actual power of 105 metric horsepower (77 kW). By that time, the GD series was the middle range of Berliet's commercial chassis, between the lighter V series and the heavier GP series.

Evolution of the cabin cell profiles for the normal control GD series

Various GDs shared specifications. All the diesels and most petrols generally have the same, rectangular profile cabin cell, with two doors opening from the rear side (as most vehicles today) and whose roof forms a projection acting as a sun visor above the windscreen. Only the bonnet's length, which opens like a butterfly wing as on all trucks of the time, differs depending on the type: the longer six cylinders are recognisable by their two-part bonnet sections. All GDs were delivered with 4-speed manual gearboxes, rear-wheel drive, and leaf spring suspension. By the early 1930s, servomechanical brakes on the four wheels were standard. Also by that time, the bodywork was slightly updated, with minor changes as the addition of a front bumper (early models do not have one).

From the GD series chassis Berliet started to develop tractor units as the 22 tonnes gross combined weight (GCW) TDH of 15 tonnes payload or the 28 tonnes GCW TDHE of 20 tonnes payload. (both MDE engine).

=== 1934–1939: new chassis designs, diesel expansion and gasifiers ===
For 1934, Berliet introduced the GDL, a 5 tonnes payload chassis similar to the GDHM aimed at replacing the GDHL. It was initially offered in four variants unveiled through the year: GDL 20 (10.5 tonnes GVW, MLB6 engine), GDL 22 (10.5 tonnes GVW, 22 CV four cylinder MKB engine), GDL 7 (12 tonnes GVW, MDB engine) and GDL 8 (11 tonne GVW, MDC engine). By 1934, Berliet added air brakes by French Westinghouse as an optional for GD models.

In February 1934, Berliet introduced the GDE 10 (replacing the GDHE), a chassis for construction usage, and the GDM 10 (replacing the GDHM and the GDHMB), both 15 tonnes GVW, MDE engine. In March of that year, the GDM 7 (15 tonnes GVW, MDB engine) and three chassis for construction: GDE 7 (15 tonnes GVW, MDB engine), GDE 12 (15 tonnes GVW, MDH engine) and the GDE 14. This last one was equipped with a new diesel engine, the six cylinder MDK, a longer stroke version (180 mm) of the MDH.

By May 1934, Berliet introduced two low chassis with diesels for coach usage: GDSM 7 (15 tonnes GVW, MDB engine) and GDSL 8 (13 tonnes GVW, MDC engine). At the same time, the company launched two low chassis for heavy delivery vans: GDSM/GDSE 10 (15/16.5 tonnes GVW, MDE engine) and GDSM/GDSE 12 (15/16.5 tonnes GVW, MDH engine).

In early 1935, Berliet launched the GDM 12 (15 tonnes GVW, MDH engine) and the GDM 21G (the G indicating the MKUG engine, a gasifier-equipped version of the six-cylinder MKU petrol engine). The GDMs would become the heavier tonnage GDs. In July, the GDLH 10 (12 tonnes GVW, MDE engine) and GDM (15 tonnes GVW, 25 CV MKU engine).

The Acro-based diesels had reliability problems, so, in 1935, Berliet took the Ricardo licence for diesel engines' direct injection. The previous French licensor, Citroën, had dropped it because of technical and financial difficulties. The Ricardo technology was tested on a MDK engine with three combustion chamber systems: Whirpool, Comet II and Comet III. The Ricardo-based engines had the same failures. The problem only was fixed when Berliet made changes to the cylinder heads.

In 1936, Berliet presented the first chassis powered with Ricardo's technology, the GDLR 7 of just over 12 tonnes GVW. The GDLR 7's engine was named as MDBR (R for Ricardo), an inline four diesel with 120 mm bore and 160 mm stroke, giving a displacement of 7,238 cc and rated at 28 CV. The company also unveiled a similar Acro type chassis alongside it, the GDLB 7 (MDB engine). That same year, the company launched an 11 tonne GVW version of the GDL called GDB 22, powered by the MKU 3, a 22 CV inline four petrol 110 mm bore x 155 mm stroke (5,892 cc). The GDL 10 (12 tonnes GVW, MDE engine) was added. The GDR 22 (5892 cc MKB 3 engine) replaced the GDL 22 (the GDRs would start to replace the GDLs in the lower tonnage GD series).

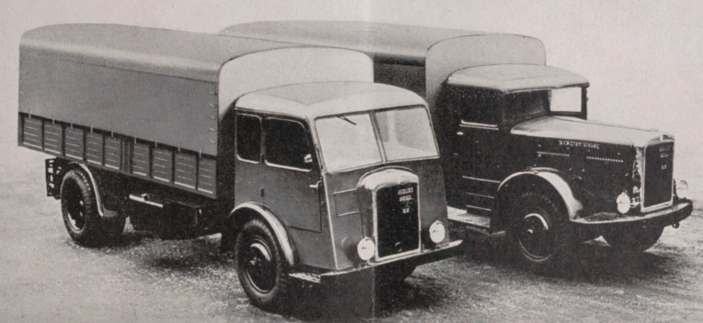
Two 7.5 tonnes payload chassis for 1937. The one at the front is a GDMK, first styling forward control cabin, and the one in the background is a GDM, first styling (transitional) normal cabin.

In mid-1936, Berliet launched the GDLK 7, the first Berliet with a modern, proper forward control cabin (the "K" signalling it). The chassis was first with an MDB engine and later with an MDBR. This initial GD series forward control cabin design adopted features that gradually were introduced and became standard in the normal control cabins between 1936 and 1937 and were so for them until they left production: removal of the "sun visor", doors opened from the front side, chromed grille frame (this was already present in some models), trapezium-like instead of rectangular side profile for the cabin cell. Later that year, Berliet put on sale two other models using the same forward control cabin: GDRK 22 (over 10 tonnes GVW, MKB 3 engine) and GDMK 10 (over 15 tonnes GVW, MDE engine).

In late 1936, at that year's Paris Salon, Berliet unveiled the GDLR 8 chassis with the MDCW engine. The MDCW was a MDC using Ricardo's Whirpool system. The same engine was later offered as MDC 2 C (Comet II system) and MDC 3 C (Comet III). At the same Salon, Berliet also presented the GDR 7 (MDBR engine). This new chassis was offered in two lengths: normal (10.8 tonnes GVW) and long (11 tonne GVW). The GDR 7 would become the most popular civil model of the GD series before World War II. Finally, there was the forward control GDSL (13 tonnes GVW), a low chassis mainly for coach/bus usage, with two versions: GDSL 30 (MKU 110 petrol engine) and GDSL 8 (initially, MDCW diesel engine). The GDSL initially had a single seat cabin similar to the contemporary Renault ZP. Also in that year, the company launched the GDM 8, a chassis with a GVW of either 15.6 tonnes (normal) or 15.8 tonnes (long), powered by the MDCW and later by the MDC 2 C. The GDM 8 was the heaviest four-wheeler Berliet in 1936. There was another two forward control models: GDMK 7 R (over 15 tonnes GVW, MDBR engine of second generation or MDB 2R) and GDRK 7 (about 11 tonne GVW, MDBR engine).

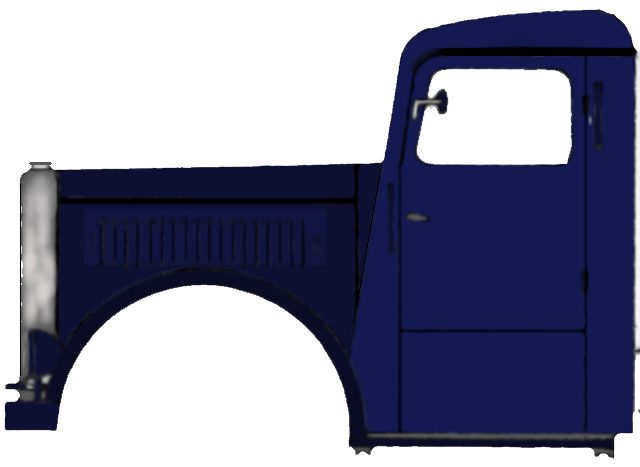
Cabin for normal control, four cylinder GD series in the late 1930s. The basic design (second styling) would be kept until the end of the series. The chromed grille would mostly disappear of the military vehicles in the late 1930s (replaced by camouflage patterns) and of the civilian ones in the mid-1940s.

In 1937, the models were the GDSL 7 (11.5 tonnes GVW, MDBR engine of second generation), and the gasifier-equipped GDMG 2 (16.5 tonnes GVW, MKUG engine) as well as two forward control reinforced chassis versions of the GDL and the GDR respectively: the GDRKL 7 (14.5 tonnes GVW, MDBR of third generation or MDB 3R) and the gasifier-equipped GDRKLG (15 tonnes GVW), powered by the MPB 2 G, a gasifier-ready derivative of the MDB engine. By this time the forward control cabin of the GD series was modernised, with more rounded lines and a more integrated grille while the normal control ones kept the previously described design. By the end of the year, it appeared another forward control chassis (GDLK 8) and a heavier GDR 7 (GDRC 7). In 1938, the company launched gasifier-equipped chassis: GDL 21G, GDLCG 21, GDR 21G (all powered by the MKUG). It presented the GDME 7 (16.5 tonnes GVW, MDBR engine of third generation) and the GDR 8 (about 11 tonne GVW, MDC 3 C engine). The company also made changes to various chassis, mostly increasing GVW. Those chassis added the sufix .38.

The last new civil models before World War II were the GDME 10 (16.5 tonnes GVW and MDER engine, an MDE with Ricardo technology), a GDM 8 replacement, and the GDMG 10 (16.5 tonnes GVW and MPEG engine, a gasifier-running variant of the MDE). In 1941, three GDME 10 were used to test peanut oil and palm oil produced in the colonies as an alternative fuel by a trans-Saharan travel.

==== Military GDs before the war ====
An early military GDR 22 with the first (transitional) styling. The later tanker models would be delivered with the second styling.

GD series chassis were delivered at the time to the French military service, sometimes even before they were in the civil market: these include a GDL (October 1933), various GDRs of mostly long chassis (late 1936–early 1937), a GDM (March 1937), various GDR 22 (late 1936–late 1938), a GDLR 7 (December 1937), some GDR 7 long chassis (September 1938), some GDSL (March 1939), some GDMK (June 1939), various GDLS 30 (July 1939), some gasifier-equipped GDRs (August 1939).

The GDR 22 was the most common military GD series in the years leading to World War II. The military version was initially delivered with a tarpaulin covering the cargo area. The wheelbase of this version is 4,810 millimetres (189 in), the width 2,350 millimetres (93 in), the height 2,790 millimetres (110 in), the length 7,230 millimetres (285 in), the kerb weight 5,530 kilograms (12,190 lb). This version was delivered to the French Army and the French Air Force. Later versions (1938 onwards) were delivered to the French Air Force as tankers with a wheelbase of 4,460 millimetres (176 in), width 2,490 millimetres (98 in), height 2,450 millimetres (96 in), length 6,763 millimetres (266.3 in), kerb weight 6,350 kilograms (14,000 lb). Both versions have a 5 tonne payload and the same MKB 3 engine as the civil version. It has a maximum power of 75 metric horsepower (55 kW) at 2,000 rpm. The GDR 7 was delivered with the same wheelbases, initially the long wheelbase with tarpaulin (1938) and, after the war started, the shorter normal wheelbase as a tanker. The tanker version has a length of 6,900 millimetres (270 in). The MDBR engine in military configuration had a power of 80 metric horsepower (59 kW).

The forward control, low chassis GDLS 30 (15 tonnes GVW) was already developed as a primarily military vehicle in view of the upcoming war for hauling the 75 CA 1932 anti-aircraft gun on road. The larger size compared to other mid-range haulers of the time responds to guidelines of a 1933 re-armament programme, requiring to transport under cover the entire gun crew (20 men) and an initial supply of ammunition. The speed of the GDLS 30, with a top limit of 56 kilometres per hour (35 mph), is in accordance with the piece to be towed, which can withstand an average of 40 kilometres per hour (25 mph) without damage. The wheelbase of this version is 3,600 millimetres (140 in), the width 2,590 millimetres (102 in), the length 7,160 millimetres (282 in), the kerb weight 7,650 kilograms (16,870 lb). The engine is an MKU 110 with a maximum power of 90 metric horsepower (66 kW) in military configuration. Orders for the vehicle continued after the war broke out. Some civil GDLS 30s were requisitioned and turned into refrigerated lorries.

=== 1939–1945: World War II and aftermath ===
After the war started, many civilian GDs were requisitioned. Berliet produced mainly two GD series model for the military, the GDLS 30 and the GDRA. The 10.85 tonnes GVW GDRA (A for armée) was a variant of the GDR type conceived from the start to be a military vehicle. The wheelbase of the GDRA was 4,860 millimetres (191 in), the width 2,475 millimetres (97.4 in), height 2,790 millimetres (110 in), the length 7,580 millimetres (298 in), the kerb weight 5,500 kilograms (12,100 lb). Its engine was the MPF, an inline four petrol of 110 mm bore x 150 mm stroke (5,702 cc) with a maximum power of 70 metric horsepower (51 kW) in military configuration. It may have had horizontal slits on the bonnet instead of the vertical slits common to the rest of the GD series vehicle range, according to military diagrams, but it is not clear as no GDRA survived. The GDRA was the first Berliet vehicle produced in an industrial scale since 1918. 1,880 GDRAs (bodywork with tarpaulin cover, tipper and tanker) were produced until the armistice. By comparison, the most produced GD series model in the interwar period was the GDR 7 of which 1,182 were built between 1936 and 1939 (including military versions and the forward control GDRK 7).

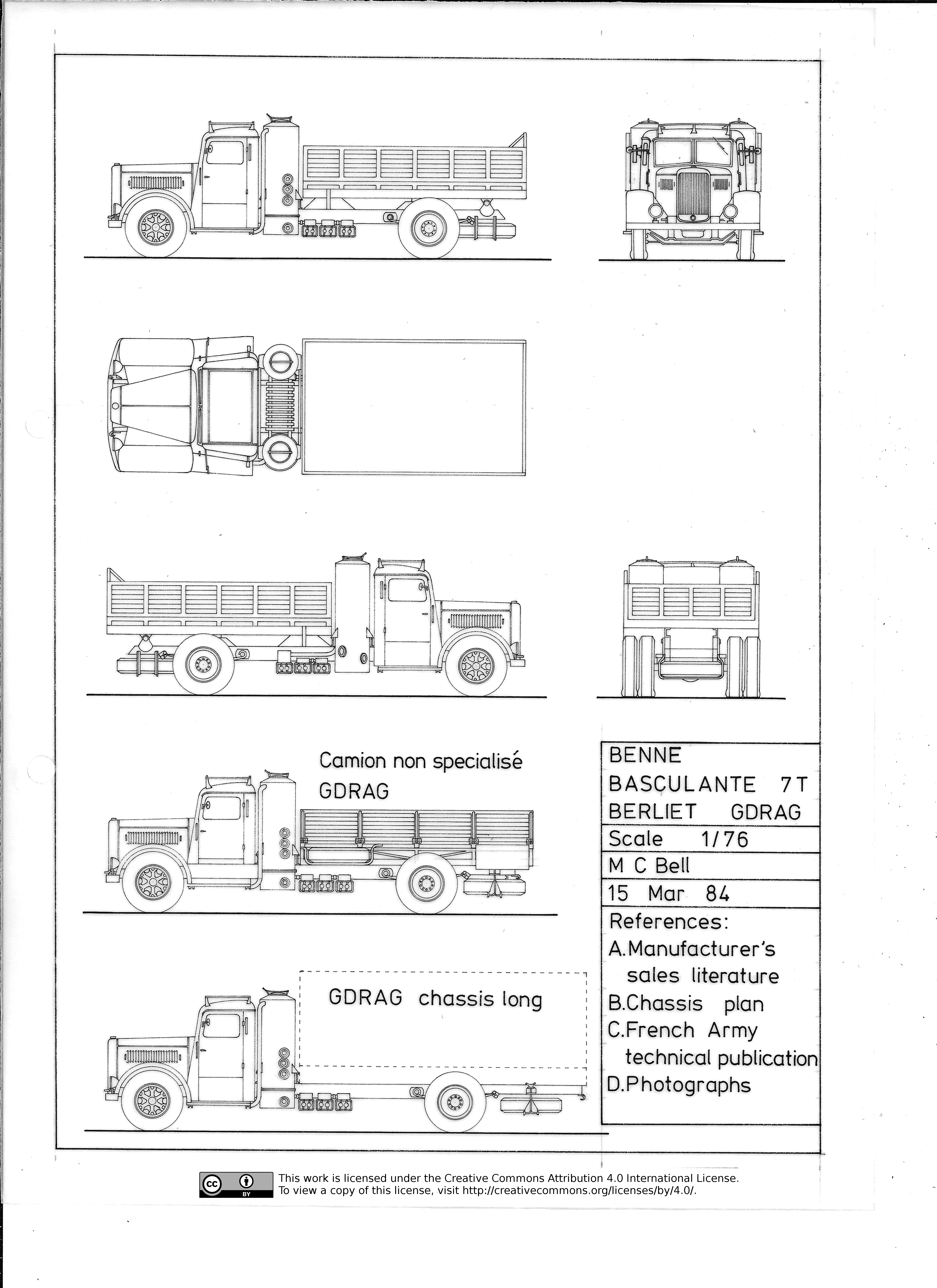
GDRAG diagram, showing the gasifier behind the cabin

After the armistice, Berliet produced a civil version of the GDRA with gasifier, the 12 tonnes GVW GDRA 19G (later renamed as GDRAG). Its engine was the MPBG (a gasifier-running derivative of the diesel MBD) with a maximum power of 60 metric horsepower (44 kW), later replaced by the similar MPB 3G with the same power.

From 1941, Berliet delivered some military vehicles: 127 of the GDRA 7, a diesel version of the GDRA for colonies with an MDB 3R engine, maximum power of 85 metric horsepower (63 kW); 80 of the GDRA 2, a variant of the GDRA with some GDRAG components; 2,405 of the GDRA 28 W. The last GDRA variant listed was produced from July 1941 to the end of the Occupation. The 28 in the name of this variant makes reference to the fiscal horsepower (as other petrols) and the W probably to the Wehrmacht to which it was exclusively delivered. It was powered by the MPB 3 engine, an inline four petrol of 120 mm bore x 160 mm stroke (7,238 cc), later replaced by the similar MPB 4. Both had a power of 80 metric horsepower (59 kW). Some further production of the model was as a gasifier-equipped lorry called GDRAG 28 (10.9 tonnes GVW, MPBG engine) and as an obscure model called GDRA 28 TTN, an all-purpose truck. The GDRA 28 TTN was powered by an engine similar to the GDRA 28 W but with 85 metric horsepower (63 kW). It was delivered to the Armistice Army, with a production total estimated by Berliet at about 80 units.

For the French civilian market, Berliet continued producing the GDRAG. In 1943, upon request of the German leadership, the lorries of this type adopted the Imbert technology for their gasifiers, as it was favoured by it. These Imbert models adopted the name GDRIG. From January 1944, it also produced the GDRKLG, a gasifier-equipped hybrid vehicle with the cabin cell of a pre-war GDRK on a GDLS 30 chassis. Later that year, another forward control chassis, the GDSLG, a gasifier-equipped variant of the pre-war GDSL coach/bus chassis. The last two vehicles listed were powered by the MPB 2G, an evolution of the MPBG with a power of 65 metric horsepower (48 kW).

As a strategic industrial site for the German war effort, from early 1944 onwards the Berliet plant was bombed in various opportunities by the AAF. On 2 May 1944, the bombing was so intense that it stopped assembly operations almost completely. Production in full resumed by September, after the Liberation, the first vehicle being a GDRAG. The GDRA 28 W was renamed as GDR 28 F and reclassified as 6 tonnes payload, 12 (later 12.6) tonnes GVW.

The GDRAG (counting also its sister vehicles GDRA 19G, GDRIG and GDRAG 28) was the most produced gasifier-equipped Berliet in history, with 3,699 units. By July 1945, Berliet launched the GDRKL 7, a short-lived diesel version of the GDRKLG with an MDB 3R engine.

=== 1945–1952: post-war and end of the GD series ===
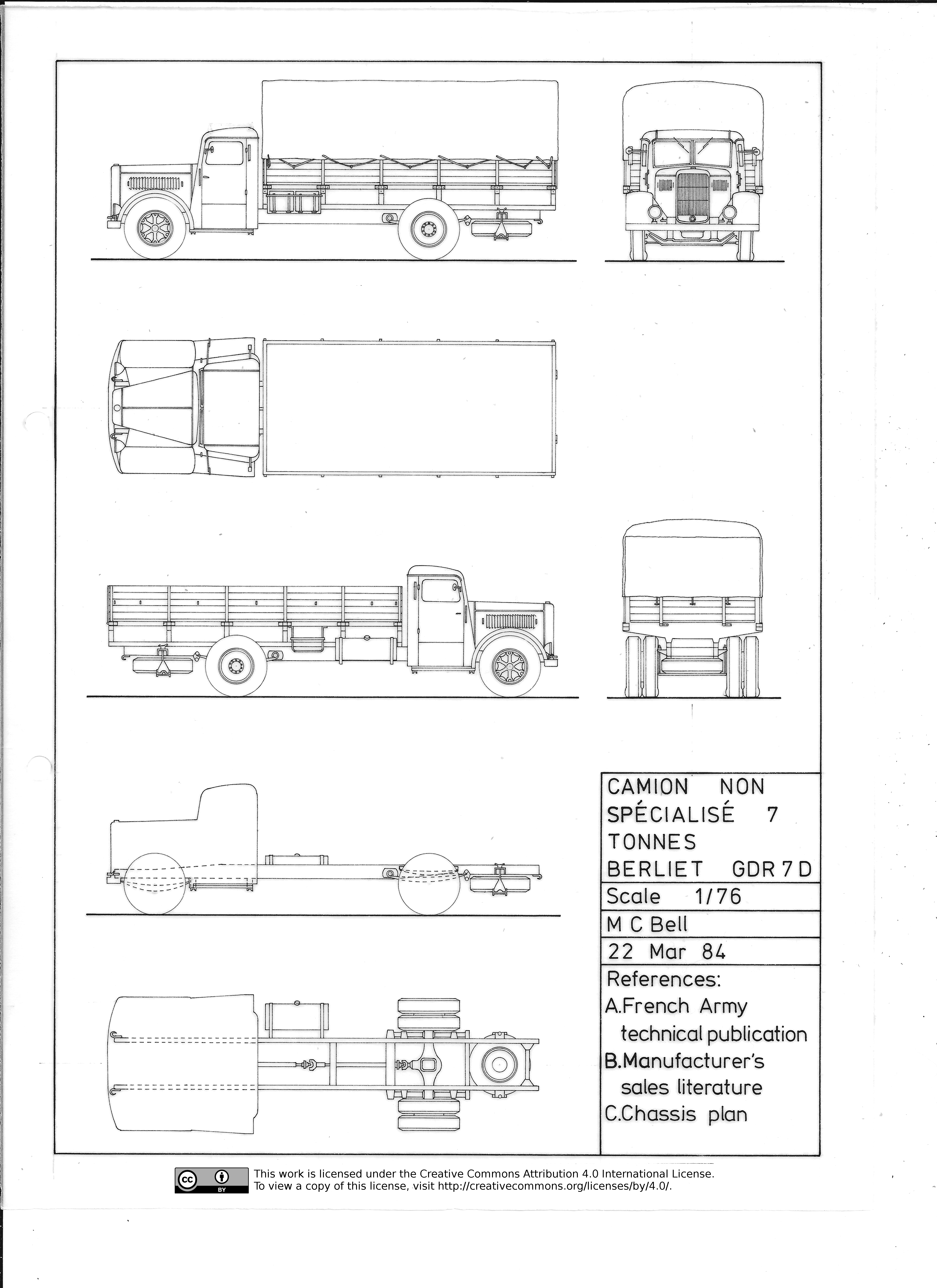
GDR 7 D diagram

In November 1945, Berliet launched the GDR 7 D, basically a diesel version of the GDRAG aimed at replacing it. It has a wheelbase of either 4,250 millimetres (167 in) (normal and tipper chassis) or 4,835 millimetres (190.4 in) (long chassis). The width is 2,375 millimetres (93.5 in) for all versions. The length (with rear bodywork) can be 6,640 millimetres (261 in) (tipper), 6,793 millimetres (267.4 in) (normal), 7,786 millimetres (306.5 in) (long). Chassis weight is 4,200 kilograms (9,300 lb), the payload is 7 tonnes with 13 tonnes GVW. The engine used by the GDR 7 D is the MDB 3R rated at 19 CV and with a maximum actual power of 85 metric horsepower (63 kW) at 1,650 rpm. The GDR 7 D was tested by the French Army for Saharan routes. It was also requisitioned to be used in Algeria.

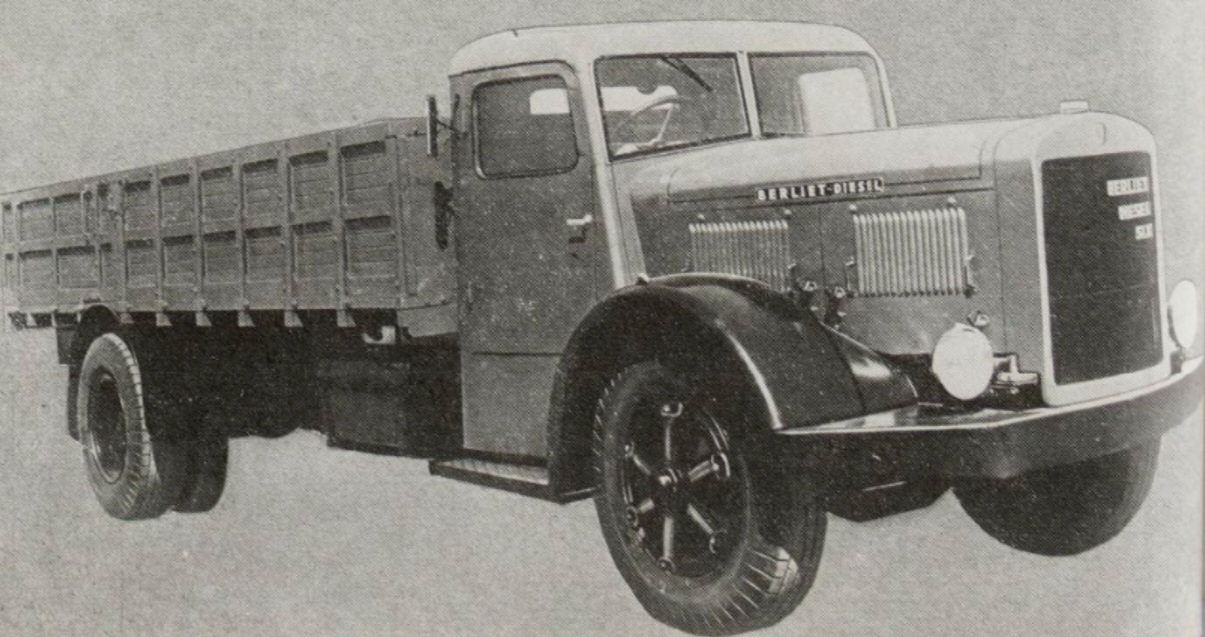
This picture shows an early design GDME 10.46, with a two-part bonnet section as in the pre-war design. Later models would use a single bonnet cover by each side as the four cylinders.

In September 1946, the company introduced the GDME 10.46, a re-using of the pre-war GDME 10 chassis with some modifications to comply with changes in French regulations. It has a wheelbase of either 5,000 millimetres (200 in) (normal and tipper chassis) or 5,800 millimetres (230 in) (long chassis). The width is 2,400 millimetres (94 in) for all versions. The length (without rear bodywork) can be 7,297 millimetres (287.3 in) (tipper), 7,682 millimetres (302.4 in) (normal), 8,782 millimetres (345.7 in) (long). Chassis weight is 6,500 kilograms (14,300 lb), the payload is 10 tonnes (instead of GDME 10's original 7.5 tonnes) with either 18.4 tonnes GVW (tipper and long) or 19 tonnes GVW (long). The engine is the same MDER rated at 29 CV and with a maximum actual power of 125 metric horsepower (92 kW) at 1,600 rpm. As an optional, the lorry could be fitted with a 4-speed manual gearbox with a transfer case giving 8 forward speeds and 2 reverses, being the first GD series to offer other that a simple 4-speed gearbox. It initially had the two-part bonnet section of pre-war six cylinders, but it later adopted a single bonnet section as the four cylinders, giving one engine covering for each bonnet side instead of two. At the time, the GDME 10 was the heavier four wheel, rear drive produced by Berliet.

In June 1947, Berliet introduced the GDC 6 D, a lighter lorry based on the VDC 6 D, a truck originally sold for the V series. It kept the same cabin as its predecessor. It has a wheelbase of either 4,090 millimetres (161 in) (normal and tipper chassis) or 4,595 millimetres (180.9 in) (long chassis). The width is 2,290 millimetres (90 in) for all versions. The length (without rear bodywork) can be 6,345 millimetres (249.8 in) (tipper), 6,470 millimetres (255 in) (normal), 7,465 millimetres (293.9 in) (long). Chassis weight is 3,600 kilograms (7,900 lb), the payload is 5 tonnes with 9.8 tonnes GVW. The engine, named MDF 2 C, is an inline four diesel 110 mm bore x 150 mm stroke (5,702 cc) rated at 15 CV and with a maximum actual power of 65 metric horsepower (48 kW) at 1,800 rpm. The cabin is slightly different to that of the rest of the GD series, most notably: the radiator cover section of the grille is divided vertically into two parts while in the other models is one piece, the doors open from the rear instead of from the front.

In July 1948, the GDR 7 D was replaced by the GDR 7 W. The W makes reference to the air brakes the new lorry used as standard (replacing the servomechanical ones), supplied by French Westinghouse. The GDR 7 W has the same wheelbases and width as its predecessor. The length (without rear bodywork) can be 6,290 millimetres (248 in) (tipper), 6,633 millimetres (261.1 in) (normal), 7,646 millimetres (301.0 in) (long). Chassis weight, payload and GVW are the same. The engine used is the same MDB 3R later changed for the similar MDB 4 C, both keeping an identical power output. The main external design difference between the GDR 7 D and the GDR 7 W is that the latter has a larger bumper with horizontal chromed strips. The GDR 7 W was out of production in May 1952. A military version of the GDR 7 W, army type, was delivered from late 1947 to run supply routes in the French-controlled Sahara. It was a long chassis with various modifications: fuel tank of 300 litres instead of 140; installation on the right side of a 150-litre water tank; cabin with insulated roof, side blinds, two sun visors and independent driver's seat adjustable in height and back; metal sides of 0.6 metres; a support on the body for a second spare wheel; replacement of the standard 270 x 20 tyres for 11.25 x 20 and sand yellow livery. From the early 1950s, the French military tested successors for the GDR 7 W, including the four-wheel drive Renault R 2152 and the Willème LD 610. From 1952 onwards, the GDR 7 W was gradually replaced by its Berliet commercial successor of the GL series, the GLR 8. The last GDR 7 W army type in service was retired in 1957.

At the 1948 Paris Salon, Berliet unveiled a successor for the GDC 6 D, the GDC 6 W. The new lorry briefly kept the original GDC 6 D cabin before changing it for the GDR 7 W one. It also adopted Westinghouse's air brakes as standard. The GDC 6 W has the same wheelbases and width as its predecessor. The length (without rear bodywork) can be 6,220 millimetres (245 in) (tipper), 6,425 millimetres (253.0 in) (normal), 7,420 millimetres (292 in) (long). Chassis weight and payload are the same, the GVW 9.7 tonnes. The engine is the MDF 3 C, similar to the MDF 2 C and with the same power. In November 1950, the maximum power was increased to 75 metric horsepower (55 kW). Production ceased in August 1951.

In October 1948, the GDME 10.46 became the GDM 10 W (this lorry already had air brakes as standard). It adopted a new cabin with a styling similar to the GDR 7 W. Its wheelbases are 4,600 millimetres (180 in) (tipper chassis), 5,000 millimetres (200 in) (normal chassis) 5,800 millimetres (230 in) (long chassis). The length (without rear bodywork) can be 6,847 millimetres (269.6 in) (tipper), 7,682 millimetres (302.4 in) (normal), 8,782 millimetres (345.7 in) (long). Chassis weight, payload and GVW are the same. It was initially offered with the same engine and, from 1950 onwards, with the similar MDEC engine, maximum power of 135 metric horsepower (99 kW). The gearbox was initially a 4-speed with transfer case and later either a 5-speed or a 5-speed with transfer case (10 forwards, 2 reverses). Production ceased in October 1953.

From this later GD series Berliet developed tractor units. The TDR 7 W was developed from the GDR 7 W and was delivered with the same engine and most mechanics. The wheelbase is 3,100 millimetres (120 in). The chassis weight is 4,700 kilograms (10,400 lb), the payload 12 tonnes, the GCW of 20.5 tonnes. It was unveiled in November 1948 and produced until 1952. The company also developed a tractor unit from the GDM 10 W, the TDM 10 W. The wheelbase is 3,800 millimetres (150 in). The chassis weight is 6,350 kilograms (14,000 lb), the payload 20 tonnes, the GCW 32 tonnes.

Between 1952 and 1953, the GDC, GDR and GDM chassis were gradually replaced by the GLC, GLR and GLM, starting the GL series.
