= Audibert & Lavirotte =

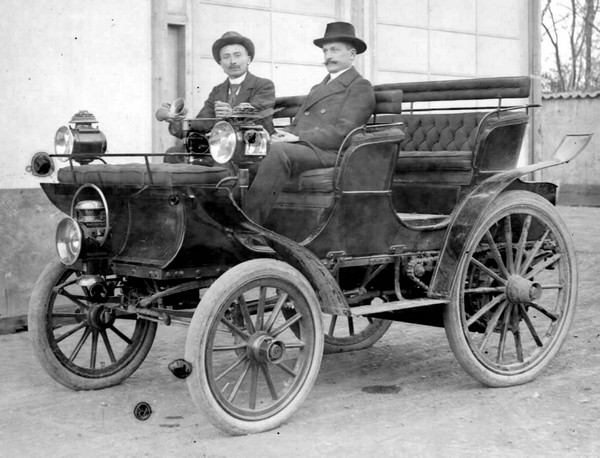
1897 Audibert et Lavirotte

The Audibert & Lavirotte was a French automobile, manufactured in Lyon from 1896 to 1901. The company, the oldest maker of automobiles in the city, was set up by Maurice Audibert and Emile Lavirotte built cars that were generally similar to the Benz. These were up to 6 horsepower, and featured belt drive and rear-mounted engines. In 1900, the company built three 36 hp racers, which were entered in the Nice-Salon-Nice race on 25 March 1901. They were the heaviest vehicles in the race, weighing over 1600 kilograms each. They manufactured a so-called Berline de Voyage, which may have been the first saloon car as early as 1898. The company ceased production in November 1901, after financiers did not pay and the factory was forced to shut down. The plant was taken over by Marius Berliet in 1902. Lavirotte helped finance this action and was employed by the Berliet company until his retirement in 1927. Audibert went to Rochet-Schneider. He died in 1931.

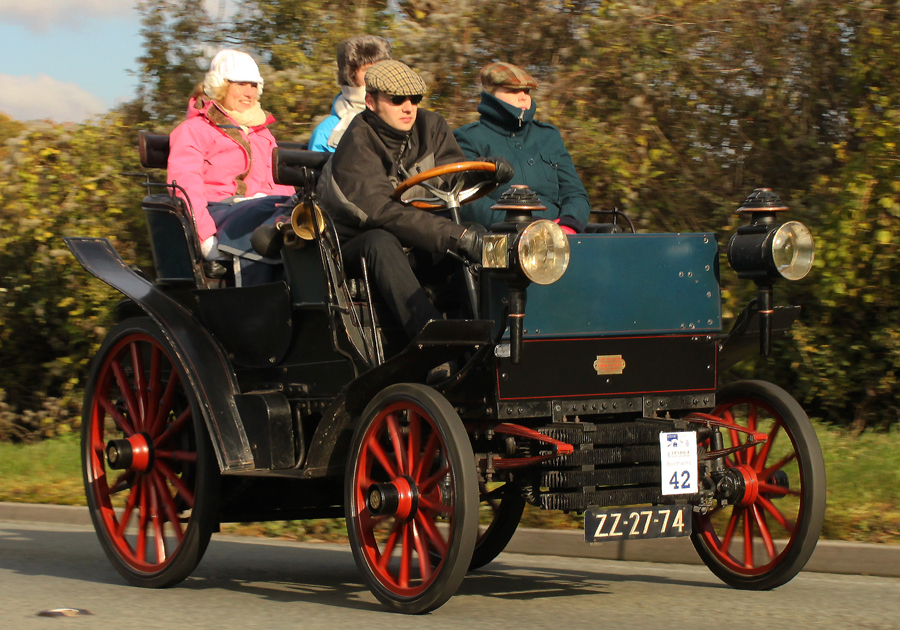
Audibert & Lavirotte 8HP Phaeton 1897
