= Berliet CBA =

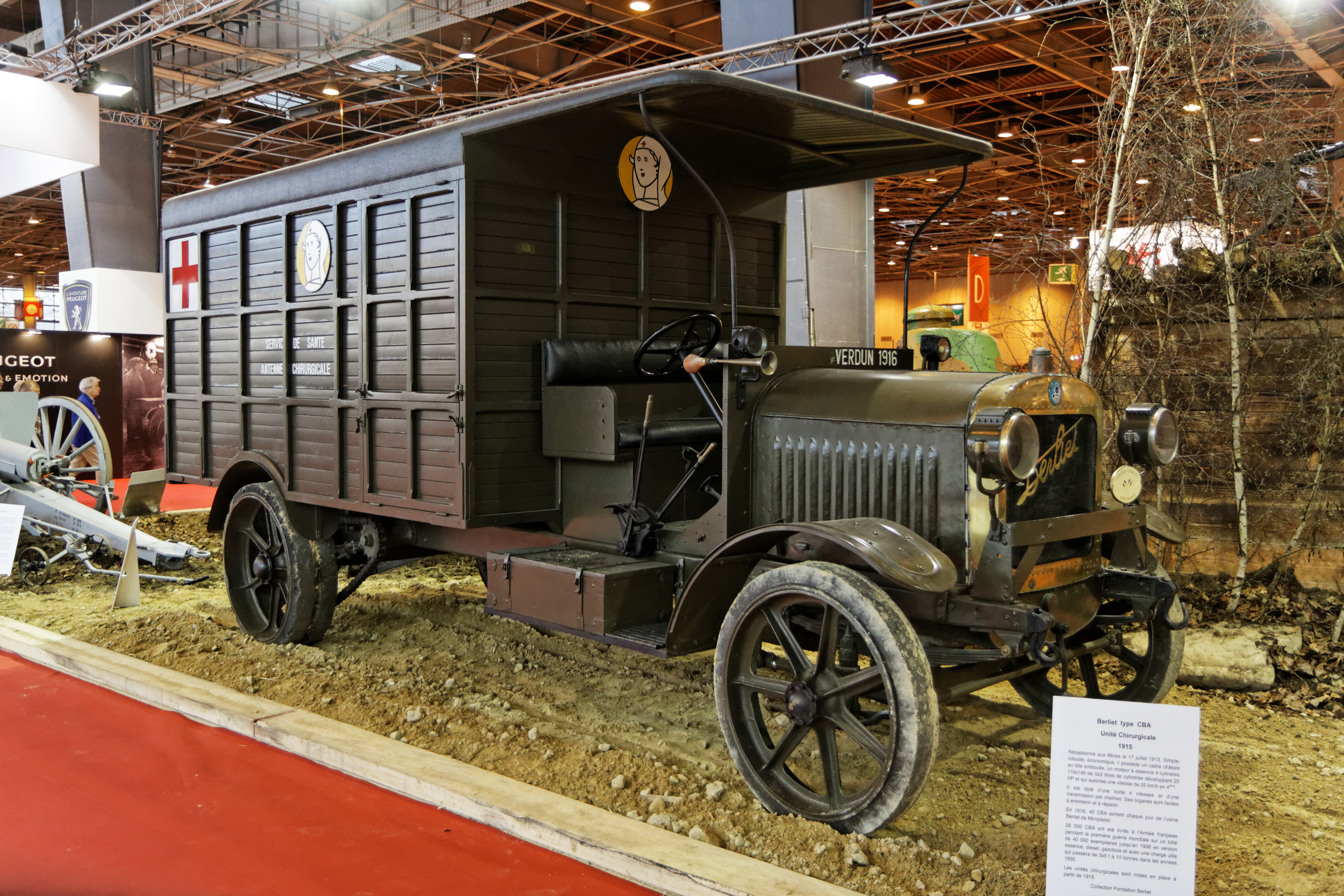

Overview
- Manufacturer: Berliet
- Production: 1913–1932
- Assembly: France: Lyon; France: Vénissieux

Body and chassis
- Layout: Front-engine, rear-wheel drive

Powertrain
- Transmission: 4-speed manual

Chronology
- Predecessor: Berliet M
- Successor: Berliet GD series

The Berliet CBA is a series of medium-duty trucks with chain drive, initially for the military and later also for commercial use. It was produced by the French manufacturer Berliet from 1913 to 1932, and was one of the most used trucks in World War I. It was replaced by the Berliet GD series.

== History and technical details ==
=== World War I ===
The first CBA vehicles, built in 1913, were fitted with an inline four petrol engine (codenamed L) with a bore of 100 mm and a stroke of 140 mm, giving a displacement of 4,398 cm^{3}. Its power was reported as 22, likely fiscal horsepower (CV). The actual power output was probably higher, but no information is available. The curb weight of these vehicles is 3,250 kilograms (7,170 lb), and the payload of 2.8 to 3 tonnes. The truck has a rear-wheel transmission by chain drive. Brakes are through a pedal acting on the transmission and a lever operating two drums on the rear. In 1913, the French army tested two vehicles, but did not decide to buy larger numbers. Mass production was ordered when World War I broke out in early August 1914 and the French army needed trucks to transport troops and materiel. This variant of the Berliet CBA was built until about mid-1915. There was a forward control version of the CBA produced in 1913 for the military tests, the CBD. By the late 1910s, the CBD was being used primarily as a transit bus and as a 30-seat coach.

By mid-1914, Berliet introduced a more powerful engine (codenamed Z) for the truck which had its bore increased to 110 mm, giving a 5,322 cm^{3} displacement. Its power was specified as 30 CV. The payload was increased to 3.5 and later to 4 tonnes, the curb weight was reduced by 65 kilograms (143 lb) compared to the older model. This variant with a more powerful engine replaced the older type in production from mid-1915. Thousands of units were built up until the end of the war in 1918 and for some time afterwards, and were supplied to the French army as well as to civilian customers. This variant remained the main one until it was discontinued in 1926.

Most of the vehicles had a cabin covered with a canvas tarpaulin but otherwise open, and a loading platform also covered with a tarpaulin. There also were CBAs with a wooden body for the medical troops (sterilisation, radiology and transport vehicle), with built-on machine gun for anti-aircraft defense and as a towing vehicle for lighter trailers. From 1918 onwards, various CBAs were used for motorised field artillery regiments, as they could transport a gun and ammunition on their loading area.

=== Later years ===
Some CBAs were lost as a result of the war, others were sold to civilian customers after it ended (usually publicly auctioned), the rest remained in depots as materiel reserve in case of renewed mobilisation.

In 1919, newly-built CBAs received a different cabin: sheet metal panelling on a hardwood frame, the left side received a door, the roof consisted of a tarred cloth stretched over a wooden frame. In 1923, newly delivered CBAs were fitted with a windscreen and a rear-view mirror. Those vehicles were mainly sold to civilian customers, but a total of 449 units were also delivered to the French army, between 1924 and 1926. The curb weight had increased to 3,840 kilograms (8,470 lb), the payload to 4 tonnes. The wheelbase was extended by 5 mm, the cargo area was expanded. The vehicle still has chain drive and solid rubber tyres, and its size was now 940 mm x 140 mm at the front and 1,000 mm x 140 mm for the rear double wheels. The engine kept the previous cylinder dimensions, now rated at 25 CV.

In 1920, Berliet presented the CBA9, a variant with a payload increased to 5 tonnes: the vehicle's empty weight with tarpaulin is 4,630 kilograms (10,210 lb) (4,990 to 5,830 kg with tanker body), the wheelbase was extended to 4.20 m, the platform to 3.88 m. The engine has the previous dimensions, but uses the codename Z17 and was rated at 24 CV. Its maximum power output is at 1,400 rpm. The French army acquired a truck of this type with a flatbed and tarpaulin in 1924, ten with a tanker body in 1925 and an additional twenty with a tipper in 1926. The French Air Force bought some trucks of this type with tanker bodies in 1926 and 17 more in 1927.

The Berliet CBAB was produced from 1925/1926 to 1932. The army only ordered 37 of these, most of them went to civilian customers. The vehicle still has rear-wheel chain drive and solid rubber tyres (front 1,030 mm x 140 mm, double rears 1,030 mm x 160 mm). The wheelbase is 4.19 m, the cargo area measures 3.80 x 1.85 m. It has curb weight of 5,131 kilograms (11,312 lb), the payload was 3.5 tonnes. The engine was similar but changed its codename to MLB4 and was rated 20 CV at 1,300 rpm. In 1928, two CBABs with gasifier were delivered to the army under the designation CBAG. Two more followed in 1929 and 21 more (with pneumatics) in 1930 with the name CBABG2.

The Berliets GCA and GCAB were variants of the CBA with an extended wheelbase. They were built in 1923 and 1924 only for the army (and not for civilian customers) and were the first Berliet trucks whose type designation began with a G (from this point onwards most names of new Berliet truck models with a payload of more than 3 tonnes began with a G). The curb weight is unknown, the payload 5 tonnes. The wheelbase measures 4.65 m, the loading area 3.60 x 1.85 m. The tyres (still solid rubber) were 1,030 mm x 140 mm at the front and 1,030 mm x 160 mm at the rear (double wheels). The four-cylinder engine with the designation Z3, classified as 25 CV, has the already known dimensions of 110 mm x 140 mm and the real power output was of 38 metric horsepower (28 kW) for the GCA and 36 metric horsepower (26 kW) for the GCAB. The French army acquired 40 units between 1923 and 1924.

In 1926, Berliet introduced a final variant of the CBA truck, the CBAC, to replace the CBA9. The CBAC had a petrol engine similar to its predecessors (this time codenamed MLB6) and chain drive. It was offered in short and long versions. The short has a wheelbase of 4.74 m, the long of 4.86 m. The CBAC payload is of 5 tonnes and its official power 15 CV. Tyres are 1,016 mm x 203 mm. Its short version has a curb weight of 6,100 kilograms (13,400 lb). In 1931, Berliet marketed a CBAC with an inline four diesel engine. Originally, it had a 110 mm bore and 160 mm stroke, giving a displacement of 6,082 cm^{3} and was codenamed as MDA. Later, Berliet introduced a version with a bore increased to 120 mm, codenamed MDB, giving a displacement of 7,238 cm^{3}. The MDA was rated at 23 CV, with an actual power of 45 metric horsepower (33 kW). The MDB was rated at 28 CV, with an actual power of 55 metric horsepower (40 kW). In 1932, the French military ordered 14 CBACs with the petrol engine to be used as multipurpose transports.

By the late 1920s, Berliet had a full range of chain drive medium-duty truck chassis derived from the CBA: the CBAB, the CBAC, the GCM (7.5 tonnes payload, 24 CV), the GCE (7.5 tonnes payload, 20 CV), the GPC (six wheeler, 10 tonnes payload, 20 CV). There also were various variants with gasifier.

In 1926, Berliet introduced a new series of medium-duty trucks with universal joints instead of chain drive, called the GD. They gradually replaced the CBAs and their derivatives. The CBA series ended production in 1932.
