= Berliet Dauphine 11CV =

Berliet Dauphine
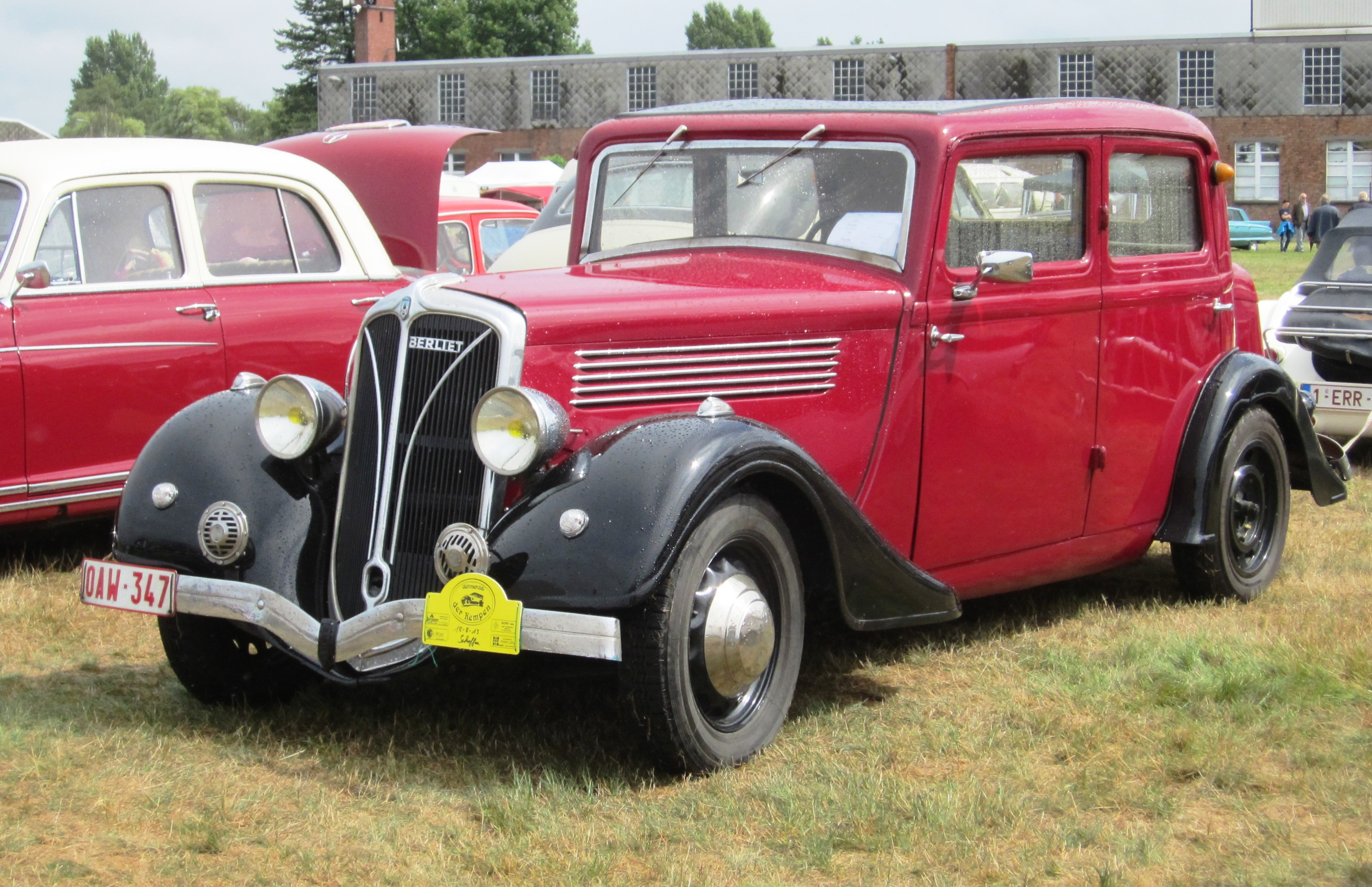
- Berliet Dauphine berline (ca 1936)

Overview
- Manufacturer: Berliet
- Also called: Berliet Type VIRP 11 (1934-1939); Berliet Type VIRP 9 (1934-1937)
- Production: 1934-1939
- Assembly: Vénissieux

Body and chassis
- Body style: Roadster cabriolet 4 or 2 door saloon/sedan « Berline » or « Coach »

Powertrain
- Engine: 1990 cc four-cylinder 1934-39; 1600 cc four-cylinder 1934-37
- Transmission: Four speed manual

Dimensions
- Wheelbase: 2,850 mm (112 in) (1934-1936); 2,980 mm (117 in) (9CV 1936-1939); 3,080 mm (121 in) (1937-1939)

The Berliet Dauphine is a family car produced by Berliet at their Vénissieux plant on the south side of Lyon between summer 1934 and 1939. The original cars had a 1990cc engine placing them in the 11CV car tax band, but this was quickly joined by a 1,600cc (9CV) version, and at one stage a 14CV powered version was advertised as available “sur commande” (only if specially ordered).

For most of its production run the Dauphine was the principal or only passenger car produced by Berliet. In the end it was also Berliet’s final car. After the war the company concentrated on building trucks and buses.

== Chassis ==
The principal longitudinal bars of the chassis curved up at the ends which meant that the car body sat lower on the road than on cars featuring a more traditional 1920s style "overslung" chassis. The Dauphine’s chassis was also noteworthy for following the recent trend to independent front suspension, the front wheels being suspended from a transverse leaf spring, and here combined with rack and pinion steering. At the back there was a traditional rigid axle suspended from a pair of longitudinally mounted leaf-springs.

== Bodies ==
The car was offered as a four door “Berline” sedan/saloon and as a two door “Coach” sedan/saloon. There was also a sporting bodied “Roadster” and a two door five seater “Cabriolet”. However, the “Roadster” and “Coach” bodied cars were delisted in 1935, leaving just the four door “Berline” and the “Cabriolet”.

The bodies were manufactured in what was becoming a rather old fashioned manner, with the structural strength coming from a timber frame over which steel panels were fitted. By this time, competitor vehicles from volume automakers such as the Peugeot 402, Renault Primaquatre and Citroën Traction were coming with all-steel bodies formed from sheet steel using heavy presses, and without the need for any separate structural frame underneath the panels. The all-steel car bodies could be more curvaceously styled and, given sufficient volumes, more cheaply produced, but Berliet sold fewer than 10,000 Dauphines, and this would have fallen far short of the volumes necessary to amortise the high capital costs involved with heavy steel presses and dies for stamping body panels.

== Engines and transmission ==
The 11CV 1,990cc four cylinder water-cooled unit delivered a maximum of 50 hp (37 kW) at 4,000 rpm to the rear wheels via a conventional 4-speed manual gear box. The maximum power listed for the 9CV 1600cc unit was 40 hp (30 kW) at 4,000 rpm. The 9CV engine was removed from the list for Model Year 1938, leaving just the 11CV Dauphine offered.

A “special order” 14CV engine was advertised for a few months during the middle part of 1937, but had also been delisted by the time of the motor show in October 1937.

== Evolution ==
Between 1933 and 1938 there were few obvious changes. However, the wheelbase of the larger engined 11CV was increased to 3,080 mm (121 in) for the 1937 model year, while that of the smaller engined 9CV was extended to 2,980 mm (117 in). Previously, both cars had sat on a 2,850 mm (112 in) wheelbase which according to some customer reports had provided insufficient interior leg space.

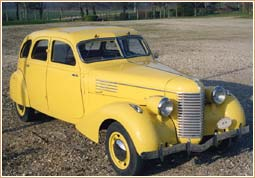
For 1939 the manufacturer gave up producing car bodies of its own. The final Berliet Dauphines emerged hiding a Berliet chassis and mechanical elements under the body of a Peugeot 402, albeit with the wind-cheating Peugeot grille replaced by a fashionable American-style front section.

The reduction of choice in terms of body types and engine option also found an echo in the range of colours offered which by the time of the October 1937 Motor Show was down to just four (black, blue, green and grey). Berliet’s Vénissieux plant experienced more than its fair share of strikes and lockouts during a decade characterised by a growth in political division and labour unrest, and towards the end of the decade the Dauphine’s body was looking increasingly dated, while its old fashioned structure would have made it relatively costly to produce.

Peugeot’s 402 was a rival to the Dauphine, but also suggested a solution of sorts. At the 32nd Paris Motor Show in October 1938 Berliet presented a completely rebodied Dauphine, displaying the curved panels that were becoming mainstream for the volume auto-makers, reflecting the switch to pressed steel car bodies. Only four of the rebodied cars were on the Berliet show stand, and they were not at this stage included in the manufacturer's price lists. Prices were announced on 28 November 1938, although production commenced, at a rather gentle rate, only during the first part of 1939. Berliet's passenger car output volumes did not begin to justify the capital cost for steel presses and dies used to stamp out panels for all-steel car bodies, and for 1939 the manufacturer gave up producing car bodies.

The final Berliet Dauphines emerged hiding a Berliet chassis and mechanical elements under the body of a Peugeot 402, albeit with the Peugeot grille replaced by a modern grille designed by Berliet. Although in retrospect the solution appears as a bizarre route to oblivion, Berliet was not the only low volume automaker of midmarket cars to adopt this solution to the cost squeeze associated with the arrival of all-steel car bodies. In the Paris area La Licorne had already launched a range of cars using the body of a Citroën Traction, and across the Rhine bodies produced by Ambi Budd in Berlin for Adler also ended up being sold in relatively small volumes to German competitor auto-makers. Berliet’s own Peugeot bodied Dauphine, launched in March 1939 at the Lyon Trade Fair, arrived just in time for the outbreak of war. Barely 200 were produced, and many of these were simply painted khaki and sold to the French army.
