= Berliet GL series =

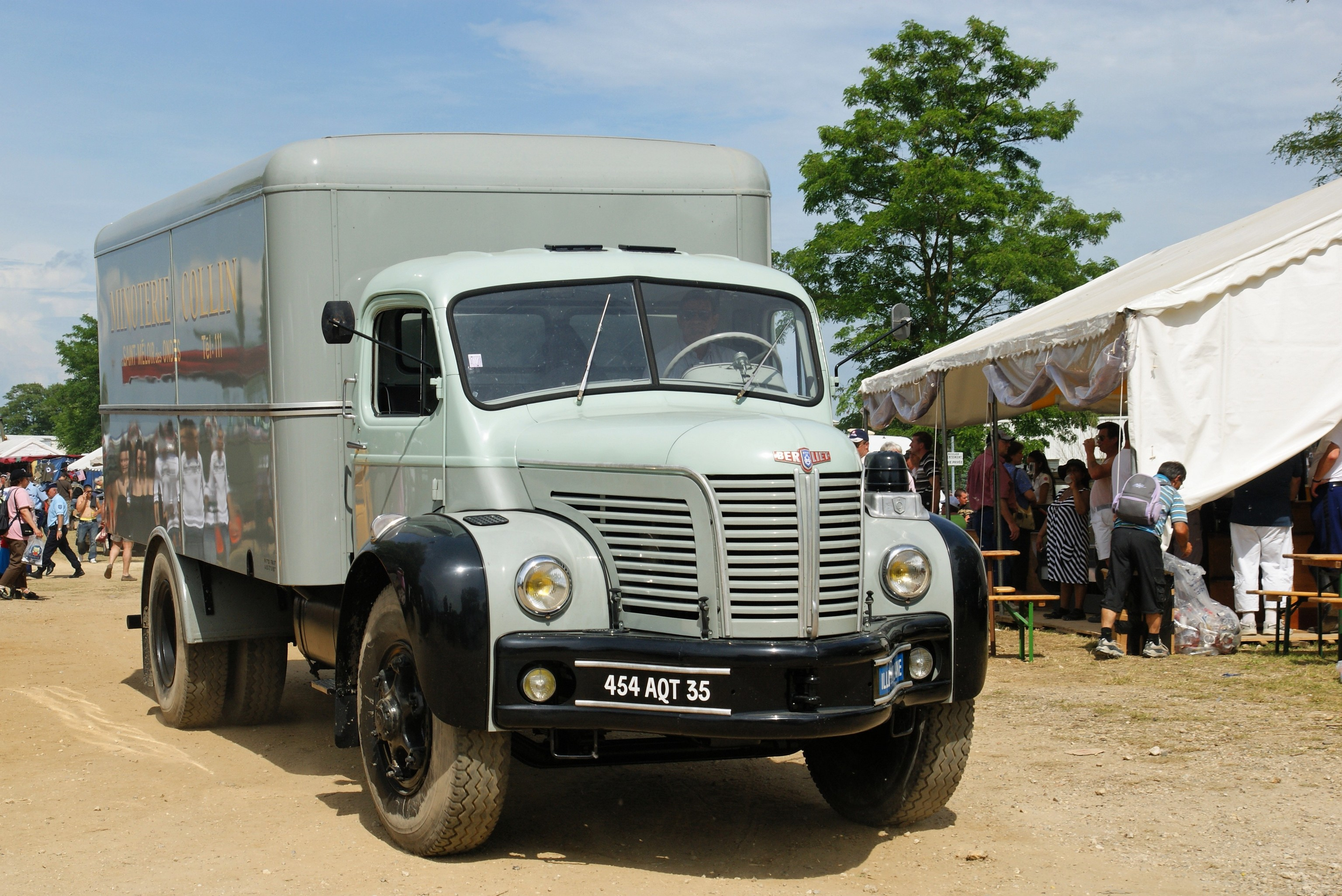
- Berliet GLR (initial design)

Overview
- Manufacturer: Berliet; Renault Véhicules Industriels
- Also called: Berliet GLC/GLR/GLM; Berliet GBH/GBM/TBH; Berliet TLC/TLR/TLM
- Production: 1950–1977
- Assembly: France: Vénissieux; Algeria: Rouïba

Body and chassis
- Class: Heavy truck
- Layout: Front-engine, rear-wheel drive; Front engine, 6x4 or 6x6 drive

Powertrain
- Transmission: 4/5/6-speed manual (most models)

Chronology
- Predecessor: Berliet GD series
- Successor: Renault CBH; Renault GBC 180

The Berliet GL series is a semi-cab-over truck series first presented by Berliet in 1949 and manufactured until 1977. Over 100,000 examples were built in the 27 years it was in production. The range consisted of the GLC, GLR, and GLM models. Berliet called the design philosophy "modular construction", but it was more a matter of standardization, with the GL series sharing the maximum of components across several types of trucks. The GLs spanned a weight range between 13.5 and 19 tonnes (29,800 and 41,900 lb). The most common and famous variant, the GLR, is often used as shorthand to describe the entire family. The GLR was voted Truck of the 20th Century by French journal Les Routiers in 1994.

== History ==
The first version was the GLR, presented in October 1949 at the Paris Motor Show. Production started in 1950. In 1951, the lighter-duty GLC appeared, followed by the heavier-duty GLM in 1953.

The GLC was shorter and lighter thanks to being fitted with a four-cylinder derivative of the GLR's MDU engine, along with a chassis, transmission, and axles of a separate, lighter design. The GLC was rather slow but nonetheless sold well in the domestic French market. It was also very successful in Africa, where economy and robustness counted for more than speed. A GLC weighed about 700 kg (1,543 lb) less than a GLR of the same wheelbase.

The mechanicals, while remaining similar in specifications, underwent steady updates throughout the term of production. The appearance changed more considerably; the original Serie M cab was replaced by the "M2" in October 1960; this model retained the original cabin and doors but had a taller, more square bonnet. This was replaced by the new "Relaxe" M3 cabin in 1963. The Relaxe design was developed for the cabover Berliet GAK and had first appeared in 1958; for the GL series it was installed behind the existing, long bonnet introduced on the M2. This was updated again in 1974, becoming the Relaxe M4. The sheetmetal remained mostly the same, but the dashboard was changed and many chrome parts such as the doorhandles were substituted for chunkier design from black plastic. The somewhat curvy sidevents on the bonnet were removed, replaced by rectangular, black plastic grilles.

In addition to the GLC, GLR, and GLM versions there were also the TLC, TLR, and TLM - corresponding tractor models. The tractors received two-speed rear axles. There were also tractor variants of the 6x4 GBH (TBH) and for oversize loads the GBO and TBO (truck, tractor), available in 6x4 or 6x6 layouts.

In 1958, local assembly began at the Société Africaine des Automobiles M. Berliet (S.A.D.A.B.) in Rouïba, Algeria - to meet local needs but also with an eye towards penetrating the African market. The regular range was finally discontinued in 1977, but the 6x4 GBH series - popular on construction sites as well as in Africa - continued to be built until 1984. GBHs built after 1980 were given Renault Véhicules Industriels (RVI) badges, after Berliet (and Saviem) were merged into this new company. The GL series was superseded by the new Renault CBH, which largely used the Berliet GLR's underpinnings with the new Club of Four cabin design.

=== L64 ===
In January 1962, Berliet presented the lightweight, heavy-duty L62 and L64 models. Building on lessons learned from the GBC 8 "Gazelle" 6×6. The new L64 (4×4) and L62 (4×2) were short, robust, and tall, fitted with the four-cylinder engine. Developed specifically for sub-Saharan African conditions, they were extensively tested in Gabon and the Congo. The front and rear axles were Herwaythorn designs, built by Berliet. Berliet deemed a bonneted design a necessity for Africa, for simplicity and ease of access, safety, to minimimze front axle load, and to increase driver comfort on uneven roads and also avoiding placing the cabin on top of the heat-emitting engine. The L64 also found success in Europe with road works, on construction sites, and for other off-road usage.

It was quickly noted that the four-cylinder engine was not up to the task of dealing with deep sand; to better suit users in the Maghreb, Berliet installed the five-cylinder MDU engine in a model called the L64/8 (four-wheel drive only). The four-cylinder variant was eventually renamed the L64/6. All three variants received the new M3 Relaxe cabin in 1965, followed by the new M4 cab in 1974, at which time they had been renamed the L646R and L648R. The L64 was still in production in 1980, by which time around 3,000 examples had been built. Around 80 percent of the L64s produced were sold in Africa.

== Mechanicals ==
The GL series used four-, five-, or six-cylinder diesels manufactured in house. The engines differed considerably in size, accordingly, the bonnet sheet metal was produced in three different lengths. The model names (eg "GLC 8", "GLM 10") included the displacement, rounded to the nearest litre. The engines initially used Ricardo's indirect injection system and "Comet III" combustion chamber design. Starting in 1958, this engine design was gradually replaced by a direct injection system called "Magic", developed by Germany's M.A.N.. Power went up considerably; maximum output of the GLR 8's 7.9-litre, five-cylinder engine increased from 120 to 150 PS (88 to 110 kW).

Engine name	Displacement	Dimensions	Engine layout		Power	Torque	Models	Years
MDX	6,333 cc (386.5 cu in)	120 mm × 140 mm (4.72 in × 5.51 in)	I4	Indirect injection, Ricardo Comet III	100 PS (74 kW) at 2,000 rpm	34 kg⋅m (333 N⋅m; 246 lb⋅ft) at 1,500 rpm	GLC 6, GLR 6, TLC 6	1951–1959?
MDX-M420	6,333 cc (386.5 cu in)	120 mm × 140 mm (4.72 in × 5.51 in)	I4	Direct injection, M.A.N. "Magic"	120 PS (88 kW) at 2,200 rpm		GLC 6, GLR 6, TLC 6	1959?–1974
MDX-M420	6,333 cc (386.5 cu in)	120 mm × 140 mm (4.72 in × 5.51 in)	I4	Direct injection, M.A.N. "Magic"	130 PS SAE (96 kW) at 2,200 rpm	46 kg⋅m (451 N⋅m; 333 lb⋅ft) at 1,400 rpm	L62/L64	1962–1971
MDU	7,917 cc (483.1 cu in)	120 mm × 140 mm (4.72 in × 5.51 in)	I5	Indirect injection, Ricardo Comet III	120 PS (88 kW) at 2,000 rpm		GLC 8, GLR 8, TLC 8, TLR 8	1950–1958
MDU	7,917 cc (483.1 cu in)	120 mm × 140 mm (4.72 in × 5.51 in)	I5	Indirect injection, Ricardo Comet III	125 PS (92 kW) at 2,100 rpm		GLC 8b, etcetera; GBC 8b	1956–1959
MDU-M520	7,917 cc (483.1 cu in)	120 mm × 140 mm (4.72 in × 5.51 in)	I5	Direct injection, M.A.N. "Magic"	150 PS (110 kW) at 2,200 rpm	56.5 kg⋅m (554 N⋅m; 409 lb⋅ft) at 1,500 rpm	GLR 8M, etcetera	1958–1975
MDU-M520	7,917 cc (483.1 cu in)	120 mm × 140 mm (4.72 in × 5.51 in)	I5	Direct injection, M.A.N. "Magic"	162 PS SAE (119 kW) at 2,200 rpm	56 kg⋅m (549 N⋅m; 405 lb⋅ft) at 1,400 rpm	GLR160, L64/8	1974–1977?
MID 06.20.30	8,822 cc (538.4 cu in)	120 mm × 130 mm (4.72 in × 5.12 in)	I6	Direct injection, Berliet	200 PS (147 kW)		GLR200	1974–1977?
MDZ	9,500 cc (579.7 cu in)	120 mm × 140 mm (4.72 in × 5.51 in)	I6	Indirect injection, Ricardo Comet III	150 PS (110 kW) at 2,200 rpm	54 kg⋅m (530 N⋅m; 391 lb⋅ft) at 1,600 rpm	GLM 10, GBM 10, GLR 10, TLR 10	1953–1959?
MDZ13	9,500 cc (579.7 cu in)	120 mm × 140 mm (4.72 in × 5.51 in)	I6	Indirect injection, turbocharged	175 PS (129 kW) at 2,000 rpm	65 kg⋅m (637 N⋅m; 470 lb⋅ft) at 1,700 rpm	GLM 10	1956–1960
MDZ-M620	9,500 cc (579.7 cu in)	120 mm × 140 mm (4.72 in × 5.51 in)	I6	Direct injection, M.A.N. "Magic"	180 PS (132 kW) at 2,100 rpm	61 kg⋅m (598 N⋅m; 441 lb⋅ft) at 1,500 rpm	GLM 10, GBM 10, GLR 10, TLR 10	1958–1975
MDZ-M620	9,500 cc (579.7 cu in)	120 mm × 140 mm (4.72 in × 5.51 in)	I6	Direct injection, M.A.N. "Magic"	192 PS SAE (141 kW)		GLR200	197?–1974?
M635	12,024 cc (733.7 cu in)	135 mm × 140 mm (5.31 in × 5.51 in)	I6	Direct injection, M.A.N. "Magic"	240 PS SAE (177 kW) at 2,200 rpm	85 kg⋅m (834 N⋅m; 615 lb⋅ft) at 1,300 rpm	GLM 12, GBH 12, TLM 12, TBH 12	1963–1967?
M635	12,024 cc (733.7 cu in)	135 mm × 140 mm (5.31 in × 5.51 in)	I6	Direct injection, M.A.N. "Magic"	250 or 260 PS (184 or 191 kW) at 2,200 rpm	89 kg⋅m (873 N⋅m; 644 lb⋅ft) at 1,300 rpm	GBH 12, GBH260, TLR280, TLR260	1967–1984
M635	12,024 cc (733.7 cu in)	135 mm × 140 mm (5.31 in × 5.51 in)	I6	Direct injection, turbocharged	282 PS (207 kW)		GBH 12, GBH280	1973–?
MDO	14,778 cc (901.8 cu in)	140 mm × 160 mm (5.51 in × 6.30 in)	I6	Indirect injection, Ricardo Comet III	200 PS (147 kW) at 1,800 rpm	75 kg⋅m (735 N⋅m; 542 lb⋅ft)	GLM 15, GBM 15, GBO 15, TLM 15, TBO 15	1955–1959?
MDO-M640	14,778 cc (901.8 cu in)	140 mm × 160 mm (5.51 in × 6.30 in)	I6	Direct injection, M.A.N. "Magic"	240 PS (177 kW) at 2,000 rpm	97 kg⋅m (951 N⋅m; 702 lb⋅ft) at 1,200 rpm	GLM 15, GBM 15, GBO 15, TLM 15, TBO 15	1959?–1967

== Gallery ==
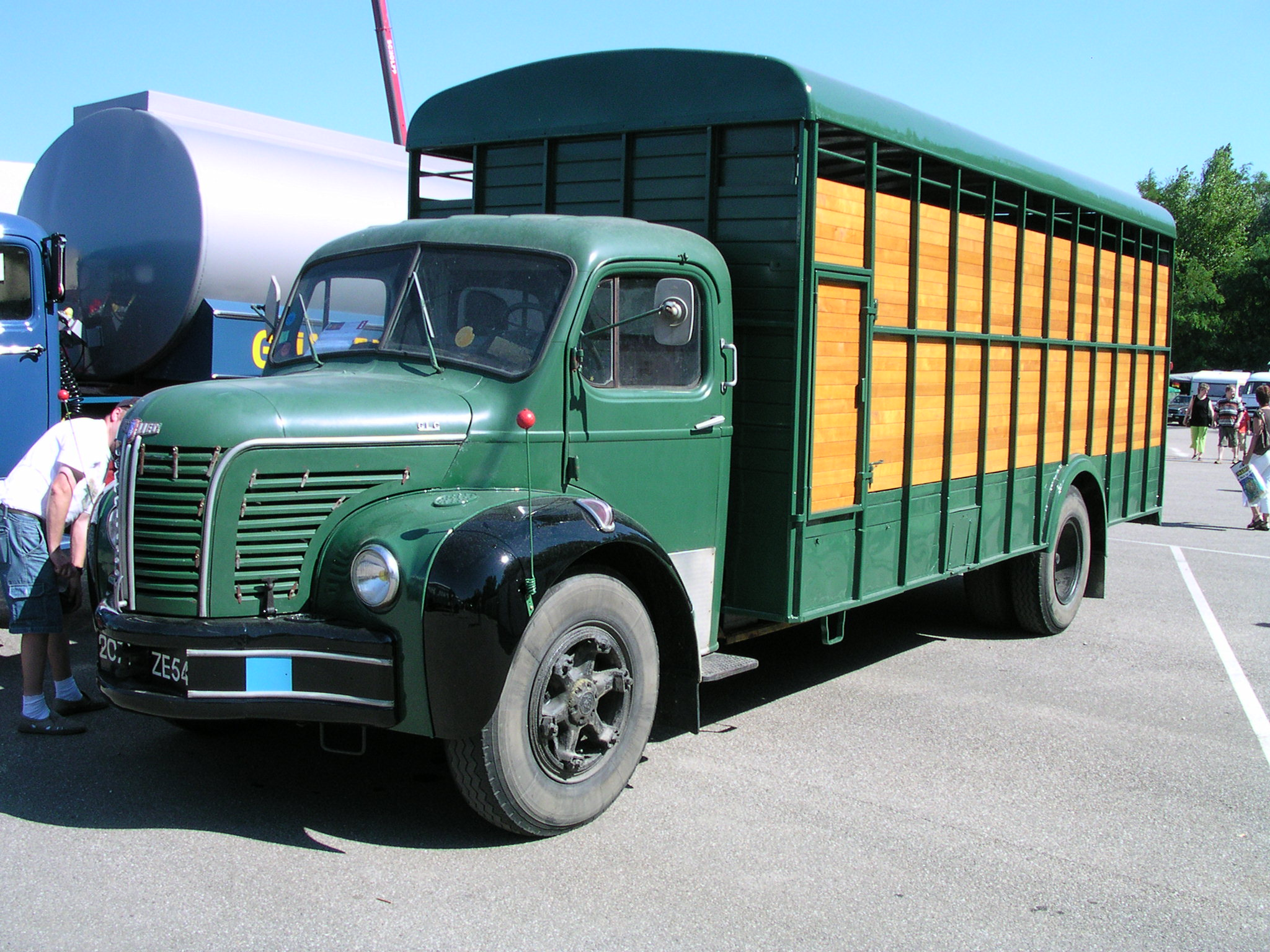
Berliet GLC 6 with the initial (M) cab

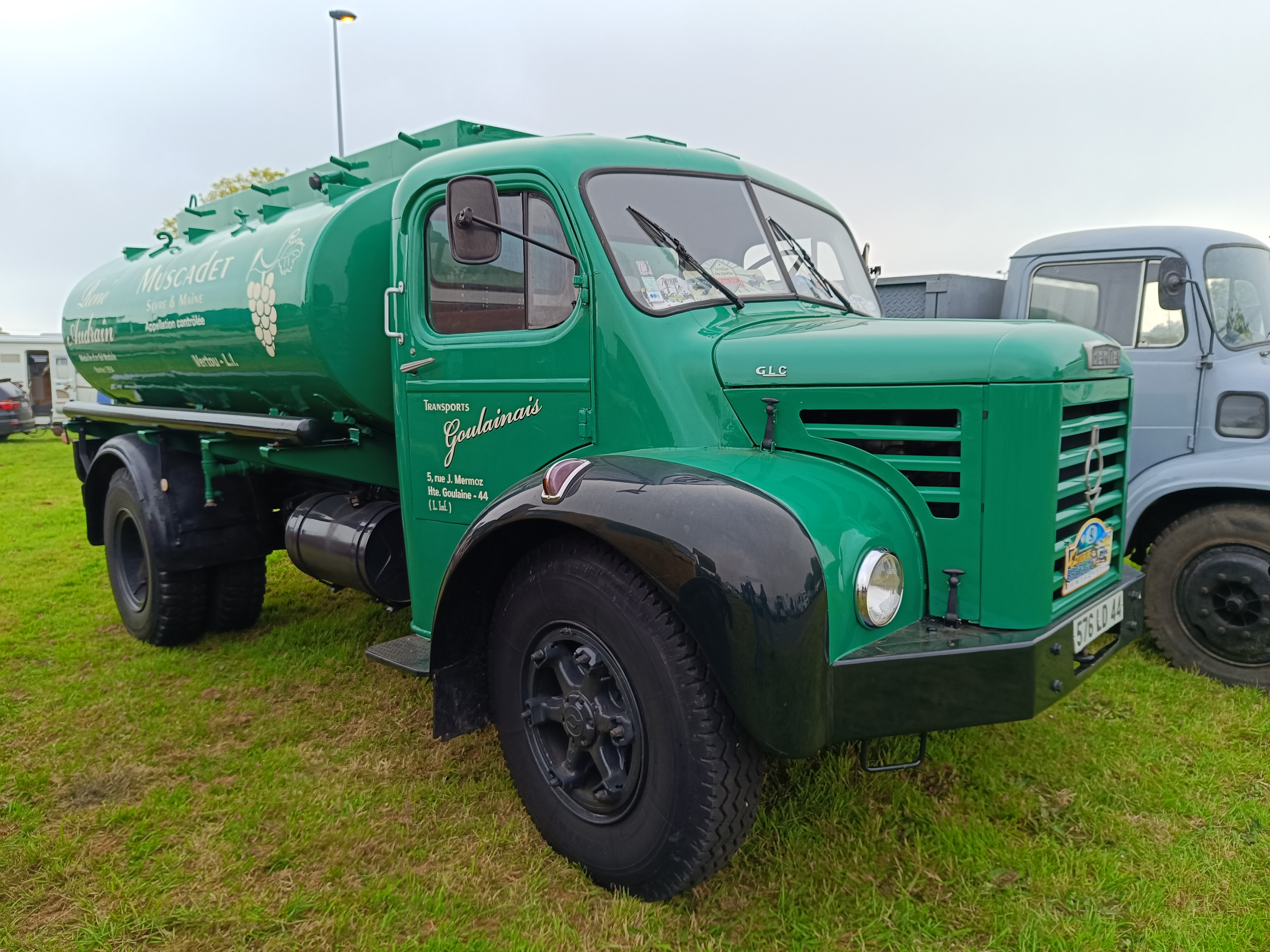
Berliet GLC 6 with the M2 cab; this is a four-cylinder model with the short nose

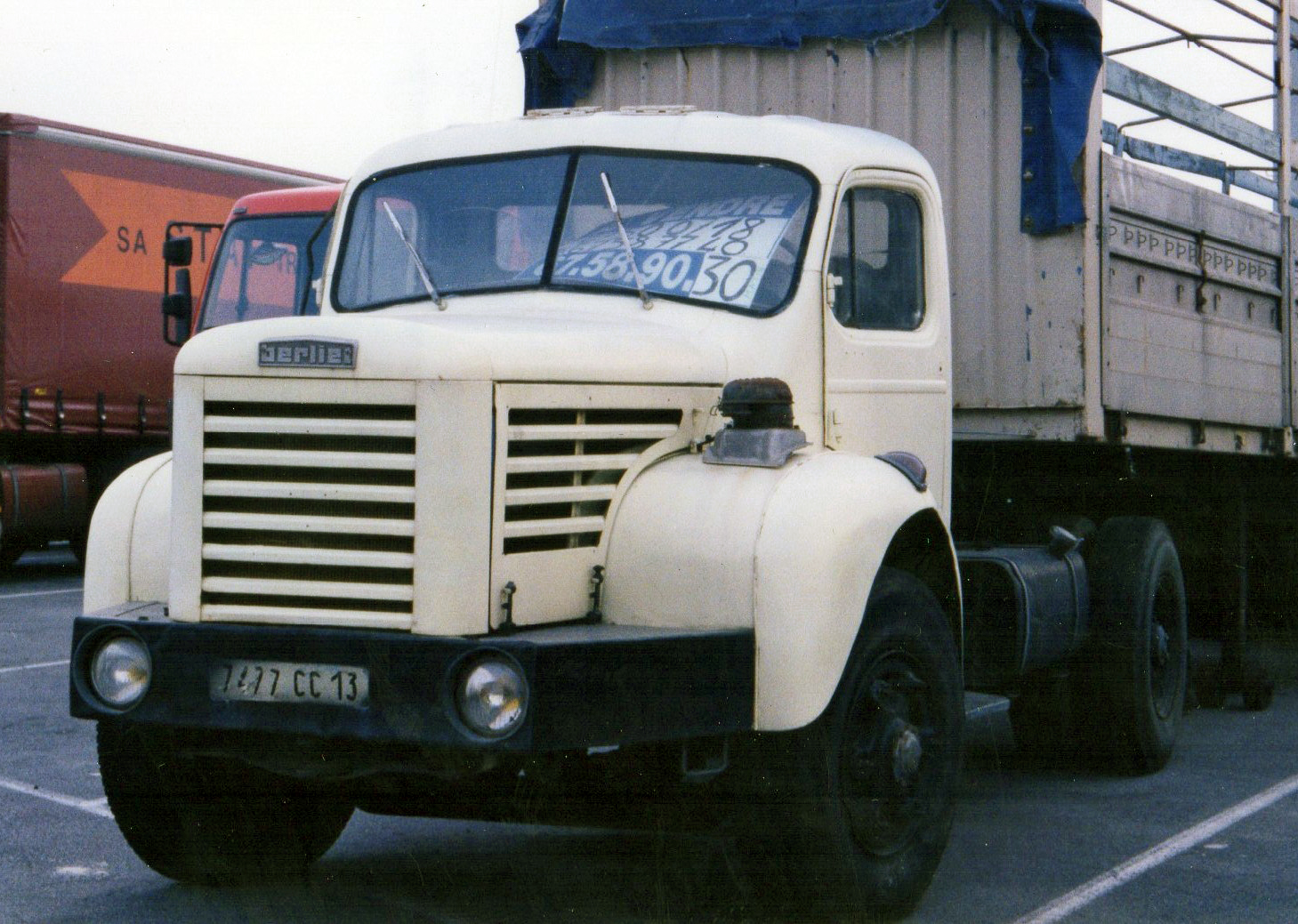
Berliet TLM 10 tractor with the M2 cab; six-cylinder model with the long bonnet

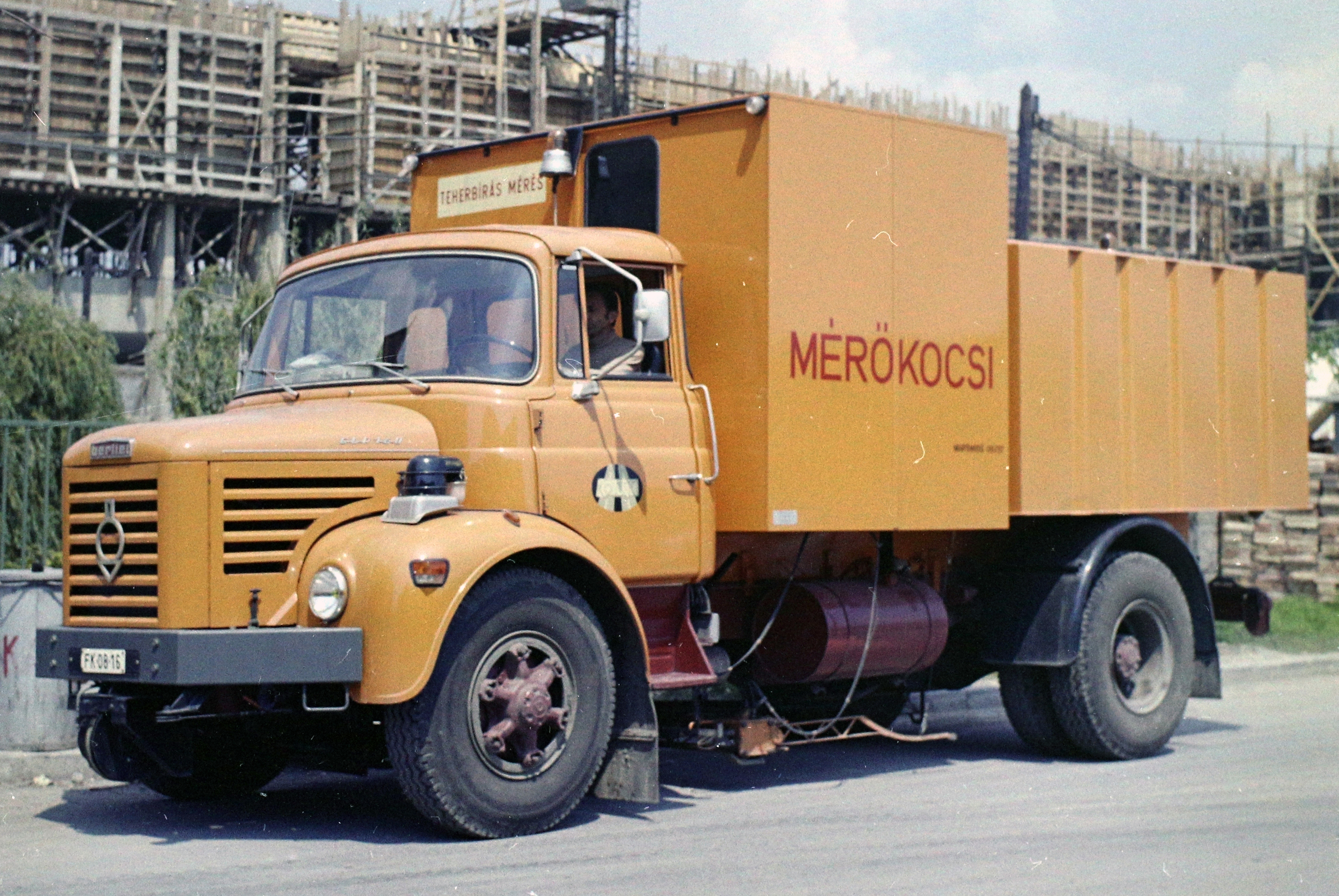
Berliet GLR (160hp) with the M3 Relaxe cab and medium bonnet

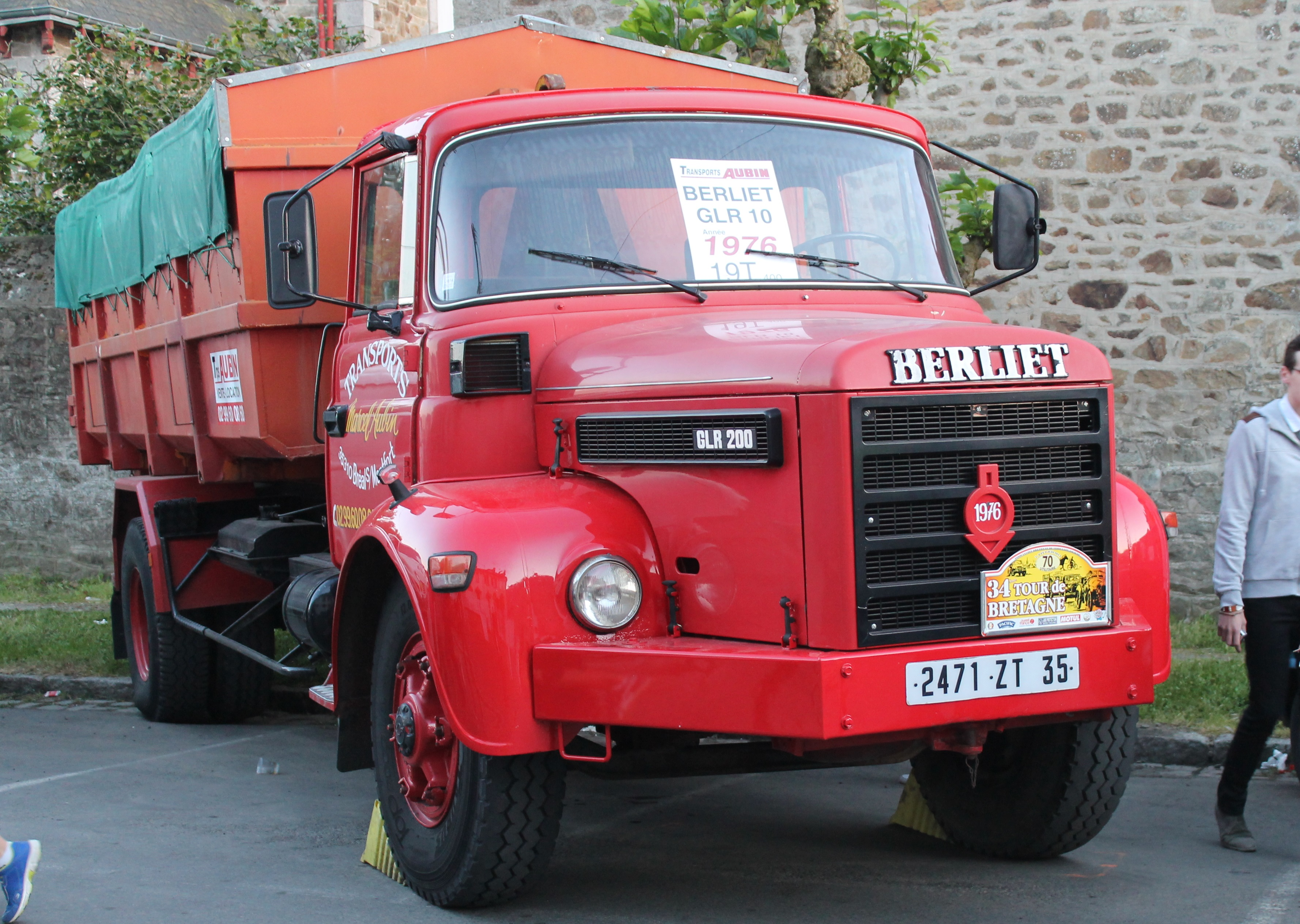
1976 Berliet GLR 10 (200hp) with the final M4 Relaxe cab

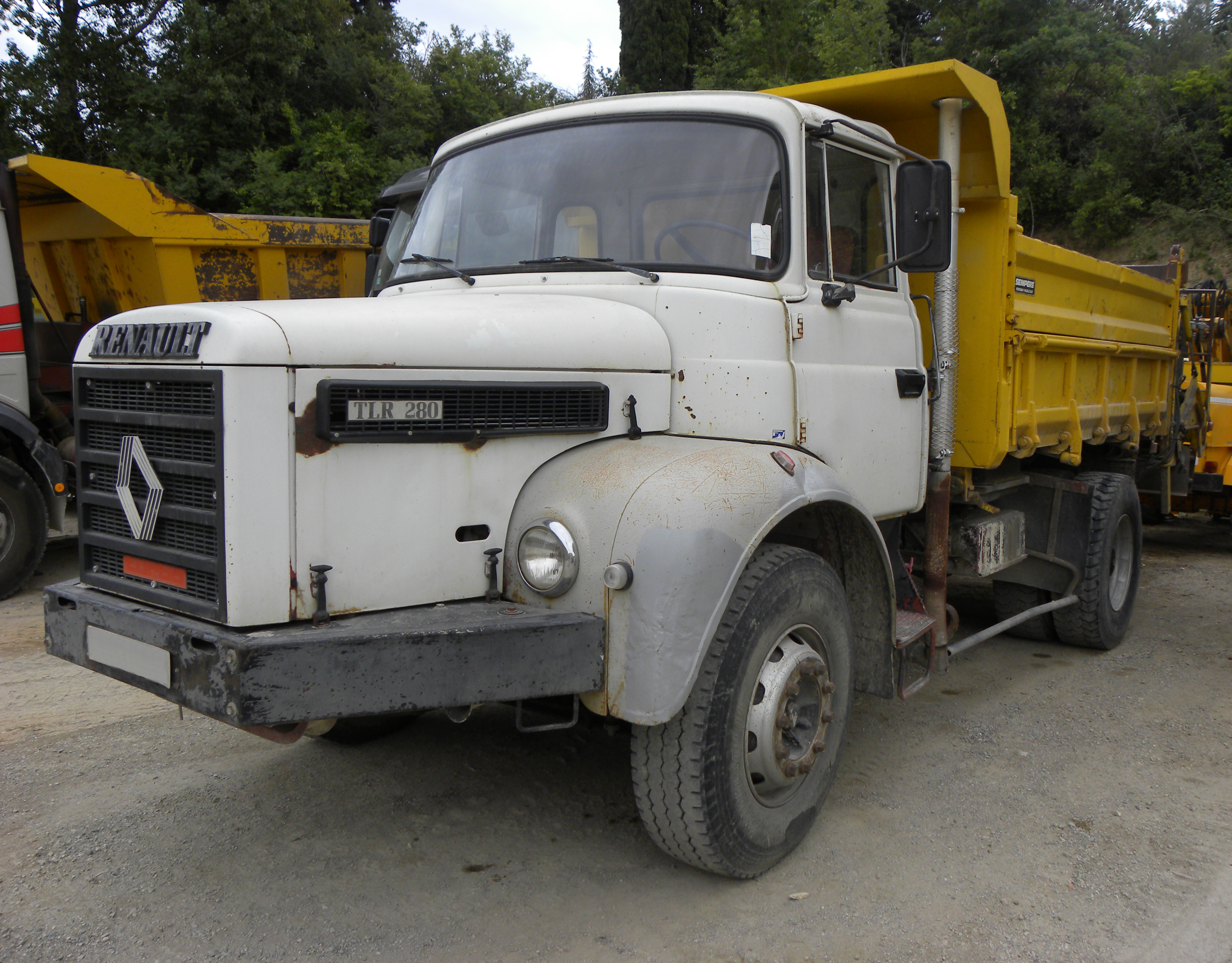
1980s Renault TLR
