= Berliet =

French automobile manufacturer

Automobiles M. Berliet
- Traded as: Automobiles M. Berliet SA (1917–1942); Berliet & Cie (1942–1944); Automobiles M. Berliet (1949–1974)
- Founded: 1899
- Founder: Marius Berliet
- Defunct: 1978
- Fate: Merged with Saviem into Renault Véhicules Industriels in 1978
- Successor: Renault Trucks
- Headquarters: Vénissieux, France
- Key people: Paul Berliet (son of founder)
- Products: Automobiles, buses, military vehicles, trucks
- Parent: Citroën (1967–1974); Renault (1974–1978)

Berliet was a French manufacturer of automobiles, buses, trucks and military vehicles among other vehicles based in Vénissieux, outside of Lyon, France. Founded in 1899, and apart from a five-year period from 1944 to 1949 when it was put into 'administration sequestre' it was in private ownership until 1967 when it then became part of Citroën, and subsequently acquired by Renault in 1974 and merged with Saviem into a new Renault Trucks company in 1978. The Berliet marque was phased out by 1980.

== Early history ==
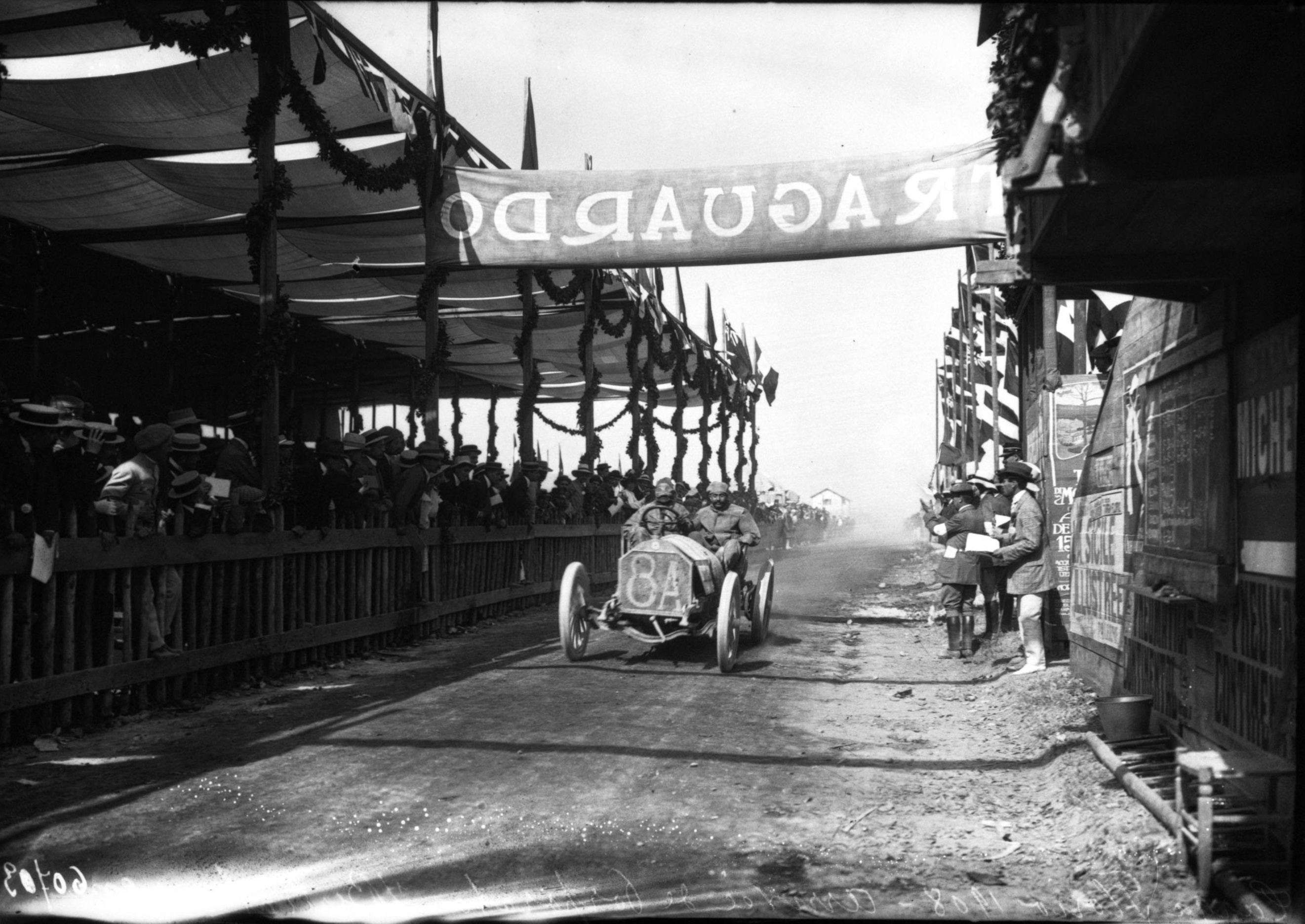
A racing-model Berliet driven by Jean Porporato in the 1908 Targa Florio race

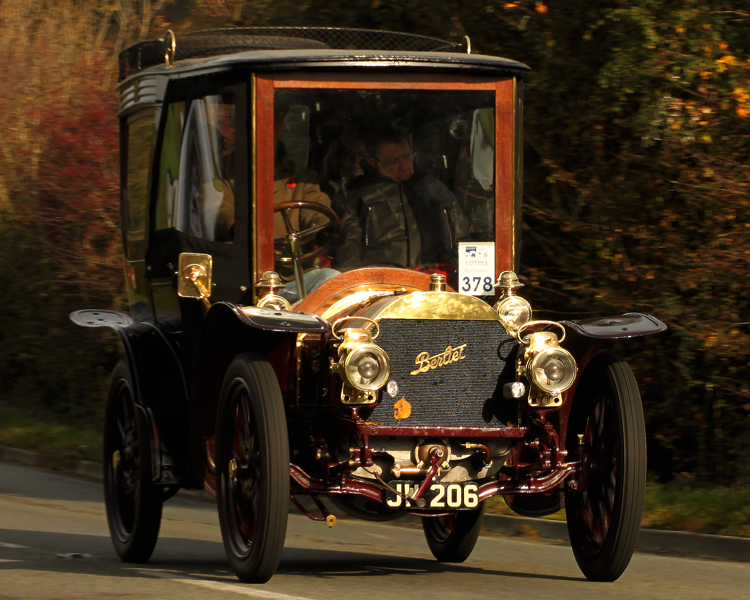
Berliet 20 HP Closed swing-seat tonneau 1903

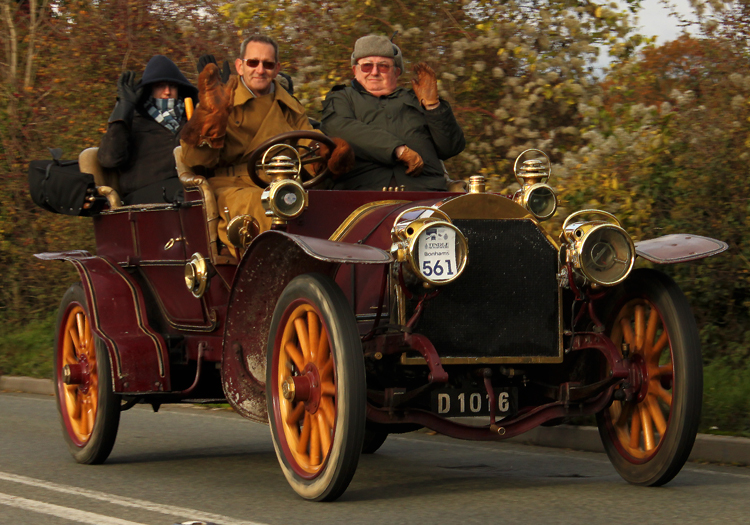
Berliet 40 HP Tourer 1904

Marius Berliet started his experiments with automobiles in 1894. Some single-cylinder cars were followed in 1900 by a twin-cylinder model. In 1902, Berliet took over the plant of Audibert & Lavirotte in Lyon. Berliet started to build four-cylinder automobiles featuring a honeycomb radiator, and a steel chassis frame was used instead of wood. The next year, a model was launched that was similar to contemporary Mercedes. In 1906, Berliet sold the licence for manufacturing his model to the American Locomotive Company.

Before World War I, Berliet offered a range of models from 8 HP to 60 HP. The main models had four-cylinder engines (2412 cc and 4398 cc, respectively), and there was a six-cylinder model of 9500 cc. A 1539 cc model (12 CV) was produced between 1910 and 1912. From 1912, six-cylinder models were made upon individual orders only.

== First World War ==
The First World War led to a massive increase in demand. Berliet, like Renault and Latil, produced trucks for the French army. The military orders placed major demands on the factory's capacity, necessitating major investment in production plant and factory space.

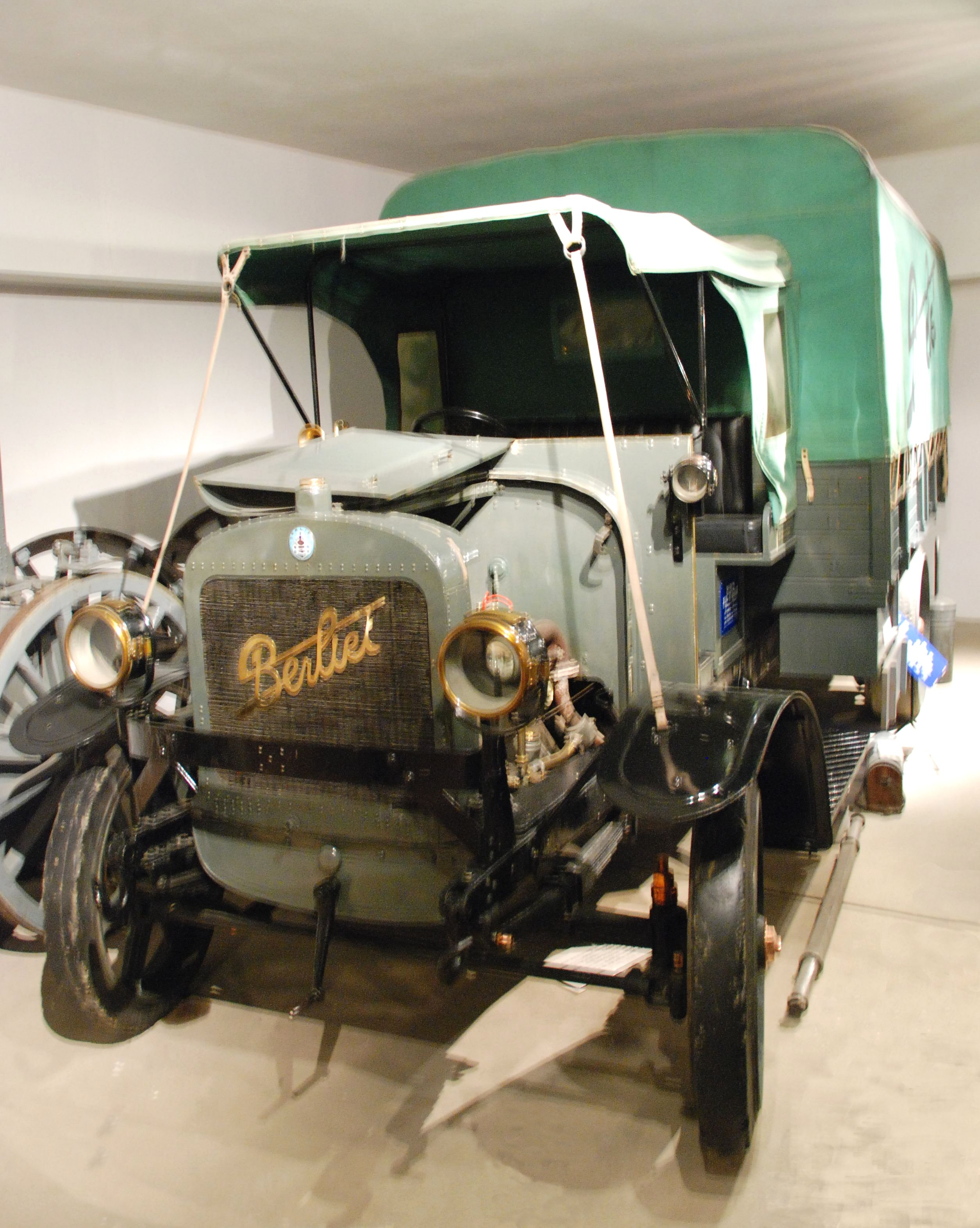
Berliet CBA at the Verdun Memorial museum. The CBA became the iconic truck on the Voie Sacrée, supplying the battle front at Verdun during 1916. It continued in production until 1932.

In 1915 a 400-hectare (990-acre) site was purchased between Vénissieux and Saint-Priest in order to build a new principal factory.

The Berliet CBA became the iconic truck on the Voie Sacrée, supplying the battle front at Verdun during 1916. 25,000 of these 4/5 ton Berliet trucks, originally launched in 1914, were ordered by the French army. During 1916 40 of them were leaving the plant each day. Under license from Renault, Berliet were also producing shells and battle tanks at this time. The number of workers employed increased to 3,150.

By 1917 the value of annual turnover had multiplied fourfold since the start of the war, and a new legal structure was deemed appropriate. The company became the Société anonyme des Automobiles Marius Berliet.

== Between two wars ==
After the war the manufacturer reoriented part of its production back to passenger cars, but Berliet nevertheless found themselves with excess capacity, as the army was no longer buying all the trucks the factory could produce, and overall output halved.

=== Shrinking the range ===
Marius Berliet responded to the outbreak of peace by deciding to produce just a single type of truck and a single type of car, which represented a departure from his pre-war market strategy. The single truck on which Berliet focused was the 5 ton CBA that had served the nation so well during the war.

=== An ill-judged short-cut ===
The passenger car to be produced, exhibited on the Berliet stand at the 15th Paris Motor Show in October 1919, was the 3296cc (15HP/CV) "Torpedo" bodied "Berliet Type VB" of modern appearance. Marius Berliet was not one to miss a trick: rather than devote time and engineering talent to developing a new car for the new decade, he obtained and copied an American Dodge. The Dodge was famously robust, and the Berliet copy was well received in March 1919 when it had its first public outing, locally, at the Lyon Trade Fair. The headlights were mounted unusually high and the simple disc wheels were large, giving the car a pleasing "no nonsense" look. Particularly attractive was the price of just 11,800 francs in October 1919. However, the Berliet engineers failed to ensure that the steel used in the car's construction was of the same quality as the North American steel used for the Dodge, and this resulted in serious problems for the early customers of the "Berliet Type VB" and serious reputational damage to the company.

=== Bankruptcy and recovery ===
The factory had been set up to produce the "Berliet Type VB" at the rate of 100 cars per day which would have been an ambitious target under any circumstances. The rapid drop-off in demand for what at this stage was the manufacturer's only passenger car model that followed the quality issues plunged the business into financial difficulties, with losses of 55 million francs recorded in one year. Survival was in doubt, and Berliet was placed in judicial administration in 1921. Marius Berliet himself had held 88% of the share capital, but was unable to pay off all the company's creditors and the firm therefore fell into the hands of the banks. Berliet was nevertheless able to retain operational control. During the ensuring decade, supported by a sustained recovery in demand that in turn reflected an effective model strategy after 1922, Berliet was able to pay off his debtors and, in 1929, to regain financial control over the business from the banks.

=== A full range for 1925 ===
By the middle of the decade the manufacturer was again exhibiting a full range of automobile models at the 1924 October Motor Show, although at this stage they all featured four cylinder engines including even the 3958cc "4-litre" with its impressive cylinder dimensions of 95 x 140 mm. The range for 1925 was as follows:

- "Type VI": Launched 1924 with a 1,160cc (7HP/CV) ohc engine. Wheelbase 2,800 mm (110.2 in)
  Listed prices Oct 1924: 16,260 francs (bare chassis), 21,500 francs (Torpedo), 25,500 francs (berline/saloon/sedan)
- "Type VRC" with a 2,603cc (12 HP/CV) sidevalve engine. Wheelbase 3,060 mm (120.5 in)
  Listed prices Oct 1924: 20,600 francs (bare chassis), 26,500 francs (Torpedo), 34,000 francs (berline/saloon/sedan)
- "Type VM" with a 3,296cc (16 HP/CV) sidevalve engine. Wheelbase 3,150 mm (124.0 in)
  Listed prices Oct 1924: 24,800 francs (bare chassis), 33,000 francs (Torpedo), 41,650 francs (berline/saloon/sedan)
- "Type VRK / 2½-litre" with a 2,480cc (16 HP/CV) ohv engine. Wheelbase 3,350 mm (131.9 in)
  Listed prices Oct 1924: 30,000 francs (bare chassis), 46,500 francs (Torpedo), 48,500 francs (berline/saloon/sedan)
- "Type VK" with a 3,958cc (18 HP/CV) ohv engine. Wheelbase 3,585 mm (141.1 in)
  Listed prices Oct 1924: 48,500 francs (bare chassis only)

From 1925 the manufacturer was producing its own car bodies.

=== Pushing up market ===
New six-cylinder models followed in 1927. By October 1928, just twelve months before the Wall Street crash crystallized a savage downturn for the western economies, three of the four cars offered for 1929 on the Berliet stand at the Paris Motor Show, were powered by six cylinder engines. The range for 1929 was as follows:

- "9CV": 1.5-litre 4-cylinder engine. Wheelbase 2,800 mm (110.2 in)
- "10CV": 1.8-litre 6-cylinder engine. Wheelbase 2,900 mm (114.2 in)
- "11CV": 2.0-litre 6-cylinder engine. Wheelbase 2,900 mm (114.2 in)
- "20CV": 4.0-litre 6-cylinder engine. Wheelbase 3,600 mm (141.7 in)

The largest of these, with its four-litre engine, was still listed by the manufacturer in March 1929, but was only available "to special order". However, by this time the manufacturer was also developing, for 1930, a "16CV" 2.8-litre six-cylinder model.

=== The 1930s ===
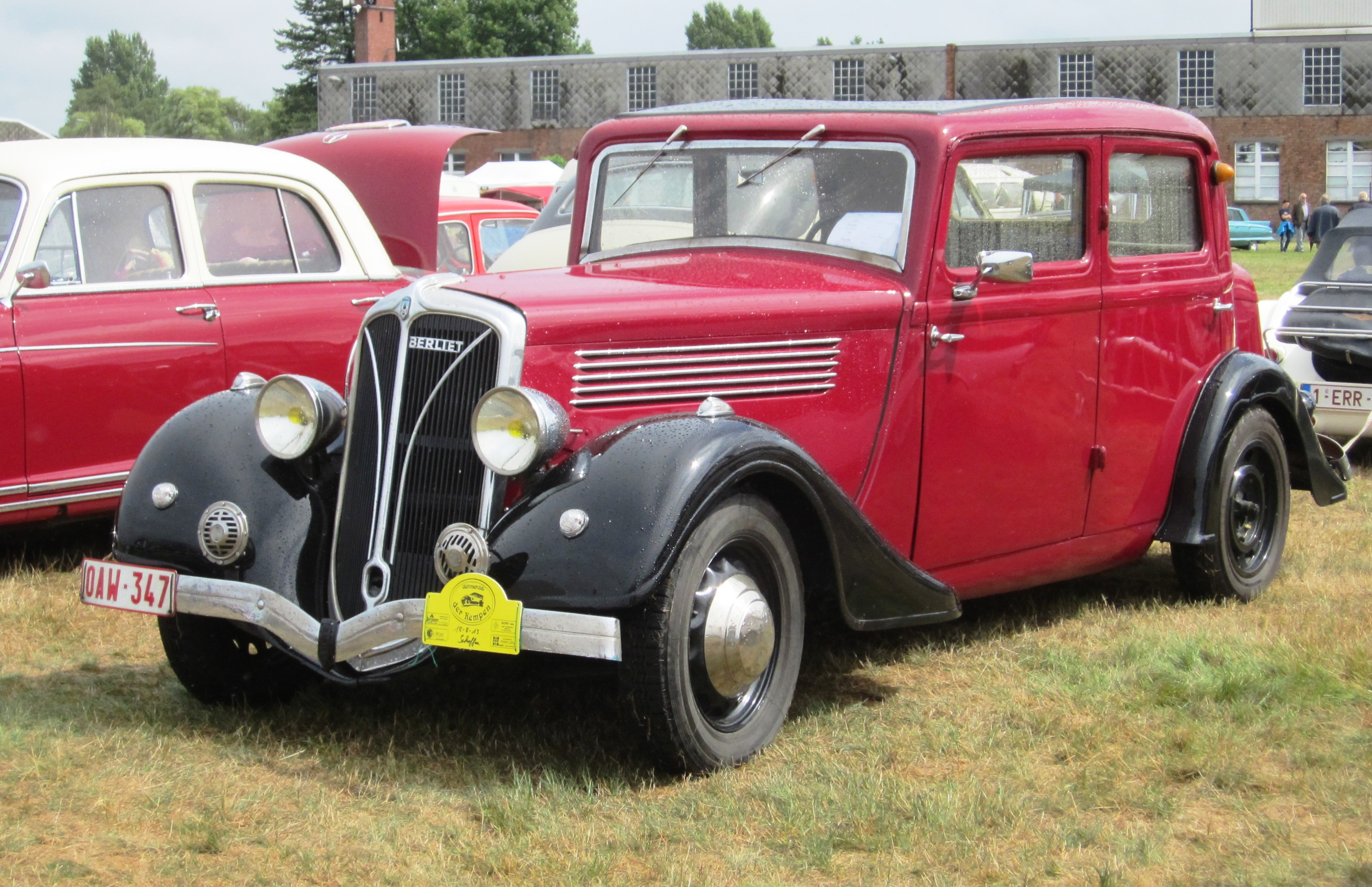
Berliet Dauphine 11CV (c. 1936)

In 1930 Berliet experimentally installed a diesel engine in one of their old CBA trucks, and in 1931 a batch of diesel powered Berliet GD2s was produced.

From 1933, only four-cylinder models (1600 cc and 2000 cc) were offered. The last new Berliet sedan was first exhibited at the Paris Motor Show in October 1933 but only launched in the summer of 1934. The new car received a proper name, and the Berliet Dauphine 11CV was powered by a 1,990 cc (11CV) engine. For 1939 Berliet stopped producing car bodies and the last few hundred Berliet Dauphines, produced in the first half of 1939, used the body of a Peugeot 402 with a custom-made Berliet hood/bonnet and radiator grille.

== Second World War and aftermath ==
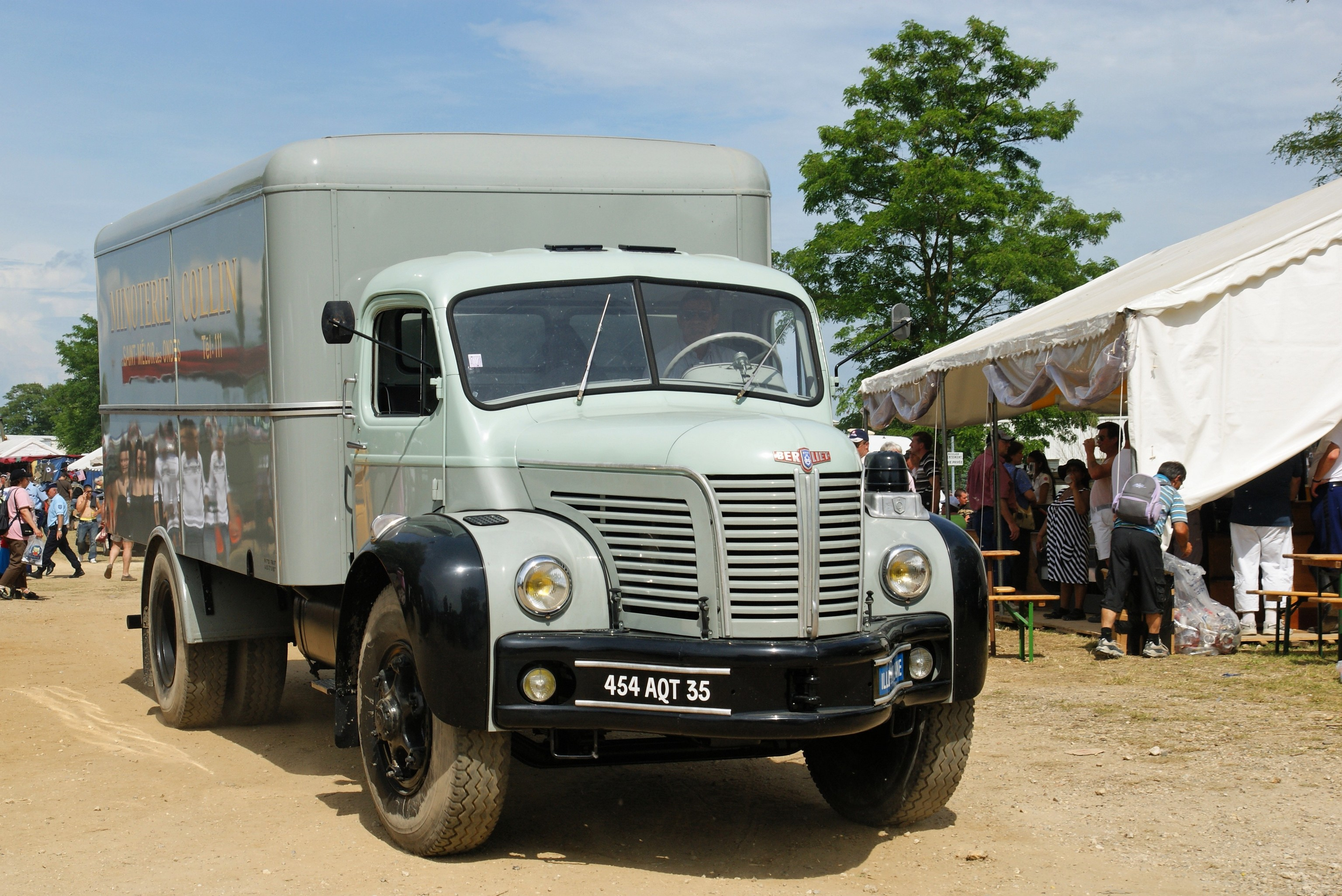
Berliet GLR

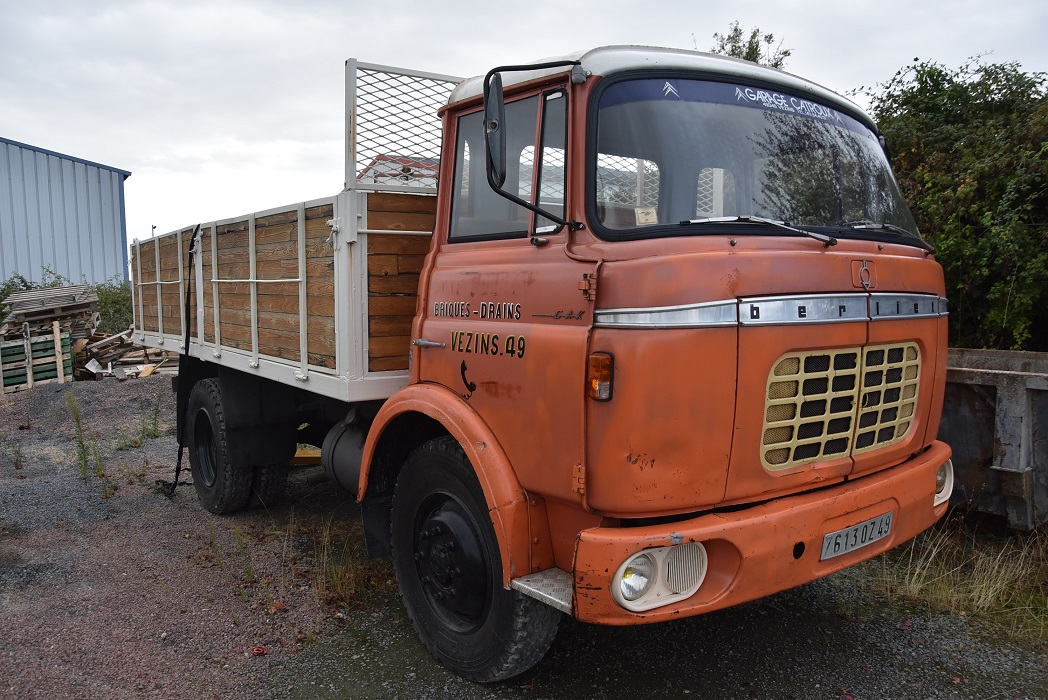
Berliet GAK, 1963 stack bed truck used in a brickyard

Regular passenger car production ceased in 1939 and after World War II, the company produced trucks only, with buses added to the range later. However, more than 20 brand-new sedans were in the factory when the Germans requisitioned it in June 1940, and these were immediately put into service. After the liberation, from late 1944 to early 1945, about 50 sedans were assembled from parts on hand, and in 1946, the last 15 sedans were completed by the Geneva agents. The company was given back to the family in 1949, but to Marius Berliet's son Paul following the founder's death earlier that year. The Berliet GLR truck became the first new post-war product.

In his 1975 book, Vichy France: old guard and new order: 1940-1944, Robert Paxton contrasted the fate of the Berliet truck factory in Lyon, which remained in Marius Berliet's family possession, despite his having manufactured 2,330 trucks for the Germans. — and the fate of Louis Renault's factories, which had also been seized — suggesting that the Renault factory might have been returned to Louis Renault and his family, had he lived longer. Marius Berliet, who died in 1949, had however "stubbornly refused to recognize legal actions against him after the war." As it happened, Renault's were the only factories permanently seized by the French government.

After a small start with diesel engines in 1931, Berliet (and their customers) gradually abandoned petrol engines. In 1963, only 234 of the 15,325 Berliet vehicles built still received petrol engines.

Berliet manufactured the largest truck in the world in 1957, the T100 6X6 with either 600 PS (441 kW; 592 hp) and 700 PS (515 kW; 690 hp) from a Cummins V12 engine. Available as a 6WD Dumptruck or 6X6 Roadtractor for Europe and North Africa it was designed in 10 months at the factory in Courbevoie, outside of Paris, with a second example built in 1958 and two further T100s built in 1959.

Later on a separate company called MOL Trucks of Hooglede, Belgium, bought the design rights of some original Berliet models of the 1970s and started to manufacture their own original MOL model range consisting of medium to large 4X4, 6X6 and 8X8 lorries and roadtractors. Their design and engineering was entirely based on selected former Berliet units.

== Citroën, Renault and demise ==
In August 1967, it was reported that Berliet had been taken over by Citroën, Berliet share holders receiving Citroën shares in return for their Berliet stock. In 1966, Berliet's final year as an independent, they had produced approximately 17,000 units. Following the take-over the merged company stated that Citroën-Berliet would command 58% of France's market for commercial vehicles above 6 tons. Citroën itself had been owned by Michelin since 1934 following a cash crisis of its own.

By this time, Michelin owned both Citroën and Berliet. However, after the 1973 oil crisis, Michelin decided to divest itself of these two companies in order to concentrate on its tire business. Thus, in 1974 Berliet was sold to Renault, while Citroën was sold to Peugeot. Renault then proceeded to merge Berliet with Saviem to form Renault Véhicules Industriels in 1978.

After the merger, the Berliet name was phased out and another French marque came to an end by the late 1970s, with the last Berliet bus in production, the 1971 PR100, continuing to be sold as a Renault until 1993. Other products that survived the merger include the 1973 VXB-170 4x4 armoured personnel carrier for the French Army and others. Another of Berliet's last projects was a six-cylinder light diesel engine, which entered production in 1977 and had become Renault V.I.'s 06.20 ("120 bore") engine by 1982.

== See also ==
- Missions Berliet-Ténéré
- SNVI, Algerian truck manufacturer using former Berliet assets in Algeria
