= List of pilots awarded an Aviator's Certificate by the Aéro-Club de France in 1910 =

The Aéro-Club de France issued Aviators Certificates from 1909. These were internationally recognised under the Fédération Aéronautique Internationale.

== List ==
Legend

- Individual was killed in an aviation accident.
- Individual was killed flying in military action.

Aéro-Club de France certificates awarded in 1910 (nos. 18–344)
| No. | Name | Date | Country of origin (if not France) | Comment |
|---|---|---|---|---|
| 18 | Mamet, Julien | 6 January 1910 | | d. in 1932. |
| 19 | Métrot, René | 6 January 1910 | | |
| 20 | Bibesco, Prince George Valentine | 6 January 1910 | Romania | 23 January 1910 |
| 21 | Aubrun, Emile Eugène | 6 January 1910 | | b. 26 August 1881 – d. 14 November 1967; Awarded Argentine certificate No.1 on 20 April 1910. |
| 22 | Balsan, Jacques (Colonel) | 6 January 1910 | | French industrialist, balloonist and pilot;d. 4 November 1956. |
| 23 | Rolls, Charles Stewart | 6 January 1910 | UK | Co-founder of Rolls-Royce company. UK Certificate no.2; d. in accident 12 July 1910. |
| 24 | Singer, Mortimer A. | 6 January 1910 | UK | UK Certificate no. 8; heir of Singer fortune |
| 25 | Molon, Léon | 6 January 1910 | | d. in 1952. |
| 26 | Brégi, Henri | 21 December 1909 | | KIA when shot and wounded by the crew of a German submarine in the Toulon area on 14 January 1917. |
| 27 | Lesseps, Comte Jacques de | 6 January 1910 | | On 21 May 1910 made the second ever crossing of the English Channel; d. 18 October 1927 while test-flying a Schreck flying boat near Gaspé, Canada; son of Ferdinand de Lesseps |
| 28 | Zens, Ernest | 15 January 1910 | | Balloonist, industrialist; KIA 12 September 1914 at Nomény. |
| 29 | Sommer, Roger | 15 January 1910 | | |
| 30 | Grahame-White, Claude | 4 January 1910 | UK | One of the best-known pioneers of aviation; d. in Nice 19 August 1959. |
| 31 | Efimoff, Michel | 15 February 1910 | Russia | Born 1 November 1881 at Smolensk, Russia; executed by firing-squad in the early days of the Russian revolution. |
| 32 | Chavez, Géo | 15 February 1910 | Peru | d. 27 September 1910 after an accident at Domodossola, Italy after the first aerial crossing of the Alps on 23 September 1910. |
| 33 | Camerman, Félix (Lieut.) | 8 March 1910 | | First French soldier to earn the Aviator's certificate; d. 29 December 1963. |
| 34 | Riemsdijk, Frederick Lodewijk van | 8 March 1910 | Netherlands | First Dutchman to hold a French aviator's certificate; d. March 1955. |
| 35 | Morelle, Edmond | 8 March 1910 | | |
| 36 | Deroche, Elise Raymonde (self-styled Baronne de la Roche) | 8 March 1910 | | First woman to achieve an aviator's certificate; d. as passenger on 18 July 1919 at Crotoy. |
| 37 | Born, Charles van den | 8 March 1910 | | Holder of Belgian certificate no. 6 (31 March 1910); chosen by Herny Farman to be the instructor at his flying school in Châlons; first person to fly in China (Hong Kong, Shanghai, Canton etc.) d. 24 January 1958. following an operation. He was born in 1873 and died in 1958. |
| 38 | Le Blon, Hubert | 8 March 1910 | | d. in accident 2 April 1910 San Sebastian (Spain). |
| 39 | Gasnier, René | 8 March 1910 | | d. 3 October 1913. |
| 40 | Moore-Brabazon, John Theodore Cuthbert | 8 March 1910 | UK | UK certificate no. 1, later 1st Baron Brabazon of Tara, one of the most prominent British aviation pioneers. |
| 41 | Herbster, Maurice | 8 March 1910 | | holder of Balloonist's certificate no. 175 (1911) and dirigible certificate no. 21 (1912) |
| 42 | Delétang, Fernand | 5 April 1910 | | d. in road accident 14 June 1928 at Avallon. |
| 43 | Crochon, André | 5 April 1910 | | |
| 44 | Burgeat, Médéric (Capt.) | 5 April 1910 | | |
| 45 | Bellenger, Georges-Marie (Lt.-Col.) | 5 April 1910 | | Served in both World Wars, reaching the rank of Lt.-Colonel; was active in the Resistance |
| 46 | Kuller, G.-P. | 5 April 1910 | Netherlands | |
| 47 | Dubonnet, Emile | 5 April 1910 | | In January 1912, Dubonnet broke the world distance record for a free balloon, flying 1,954 km from Paris, landing in Russia; d. 4 October 1950. |
| 48 | Frey, Alfred | 5 April 1910 | | d. in accident at Johannistal, near Berlin, in September 1910. (not to be confused with Andre Frey #93) |
| 49 | Baratoux, Marcel | 10 April 1910 | | Holder of Balloonist's certificate no. 177. |
| 50 | Popoff, Nicolas | 10 April 1910 | Russia | d. in accident 31 August 1912. |
| 51 | Wiesenbach, Vincent | 10 April 1910 | Luxemburg | d. in accident in Austria 11 June 1911. |
| 52 | Breguet, Louis | 19 April 1910 | | Aircraft manufacturer; d. 4 May 55. |
| 53 | Wachter, Charles | 19 April 1910 | | d. in accident when his aircraft suffered structural failure, 3 July 1910 at Bethany/Reims (France). |
| 54 | Morane, Léon | 19 April 1910 | | With his brother Robert Morane, and Raymond Saulnier, co-founder of aircraft manufacturers Morane-Saulnier; d. of Spanish Influenza 19 October 1918. |
| 55 | Legagneux, Georges | 19 April 1910 | | d. in accident 6 July 1914 at Saumur (France), crashing into the River Loire during a test flight. |
| 56 | Toussin, René | 19 April 1910 | | |
| 57 | Mollien, Elie Abel | 19 April 1910 | | |
| 58 | Mumm, Walter de | 19 April 1910 | Germany | Born in 1877 or 1887. Died in 1959. |
| 59 | Gaubert, Louis | 5 May 1910 | | d. 9 April 1959. |
| 60 | Rigal, Victor | 5 May 1910 | | |
| 61 | Jullerot, Henri | 5 May 1910 | | d. 31 October 1957. |
| 62 | Léon Cheuret | 5 May 1910 | | |
| 63 | Fequant, Albert | 5 May 1910 | | KIA 5 September 1915. |
| 64 | Barrier, René | 5 May 1910 | | died 13 November 1930. |
| 65 | Sido | 5 May 1910 | | KIA 1914. |
| 66 | Sallenave, Henri | 5 May 1910 | | d. in 1953. |
| 67 | Bruneau de Laborie | 5 May 1910 | | d. in 1931 in Bangui in what is now Central African Republic after a hunting accident |
| 68 | Acquaviva, Paul-Victor (Lieut.) | 5 May 1910 | | d. in 1944. |
| 69 | Montigny, Alfred de | 5 May 1910 | | |
| 70 | Sands, Hayden | 5 May 1910 | USA | New York Times entry for Hayden Sands |
| 71 | Dickson, Bertram (Captain) | 5 May 1910 | UK | Involved in first mid-air collision (with René Thomas) in Milan, Italy, 2 October 1910. d. 1913 |
| 72 | McArdle, W.E. | 19 April 1910 | UK | born 1875 d.1935 (wasn't killed in a crash) |
| 73 | Weiss, Henri | 2 May 1910 | | |
| 74 | Cederström, Carl Gustav Alexander | 2 May 1910 | Sweden | d. in accident 29 June 1918 in the Gulf of Bothnia. |
| 75 | Gilmour, Douglas Graham | 19 April 1910 | UK | d. in accident 17 February 1912 at Richmond (UK). |
| 76 | Mignot, Robert | 17 May 1910 | | |
| 77 | Didier, Adolphe | 17 May 1910 | | |
| 78 | Martinet, Robert Francois | 17 May 1910 | Peru | d. in accident at Micra airfield on the Salonica front 9 April 1917. |
| 79 | Tetard, Maurice | 17 May 1910 | | Born in 1879. |
| 80 | Marie, Félix (Capt.) | 17 May 1910 | | |
| 81 | Ladougne, Emile | 17 May 1910 | | |
| 82 | Gibbs, Launcelot | 10 June 1910 | UK | |
| 83 | Wagner, Louis | 10 June 1910 | | died in 1960. |
| 84 | Taurin, André | 10 June 1910 | | |
| 85 | Colliex, Maurice | 10 June 1910 | | Technical director and test pilot for Aéroplanes Voisin; d. 16 January 1955. |
| 86 | Labouchère, René | 10 June 1910 | Switzerland | Chief pilot at Potez in 1922. Born in 1890. Died in 1968. Probably related to Jacques Labouchere #344. |
| 87 | Bielovucic, Juan | 10 June 1910 | Peru | d. 14 January 1949. |
| 88 | Pequet, Henri | 10 June 1910 | | Worked for Morane-Saulnier as chief test pilot, later airport director at Vichy. died in March 1974. |
| 89 | Etévé, Albert Octave (General) | 10 June 1910 | | Invented the Etévé Anemometer. Born in 1881. Died in 1976. |
| 90 | Marconnet, Charles | 10 June 1910 | | KIA 22 December 1914. |
| 91 | Paul, Ernest | 10 June 1910 | | |
| 92 | Gibert, Louis, | 10 June 1910 | | |
| 93 | Frey, André | 10 June 1910 | | d. in accident 21 November 1912 at Reims/Mourmelon (France). No known relation to Alfred Frey (Allemagne or German) No. 48. |
| 94 | Champel, Florentin | 10 June 1910 | | |
| 95 | Hanriot, Marcel | 10 June 1910 | | Son of René Hanriot, no. 375; d. in March 1961. |
| 96 | Dufour, Jean | 10 June 1910 | | Born 1889 in Lille, Belgium. |
| 97 | Clolus (Commandant) | 10 June 1910 | | |
| 98 | Lebedeff, Wladimir | 10 June 1910 | Russia | d. Paris 22 February 1947. |
| 99 | Paillette, Marcel | 10 June 1910 | | |
| 100 | Audemars, Edmond | 10 June 1910 | Switzerland | Successful athlete (sprinter, racing cyclist); 6th pilot to succeed in "looping the loop"." |
| 101 | Blondeau, Gustave | 10 June 1910 | | |
| 102 | Gobé, Armand | 10 June 1910 | | |
| 103 | Dufour, Edmond | 10 June 1910 | | d. in 1939. |
| 104 | Niel, Albert | 10 June 1910 | | Born 1883 d. 6 January 1936. |
| 105 | Nieport, Édouard de | 10 June 1910 | | Co-founder of Nieuport aircraft company. d. in accident 15 September 1911 at Charny/Verdun. |
| 106 | Madiot, Louis Gabriel | 10 June 1910 | | d. in accident 23 October 1910 at La Brayelle nr. Douai (France). |
| 107 | Baeder, Ferdinand de | 21 June 1910 | | |
| 108 | Clement-Bayard, Maurice | 21 June 1910 | | Son of the founder of the Clément-Bayard company which designed and built bicycles, engines, automobiles, airships and aeroplanes. |
| 109 | Vallon, René | 21 June 1910 | | d. in accident 6 May 1911 at Shanghai (China). |
| 110 | Bathiat, Léon | 21 June 1910 | | Founder of Vieilles Tiges, d. 3 May 1967. |
| 111 | Laffont, Alexandre | 21 June 1910 | | d. in accident 20 December 1910 (with passenger Mario Pola) at Issy-les_Moulineaux (France). |
| 112 | Savary, Robert | 21 June 1910 | | |
| 113 | Hesne, Paul, Fils | 21 June 1910 | | |
| 114 | Noguès, Maurice | 21 June 1910 | | d. 15 January 1934 in the crash of the Dewoitine D.332 "Emeraude" at Corbigny, France. |
| 115 | Schwade, James | 21 June 1910 | | |
| 116 | Thomas, René | 21 June 1910 | | Racing driver, winner of 1914 Indianapolis 500. Involved in first mid-air collision (with Bertram Dickson) in Milan, Italy, 2 October 1910. d. 1975 |
| 117 | Granel, Marcel | 21 June 1910 | | KIA 11 January 1915. |
| 118 | Duval, Emile | 21 June 1910 | | d. 25 May 1956. |
| 119 | Daillens, Jean | 21 June 1910 | | born about 1881. |
| 120 | Bouvier, André | 21 June 1910 | | |
| 121 | Busson, Guillaume | 21 June 1910 | | d. 17 March 1958. |
| 122 | Noël, André | 21 June 1910 | | Born in 1867. |
| 123 | Mahieu, Georges | 21 June 1910 | | |
| 124 | Petrowsky, Alexandre de | 21 June 1910 | Russia | |
| 125 | Doroginskly, Stanislas | 21 June 1910 | Russia | |
| 126 | Loraine, Robert | 21 June 1910 | UK | |
| 127 | Ruchonnet, Emile | 1 July 1910 | Switzerland | d. 12 January 1912 at Vidamée nr. Senlis (France). |
| 128 | Tabuteau, Maurice | 1 July 1910 | | Born in 1884. died in 1976. |
| 129 | Verliac, Adrien | 1 July 1910 | | |
| 130 | Van Maasdyck, Clément | 1 July 1910 | Netherlands | Born in 1885. d. in accident 27 August 1910 at Arnhem (NL). |
| 131 | Maillols, Joseph | 1 July 1910 | | |
| 132 | Chevreau, René | 1 July 1910 | | |
| 133 | Vidart, René | 1 July 1910 | | |
| 134 | Lesseps, Paul de | 1 July 1910 | | |
| 135 | Chateau, Edouard | 19 July 1910 | | |
| 136 | Kuhling, Louis | 19 July 1910 | | |
| 137 | Bonnier, François-Xavier (General) | 19 July 1910 | | |
| 138 | Gronier, Jules | 19 July 1910 | | |
| 139 | Renaux, Eugène | 19 July 1910 | | d. 26 November 1955. |
| 140 | Gugnet, Gaston | 19 July 1910 | | |
| 141 | Bournique, Pierre-Marie | 19 July 1910 | | d. in accident 18 May 1911 at Reims. |
| 142 | Letheu | 19 July 1910 | | |
| 143 | Remy, Henri Charles (Lieut.) | 19 July 1910 | | d. in accident 5 November 1914. |
| 144 | Mauvais, Jean | 19 July 1910 | | |
| 145 | Basset | 19 July 1910 | | |
| 146 | Mailfert, Georges (Colonel) | 19 July 1910 | | |
| 147 | Garros, Roland | 19 July 1910 | | First aerial crossing of the Mediterranean 23 September 1913; fighter pilot, shot down 4 German aircraft; KIA 5 October 1918 (shot down and killed near Vouziers, Ardennes). |
| 148 | Obre, Emile | 19 July 1910 | | |
| 149 | Versepuy, Léon | 19 July 1910 | | d. in November 1954. |
| 150 | Beaud, Edouard | 19 July 1910 | | |
| 151 | Somerset, Somers | 19 July 1910 | UK | d. |
| 152 | Matyevitch-Matzeevitch, Bronislas | 19 July 1910 | Russia | d. in accident 1 May 1911 at Sebastopol. |
| 153 | Saunier | 9 August 1910 | | KIA. |
| 154 | Lucca, Désiré (Colonel ) | 9 August 1910 | | |
| 155 | Sanchez-Besa, José | 9 August 1910 | Chile | Born 1879 died 1954 |
| 156 | Caumont la Force, Jacques de (Lieut.) | 9 August 1910 | | d. in accident 30 December 1910 at Saint Cyr. |
| 157 | Mouthier, Louis | 9 August 1910 | | |
| 158 | Devaulx, Robert (Lieutenant) | 9 August 1910 | | d. in accident 2 September 1913 |
| 159 | Chemet, Géo | 9 August 1910 | | KIA. |
| 160 | Chassagne, Jean | 9 August 1910 | | |
| 161 | Perin, Albert | 9 August 1910 | | |
| 162 | Martin, Xavier | 9 August 1910 | | |
| 163 | Chailley, Henri | 9 August 1910 | | |
| 164 | Picard, Pierre | 9 August 1910 | | |
| 165 | Hugoni, Edouard | 9 August 1910 | | d. 14 March 1947. |
| 166 | Molla, Michel-Paul | 9 August 1910 | | d. in 1951. |
| 167 | Train, Émile | 9 August 1910 | | |
| 168 | Mahieu, Michel | 9 August 1910 | | KIA 2 May 1918. |
| 169 | Prier, Pierre | 9 August 1910 | Chief instructor at the Blériot flying school at Hendon and designer of the Bristol-Prier monoplane. | d. in 1950. |
| 170 | Letort, Léon | 9 August 1910 | | d. in accident 10 December 1913 nr. Bordeaux (France). |
| 171 | Barra, Franck | 9 August 1910 | | |
| 172 | Molla, Henri | 9 August 1910 | | |
| 173 | Balensi, Albert (Captain) | 9 August 1910 | | |
| 174 | Vullierme | 9 August 1910 | | |
| 175 | Byasson, Louis-Édouard L/V | 9 August 1910 | | d. in accident 14 April 1911 at Coignieres nr. Buc (France). |
| 176 | Lesire, Eugène | 9 August 1910 | | |
| 177 | Simon, René (Captain) | 9 August 1910 | | |
| 178 | Matziewitch, Leon (Captain) | 9 August 1910 | Russia | d. in accident 7 October 1910 at Saint Petersburg. |
| 179 | Parisot, Leon | 9 August 1910 | | d. in accident. |
| 180 | Caudron, René | 29 August 1910 | Founder of the Caudron aircraft company | d. 27 September 1959. |
| 181 | Oulianine, Serge | 29 August 1910 | Russia | |
| 182 | Poillot, Edmond | 29 August 1910 | | d. in accident 25 September 1910 at Chartres (France). |
| 183 | Weiss, Gustave | 29 August 1910 | | d. 11 November 1955. |
| 184 | Robillard, Georges Comte de | 29 August 1910 | | d. in accident 4 May 1912 in Nice (France). |
| 185 | Dufour, Louis | 29 August 1910 | | |
| 186 | Gournay, Henri | 29 August 1910 | | |
| 187 | Sée, Raymond | 29 August 1910 | | d. in accident. |
| 188 | Glorieux, Léon | 29 August 1910 | | |
| 189 | Parent, François | 29 August 1910 | | |
| 190 | Paris-Leclerc, Max | 29 August 1910 | | d. 17 November 1953. |
| 191 | Zaifine, Jean | 29 August 1910 | | |
| 192 | André, Claude | 29 August 1910 | | |
| 193 | Baugnies, Jean-Bernard-Eugène | 29 August 1910 | | d. 8 September 1935. |
| 194 | Lafon, Charles | 29 August 1910 | | |
| 195 | Piotrowsky, Grégoire | 29 August 1910 | Poland | d. 29 March 1913 in Warsaw (Poland). |
| 196 | Duperron | 29 August 1910 | | |
| 197 | Girard, Justin | 29 August 1910 | | KIA 24 March 1916. |
| 198 | Kauffmann, Paul | 29 August 1910 | | d. 4 April 1959. |
| 199 | Menard, Paul (Colonel) | 29 August 1910 | | d. 13 April 1954. |
| 200 | Caille, Albert | 29 August 1910 | | |
| 201 | Florencie, Jean | 29 August 1910 | | |
| 202 | Joliot, André | 29 August 1910 | | |
| 203 | Koechlin, Jean Paul | 29 August 1910 | | killed in France in 1916 during WW1. |
| 204 | Langhe, Armand de | 29 August 1910 | | |
| 205 | Bill, Henri | 29 August 1910 | | Test pilot for Farman. |
| 206 | Reymond, Émile | 29 August 1910 | | KIA 2 October 1914. |
| 207 | Raygorodski, Abram | 29 August 1910 | | |
| 208 | Wynmalen, Henri | 29 August 1910 | | Born in 1889. Died in 1964. |
| 209 | Malynski, Emmanuel de | 29 August 1910 | | |
| 210 | Kebouroff, Vissarlon | 29 August 1910 | Georgia | 1870–1958 |
| 211 | Scipio del Campo, Michel | 29 August 1910 | | |
| 212 | Melly, Henry G. | 29 August 1910 | UK | |
| 213 | Harding, Howard J. | 29 August 1910 | UK | |
| 214 | Archer, Ernest | 29 August 1910 | UK | |
| 215 | Blanchard, Fernand | 29 August 1910 | | d. in accident 26 October 1910 at Issy les Moulineaux. |
| 216 | Guée, Albert | 29 August 1910 | | |
| 217 | Visseaux, Henry-Jean | 29 August 1910 | France | d. in 1949 |
| 218 | Servies, JuIes | 29 August 1910 | | |
| 219 | Delage, Gustave | 29 August 1910 | | |
| 220 | Yence, Raymond | 29 August 1910 | | |
| 221 | Cordonnier, Robert | 29 August 1910 | | d. in accident 9 June 1932 at Denain. |
| 222 | Labouret, René | 29 August 1910 | | |
| 223 | Kostine, Nicolas | 29 August 1910 | | |
| 224 | Loridan, Marcel | 29 August 1910 | | |
| 225 | Wassilieff de | 29 August 1910 | Russia | |
| 226 | Niel, Marthe | 4 October 1910 | | d. in December 1928. |
| 227 | Kousminski de | 4 October 1910 | | d. in accident 30 May 1914 at Odessa. |
| 228 | Gaudard, Louis | 19 September 1910 | | d. in accident 15 April 1913, Monaco. |
| 229 | Meyer, Jules Maurice | 19 September 1910 | | |
| 230 | Lipkowski, Henri de | 19 September 1910 | Russia | |
| 231 | Smith, Waldemar William | 19 September 1910 | UK | d. in accident 27 May 1911 at Saint Petersburg. |
| 232 | Binda, Léon | 4 October 1910 | | |
| 233 | Cheutin, Etienne-Jean (General) | 4 October 1910 | | |
| 234 | Molon, Louis | 4 October 1910 | | |
| 235 | Molon, Lucien | 4 October 1910 | | d. 7 July 1957. |
| 236 | Baillod, Louis | 4 October 1910 | | |
| 237 | Bathiat, Georges | 4 October 1910 | | |
| 238 | Marquezy, René | 4 October 1910 | | |
| 239 | Hainaux, Marcel | 4 October 1910 | | |
| 240 | Gilbert, Eugene | 4 October 1910 | | d. in accident 16 May 1918 at Villacoublay. |
| 241 | Lombardi, Henri | 4 October 1910 | | |
| 242 | Cure, Gaston | 4 October 1910 | | |
| 243 | Deve | 4 October 1910 | | |
| 244 | Blanchet, Georges | 4 October 1910 | | |
| 245 | Komaroff, Michel | 4 October 1910 | | |
| 246 | Laurens, Ernest | 4 October 1910 | | |
| 247 | Hautefeuille | 4 October 1910 | | |
| 248 | Boivin, Albert | 4 October 1910 | | |
| 249 | Lemartin, Théodore | 4 October 1910 | | d. in accident 18 June 1911 at Vincennes (France). |
| 250 | Chioni, Basile | 4 October 1910 | | |
| 251 | Gaye, Georges | 4 October 1910 | | d. 3 January 1952. |
| 252 | Algrin, René | 1 October 1910 | | d. November 1932. |
| 253 | Junod, Auguste | 4 October 1910 | | d. 30 August 1927. |
| 254 | Derny, Léon | 4 October 1910 | | |
| 255 | Ludmann, Gaston (General) | 4 October 1910 | | |
| 256 | Orus, Maurice | 4 October 1910 | | |
| 257 | Harle, André | 4 October 1910 | | |
| 258 | Hammond, Joe J. | 4 October 1910 | NZ/UK | d. |
| 259 | Esterre, Charles d' | 4 October 1910 | UK | |
| 260 | Burke, C. J. (Capt.) | 4 October 1910 | UK | |
| 261 | Blard | 19 October 1910 | | |
| 262 | Morel, Pierre | 19 October 1910 | | d. in September 1914. |
| 263 | Begue, Jean | 19 October 1910 | | |
| 264 | Jost, René (Capt.) | 19 October 1910 | | d. 30 March 1912 after accident in February 1912 at Étampes. |
| 265 | Grezaud, Pierre (Lt.-Col.) | 19 October 1910 | | d. in 1953. |
| 266 | Jamblez, Paul | 19 October 1910 | | |
| 267 | Chatain, Marius | 19 October 1910 | | |
| 268 | Barbotte, Ernest | 19 October 1910 | | |
| 269 | Vallier, Edmond | 19 October 1910 | | d. in accident in September 1914. |
| 270 | Felix, Julien (Commandant) | 19 October 1910 | | d. in accident 16 June 1914 Chartres (France). |
| 271 | Bachot, Anastase | 19 October 1910 | | |
| 272 | Paul, Edmond A. | 19 October 1910 | UK | |
| 273 | Zelinsky, Michel de | 8 November 1910 | | |
| 274 | Duflot, Eugène | 8 November 1910 | | d. 11 March 1957 at Pau. |
| 275 | Balaye, Auguste | 8 November 1910 | | |
| 276 | Beard, Pierre | 8 November 1910 | | Born in 1893. Died in 1966. |
| 277 | Briançon, Lucien | 8 November 1910 | | |
| 278 | Lafargue, Henri | 8 November 1910 | | |
| 279 | Collin, Georges | 8 November 1910 | | |
| 280 | Bresson, Georges | 8 November 1910 | | |
| 281 | Marvingt, Marie | 8 November 1910 | | d. in Nancy 14 December 1963. |
| 282 | Vasseur, Narcisse | 8 November 1910 | | |
| 283 | Boise de Courcenay, Edmond de | 8 November 1910 | | |
| 284 | Goffin, Marcel | 8 November 1910 | | |
| 285 | Villeneuve Trans, Louis de | 8 November 1910 | | d. 26 May 1957. |
| 286 | Charpentier, Louis | 8 November 1910 | | |
| 287 | Cames, Mario-Garcia | 8 November 1910 | | |
| 288 | Romance, François de | 8 November 1910 | | |
| 289 | Yoshitoshi Tokugawa | 8 November 1910 | | |
| 290 | Koolhoven, Frederick | 8 November 1910 | Netherlands | Rally driver, aircraft designer and manufacturer. |
| 291 | Kijmmerling, Albert | 8 November 1910 | | d. (with his engineer Tonnet) in accident 9 June 1912 at Mourmelon (France). |
| 292 | Studensky, Paul | 23 November 1910 | | |
| 293 | Lusetti, Archimède | 23 November 1910 | | |
| 294 | Clavenad, Pierre (Captain) | 23 November 1910 | | d. in accident. |
| 295 | Bousquet, Paul | 23 November 1910 | | KIA. |
| 296 | Chatain, Louis | 28 November 1910 | | |
| 297 | Bellier, Albert | 23 November 1910 | | |
| 298 | Tenaud, Charles | 23 November 1910 | | died 7 September 1911. |
| 299 | Piccolo, Giulio | 23 November 1910 | Italy | Holder of Italian certificate no. 28b; d. in accident 25 December 1910 at São Paulo (Brazil). |
| 300 | Wintrebert, Henri | 23 November 1910 | | |
| 301 | Pascal, Ferdinand | 23 November 1910 | | d. 1956. |
| 302 | Gaulard, Charles | 23 November 1910 | | d. in 1953. |
| 303 | Boyer, Louis | 7 December 1910 | | |
| 304 | Valleton, Alfred | 7 December 1910 | | d. in 1952. |
| 305 | Garnier, Léonce | 7 December 1910 | | |
| 306 | Morin, Roger | 7 December 1910 | | |
| 307 | Barillon, Pierre-Paul | 7 December 1910 | | d. 3 September 1912. |
| 308 | D'Aiguillon, Roger d' | 7 December 1910 | | |
| 309 | Bobba, André | 7 December 1910 | | KIA in 1916. |
| 310 | Colomb, Henri | 7 December 1910 | | |
| 311 | Perreyon, Edmond | 7 December 1910 | | d. in accident 25 November 1913. |
| 312 | Védrines, Jules | 7 December 1910 | | Winner of Gordon Bennett Trophy race in 1912., d. while attempting to fly from Paris to Rome 21 April 1919. |
| 313 | Gaubert, Edmond | 7 December 1910 | | |
| 314 | Normand | 7 December 1910 | | |
| 315 | Vigne, Henri Victorin | 7 December 1910 | | |
| 316 | Schumberger, Maurice | 7 December 1910 | | KIA. |
| 317 | Bellot, André | 7 December 1910 | | |
| 318 | Herveux, Jane | 7 December 1910 | | d. 15 January 1955. |
| 319 | Planchut, Edmond | 7 December 1910 | | |
| 320 | Lecomte, Henri | 7 December 1910 | | Killed in action 24 September 1916 while CO of escadrille C.42> |
| 321 | Level, René | 7 December 1910 | | d. 14 October 1911 following accident on 12 October 1911 at Reims (France). |
| 322 | Conneau, Jean | 7 December 1910 | | d. 10 August 1937 at Lodève. |
| 323 | Lutge, Frits | 7 December 1910 | | |
| 324 | Eristov, Prince Vladimir | 8 November 1910 | | |
| 325 | Maslenikof, Boris | 7 December 1910 | Bulgaria | |
| 326 | Semeniouk, Ignace | 23 November 1910 | Russia | |
| 327 | Lewkowicz, Ladis | 23 November 1910 | | d. 16 April 1939. |
| 328 | Marchal, Anselme | 23 November 1910 | Switzerland | d. 26 June 1921. |
| 329 | Gounouilhou, André | 23 November 1910 | | |
| 330 | Tricornot de Rose, Charles (Commandant) | 23 November 1910 | | KIA. |
| 331 | Princeteau, Pierre (Lieut. ) | 23 November 1910 | | d. in accident 18 June 1911 at Issy-les-Moulineaux (France). |
| 332 | Noël, Jules | 23 November 1910 | | d. in accident 9 February 1911 at Douzy/Douai (France). |
| 333 | Chevalier, Louis | 23 November 1910 | | |
| 334 | Malherbe, René Marie Pierre de (Lt.- Col.) | 23 November 1910 | | d. 11 May 1931 at Villacoublay. |
| 335 | Gaget, Joseph | 23 November 1910 | | |
| 336 | Sismanoglou, Jean | 23 November 1910 | | KIA 15 June 1915. |
| 337 | Bague, Edouard-Jean (Lieut.) | 23 November 1910 | | Disappeared 5 June 1911 while attempting to cross to Mediterranean Sea, near Corsica. |
| 338 | Van Gaver, Paul | 23 November 1910 | | |
| 339 | Miltgen, Paul | 23 November 1910 | | |
| 340 | Féquant, Philippe (General) | 23 November 1910 | | d. 28 December 1938. |
| 341 | Joly, | 23 November 1910 | | |
| 342 | Vialard, Charles, | 23 November 1910 | | |
| 343 | Gallie, Fernand | 23 November 1910 | | KIA. |
| 344 | Labouchère, Jacques | 23 November 1910 | | probably related to Rene Labouchere #86 |

== See also ==
- Early Birds of Aviation

Lists for other years

- 1909
- 1911
- 1912
- 1913
- 1914

== Bibliography ==
- "Aviation Victims Now Number 100" (PDF). New York Times. 15 October 1911. pp. 1, 8.
- "Aviation History – Browse the History of Flight since 1909". Flightglobal/Archive. Reed Business Information.
- "Flying Pioneers – Vieilles Tiges". Early pioneers list. Past and Present.
- "Grace's Guide" (wiki). The Best of British Engineering. 1750 to 1960s. Grace's Guide.
- Lam, Dave. "Aircraft Deaths – Fixed Wing Only to August 1914" (PDF). Early Aviators.
- Lassalle, Émile Jean. "Les cent premiers aviateurs brevetés au monde" (php). Aviatechno.
- Moulin, Jacques (2009). "Le Journal de l'Aérophile!". Liste Alphabétique des pilotes aviateurs brevetés en France avant le 2 août 1914. Archived from the original on 9 December 2010.
