= List of pilots awarded an Aviator's Certificate by the Aéro-Club de France in 1909 =

The Aéro-Club de France issued Aviators Certificates from 1 January 1910 on. These were internationally recognised under the authority of the Fédération Aéronautique Internationale.

Following a suggestion by Georges Besançon, the secretary of the Ae.C.F., the first eight French aviator's licences were awarded retrospectively dated on 7 January 1909 to Louis Blériot, Leon Delagrange, Robert Esnault-Pelterie, Henry Farman, Alberto Santos-Dumont, Captain Ferdinand Ferber and Orville and Wilbur Wright. These aviation pioneers had amply demonstrated their abilities and they were therefore not required to pass a test in order to receive a licence. Further licences were awarded on 17 August to Hubert Latham and Louis Paulhan, on 16 September to Paul Tissandier, on 7 October 1909 to Jean Gobron, Charles de Lambert and Glenn Curtiss, and on 18 November to Maurice Farman and Henri Rougier.

The first sixteen licences were retrospectively numbered in alphabetical order, with Blériot receiving licence No. 1 and Wilbur Wright receiving No. 15 (No. 13 was not awarded, and numbers 5 (Note: 5-bis was allocated to keep the original list of honorary awards in alphabetical order) and 10 (Note: Tissander was original allocated No. 13 but this was changed to 10-bis due to Triskaidekaphobia) were duplicated)

== List ==
Legend

- Individual was killed in an aviation accident.
- Individual was killed flying in military action.

Aéro-Club de France certificates awarded in 1909 (nos. 1–17)
No.	Name	Date	Country of origin (if not France)	Comment
1	Bleriot, Louis	7 January 1909		First pilot to cross the English Channel in a heavier-than-air aircraft; d. 1 August 1936.
2	Curtiss, Glenn	7 October 1909	USA	Holder of Aero Club of America certificate no. 1; d. 23 July 1930 in Florida.
3	Delagrange, Léon	7 January 1909		d. in accident 4 January 1910 at Croix-d’Hins, nr. Bordeaux.
4	Esnault-Pelterie, Robert	7 January 1909		Inventor, aircraft designer, rocket propulsion theorist, founder of R.E.P.; d. 6 December 1957.
5	Farman, Henry	7 January 1909	UK	Anglo-French aviation pioneer and entrepreneur; adopted French nationality 1937; d. 17 July 1958.
5 bis	Ferber, Ferdinand (Captain)	7 January 1909		d. in accident 22 September 1909 at Boulogne sur Mer (France). Certificate awarded posthumously as a sign of respect, hence the unusual numbering.
6	Farman, Maurice	18 November 1909	UK	Anglo-French aviation pioneer and entrepreneur; d. 25 February 1964 at Paris.
7	Gobron, Jean	7 October 1909		d. 26 July 1945 in a road accident.
8	Lambert, Comte Charles de	7 October 1909	Russia	Russian pilot of French origins; d. 26 February 1944.
9	Latham, Hubert	17 August 1909		d. in hunting accident in Africa 7 June 1912.
10	Paulhan, Louis	17 August 1909		d. 10 February 1963.
10 bis	Tissandier, Paul	16 September 1909		Son of famous balloonist Gaston Tissandier. d. 11 March 1945. Originally planned to be number 13, changed to 10-b out of superstition.
11	Rougier, Henri	18 November 1909		d. July 1956.
12	Santos-Dumont, Alberto	7 January 1909	Brazil	Balloonist, airship pioneer and designer: made the first flight verified by the Aéro-Club de France of a powered heavier-than-air machine in Europe.
14	Wright, Orville	7 January 1909	USA	US aviation pioneer; d. in Dayton, Ohio, 30 January 1948, aged 76.
15	Wright, Wilbur	7 January 1909	USA	US aviation pioneer; d. 30 May 1912 of typhoid fever at Dayton (USA).
16	Bunau-Varilla, Etienne	4 November 1909		Son of Philippe-Jean Bunau-Varilla; patented first recumbent bicycle (1912) d. 12 December 1961.
17	Leblanc, Alfred	16 December 1909		Organised logistics for Louis Blériot's cross-channel flight, later chief instructor at Blériot flying school. d. 22 November 1921.

== See also ==
- Early Birds of Aviation

Lists for other years

- 1910
- 1911
- 1912
- 1913
- 1914

== Bibliography ==
- Eighty-Six Certified Flight PilotsFlight,28 May 1910 p. 408.
- Lam, Dave. "Aircraft Deaths - Fixed Wing Only to August 1914" (PDF). Early Aviators.
- Lassalle, Émile Jean. "Les cent premiers aviateurs brevetés au monde" (php). Aviatechno.
- Moulin, Jacques (2009). "Le Journal de l'Aérophile!". Liste Alphabétique des pilotes aviateurs brevetés en France avant le 2 août 1914. Archived from the original on 9 December 2010.
