= Frank Schoeber =

American aviator

Frank Schoeber (1891-1970) was an American aviator.

Schoeber was a pioneer of early aviation. In August 1912, he solo piloted an aircraft in Mineola, New York. His solo flights earned him a bronze medal from the Early Birds of Aviation. Until 1923, he worked building planes, including for large companies and the United States Armed Forces.

Schoeber was born in New York City on April 21, 1891. He had two sisters. He later married and had two daughters. Following a stroke in 1961, he died on July, 19, 1970, in Cape May, New Jersey.
