= Thérèse Peltier =

French sculptor and aviator

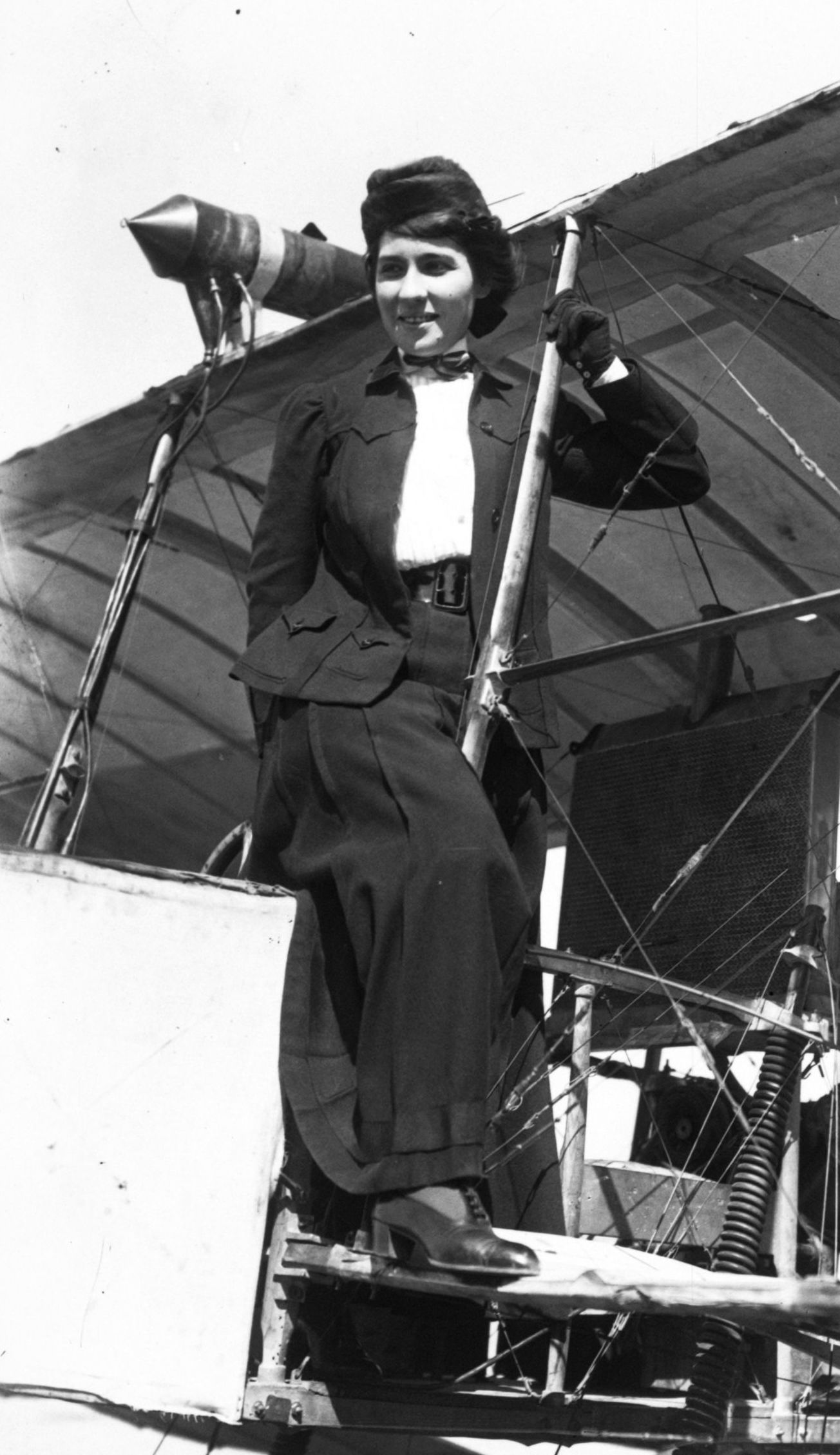
- Thérèse Peltier in 1908
- Born: Thérèse Juliette Cochet; September 26, 1873; Orléans, Loiret, France
- Died: February 18, 1926 (aged 52); Paris, France
- Known for: Aviation, Sculpture

Thérèse Peltier (September 26, 1873 – February 18, 1926), born Thérèse Juliette Cochet, was a French sculptor and early aviation pioneer. Popularly believed to have been the first ever female passenger in an airplane, she may also have been the first woman to pilot an aircraft. A friend of fellow sculptor Léon Delagrange, when he became interested in aviation Peltier soon followed.

== Early life and career ==
Thérèse Peltier was born the daughter of a liquor distiller on September 26, 1873, in Orléans Loiret, France. In 1893, she married Marine doctor Alfred Peltier of Paris, where she resided for most of her life. Peltier began to take sculpture lessons and exhibit in numerous salons. In 1908 she received the sculpture prize from the Union of Women Painters and Sculptors, which was the first society of female artists in France. Peltier specialized in wax sculpture and was included along with Delagrange and a group of other wax sculptors in a 1902 profile in The Literary Digest.

== Aviation ==
On 8 July 1908 in Turin, Peltier flew as a passenger with Delagrange for a distance of 200 metres (656 feet). She is widely believed to have been the first female passenger on an airplane; however Henri Farman is reported to have flown or tried to fly with a Mlle P. Van Pottelsberghe in Ghent, Belgium in late May. Delagrange taught Peltier how to fly his Voisin 1907 biplane and she completed a number of solo flights, although she never earned her pilot's license. After a few training sessions, she flew alone for the first time in Issy-le-Moulineaux. The feat was recounted in L'Aérophile:

The passenger was not illegal and, in the space of a flight, she became famous: Thérèse Peltier can be proud to be the first woman in the world to have taken to the skies… Four months ago in Issy-le-Moulineaux, Delagrange had embarked alongside his friend Henri Farman. Two men in the same ‘zinc,’ we had screamed madly. With a woman, we shout at the feat.

Also in 1908, Peltier accompanied Delagrange on his successful record attempt for flight duration, during which he flew 30 minutes and 28 seconds. She also joined him on a series of Italian flight exhibitions in Turin and Rome, which she reported on for the French newspapers. During this tour, she made a solo flight of 200 metres (656 feet) at a height of 2.5 metres (8.2 ft) at the Military Square in Turin. The date of this flight is unknown, but it was reported in the weekly Italian magazine L'Illustrazione Italiana as 27 September 1908.

In late 1908, Delagrange offered a prize of 100 francs for the first woman aviator to pilot a plane for one kilometre (0.62 mi). Peltier reportedly began training to compete for the prize, but when Delagrange died in an airplane accident, on 4 January 1910 at Bordeaux, she left aviation forever. She wrote to Henri Deutsch-de-la Meurthe, a supporter of early aviation:

I am mired in my sorrow, lost, destroyed. We were from the same country, Leon and me. We had known each other as children. And for twelve years, despite everything that should have separated us, we had never left each other… He was my childhood friend, my master of art, the strength and balance of my life. I was ambitious, ardent in life. Everything seemed beautiful, interesting and cheerful because he was there and he loved me and I relied on him. And now there is nothing, nothing. The earth seems to me a black hole where I struggle like a prison. Remember that it fell before my eyes - far away, however, since when I arrived near it, I found only one corpse. There was no one there, neither friends, nor relatives. And his mechanics and I laid him in his coffin…

== Death ==
Peltier died in Paris on February 18, 1926.

== See also ==
- Marie Marvingt
