= Lawrence Malcolm Allison =

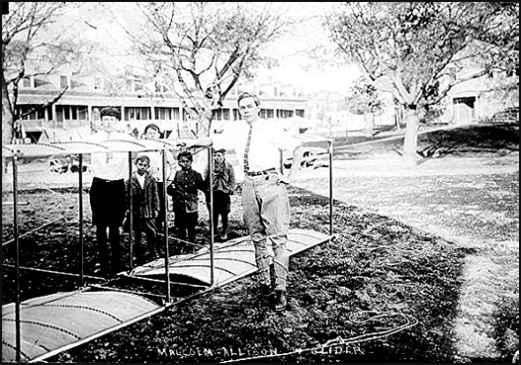
- Allison in 1907 standing in front of one of his gliders
- Born: 1894
- Died: 1974 (aged 79–80)
- Known for: building and flying gliders

Lawrence Malcolm Allison (1894–1974) was an American maker of gliders and was a pioneer aviator.
