= George D. Grundy Jr. =

American aviator

George Debaun Grundy Jr.
- Born: June 21, 1898; Southampton, New York
- Died: May 19, 1998 (aged 99); Leesburg, Florida

George Debaun Grundy Jr. (June 21, 1898 – May 19, 1998) was a pioneer aviator and the last living member of the Early Birds of Aviation.

== Biography ==
Grundy was born June 21, 1898, in Southampton, New York, to Florence Reeves and he was raised in Richmond Hill, Queens. He had his first solo flight on September 17, 1916, on Long Island.

He died on May 19, 1998, in Leesburg, Florida.
