= List of pilots awarded an Aviator's Certificate by the Aéro-Club de France in 1911 =

The Aéro-Club de France issued Aviators Certificates from 1909. These were internationally recognised under the Fédération Aéronautique Internationale.

French aviators' licences were issued from 1 January 1910, but by this time many aviation pioneers, e.g. Louis Blériot and the Wright brothers, had amply demonstrated their abilities and they were therefore not required to pass an examination in order to receive a licence. The first fourteen licences were awarded in alphabetical order, with Blériot being awarded Licence No. 1 and Wilbur Wright receiving No. 15 (No. 13 was not awarded); two further such 'honorary' licences were awarded subsequently and inserted into the sequence as '5bis' and '10bis'.

== List ==
Legend

- Individual was killed in an aviation accident.
- Individual was killed flying in military action.

Aéro-Club de France certificates awarded in 1911 (nos. 345–705)
No.	Name	Date	Country of origin (if not France)	Comment
345	Neri, Giuseppe	4 January 1911	Italy	
346	Pelloux, Maurice	4 January 1911		
347	Tarron, Edmond	4 January 1911		d. in accident 18 April 1911 at Villacoublay/Versailles (France).
348	Gouin, Marie Emile Raphael	4 January 1911		
349	Pouleriguen, François	4 January 1911		
350	Froussard, Ernest	4 January 1911		
351	Contard, Paul	4 January 1911		
352	Cronier, André-Maurice-Henri	3 February 1911		d. 26 June 1927.
353	Cei, Joseph	3 February 1911	Italy	d. in accident 28 March 1911 at Puteaux.
354	Goys de Mezeyrac, Louis Marius de (General)	3 February 1911		
355	Bonzon, Maurice Théodore	3 February 1911		d. 17 November 1911.
356	Raobet, Jean	3 February 1911		
357	Weston, Maximilian John	3 February 1911	UK	
358	Hamel, Gustav	3 February 1911	UK	UK certificate no. 64; d. 23 May 1914 English Channel.
359	Demagneval, Gabriel	3 February 1911		
360	Granseigne, Robert	3 February 1911		
361	Osmont, Georges	3 February 1911		
362	Carles, Fred	3 February 1911		
363	Frantz, Joseph	3 February 1911		d. in 1979.
364	Levat, Marcel	3 February 1911		
365	Martin, Edouard	3 February 1911		d. 27 February 1926.
366	Delagrange, Robert	3 February 1911		
367	Houlette, André	3 February 1911		
368	Hanriot, René	3 February 1911		Father of Marcel Hanriot, no. 95; d. 7 November 1925. Founder of Aeroplanes Hanriot et Cie.
369	Fiorellino, Louis	3 February 1911		d. in March 1952.
370	Grellet, Alexis	3 February 1911		
371	Contour, Ernest	3 February 1911		
372	Kergariou, Marquis Edgard de	3 February 1911		
373	Bergonié, Charles	3 February 1911		
374	Deroye, François	3 February 1911		d. in accident 19 April 1914 at Buc (France).
375	Reimbert, Ernest Jean Marie	3 February 1911		d. 29 December 1956.
376	Debuissy, André	3 February 1911		
377	Reichert, Marie Henri Didier	3 February 1911		
378	Frugier, Léon	3 February 1911		
379	Magnan, Léon	3 February 1911		
380	Denis, Auguste	3 February 1911		
381	Rivollier, Jean	3 February 1911		
382	Ors, Jean	3 February 1911		d. in February 1926.
383	Nissole, Prince Edouard Gaston Emile de	3 February 1911		
384	Chaussier, Pierre	3 February 1911		
385	Chevillard, Maurice	3 February 1911		
386	Lenfant, Louis	3 February 1911		
387	Palade, Antoine Firmin	3 February 1911		
388	Gouguenheim, Pierre	3 February 1911		
389	Benoist, Jean	3 February 1911		d. in accident 25 August 1914.
390	Verrier, Pierre	3 February 1911		
391	Gasnier Du Fresne, Pierre	3 February 1911		
392	Gassier, Marcel	3 February 1911		d. 1 January 1934.
393	Collardeau, Georges	3 February 1911		
394	Chaunac-Lanzac, H. de (Colonel)	3 February 1911		
395	Boillot, Georges Louis	3 February 1911		KIA 20 May 1916.
396	Fregeolière, Renaud de la	3 February 1911		
397	Tixier, Henri Edmond	3 February 1911		d. in accident in 1918.
398	Goux, Jules	3 February 1911		
399	Grailly, Jacques de (Lieut. )	3 March 1911		d. in accident 2 September 1911 at Mont de Rigny/Nangis (France).
400	Pommier, Marin	3 March 1911		
401	Chanovsky	3 March 1911		
402	Wyss, Paul	3 March 1911	Switzerland	
403	Boutmy, Etienne de	3 March 1911		
404	Woodward, G.E.T.	3 March 1911	UK	
405	Meunier, Pierre	3 March 1911		
406	Carabelli, Charles-Louis	3 March 1911		
407	Braun, Robert	3 March 1911		
408	Trétarre, Roger	3 March 1911		KIA 4 September 1914.
409	Schneider, Jacques	3 March 1911		
410	Francezon, Ernest	3 March 1911		
411	Foye, Fernand	3 March 1911		
412	Laparre de Saint-Sernin	3 March 1911		
413	Malard, Armand	3 March 1911		
414	Legrand, Aristide	3 March 1911		
415	Casse, Gilbert (Colonel)	3 March 1911		
416	Poin, André	3 March 1911		
417	Lafargue, Max de	3 March 1911		
418	Fourny, Alexandre	3 March 1911		d. 28 November 1957.
419	Landron, Pierre	3 March 1911		d. in accident 18 June 1911 at Epieds/Chateau-Thierry (France).
420	Mathieu, René	3 March 1911		
421	l'Houmeau, Frédéric	3 March 1911		
422	Parent, Hippolyte	3 March 1911		
423	Dubreuil, Gaston	3 March 1911		d. 10 December 1957.
424	Garnier, Gustave	3 March 1911		
425	Balancie, Henri	3 March 1911		
426	Chemine, Ernest	3 March 1911		d. 9 February 1937.
427	Camine, Victor (Captain)	3 March 1911		d. in accident 2 September 1911, Mont de Rigny/Nangis (France).
428	Peralda, Joseph	3 March 1911		
429	Fileux, Albert	3 March 1911		
430	Olivier, Henri	3 March 1911		
431	Sadi Lecointe, Joseph	3 March 1911		d. June 1944.
432	Castries, Jacques de	3 March 1911		
433	Bon, Paul	3 March 1911		
434	Caudron, Gaston	3 March 1911		d. in accident 10 December 1915 at Lyon-Bron.
435	Derome, Alphonse Marie	3 March 1911		
436	Brulé, Léon	3 March 1911		
437	Copin, Georges	3 March 1911		
438	Rey, Léon	3 March 1911		
439	Laigros, Spartacus	3 March 1911		
440	Ovington, Earle Lewis	3 March 1911	USA	First US Air Mail pilot. d. in 1936.
441	Houpert, André	23 March 1911		
442	Cummings, Joseph	23 March 1911		
443	Boissonnas, Louis	23 March 1911		
444	Guere, Henri	23 March 1911		
445	Guillemard, Théodore	23 March 1911		
446	Gaborit de Montjou, Henri	23 March 1911		
447	Contenet, Henri	23 March 1911		
448	Brindejonc des Moulinais, Marcel	23 March 1911		KIA 19 August 1916.
449	Gautheron, Louis	23 March 1911		
450	Berlot, Henri	23 March 1911		d. 13 December 1920 in the Congo.
451	Desparmet, Jean	23 March 1911		d. in accident 27 October 1911 at Reims.
452	Delacroix, Maurice	7 April 1911		
453	Revelli, Giovanni	7 April 1911	Italy	KIA.
454	Mousnier, Yvon	7 April 1911		
455	Castinger, Edouard	7 April 1911		
456	Divetain, Pierre	7 April 1911		d. 13 October 1926.
457	Ducourneau (Lieut.)	7 April 1911		d. in accident 23 February 1912 at Pau (France).
458	Cayla, Pierre	7 April 1911		
459	Thieulin, Joseph	7 April 1911		
460	Blard, Désiré	7 April 1911		
461	Deschamps de Bois, Herbert	7 April 1911		
462	Martinez, Nicolas	7 April 1911	Mexico	KIA.
463	Lajous, François de	7 April 1911		
464	Jacquemart, Georges	7 April 1911		
465	Clerc, Paul	23 March 1911		
466	Echeman, Paul	23 March 1911		d. 14 May 1912 at Étampes (France).
467	Pujo, Casimir	23 March 1911		
468	Lareinty-Tholozan, Jules de	23 March 1911		
469	Grandjean, Etienne	23 March 1911		
470	La Chapelle-Duval	23 March 1911		
471	Pierce, Samuel	23 March 1911		
472	Alexandroff, Dimitri	7 April 1911		
473	Manissero, Romolo	7 April 1911		
474	Sourdeau, Alexandre	29 April 1911		
475	Prévost, Maurice	29 April 1911		d. in November 1952.
476	Robinet, Jean	29 April 1911		d. in aircraft in Russia.
477	Derome, Paul	29 April 1911		d. in accident 25 August 1915.
478	Bonnier, Marc (Adjudant)	29 April 1911		KIA 1916 on the Russian front.
479	Gilbert Le Lasseur de Ranzay	29 April 1911		d. 10 January 1912.
480	Allard, Maurice	29 April 1911		
481	Francq, Baron R. P. de	29 April 1911		KIA 2 October 1917
482	Gardey, Marcel	29 April 1911		
483	Leonet, Victor	29 April 1911		
484	Vimard, Eugène	29 April 1911		
485	Touzet, Étienne	29 April 1911		
486	Moller, Georges	29 April 1911		
487	Guinard, Ulysse	29 April 1911		d. 22 May 1959.
488	D'Halincourt, Louis	29 April 1911		
489	Hechtfischer, Louis	29 April 1911		
490	Mallet, Joseph	24 May 1911		
491	Van Der Vaero, Max Jack Hubert (Lt. Col.)	24 May 1911		
492	Briey, François de	24 May 1911		
493	Giraud, Etienne	24 May 1911		
494	Leprince, Paul	24 May 1911		d. in accident 1914.
495	Maron, Pierre	24 May 1911		d. in accident 2 September 1911 at Breches-les-Pierre/Chartres.
496	Buschatter, Adalbert	24 May 1911		
497	Lieutard, Henri	24 May 1911		
498	Noé, Arthur (Colonel)	24 May 1911		
499	Partiot, Gérard	24 May 1911		
500	Vittoz-Gallet, Georges	24 May 1911		
501	Migaud, Gabriel	24 May 1911		
502	Fonie, Jacques	24 May 1911		
503	Kieffer, Charles	24 May 1911		
504	Galliard, Jean	24 May 1911		
505	Bernard, Auguste	24 May 1911		d. 6 June 1913 French Buc (France).
506	Lemasson, Pierre	6 June 1911		
507	Prévoteau, Georges	6 June 1911		
508	Battini, Gabriel	6 June 1911		d. at Tunis.
509	Montalent, Olivier de	6 June 1911		d. in accident 24 August 1913 at Rouen (France).
510	Bonamici, Lionello	6 June 1911		
511	Van Meel, Marinus	6 June 1911	Netherlands	
512	Borsalino, Gabriello	6 June 1911		
513	Hubbard	6 June 1911		
514	Ruby, Frédéric (General)	15 June 1911		
515	Chevallier, Joseph	15 June 1911		
516	Paillole, Édouard	15 June 1911		d. in accident 14 July 1911 at Mustapha/Algiers (Algeria).
517	Rey, Philippe	15 June 1911		d. April 1956.
518	Guillebaud, Charles	15 June 1911		
519	Chausse, Paul	15 June 1911		d. in accident 1916.
520	Daucourt, Pierre	15 June 1911		
521	Gourlez, Alexandre	15 June 1911		
522	Lelievre, Eugène	15 June 1911		
523	Challe, Maurice	15 June 1911		KIA 7 October 1916.
524	Morel, Paul	15 June 1911		d. in accident.
525	Driancourt, Madame Marie-Louise	15 June 1911		
526	Deloche, Robert	15 June 1911		
527	Després, Emile	15 June 1911		
528	Seguin, Augustin	15 June 1911		
529	Corso, Emmanuel	15 June 1911		
530	Joly, Charles (Lieut.)	15 June 1911		d. in accident 23 July 1911 at Port-Aviation ("Juvisy Airfield"), Viry-Châtillon.
531	Gelmetti, Attilio	1 July 1911		
532	Espanet, Gabriel	1 July 1911		born 1883 died 1972. Also was a doctor.
533	Issartier, Marcel	1 July 1911		d. in accident 1914.
534	Lacombe, Pierre	1 July 1911		KIA.
535	Vandamme, Constant	1 July 1911		
536	Védrines, Emile	7 July 1911		d. in accident 1 April 1914 at Reims (France).
537	Richet, Albert	7 July 1911		KIA 25 August 1918.
538	Verdier, Ludovic	28 July 1911		
539	Rajewsky, Alexandre	28 July 1911	Russia	d. 9 October 1912 at St. Petersburg (Russia).
540	Hamilton (Comte)	28 July 1911	Sweden	
541	Jitsel, Robert	28 July 1911		
542	Perrigot, Jules	28 July 1911		
543	Barrès, Joseph	28 July 1911		
544	Moineau, René	28 July 1911		
545	Rolland, Marcel (Colonel)	28 July 1911		
546	Bellemois, Georges	28 July 1911		
547	Chapelle, Jacques	28 July 1911		
548	Porte, John Cyril	28 July 1911	UK	Seaplane pioneer
549	Chanteloup, Pierre	28 July 1911		
550	Porcheron, Louis	28 July 1911		
551	Chavagnac, Elie	28 July 1911		
552	David de Lastour	28 July 1911		
553	Janoir, Louis	28 July 1911		
554	Carlin, Louis	28 July 1911		
555	Garsonnin, Louis	28 July 1911		
556	Olivier, Louis	28 July 1911		KIA; d. Sept. 1913 at Melun (France).
557	Chambenoit, Marcel	28 July 1911		d. in accident 27 July 1913 at Auterive (France).
558	Avalos, Manuel	28 July 1911		
559	Chavez, Edouard	28 July 1911	Brazil	
560	Pourpe, Marc	28 July 1911		KIA 2 December 1914.
561	Molina Lavin, Edouardo (General)	28 July 1911	Chile	
562	Debever, Marcel	28 July 1911		d. in accident 18 June 1913 at Étampes.
563	Vergnieault, Octave	28 July 1911		
564	Rochette, Jacques (Colonel)	28 July 1911		
565	Monakoff, Boris	28 July 1911	Russia	
566	Della Noce, Gaston	27 July 1911		d. in accident.
567	Koning, Siebrand	27 July 1911	Netherlands	
568	Santoni, Laurence	27 July 1911	Italy	
569	Dal Mistro, Achille	27 July 1911		d. 25 May 1917.
570	Dax, Ernest (Ernst)	22 August 1911	Germany	d. in accident 21 October 1911 at Schneverdingen (Germany).
571	Nigaud, André (Lieut.)	22 August 1911		
572	Michaud, Henri	22 August 1911		
573	Liger, Alfred	22 August 1911		
574	Gressier, Romain	22 August 1911		
575	Geyer d'Orth, Henri de	22 August 1911		
576	Poumet, Maurice	22 August 1911		
577	Grigoraschwilly	22 August 1911		
578	Chapoule, Jules	22 August 1911		
579	Ville-d'Avray, Thierry de (Lieut.)	22 August 1911		d. in accident 24 September 1912 (or 19 April 1912) at Verdun.
580	Sansever, Henri (Lieut.)	22 August 1911		d. in accident 25 August 1913 at Villacoublay (France).
581	Desille, Louis	22 August 1911		
582	Jacquin, Albert (Captain)	22 August 1911		d. in accident 1917.
583	Godefroy, Louis	22 August 1911		d. in accident.
584	Navarre, Amédée	22 August 1911		
585	Ventre, Ludovic	22 August 1911		d. in March 1958.
586	Helen, Emmanuel	22 August 1911		d. 16 May 1953.
587	Zorileanu, Mircea (Commandant)	22 August 1911	Romania	d. in 1920.
588	Baligant, Gaston	22 August 1911		
589	Whitehouse, William	22 August 1911		
590	Landini, Jules	22 August 1911		
591	Stiploscheck	22 August 1911	Belgium	
592	Marzac, Joseph	8 September 1911		d. 28 December 1933 at Casablanca (Morocco).
593	Leclerc, Paul	8 September 1911		
594	Coville, Frédéric	8 September 1911		
595	Madon, Georges Félix	8 September 1911		d. in accident 11 November 1923 at Tunis.
596	Pontac, Armand de	8 September 1911		
597	Varcin, Louis Adolphe	8 September 1911		
598	Vandal, Paul	8 September 1911		
599	Silvestre, Jacques de	8 September 1911		
600	Boucher, Florentin	8 September 1911		
601	Picard, Fernand	8 September 1911		
602	Delacourt, Jules	8 September 1911		
603	Maurice, Lucien	8 September 1911		Disappeared at sea.
604	Saint-Michel Rivet	8 September 1911		
605	Cornier, Raymond	8 September 1911		
606	Vidal Soler, Emmanuel	8 September 1911		KIA.
607	Richer, Henri	6 September 1911		d. in accident 1911.
608	Bedel, René	8 September 1911		d. in accident 9 July 1912 at Chalons/Mourmelon (France).
609	Baudrin, Emile	8 September 1911		
610	Joachim, Henri	8 September 1911		
611	Cervantès, Frédéric	8 September 1911		
612	Pierra, Emile	8 September 1911		
613	Galou, Sylvain	8 September 1911		
614	Argyropoulos, Emmanouil	8 September 1911	Greece	d. 17 April 1913 at Salonica.
615	Deneau, Lucien	8 September 1911		
616	Lantheaume, Charles	8 September 1911		d. in accident 13 December 1911 at Melun (France).
617	Caillaux, Abel	8 September 1911		
618	Lambert, André	8 September 1911		
619	Couffin, Lucien	8 September 1911		d. in accident 1914.
620	Ponnier, Alfred	8 September 1911		d. 11 April 1931.
621	Junquet, Paul	8 September 1911		d. 12 December 1958.
622	Badet, Etienne	8 September 1911		
623	Prat, Émile	8 September 1911		
624	Escot de Bondy, Pierre (Lieut.)	8 September 1911		
625	Marlin, René	8 September 1911		KIA 5 March 1915 at Selouze.
626	Gorchkoff, Georges	25 September 1911		
627	Sakoff, Nicolas de	25 September 1911		
628	Firstemberg, Boris	25 September 1911		d. 5 October 1935.
629	Galezowsky, Louis	25 September 1911		
630	Bruncher, Jules (General)	25 September 1911		
631	Chabert, Victor	25 September 1911		
632	Lemoine, Alfred	25 September 1911		d. 30 September 1958.
633	Blaignan, André	25 September 1911		
634	Mazier, Louis	25 September 1911		
635	Delaunay, Pierre-Marie	25 September 1911		d. in accident 1912.
636	Des Prez de La Morlais, Armand	25 September 1911		
637	Massol, Edmond	25 September 1911		
638	Leroy, Julien	25 September 1911		d. 1936.
639	Castellan, Edouard	25 September 1911		
640	Porcheron, Joseph	25 September 1911		
641	Depew, Henri	25 September 1911		
642	Lewis, James	25 September 1911		
643	Le Bleu, Paulin	25 September 1911		
644	Burel, Jean	25 September 1911		
645	Tierch, Michel	25 September 1911		
646	Ehrmann, Léonce (or Herman, Léon)	25 September 1911		d. in accident 22 June 1914 at Buc, France (according to Moulin, J.) (or d. 18 April 1914 at Bone (Algeria).)
647	Conard, Marius	25 September 1911		
648	Magnin, Lucien	10 October 1911		
649	Do Huu Vi, Tay	18 October 1911	Vietnam	d. 9 July 1916, Dompierre, Somme (Infantry)
650	Bordage, Alfred Jean (Colonel)	18 October 1911		
651	Guillaume, Camille	18 October 1911		Born in 1882.
652	Rijk, Béatrix de	18 October 1911	Netherlands	
653	Zorra, Louis	18 October 1911	Italy	d. 31 December 1938.
654	Corsini, Alfredo	18 October 1911	Italy	
655	Irat, Georges	18 October 1911		
656	Noël, Louis	18 October 1911		KIA 23 September 1914.
657	Contree, Henri	18 October 1911		
658	Raulet, Fernand	18 October 1911		
659	Roussel, Louis (Commandant)	18 October 1911		d. 15 January 1928.
660	Poitevin, Raoul	18 October 1911		d. in accident 1917 at Miramas.
661	Senart, Jacques	18 October 1911		
662	Henneberg	23 October 1911		
663	Marmies, Raymond de	10 November 1911		
664	Lussigny, Henri	10 November 1911		
665	François, André	10 November 1911		
666	Boerlage, Gerrit	10 November 1911		
667	Benoist, Georges	10 November 1911		
668	Reynaud, Antoine	10 November 1911		
669	Segonzac, René de	10 November 1911		
670	Oliverès, Gaston-Fernand	10 November 1911		d. in accident 15 July 1912 at Bourg-en-Bresse (France).
671	Soyer, Henri	10 November 1911		
672	Caye, Maurice	10 November 1911		
673	Maneyrol, Alexis	10 November 1911		d. in accident 13 October 1923.
674	Souleillan, Auguste (Lieut.)	10 November 1911		d. in accident 22 September 1913 at Oujda (Morocco).
675	Zens, Paul	10 November 1911		
676	Greppo, Joseph	10 November 1911		
677	Tournier, Armand	10 November 1911		
678	Boncour, Henri (Lieut.)	10 November 1911		d. in accident 13 April 1912 at Lairmont, near Bar-le-Duc (France).
679	Serant, Léon	23 November 1911		
680	Mendia, Martin	23 November 1911		
681	Hanne, André	23 November 1911		KIA.
682	Jailler, Lucien	23 November 1911		
683	Grassi Fonseca, Amilcare	23 November 1911		Italian Certificate no. 88.
684	Lanier, Pierre	9 December 1911		
685	Vandein, Pierre	9 December 1911		
686	Réals, Raoul de	9 December 1911		d. in accident 5 February 1914 at Versailles (France).
687	Grazzioli, Abel	9 December 1911		d. in accident 1 April 1915.
688	Agababa, Nikita	9 December 1911		
689	Metairie, Auguste	9 December 1911		
690	Denhaut, François	9 December 1911		d. 12 April 1952.
691	Lefebvre, Louis	9 December 1911		
692	Pe Se Tsong	9 December 1911		
693	Le Ray D'Abrantès, Andoche	9 December 1911		
694	Meurant, René	9 December 1911		
695	Maïcon, Auguste	9 December 1911		
696	Jeannerod, Henri	9 December 1911		KIA 27 September 1915.
697	Rougerie, Lucien	9 December 1911		
698	Soularis, Moïse	9 December 1911		
699	Melin, Eugène	9 December 1911		
700	Latzel, Joseph	14 December 1911		
701	Hahn, Willy	16 December 1911	Germany	d. on 25 January 1916 in Partenkirchen (Germany) after a serious illness.
702	Barbarou, Marius	21 December 1911		d. 8 December 1956.
703	Jeansoulin, Laurent	21 December 1911		
704	Le Vassor, Jacques (Commandant)	21 December 1911		d. in August 1929.
705	Boerner, Edmond (Lieut.)	21 December 1911		d. 21 January 1912 after accident on 19 January 1912 at Senlis (France).

== See also ==
Lists for other years

- 1909
- 1910
- 1912
- 1913
- 1914

== Bibliography ==
- "Aviation Victims Now Number 100" (PDF). The New York Times. 15 October 1911. pp. 1, 8.
- "Aviation History – Browse the History of Flight since 1909". Flightglobal/Archive. Reed Business Information.
- "Flying Pioneers – Vieilles Tiges". Early pioneers list. Past and Present.
- "Grace's Guide" (wiki). The Best of British Engineering. 1750 to 1960s. Grace's Guide.
- Lam, Dave. "Aircraft Deaths – Fixed Wing Only to August 1914" (PDF). Early Aviators.
- Lassalle, Émile Jean. "Les cent premiers aviateurs brevetés au monde" (php). Aviatechno.
- Moulin, Jacques (2009). "Le Journal de l'Aérophile!". Liste Alphabétique des pilotes aviateurs brevetés en France avant le 2 août 1914. Archived from the original on 9 December 2010.
