= Albert Kimmerling =

French aviator (1882–1912)

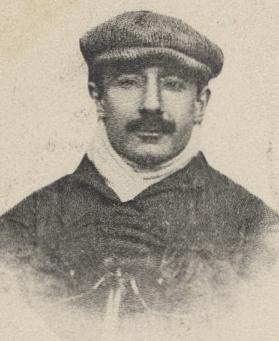
- Born: 22 June 1882; Saint-Rambert-l'Île-Barbe, France
- Died: 9 June 1912 (aged 29); Mourmelon, France
- Occupations: Aircraft engineer and pilot

Albert Kimmerling (22 June 1882 Saint-Rambert-l'Île-Barbe – 9 June 1912, Mourmelon, France) was a pioneer aviator who made the first airplane flight in Africa, taking off at the Nahoon Racetrack at East London, Eastern Cape. on 28 December 1909 in a Voisin biplane. He was also involved in the first airplane crash in South Africa on 1 January 1910 when the flight was repeated. The incident was fairly minor.

Albert Kimmerling studied at Collège-lycée Ampère, Lyon and had a special interest in mechanics. In October 1909 he was employed by Voisin Freres, the a French aircraft manufacturing company, and was sent to promote the company in South Africa. He arrived at East London along with Voisin mechanic J. Moller and an aircraft on 18 December 1909 on board the RMS Kenilworth Castle.

The first manned, heavier-than-air powered flight in South Africa (some reports state in Africa itself) was made by Albert Kimmerling by taking off from the Nahoon Racecourse in East London on 28 December 1909. He then moved the plane up to the Transvaal where he made three more flights at Sydenham Hill near Orange Grove. On 19 March 1910 he flew the first fare paying passenger in South Africa, when Thomas Thornton of the South African Aero Club paid £100 for a flight.

Albert Kimmerling returned to France and settled in Miramas, Southern France. During an aviation festival on 16 June 1910, Albert was injured when he crashed his Voisin from a height of 20 metres.

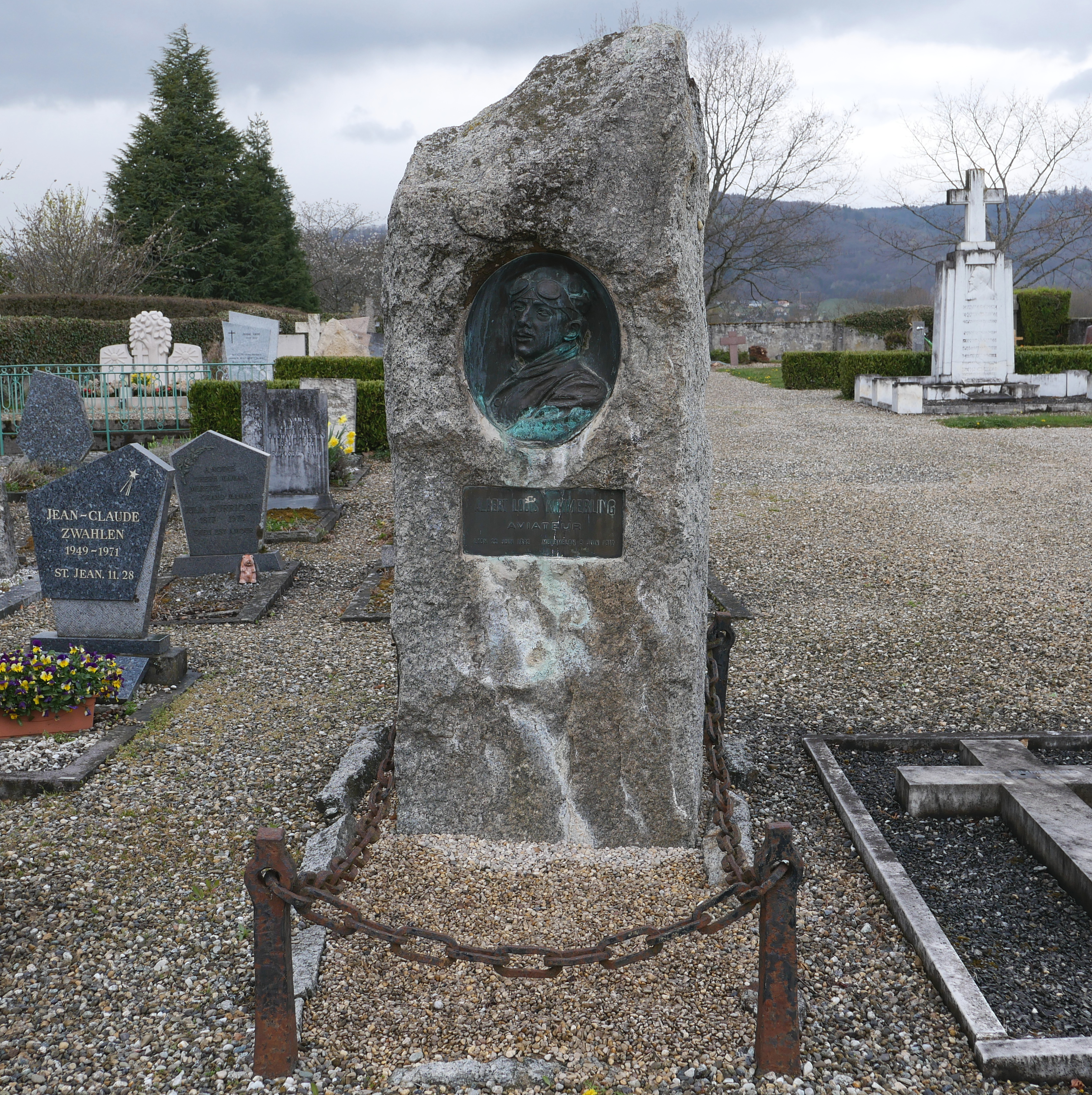
The grave of Kimmerling at the cemetery of Bursinel in the canton of Vaud.

On 8 November 1910, Albert Kimmerling was awarded his Aviator's Certificate by the Aéro-Club de France. On the same day Roger Sommer asked Albert to create an aviation school in Lyon. He flew at many circuits for the aviation school throughout France and Switzerland until 1912, when he left to head up the Steering School Sommer in Bouzy in the Marne.

On 9 June 1912, while test-flying a new 2-seat Sommer monoplane, he crashed and both he and engineer Tonnet were killed.

On 5 August 1912, in honour of Albert Kimmerling, Lyon named a street after him, Rue Kimmerling
