= Henri Brégi =

French aviator

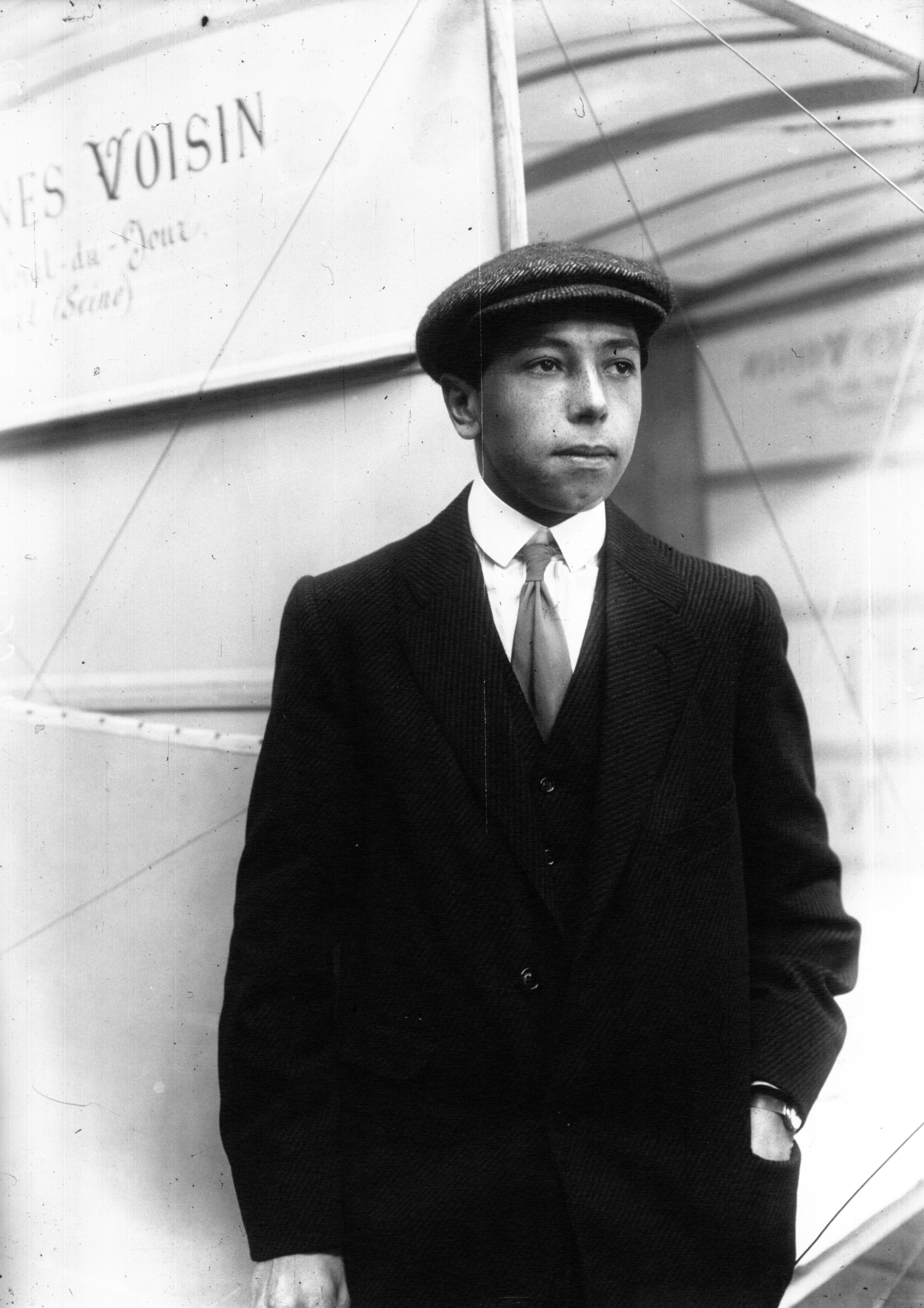
Henri Brégi (1888-1917), French pioneer aviator, besides a plane Voisin in 1909

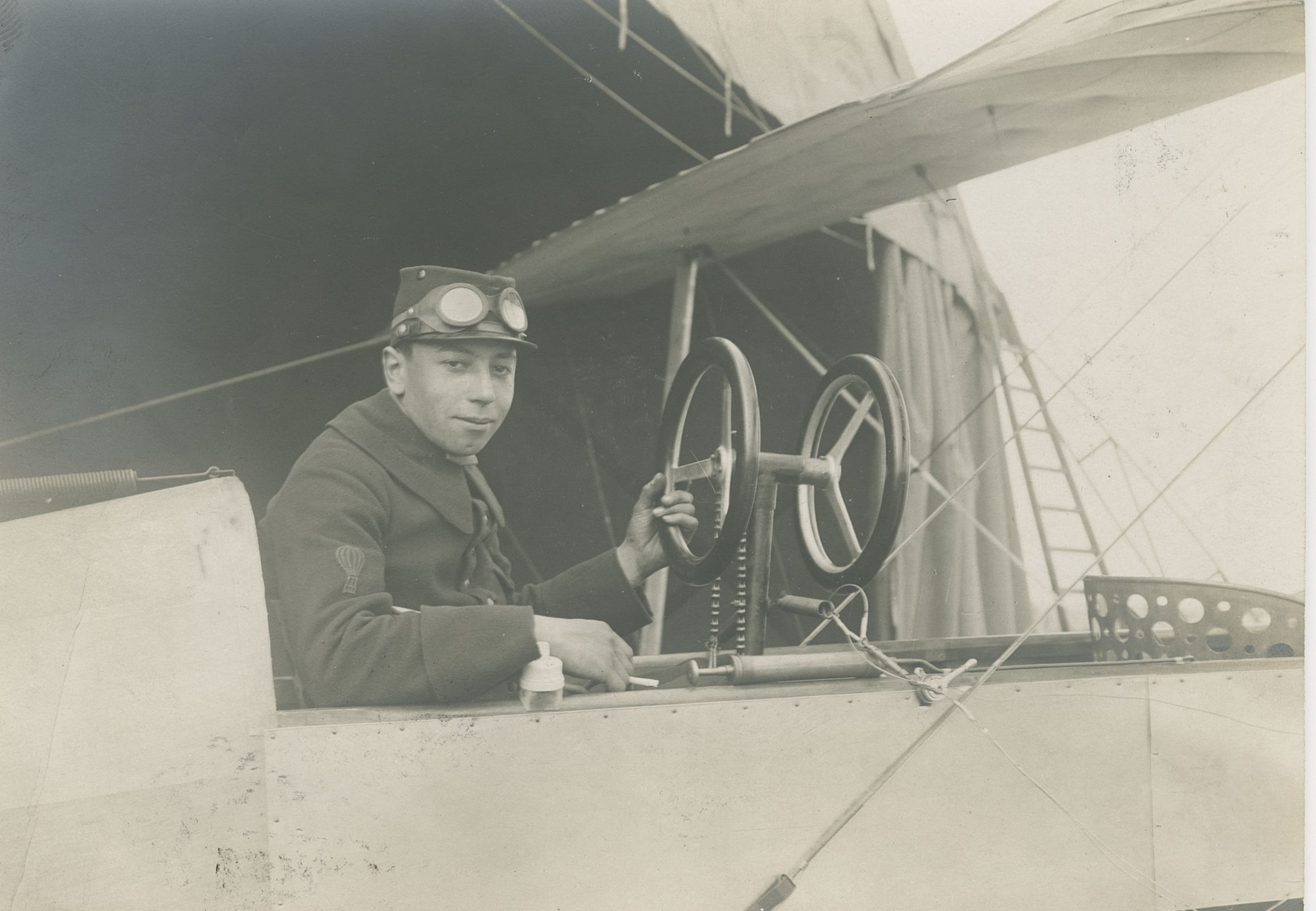
Henri Brégi in 1912

Henri Brégi (4 December 1888 – 12 January 1917) was a French pioneer aviator. He was the first person to fly an aeroplane in Argentina.

== Argentinian flights ==
Brégi was invited by Jorge Newbery to come to Argentina to make the first flight in that country as part of the centenary celebrations of Argentine Independence. On 6 February 1910, Brégi piloted the first aeroplane flight in Argentina. He had sailed on the steamship Parana from France, arriving on 8 Jan 1910. He brought with him two aeroplanes: both Voisin Biplanes, one with an ENV 60 hp engine and the other with a 50 hp air cooled rotary Gnôme (Octavie III).

== Wartime service and death ==
Henri Brégi was mobilized during the First World War. A pilot of the French Army, he was seconded to the Toulon Maritime Aviation Centre. On 12 January 1917, he volunteered to neutralize a German submarine operating off the harbour. A ditching in the bay of Saint-Mandrier-sur-Mer during the mission overturned the seaplane that Brégi was piloting; he drowned.
