= Pierre Marie Bournique =

French aviator (1874–1911)

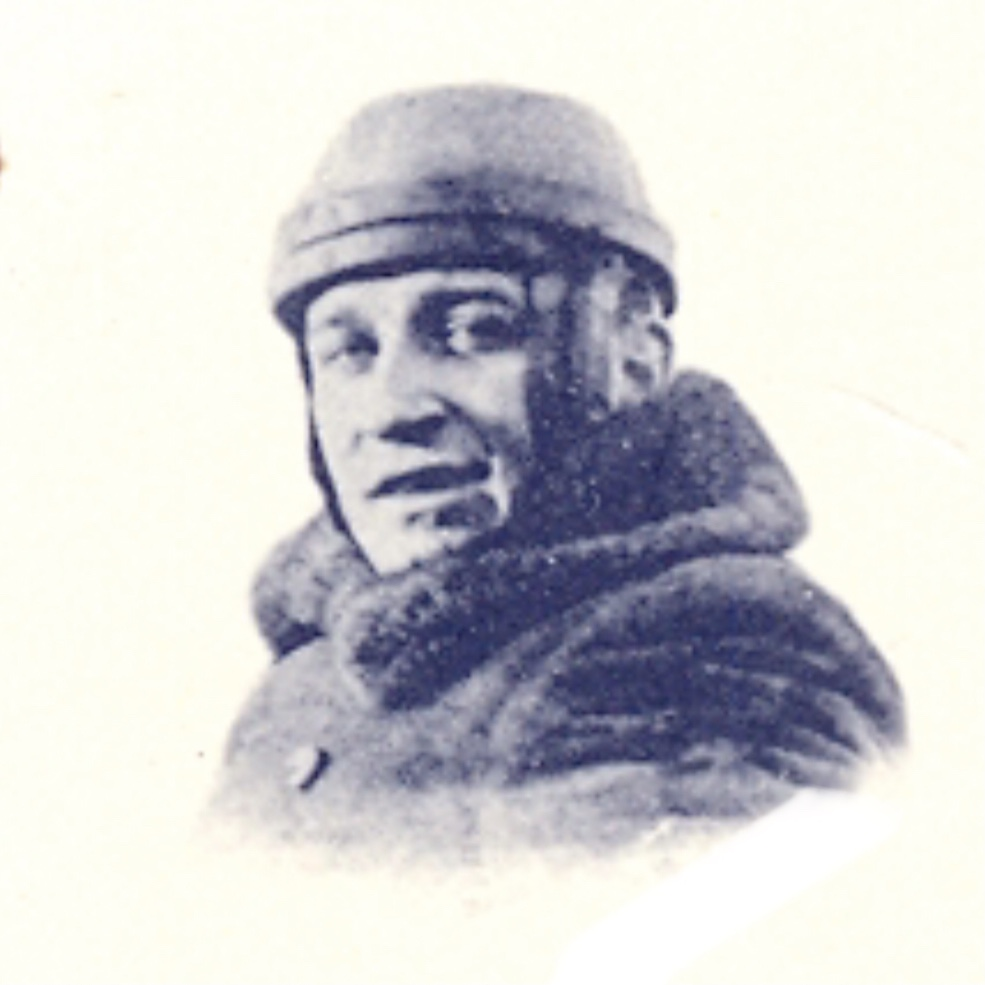
- Born: Pierre Marie Joseph Ernest Bournique; March 4, 1888; Abreschviller, Lorraine (then annexed by Germany)
- Died: May 18, 1911; Reims, France
- Other name: Pierre Marie
- Occupation: Aviator
- Known for: Aviation pioneer

Pierre Marie Bournique (March 4, 1888 – May 18, 1911), known simply as Pierre Marie, was a pioneering French aviator from the region of Lorraine.

== Early life ==
Pierre-Marie-Joseph-Ernest Bournique was born on 4 March 1888, in Abreschviller, Lorraine (at the time annexed by Germany). He was the son of Joseph Bournique, a forestry manager. After completing his secondary education in Strasbourg, where he excelled in several sports, Bournique attended forestry management courses in Nancy from 1905 to 1906. He continued his studies in silviculture at Magdalen College, Oxford. He was recommended by the director of the Oxford forestry school and went to Vancouver, Canada, to gain practical experience at a forestry operation. He returned to Lorraine in May 1908 and worked in his father's forestry business.

== Interest in aviation ==
Fascinated by the emerging field of aviation, Pierre-Marie Bournique decided to become a pilot. He obtained his pilot's license on July 19, 1910, at the Buc aerodrome near Versailles, flying a REP aircraft. Shortly afterward, he began working with the aircraft manufacturer Robert Esnault-Pelterie, flying around the Paris area. He was known in the media as "Pierre Marie." In February 1911, he began working for the aviation manufacturer Armand Deperdussin in Reims-Betheny.

== Achievements ==
On 13 February 1911, Pierre Marie set the world record flying 100 km with a passenger aboard a Deperdussin monoplane powered by a 100-horsepower Gnome engine. The record was widely celebrated in the media.

== Death ==
On 18 May 1911, Pierre Marie tragically died in a plane crash while flying to Mourmelon. The accident occurred shortly after takeoff, with a French army lieutenant on board.
