= Carlos Tenaud =

Peruvian aviatior (1884–1911)

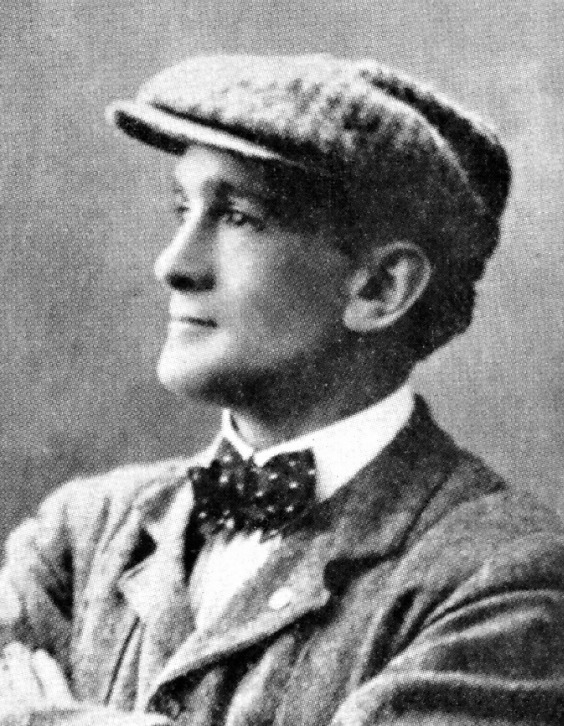
- Born: 10 July 1884; Paris, France
- Died: 8 September 1911 (aged 27); Lima, Peru
- Resting place: Presbítero Maestro Cemetery
- Occupation: Aviator
- Parent(s): Julio Tenaud and María Luisa del Pomar

Carlos Tenaud y Pomar (10 July 1884 – 8 September 1911) was a French-born Peruvian aviator. He was one of the pioneers of global aviation and is considered a hero of civil aviation.

== Biography ==
He was the son of Peruvians Julio Tenaud and María Luisa del Pomar. Born in Paris, he completed his schooling there. After obtaining his baccalaureate, he dedicated himself to studying aviation technology, a new and emerging field at the time.

He moved to Lima, bringing with him a project for an aeroplane he had invented, which he proposed for construction in Peru. President José Pardo y Barreda, a major proponent of technical education, sent him to the School of Arts and Crafts, directed by Pedro Paulet. There, Tenaud built the first Peruvian airplane, a monoplane whose wings resembled those of a butterfly (1909). However, the aircraft failed to fly properly—it briefly lifted off the ground but then fell sideways. The government then sponsored him to travel to France to receive advanced aeronautical training (9 September 1910).

Tenaud enrolled at the Étampes Academy, led by the renowned Louis Blériot. Blériot regarded him as one of his best students, as Tenaud completed his training in only eight lessons without damaging any valuable components. On 23 November 1910, the Aéro-Club de France awarded him Pilot Certificate No. 298. He later conducted further flight training, flying between Étampes and Reims.

The Pro Aviation League in Peru called Tenaud back, and he returned along with fellow aviator Juan Bielovucic, arriving in Lima on 6 January 1911 to a warm public reception. Tenaud brought with him a Blériot monoplane, purchased with his own money. The plane featured a small three-cylinder, 25-horsepower Anzani engine.

While Bielovucic flew his Voisin biplane over Lima, Tenaud prepared a makeshift airfield in Limatambo to test his Blériot, despite the unsuitable terrain. In his first test flight, he had a minor accident, but with Bielovucic's help, he repaired the damage. On 2 February 1911, during a definitive test, tragedy struck. As he attempted to take off, the plane failed to clear electrical wires at the edge of the field, crashing to the ground.

Tenaud sustained severe spinal cord injuries and was first taken to a clinic, then to his parents' home, where he died on 8 September 1911, after a long and painful struggle.

== In popular culture ==
Inspired by Tenaud's fatal flight, writer Abraham Valdelomar wrote a theatrical piece titled El vuelo (translated: The Flight) in 1912. It was published as a serial in the newspaper El Puerto in Callao, but only fragments remain.

Luis Alberto Sánchez believed that Valdelomar, when he suffered his own fatal spinal injury, may have recalled the tragic death of Tenaud.
