= Léon Delagrange =

French sculptor

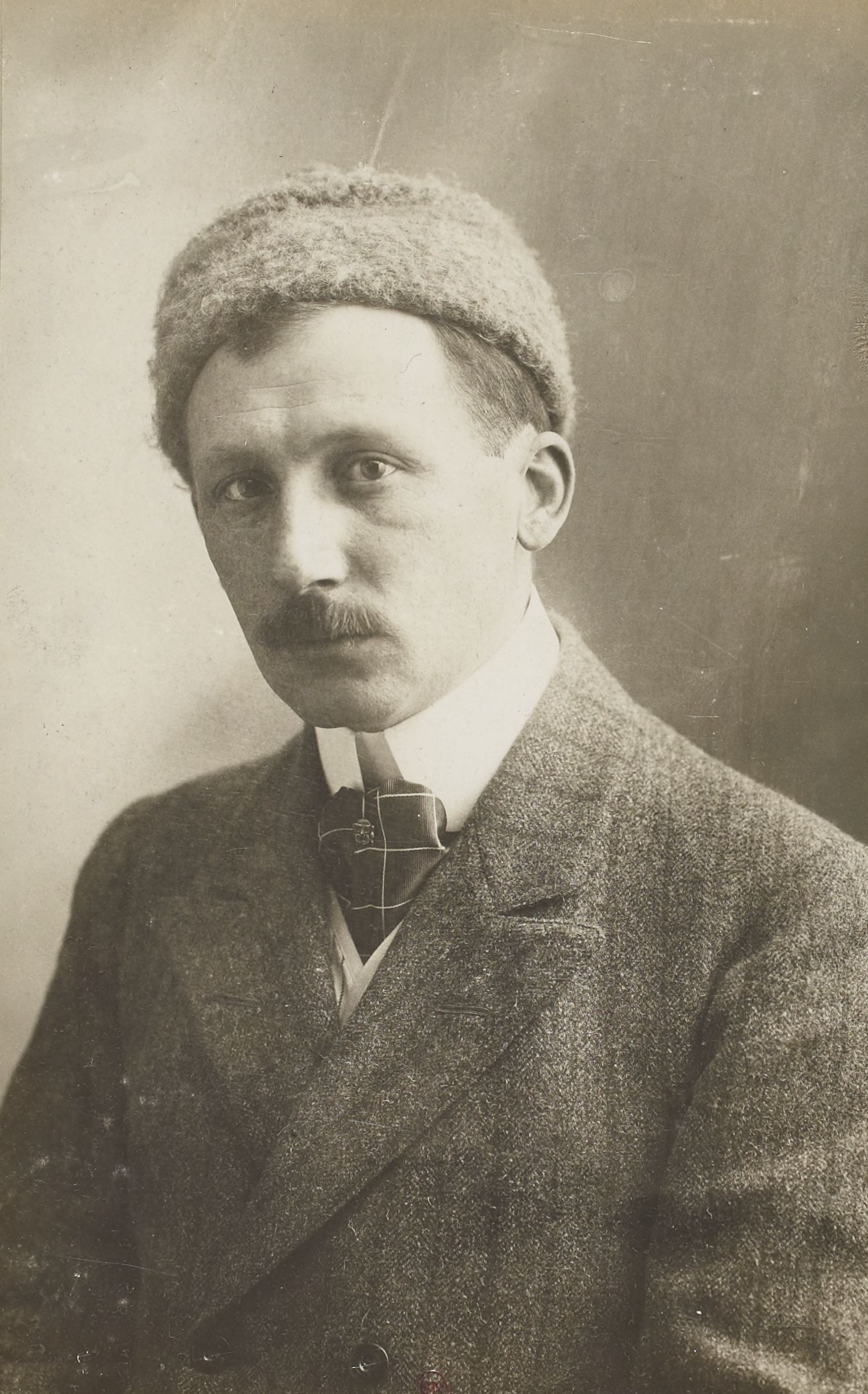
- Delagrange sometime between 1908 and 1910.
- Born: Ferdinand Marie Léon Delagrange; 13 March 1872; Orléans, France
- Died: 4 January 1910 (aged 37); Bordeaux, France
- Awards: Knight of the Legion of Honor

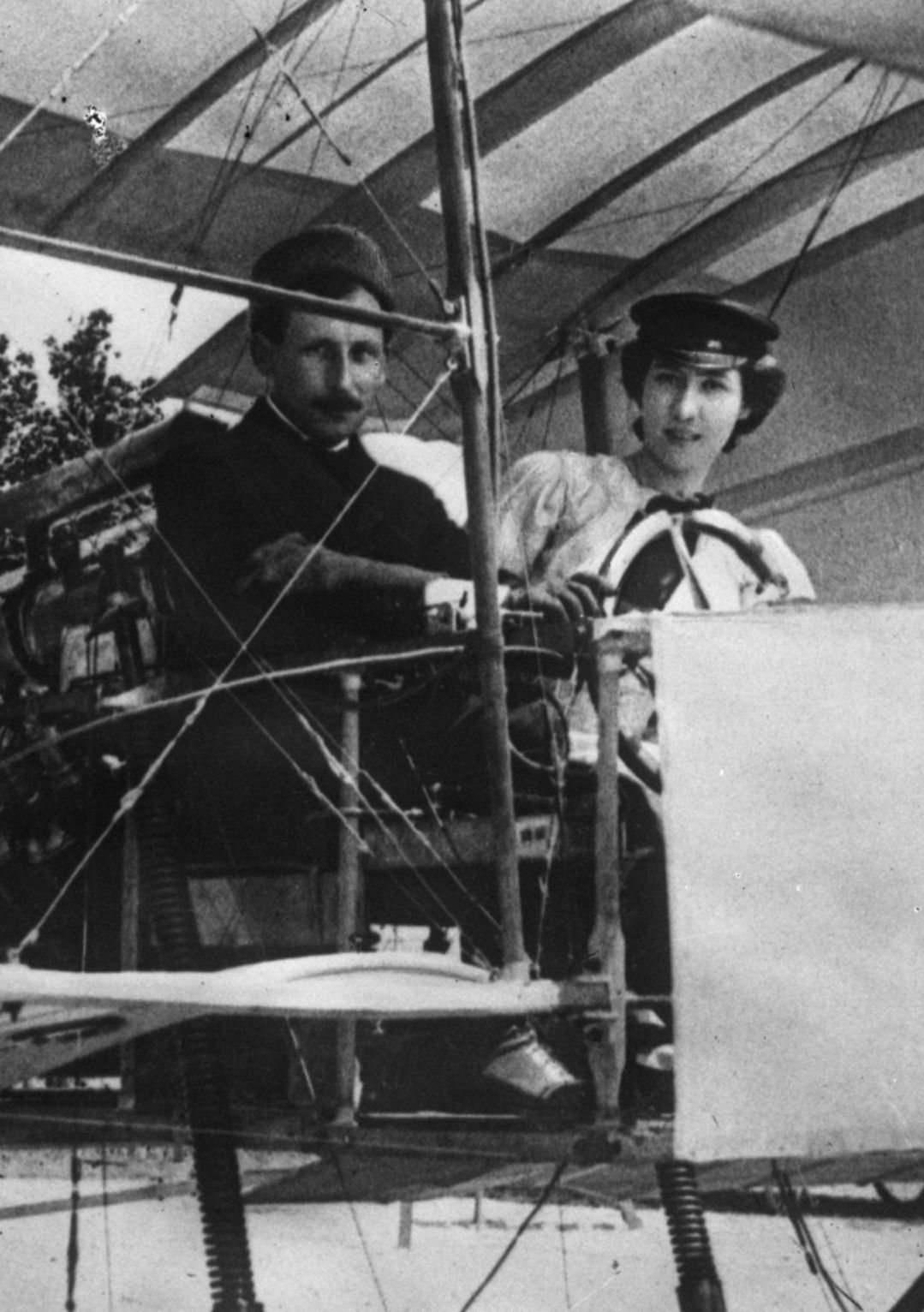
Delagrange and Thérèse Peltier in 1908.

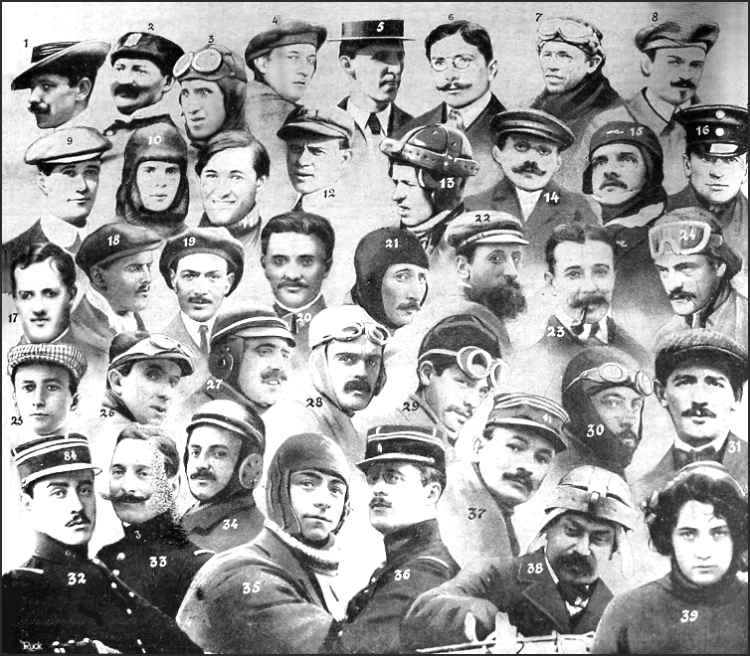
Delagrange (image #21) and others who died in aviation accidents before 1912.

Ferdinand Marie Léon Delagrange (French pronunciation: [fɛʁdinɑ̃ maʁi leɔ̃ dəlaɡʁɑ̃ʒ]; 13 March 1872 – 4 January 1910) was a French sculptor and pioneering aviator.

== Early years ==
Léon Delagrange was born on 13 March 1872 in Orléans, France, the son of a textile factory owner. As a teenager he studied sculpture at the École des Beaux-Arts under Louis Barrias and Charles Vital-Cornu and was represented at several exhibitions in Paris. He was a member of the Society of French Artists and received a commendation in 1901. Delagrange became a well-known automobilist.

== Early aviation ==
Delagrange was one of the first people in Europe to take up aviation. In 1907, he became interested in flying and became a pioneer of powered flight. That same year he was one of the first people to order an aircraft from Gabriel Voisin of the Voisin brothers, enabling them to get established as manufacturers of airplanes. The aircraft was the first example of what was to become one of the most successful early French aircraft, the Voisin 1907 biplane. He made his first public flight on 16 March 1907 at Bagatelle, France, where he flew the biplane. His feats soon attracted worldwide attention and he is said to have refused a guarantee of US$10,000 if he would visit the United States to perform demonstrations.

In March 1908 a period of intense competition between Henri Farman and Delagrange began, Delagrange now flying the new Delagrange II incorporating the modifications that had been made to Farman's Voisin aircraft, now renamed the Farman Ibis and with a new covering of "Continental" brand rubberised balloon fabric replacing the original varnished silk. On 21 March Farman set a new Aéro-Club de France record with a flight of just over 2 kilometres (1.25 miles). In the evening of the same day, Delagrange took Farman back to the hangar, making Farman the first fixed-wing aircraft "passenger". At the end of May Farman had also made the first flights in Europe with a passenger, carrying Ernest Archdeacon for 1,242 metres (4,075 ft) at Ghent.

Later in 1908, Delagrange toured Italy, where he made flight demonstrations. It was during one of these demonstrations on 8 July 1908 that he made the world's first flight with a female passenger, his partner and fellow sculptor Thérèse Peltier. On 6 September 1908, he set distance and endurance records with a flight of 24.727 kilometres (15.365 mi) lasting 29 minutes 53.8 seconds at Issy-les-Moulineaux.

On 7 January 1909, Delagrange was awarded one of the first eight aviator certificates awarded by the Aéro-Club de France. In 1909, he also received the Lagatiner prize for a fight at Port-Aviation (often called "Juvisy Airfield") at Viry-Châtillon, France, of 5.8 kilometres (3.6 mi) in 10 minutes 18 seconds.

Delagrange participated in the world's first air race at Port-Aviation on 23 May 1909 and in two other races that year. In addition to his original Voisin airplane, he also bought three Blériot XIs, and he formed a team by recruiting pilots Hubert Le Blon, Léon Molon, and Georges Prévoteau. He also flew in several non-competitive meetings. He was the first to equip a Blériot XI with a 50-horsepower (37 kW) Gnome engine in place of the 25-horsepower (19 kW) Anzani, thereby doubling its power.

During 1909, Delagrange participated in the following air race meetings:

- Port-Aviation, Viry-Châtillon, France (23 May)
- Port-Aviation, Viry-Châtillon, France (30 May–3 June)
- Reims, France
- Spa, Belgium
- Doncaster, England (October)

When the first French "Brevets de Pilote" (pilot's licenses) were granted in 1910, Delagrange received No. 3, based on the alphabetical order among the first fourteen license holders.

== 1909 Doncaster Aviation Meeting ==
Delagrange flew at the First Flying Meeting in England, the Doncaster Aviation Meeting, held on 18 and 26 October 1909. On the second and final day of the races (Tuesday, 26 October 1909), he flew his Gnome-engined Blériot XI on one 6-mile (9.7 km) lap in 7 minutes 36 seconds and at average speed of approximately 50 to 53 miles per hour (80 to 85 km/h), breaking the world speed record in spite of stormy weather. Delagrange was fourth in the Doncaster Aviation competition program, which also included pilots such as Samuel Cody, Roger Sommer, Hubert Le Blon, Léon Molon, Walter Windham (the Aeroplane Club's founder), and Edward Mines.

A cartoon sketch by Dudley Hardy of Delagrange during his stay in Doncaster was reproduced in the Doncaster Aviation Meeting Souvenir Programme (18–23 October 1909).

== 1909 Michelin Cup ==
In an attempt to win the 1909 International Michelin Cup, presented for the longest nonstop fight distance of 1909, Delagrange established a new distance record for monoplanes and a new world speed record on 30 December 1909 in a flight at Port-Aviation, covering 200 kilometres (124 mi) in 2 hours 32 minutes at an average speed of approximately 79 kilometres per hour (49 mph); however, he did not succeed in beating Henry Farman's record for distance.

== Death ==
On 4 January 1910, in front of a crowd of spectators, Delagrange was piloting his Blériot XI as part of the Croix d'Hins over Bordeaux, France, in stormy weather in an area whose winds frequently blew at 32 kilometres per hour (20 mph). This flight was a preliminary flight before his planned attempt to break Henry Farman's distance record that afternoon. Delagrange had circled the aerodrome three times when, as he was turning at high speed against the wind, the left wing of the monoplane broke, resulting in the other wing collapsing immediately. The plane fell from a height of approximately 20 metres (65 feet), turning half over as it fell. Delagrange did not have time to disengage himself from his seat and was killed when the wreckage of his plane crashed to the ground and the engine crushed his skull. The monoplane had been doubly-braced at the essential points and had been given a careful examination before ascending, with the accident attributed to the plane "maneuvering too quickly into the puffy wind."

Delagrange was the world's fourth pilot to die in an airplane crash, all of whom died within a fifteen-month period. A number of the other Doncaster competitors were similarly killed flying in subsequent years, including Le Blon in 1910 and Cody in 1913.

== Awards and honors ==
Delagrange was named a Knight of the Legion of Honor on 21 July 1909. In December 1909, he received an enamel medal from the French Academy of Sciences for aeronautic achievements.

== In popular culture ==
Doncaster Brewery produced a special brew to commemorate Delagrange's achievements during the Doncaster Aviation Flight Meeting in 1909.
