= Albert Étévé =

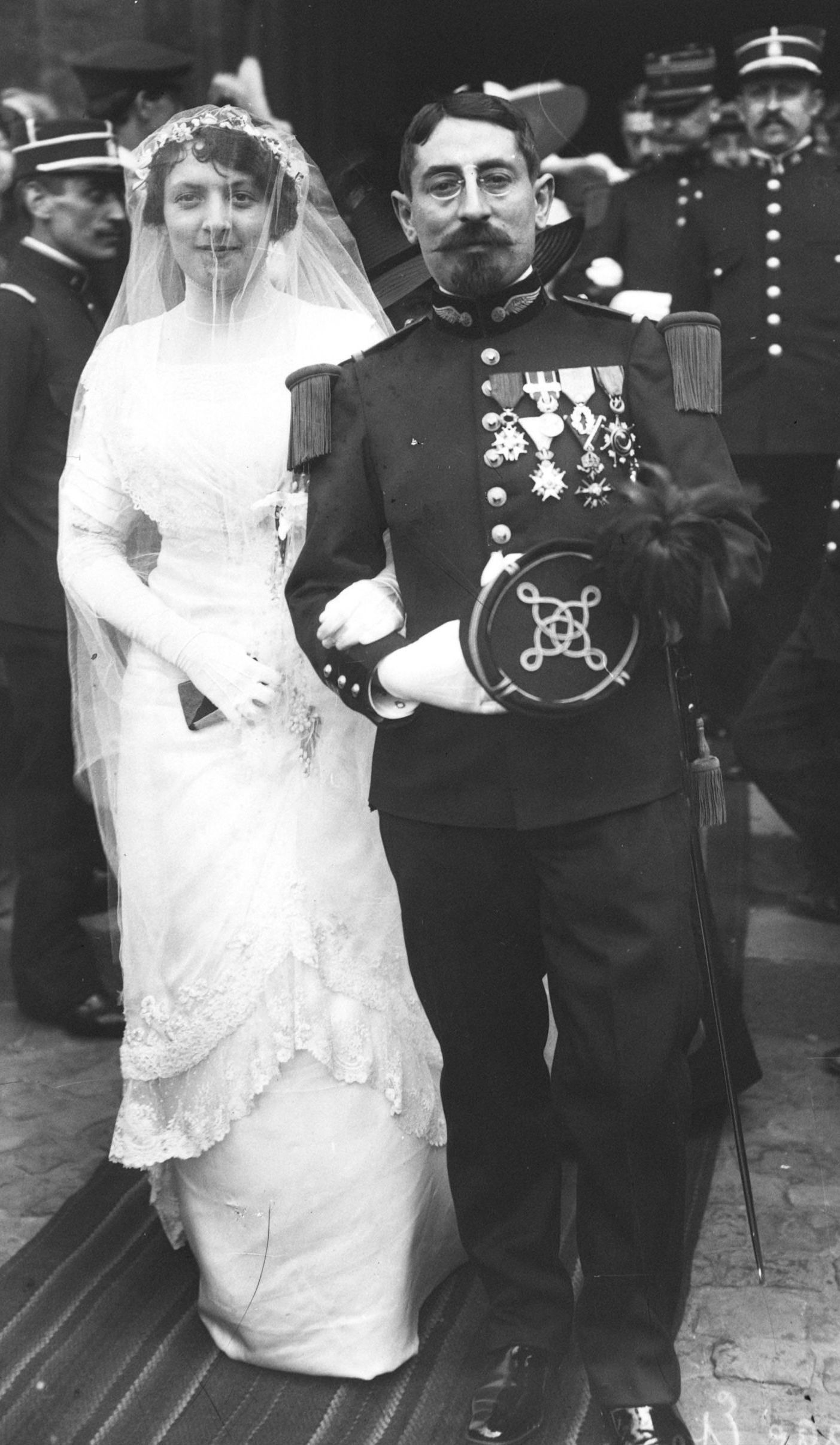
- Albert Étévé at his wedding in 1912.

Albert Octave Étévé (24 May 1880 – 18 April 1976) was a French aeronautical engineer, and inventor of the eponymous anemometer. He was born in the 19th arrondissement of Paris and died in the 9th arrondissement of Paris.

== Career ==
=== Belle Époque ===
A graduate of the École polytechnique in 1902, Étévé became an officer in the military engineering corps. He was first assigned to aerostation in 1906, and obtained his free balloon pilot's license in 1907, then his military airship pilot's license in February 1910. In 1908, he was promoted to captain for acts of war in Morocco and assigned to the Chalais-Meudon laboratory. He obtained his pilot license (no. 89) in June 1910 on the first Wright biplane delivered to the army. He participated in the Grande Semaine d'Aviation de la Champagne in 1910. He then invented an automatic stabilizer adapted to this biplane, and then, in 1911, he created a vane-type airspeed indicator, the Étévé anemometer, which he tested on a Maurice Farman biplane, and which would become standard on board military airplanes before the advent of Raoul Badin's airspeed indicator. On 11 April 1911, he commanded the first military aircraft stationed at Chartres – Champhol Aerodrome. In September 1912, Captain Albert Étévé was promoted to head of the Saint-Cyr-l'École aeronautical center: aviation and aerostation were grouped under his command. The field along the "route aux cochons" (the current Rue du Docteur-Vaillant) was chosen, as well as the Charles Renard barracks, intended to accommodate the pilots.

=== First World War ===
Subsequently, between 1914 and 1918, he was responsible for monitoring the work of manufacturers at the Service des fabrications de l’aviation (series-produced aircraft and prototypes) and between 1916 and 1918 at the Service Technique de l'Aéronautique (STAé, new aircraft). In 1915, on a Farman aircraft, he designed the first machine gun turret system ("Étévé system"), which would be used by the French as well as the Allies during the First World War. He wrote French: La Victoire des cocardes to recount this period of early aviation. Major Albert Caquot, his superior at the STAé, would judge the Étévé's account "impartial and objective".

=== Interwar period ===
Étévé was assigned to the Corps of Aeronautical Engineers upon its creation in 1925.

He became inspector general of aeronautics in 1935, and led technical investigations. In 1936 and 1937, he carried out a mission on aerial armament, and he was tasked with organizing the defense of air bases in 1939.

== Honours ==
- Commander of the Legion of Honour by decree of 10 December 1936
  - Officer of the Legion of Honour by decree of 11 July 1922
  - Knight of the Legion of Honour by decree of 14 October 1911
- Knight of the Ordre des Palmes académiques
- Commemorative medal for Morocco

== Works ==
- Étévé, Albert (1961). Avant les cocardes: Les débuts de l'aéronautique militaire (in French). Robert Laffont..
- Étévé, Albert (1970). La Victoire des cocardes: L'aviation française avant et pendant la Première Guerre mondiale (in French). Robert Laffont. ISBN 978-2-2210-2236-8..

== The Étévé anemometer ==
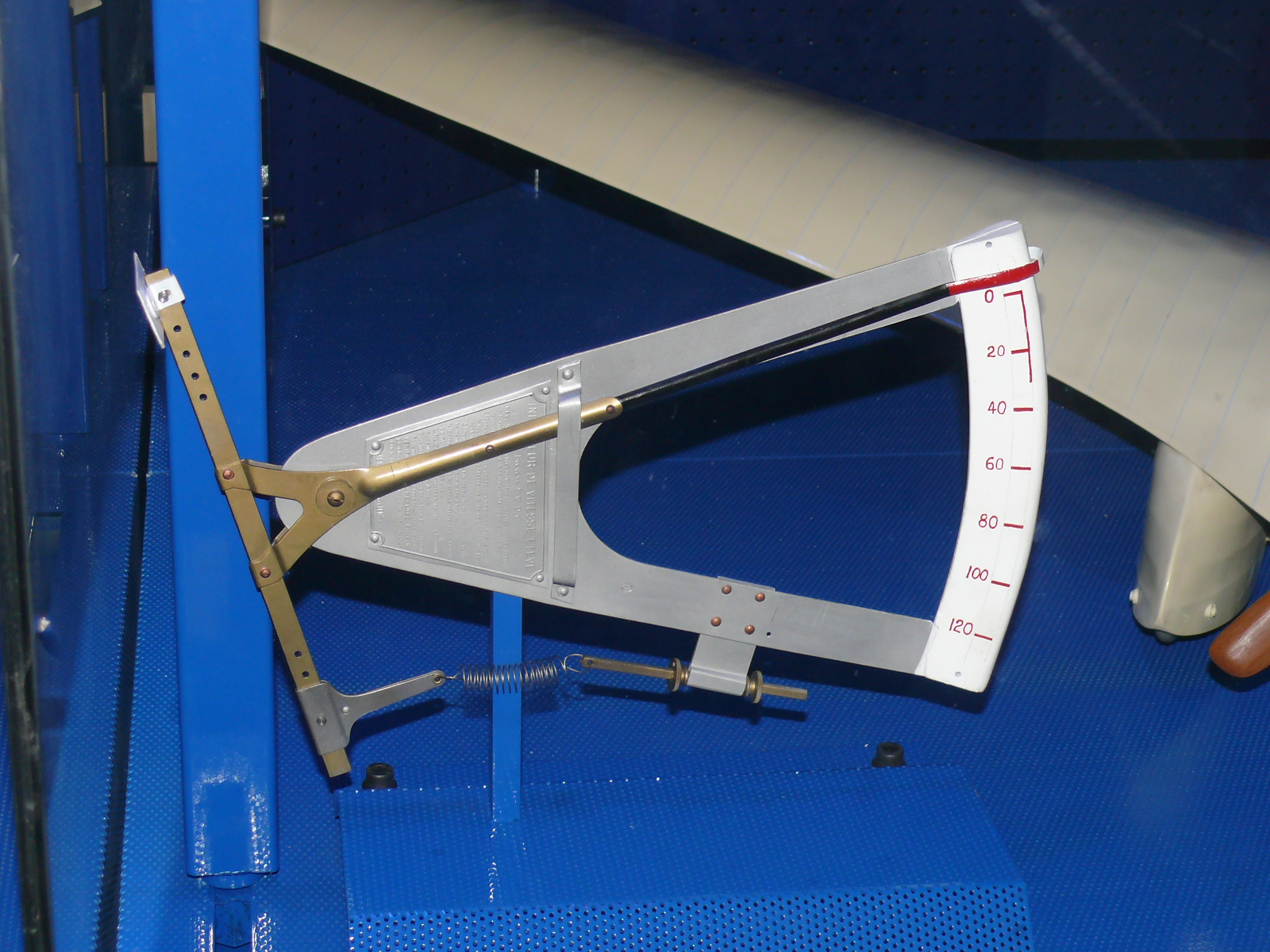
Étévé anemometer

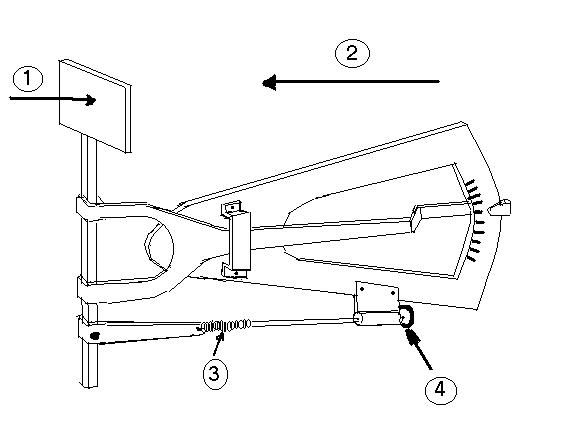
Principle: (1) Vane that tilts under the effect of the relative wind. (2) Direction of flight. (3) Spring. (4) Zero adjustment knob.
