= Voisin 1907 biplane =

1900s French aircraft

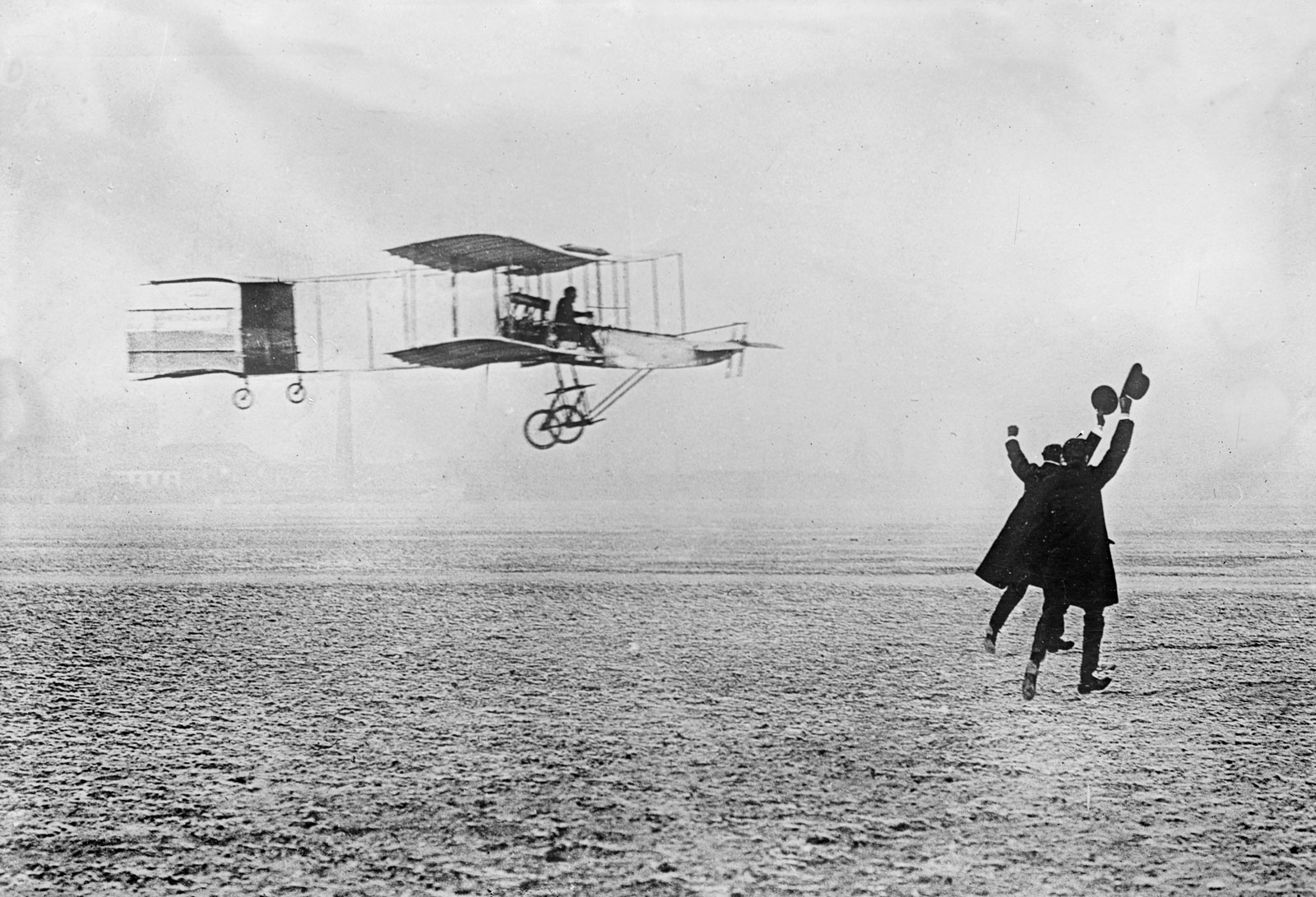
- Henri Farman winning the Archdeacon Prize for the first closed-circuit kilometre flight in Europe

General information
- Type: Experimental aircraft
- National origin: France
- Manufacturer: Frères Voisin
- Designer: Gabriel Voisin
- Number built: ~60

History
- First flight: 30 March 1907

The 1907 Voisin biplane (referred to as the Voisin No. I by the 1913 edition of Jane's All the World's Aircraft), (Note: The name Voisin I was later used by the French military as the designation for the Rhône powered versions of the Voisin L) was Europe's first successful powered aircraft, designed by aeronautical engineer and manufacturer Gabriel Voisin. It was used by the French aviator Henri Farman (Note: Born in France to British father, Henri (or Henry) Farman took French nationality in 1937) to make the first heavier-than-air flight lasting more than a minute in Europe, and also to make the first full circle. The first examples of the aircraft were known by the name of their owners, for instance the Delagrange I, or the Henri Farman n°1. Farman made many modifications to his aircraft, and these were incorporated into later production aircraft built by Voisin. The type enjoyed widespread success, and around sixty were built.

== Background ==
Between 1904 and 1908, there was fierce competition between European aviation experimenters attempting to achieve powered heavier-than-air flight. Although the Wright Brothers had first flown a powered aircraft in 1903, and by the end of 1905, had flown their Flyer III many times (including a flight of 24 miles (39 km) in 39 minutes 23 seconds on 5 October), they had chosen not to make public demonstrations or allow close examination of their aircraft because they feared that this might jeopardize their prospects of commercially exploiting their discoveries. As a result, many people did not believe the claims of the Wright Brothers until Wilbur Wright's demonstrations at Le Mans in France during August 1908, when their advance in airplane control was obviously apparent. (Note: The Wright brothers were the first to understand the necessity for coordinated yaw and roll control in order to make fully controlled turns)

In 1906, Alberto Santos-Dumont had made Europe's first officially recognised heavier-than-air powered flights using his 14-bis aircraft, witnessed by officials from the Aero Club de France. The successful flights made in 1907–1908 by Léon Delagrange and Henri Farman in their Voisin aircraft put the Voisin brothers at the forefront of European aviation development.

== Design and development ==
After assisting Ernest Archdeacon with his gliding experiments in 1904 Gabriel Voisin briefly entered a partnership with Louis Blériot in 1905. After the failure of their second aircraft, the Bleriot IV, the partnership was dissolved in November 1906. After parting from Blériot, Gabriel Voisin set up his own aircraft construction company, Les Frères Voisin, in partnership with his brother Charles. The first powered aircraft designed by the Voisin brothers was built for Henry Kapférer, Henri Deutsch de la Meurthe's nephew. It was completed in March 1907 but never flew. Kapferer had insisted on a Buchet gasoline engine which developed only 20 horsepower, which was inadequate to achieve flight.

=== Early flights ===
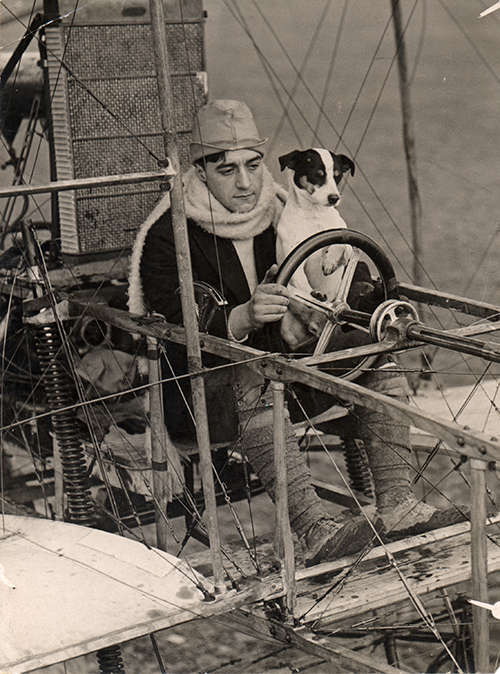
Edmond Poillot flying a Voisin biplane with a dog, Smithsonian National Air and Space Museum

At the same time, the Voisin brothers and their draughtsman Maurice Colliex were building a similar aircraft, which had been ordered by the sculptor Léon Delagrange. This became known as the Delagrange I, since the Voisin brothers had decided that the aircraft they built would bear the name of their owner prominently placed on the tail surfaces, "Voisin Frères" appearing underneath in much smaller lettering. This was done because Voisin believed that people would be more ready to buy aircraft if the glory of flying them went to them rather than to the builder. This practice is a source of confusion to historians and was also to lead to considerable resentment on Gabriel Voisin's part, since the focus of attention was indeed generally on the pilots rather than on those who were responsible for the design and construction of the aircraft.

Powered by a 50 hp V8 Antoinette engine, it was a pusher configuration two-bay biplane with a wingspan of 10 m (33 ft). A biplane elevator was carried in front of the wings on the end of a short nacelle and a boxkite-like biplane empennage of half the span of the mainplanes with three vertical surfaces each carrying a trailing-edge rudder was carried on booms behind the wings. The undercarriage consisted of a pair of wheels on v-struts under the trailing edge of the wings and small wheels mounted at the ends of the lower tailbooms. There was no provision for direct lateral control. Before Wilbur Wright's flying demonstrations in France in August 1908 the importance of roll control to make controlled turns was not appreciated by European experimenters, who concentrated on attempting to produce inherently stable and practical (Note: " The Voisin's undercarriage supported, never modified, three hundred landings inflicted by H. Farman", in l'Aérophile 1908 feb.p.39) aircraft.

The first attempt to fly the aircraft was made by Gabriel Voisin on 28 February 1907 at the Polygon de Vincennes, but the lower booms supporting the tail failed when he attempted to lift off. After repairs a second attempt was made on 16 March, but on lifting off the engine torque drove the left-hand wing onto the ground, ending the attempted flight. This problem was overcome by adding 2 kg (4.4 lb) ballast to the right wing. Thus modified, three flights, the best of 60 m (200 ft) were made by Charles Voisin on 30 March. The aircraft was then fitted with floats and a series of unsuccessful trials were made on the Lac d'Enghien, following which the wheels were replaced. Delagrange made two short flights at Issy les Moulineaux on 2 November 1907, but on 6 November another flight ended in a crash in which the aircraft was damaged beyond repair. Delagrange promptly ordered a second aircraft, later called the Delagrange II.

=== Farman's successes ===
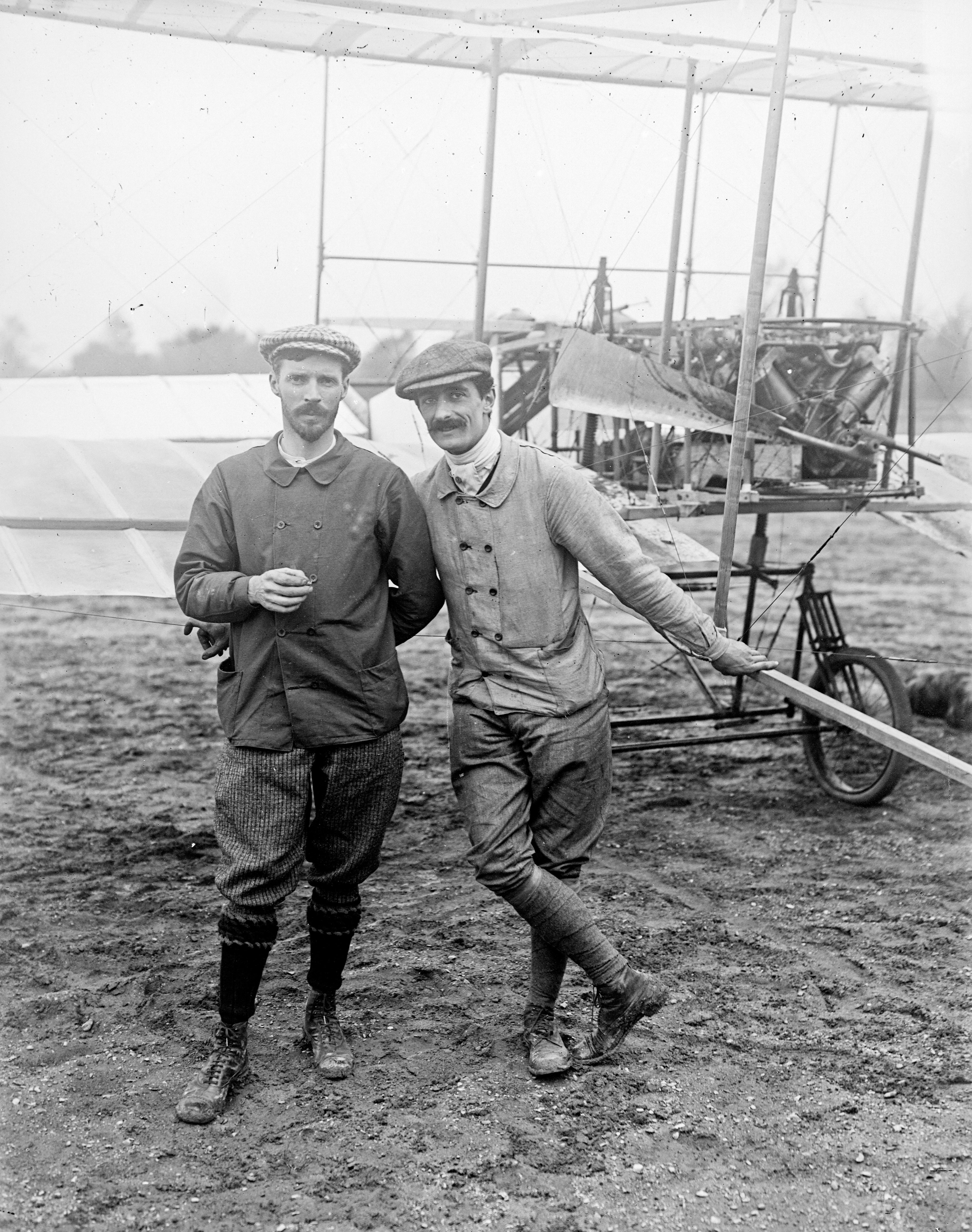
Henry Farman (left) with Gabriel Voisin

A second machine, identical apart from slight changes to the undercarriage, was ordered by Henry Farman in July 1907 and first flew on 30 September 1907. Named Henri Farman n°1 (as painted on the vertical tail), this became known as the Voisin-Farman, or, later, the Farman I.

On 15 October, he succeeded in making a flight of around 285 m (935 ft), which would have been a world record for distance had it been officially observed and measured, and following more flights on 19 and 23 October, including an officially witnessed flight of 185 m (607 ft) which won an award from the Aero Club de France for a flight of over 150 metres, he set a new official world record for distance with a flight of 771 m (2,530 ft). This flight won prizes awarded by the AeCF for flights of over 300 and 500 metres and also gained the Archdeacon Cup for the greatest distance flown.

Later that year Farman made some modifications to the aircraft, replacing the biplane front elevator with a single surface and reducing the span of the rear horizontal surfaces. In the original tail assembly, the upper surface was a lifting surface, while the lower was a non-lifting surface intended to act as a stabiliser: in the new arrangement both surfaces contributed lift. The wings had been re-rigged with dihedral to give lateral stability and allow some roll control (Note: The roll is induced by yaw as in 2 axis control) despite the lack of ailerons or wing warping. Further flights were made in November, in which he made his first turns, and on 13 January 1908 he won the 50,000 francs Deutsch de la Meurthe-Archdeacon Grand Prix de l'Aviation for being the first aviator to complete an officially observed 1-kilometre closed circuit flight, including taking off and landing under the aircraft's own power.

=== Development in 1908 ===
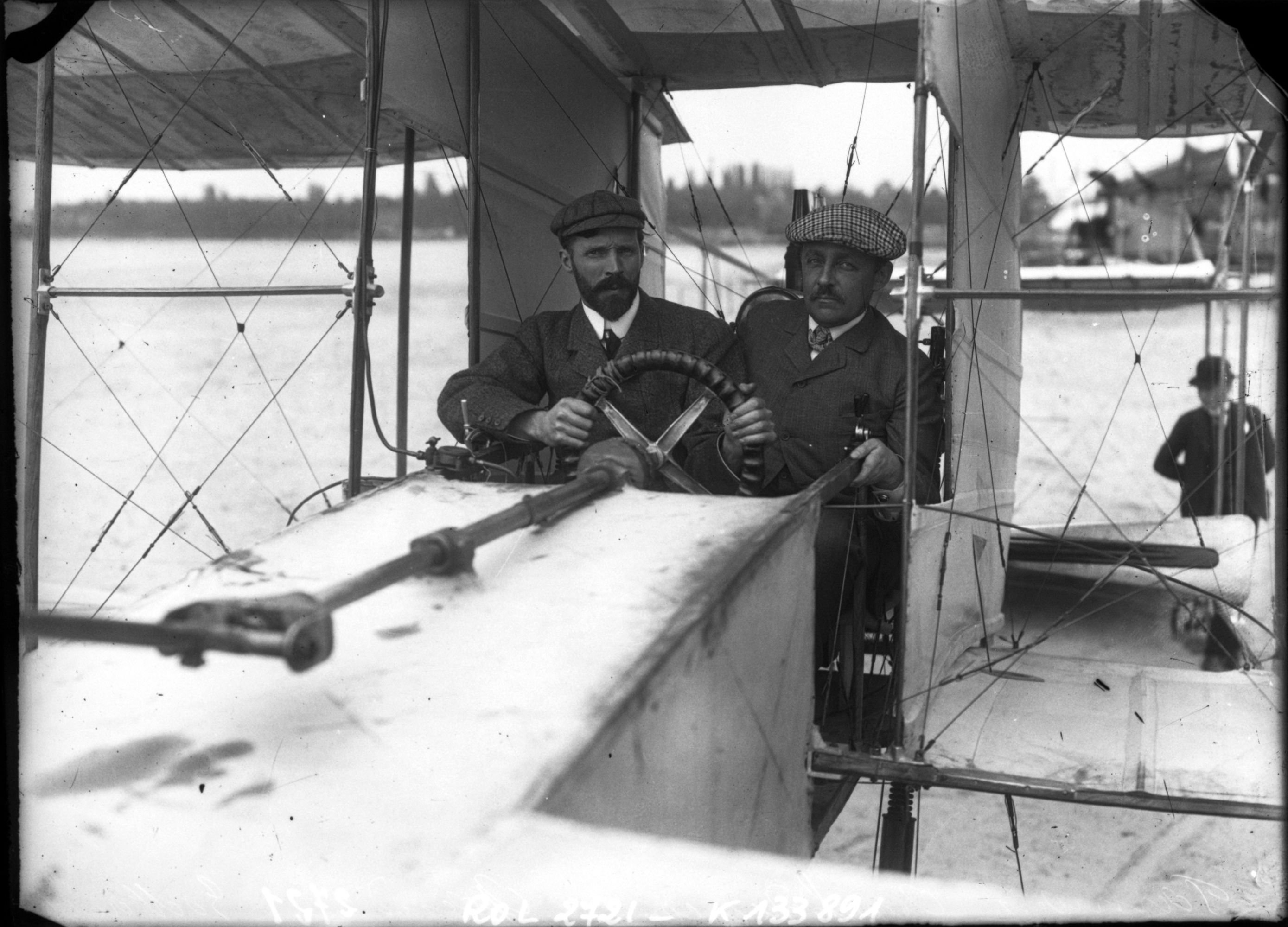
Farman and Archdeacon at Ghent, May 1908

In March 1908 a period of intense competition between Farman and Delagrange began, Delagrange now flying the new Delagrange II incorporating the modifications that had been made to Farman's aircraft, now renamed the Farman Ibis and with a new covering of "Continental" brand rubberised balloon fabric replacing the original varnished silk. On 21 March Farman set a new Aéro-Club de France record with a flight of just over 2 kilometres (1.25 miles). In the evening of the same day, Delagrange took Farman back to the hangar, making Farman the first fixed-wing aircraft "passenger". At the end of May Farman had also made the first flights in Europe with a passenger, carrying Ernest Archdeacon for 1,242 metres (4,075 ft) at Ghent.

This was bettered by Delagrange, first with a flight of 2.5 km (1.6 mi) on 10 April and the next day with a flight of 3.925 km (2.439 mi). In May both aircraft were fitted with side curtains between the inner set of interplane struts, and on 30 May, while giving a series of demonstration flights in Italy, he succeeded in making a flight of 12.750 km (7.922 mi) lasting 15 minutes 25 seconds. This time was bettered by Farman on 6 July, when he made a flight lasting 20 min 20 sec, a new record and winning Farman a 10,000 franc prize for the first officially observed flight lasting more than fifteen minutes.

The distinctive 'side curtains' between the outer two sets of interplane struts that were to become characteristic of subsequent production aircraft were added to both aircraft by the end of September. By 30 October, when Farman made a 27 km (17 mi) flight from Bouy to Reims, the first cross country flight in aviation history, ailerons had been added to his aircraft. Farman's last modification was to fit a third, shorter wing, in which form it became known as the Henry Farman Triplane.

=== Roll control ===
When Farman made his full-circle flight in January 1908 he had only rudder control, and made long, flat turns with the wings remaining nearly parallel to the ground. Gabriel Voisin, who was present, gives a different account in Revue Aeronautique Trimestrielle des Vieilles Tiges, reporting that it involved fairly steep banking and that it was Farman's experience in bicycle racing around steeply banked velodromes that gave him the courage to do the same in his aircraft.

In August 1908 Wilbur Wright demonstrated the importance of coordinated use of yaw (rudder) and roll (wing twisting) control for making non-slipped turns during his first flights in France at Le Mans. Consequently, when the Grande Semaine d'Aviation was held at Reims in August 1909 the Voisin biplanes were the only participating aircraft that lacked direct roll control thus demanding pilots trained to induce roll by rudder input. Although the best-represented type at the event, the Voisin biplanes achieved little success at the meeting. Subsequent Voisin designs, such as the Voisin Type de Course of 1910 and the Voisin Canard incorporated ailerons.

== Production aircraft ==
Farman finally ended his collaboration with Voisin Frères after a disagreement over an aircraft they had built to his specifications and then sold to John Moore-Brabazon, who named the aircraft the Bird of Passage. This caused Farman to start building aircraft himself, the first of which was the Farman III. The aircraft sold to Moore-Brabazon, which was to become typical of the production version of the aircraft, differed from the Farman I in having the gap between the wings increased to 2 m (6 ft 7 in), and was powered by a 37 kW (50 hp) E.N.V. water-cooled V-8 engine. Although it had the side curtains that had been added to the Farman I it did not have ailerons.

Armand Zipfel was one of the first to buy a Voisin aircraft, which he took to Berlin in January 1909 to make one of the first public demonstrations of heavier-than-air flight in Germany, organised by the Berliner Lokal Anzeiger.

French aviator Albert Kimmerling made what is possibly the first manned, heavier-than-air powered flight in Africa by taking off from the Nahoon Racecourse East London, South Africa in a Voisin on 28 December 1909.

Henri Brégi took two examples to Argentina and made the first aeroplane flight in Argentina on 6 February 1910.

Around sixty were eventually built, with a variety of engines according to the wishes of the buyer. Among these were the aircraft in which Captain Ferber was killed and the example flown by Louis Paulhan, which was the first aircraft to fly powered by a Gnome Omega rotary engine. Another example was bought by Harry Houdini, who took it to Australia and made a series of flights at Diggers Rest near Melbourne in March 1910. Although claimed to be the first flights made in Australia, some short flights had been made by Colin Defries in December 1909, but Houdini's flights are credited with being the first sustained and controlled flights made in Australia.

== Specifications ==
Data from Opdycke (1999) p.264

General characteristics

- Crew: 1
- Length: 13.45 m (44 ft 2 in)
- Wingspan: 10.80 m (35 ft 5 in)
- Wing area: 42 m^{2} (450 sq ft)
- Empty weight: 320 kg (705 lb)
- Gross weight: 550 kg (1,213 lb)
- Powerplant: 1 × Antoinette V8 water-cooled, 37 kW (50 hp)
- Propellers: 2-bladed Voisin

== See also ==
- Harry Houdini: The Aviator — Houdini's flight at Diggers Rest, Friday, 18 March 1910.

== Bibliography ==
- Gibbs-Smith, C.H. (1974). The Rebirth of European Aviation. London: HMSO. ISBN 0-11-290180-8.
- Hallion, Richard P. (2003). Taking Flight. New York: O.U.P. ISBN 0-19-516035-5.
- Opdycke, L. (1999). French Aeroplanes Before the Great War. Atglen, Pa.: Schiffer. ISBN 0-7643-0752-5.
- Sharpe, Michael (2000). Biplanes, Triplanes, and Seaplanes. London: Friedman/Fairfax Books. ISBN 1-58663-300-7.
- Taylor, M. J. H. (1989). Jane's Encyclopedia of Aviation. London: Studio Editions. p. 884.
- Villard, Henry Serrano (2002). Contact! : the story of the early aviators. Mineola, N.Y.: Dover. pp. 39–53. ISBN 0-486-42327-1.
- Vivian, E. C.; Lockwood, W. L. History of Aeronautics (1921). London: Collins. pp. 313–14. ISBN 9780585007847.
- Voisin, Gabriel (1963). Men, Women and 10,000 Kites. London: Putnam. (Translation of Mes 10,000 Cerfs-volants, 1960, Editions de la Table Ronde, Paris).
