= Early Birds of Aviation =

Organization devoted to the history of early pilots

Early Birds Logo - an organization dedicated to the history of early pilots

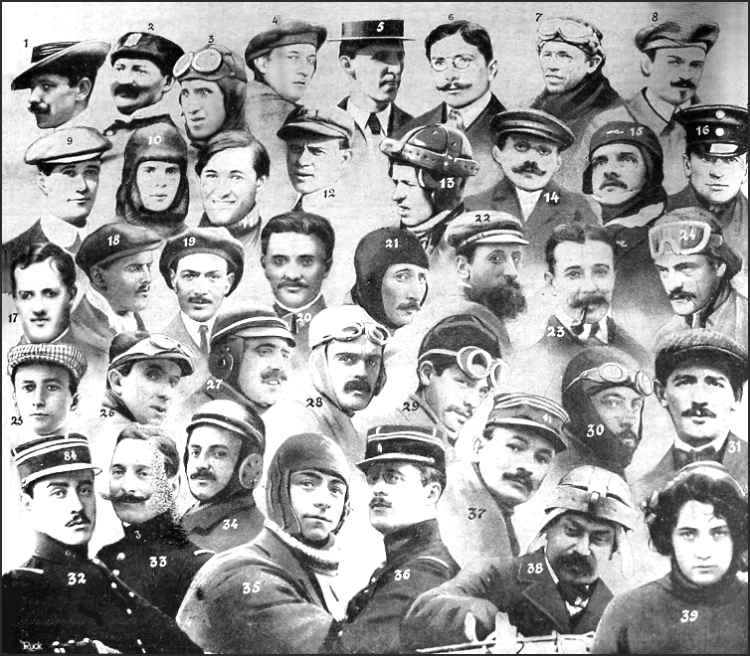
39 aviators who died between 1908 and 1912

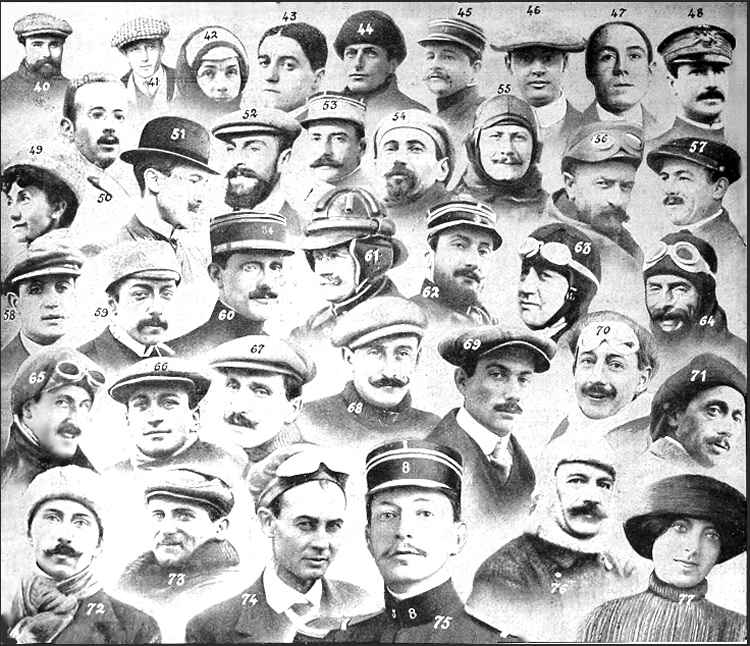
38 more aviators who died between 1908 and 1912

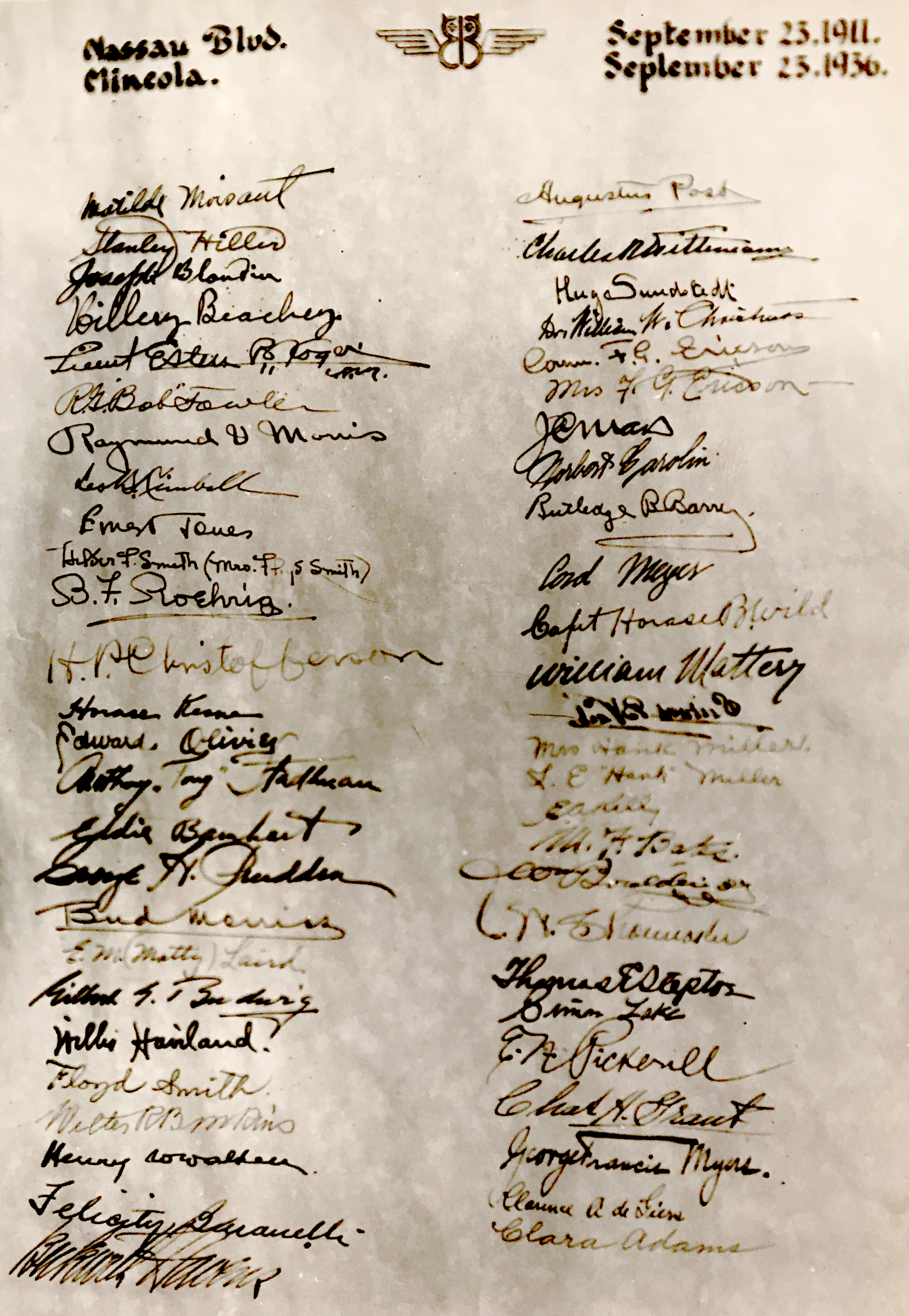
1936 signatures of Early Birds in recognition of the contribution of Earl Ovington to the First Regular Air Mail service, formally presented to his wife after his death.

The Early Birds of Aviation is an organization devoted to the history of early pilots. The organization was started in 1928 and accepted a membership of 598 pioneering aviators.

Membership was limited to those who piloted a glider, gas balloon, or airplane, prior to December 17, 1916, covering the entirety of the pioneer era of aviation, and just over two years into World War I. The cutoff date was set at December 17 to correspond to the first flights of Wilbur and Orville Wright. 1916 was chosen as a cutoff because a large number of people were trained in 1917 as pilots for World War I. Twelve of the aviators were women.

The original organization dissolved once the last living member had died. This occurred with the death of 99-year-old George D. Grundy Jr. on May 19, 1998. The organization was restarted and is devoted to collecting and publishing biographies on those who met the 1916 deadline. There were many pilots who soloed before the 1916 deadline who never applied to the club to be members. Some have been made honorary members.

== See also ==
- Aero Club of America
- List of fatalities from aviation accidents
- List of pilots awarded an Aviator's Certificate by the Aéro-Club de France in 1909
- List of pilots awarded an Aviator's Certificate by the Aéro-Club de France in 1910
