= Voisin X =

French WW1 bomber aircraft

Voisin X/10/LAR/LBR/E.54
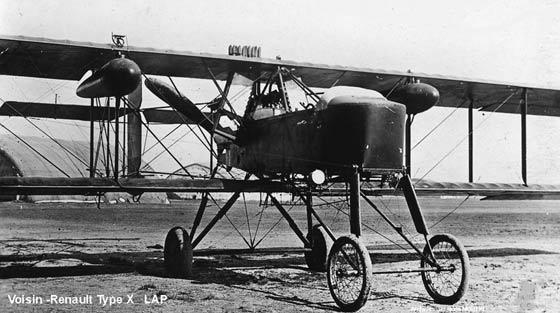

General information
- Type: Night Bomber & Reconnaissance
- Manufacturer: Voisin
- Designer: Gabriel Voisin
- Primary user: France Aéronautique Militaire
- Number built: approx 900 LAR & LBR built.

History
- Introduction date: 1917
- First flight: 1917
- Developed from: Voisin VIII

The Voisin X (sometimes written as Voisin 10) was a French two-seat pusher biplane which was built in two versions, one fitted with a 37 mm (1.46 in) Hotchkiss cannon (the LBR or X Ca.2), and the other as a conventional night bomber (the LAR or X Bn.2). Problems with the Peugeot engine in the previous Voisin VIII led to the installation of a new Renault engine of greater power and reliability, but the new aircraft was otherwise nearly identical to the VIII. Despite its obsolescence, it would make up the bulk of front line night bomber escadrilles until the end of the war.

== Development ==
With the failure of the 1915 and 1916 bomber contests to produce any usable types to replace the Voisin V, French aircraft manufacturing company Voisin was asked to produce an interim type pending the development of the next generation of bombers. This began with the Voisin VII which was itself an enlarged V, but was underpowered, and was soon followed by the Voisin VIII, which suffered severe reliability problems. As with the VIII, two versions were to be built, a night bomber, and an aircraft armed with a large single shot 37 mm (1.457 in) Hotchkiss cannon. By the time the X appeared, the cannon had been found to be of little use and most of those built as LBR/Ca.2s were converted into bombers with the cannons removed. Those LBRs fitted with the cannon had the pilot in the rear seat, while in the LAR, the pilot sat in the front seat, while the rear occupant could be equipped with a light machine gun such as a Lewis. On some aircraft, the observer's gun was mounted on a ring that was inclined forward to make forward movement easier against the wind.

Like the earlier Voisin models, dating back to the 1910 Type de Course, the Voisin X featured a robust steel-tube structure. The tubular structure was covered with aluminium sheet on the fuselage nacelle and doped fabric on the flying surfaces. The fuselage was square in section, with no attempt at reducing drag. The 3-bay wings had a constant chord and square tips, and the top wings were slightly greater in span than the lower wings. The cruciform tail was mounted on booms which tapered in plan view to a vertical knife edge that formed the rudder post. The all-flying rudder and elevator were aerodynamically balanced and had no fixed surfaces. Unusually for the period, and because it had no skid to drag it to a stop, it was equipped with drum brakes on the rear wheels. Like the Voisin VIII, the X was fitted with two large strut mounted teardrop fuel tanks that could be jettisoned in the event of a fire. Also, as with the VIII, the X was usually fitted with tall individual exhaust stacks projecting above the top wing. Due to the change from a V-8 to a V-12 there were additional stacks, and some examples had a muffler installed. A small additional aerodynamic counterbalance was sometimes also added at the bottom of the rudder.

== Operational history ==
=== French service ===
The first Voisin X's entered service with VB.114 in late 1917.

Due to their poor performance relative to contemporary fighters, when opposition was anticipated, operations were carried out at night. Voisin X's were used primarily as night bombers, attacking both strategic targets such as railyards, as well as carrying out tactical missions, such as suppressing enemy troop movements. 7 Bombing Groups (Groupes de Bombardment) were formed for this purpose. Voisin X's were also used for night reconnaissance, for which 6 escadrilles were specifically formed for this role.

Beginning in July 1918, the Voisin began being supplemented by the Farman F.50 in French front-line service, with surviving aircraft being transferred to newly created second line units, however examples remained in front line service until after the armistice. Examples still equipped a number of units in 1920 but by then in the process of being wound down.

=== Aerochir ===
While the British and Americans experimented with aerial ambulances, carrying a single stretcher in a Curtiss Jenny or Airco DH.4, in France, a Voisin X was converted into a complete mobile flying hospital, the Aerochir, complete with X-ray machines and other modern equipment for a full service operating room, so as to better support the mobile battlefield conditions created by the introduction of tank warfare.

=== Drone/autopilot ===
In 1918, a Voisin X made a fully automated 100 km flight without human assistance. A pilot was carried as a backup but wasn't found to be necessary. Four Sperry gyroscopes actuated electrical servo motors which controlled the flight surfaces and the engine throttle. During the flight, it changed altitude and direction multiple times, based on a preprogrammed course set with a series of switches. Testing resumed in 1923, for intended use as an auto-pilot.

== Variants ==
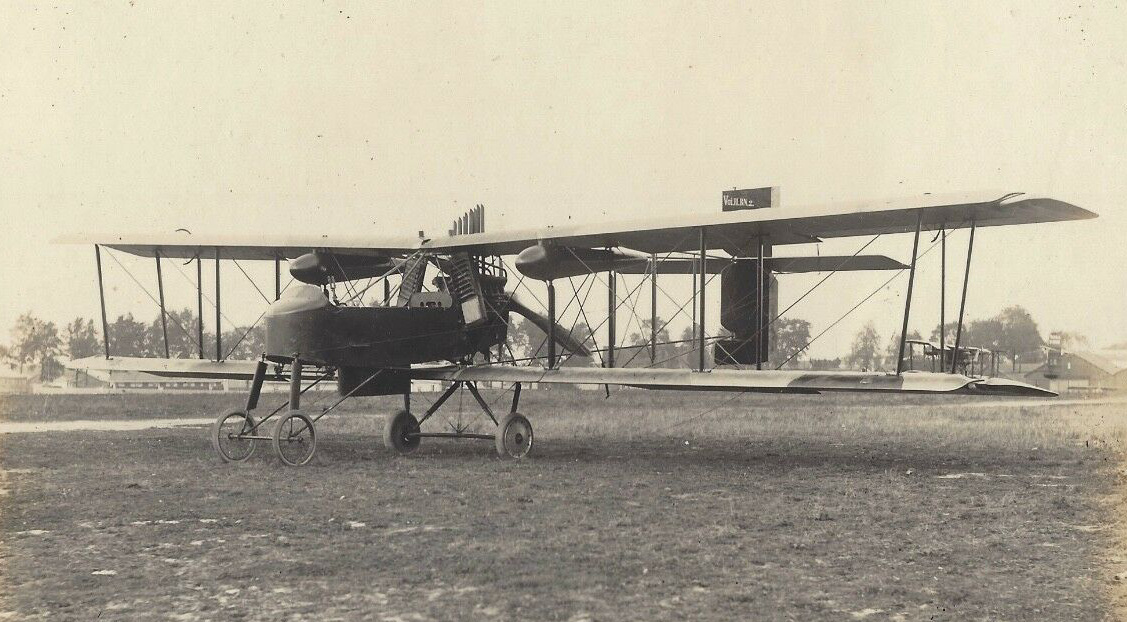
Voisin XI Bn.2

Voisin IX

- lightened one-off prototype with 160 hp (120 kW) Renault 8Gb for reconnaissance, with radiator in rounded nose
  - Voisin LC - factory designation for IX

Voisin X

- 280 hp (210 kW) Renault 12Fe
  - E.54 - factory designation for prototype
  - Voisin X Bn.2 - official designation for night bomber
  - Voisin X Ca.2 - official designation for cannon fighter
  - Voisin LAR - factory designation for X Bn.2 night bomber
  - Voisin LBR - factory designation for X Ca.2 armed with cannon

Voisin XI

- Development with 350 hp (260 kW) Panhard 12Bc and minor changes to proportions but only around 10 built

== Operators ==
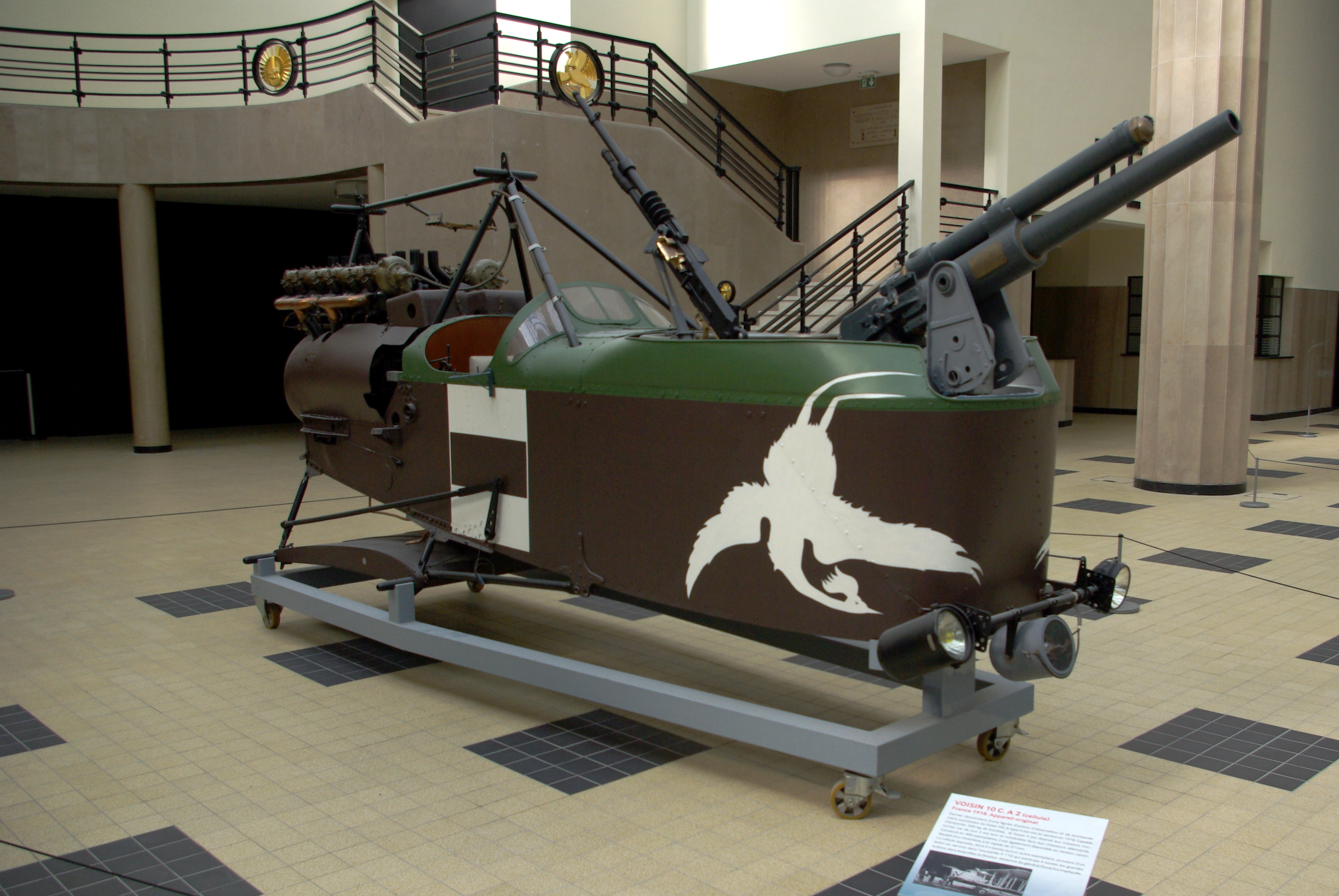
Fuselage to a Voisin X/LBR at the Musée de l'air et de l'espace showing the 37 mm (1.457 in) cannon

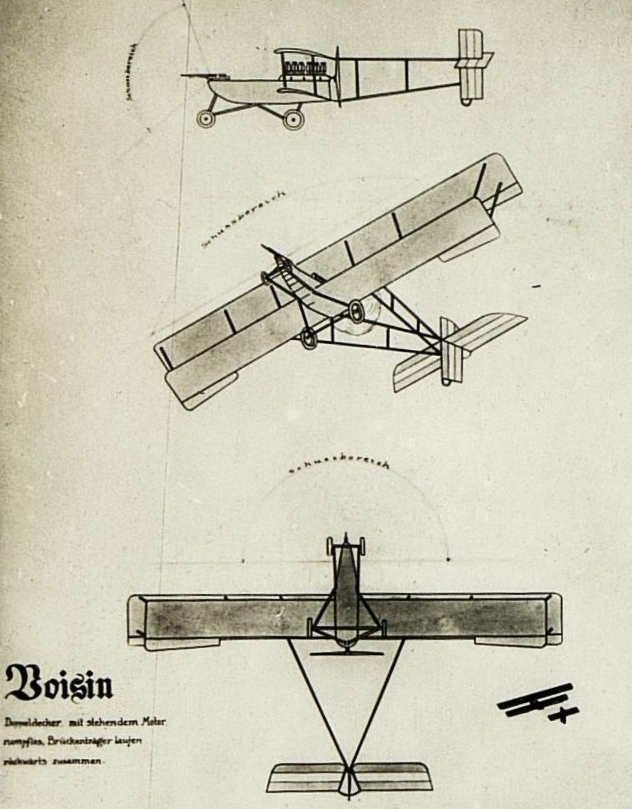
Enemy aircraft recognition drawing of Voisin

France

- Aéronautique Militaire
  - Night Reconnaissance
    - Escadrille VR.290 (8th Escadrille 4th RAO postwar)
    - Escadrille VR.291
    - Escadrille VR.292
    - Escadrille VR.293
    - Escadrille VR.294
    - Escadrille VR.295
    - Escadrille VR.296
  - Bombing
    - Group de Bombardment 1 (GB 1)
      - Escadrille V.25
      - Escadrille VC.110
      - Escadrille VB.114
      - Escadrille VC.116
      - Escadrille VB.135
      - Escadrille VB.136
      - Escadrille VB.137
    - Group de Bombardment 3 (GB 3)
      - Escadrille VB.109
      - Escadrille VB.113
    - Group de Bombardment 7 (GB 7)
      - Escadrille VR.118
      - Escadrille VR.119
      - Escadrille VR.121
    - Group de Bombardment 8 (GB 8)
      - Escadrille VB.109
      - Escadrille VC.116
      - Escadrille VB.125
    - Group de Bombardment 9 (GB 9)
      - Escadrille VB.125 (briefly)
    - Group de Bombardment 10 (GB 10)
      - Escadrille VB.101
      - Escadrille VC.116
      - Escadrille VB.133
    - Group de Bombardment 51 (GB 51)
      - Escadrille VB.135
      - Escadrille VB.136
      - Escadrille VB.137
      - scadrille VR.293
  - Théâtres d'Opérations Extérieurs (TOE) Overseas Theatres (mostly North Africa)
    - Escadrille VR.541
    - Escadrille VR.542
    - Escadrille VR.543
    - Escadrille VR.547
    - Escadrille VR.551
    - Escadrille VR.552
    - Escadrille VR.553
    - Escadrille VR.554
    - Escadrille VR.555
    - Escadrille VR.556
    - Escadrille VR.557
    - Escadrille VR.558
    - Escadrille VR.571

Czechoslovakia

- four examples used by 4 Letecka Setnina and Letecke Dilny, both at Cheb postwar.

United States

- American Expeditionary Force operated two examples as trainers in 1919.

== Survivors/Aircraft on display ==
- Musée de l'air et de l'espace has a fuselage of a Voisin X/LBR equipped with a 37 mm (1.457 in) Hotchkiss cannon.

== Specifications (Voisin X Bn.2/LAR) ==
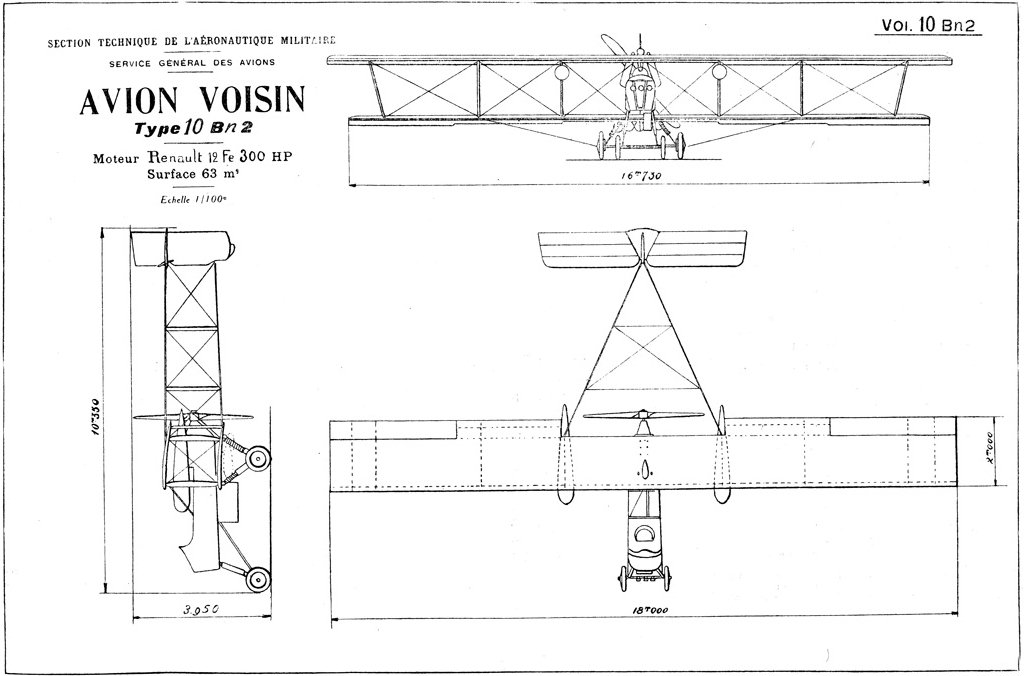
Voisin 10 3 view plan

Data from French Aircraft of the First World War

General characteristics

- Crew: 2
- Length: 10.35 m (33 ft 11 in)
- Wingspan: 17.90 m (58 ft 9 in)
- Height: 3.95 m (13 ft 0 in)
- Wing area: 61.14 m^{2} (658.1 sq ft)
- Empty weight: 1,400 kg (3,086 lb) LBR was 50 kg (110 lb) heavier.
- Max takeoff weight: 2,200 kg (4,850 lb)
- Powerplant: 1 × Renault 12Fe V-12 water-cooled pusher piston engine, 210 kW (280 hp)
- Propellers: 2-bladed Lumière or Régy, 3.12 m (10 ft 3 in) diameter wood fixed-pitch pusher propeller

Performance

- Maximum speed: 135 km/h (84 mph, 73 kn) at 2,000 m (6,600 ft), LBR was 5 km/h (3.1 mph; 2.7 kn) slower.
- Range: 350 km (220 mi, 190 nmi)
- Endurance: 5 hours
- Time to altitude: 20 minutes to 2,000 m (6,600 ft), LBR took 14 minutes 40 seconds to the same altitude.

Armament

- LAR equipped with one machine gun and 300 kg (660 lb) of bombs.
- LBR equipped with a 37 mm (1.457 in) Hotchkiss cannon

== See also ==
- 1917 in aviation

Related development

- Voisin VIII

Aircraft of comparable role, configuration, and era

- Breguet Bre.12
- Farman F.40
- Royal Aircraft Factory FE.2
- Savoia-Pomilio SP.3

Related lists

- List of bomber aircraft
- List of pusher aircraft by configuration
- List of military aircraft of France
- List of military aircraft of the Entente Powers in World War I
