= Voisin (aircraft) =

French aircraft manufacturing company

Société Anonyme des Aéroplanes G. Voisin
- Industry: Aerospace
- Founded: 1905
- Fate: dissolved
- Successor: Avions Voisin
- Headquarters: Billancourt, Paris, France
- Key people: Gabriel Voisin; Maurice Colieux
- Products: Aircraft

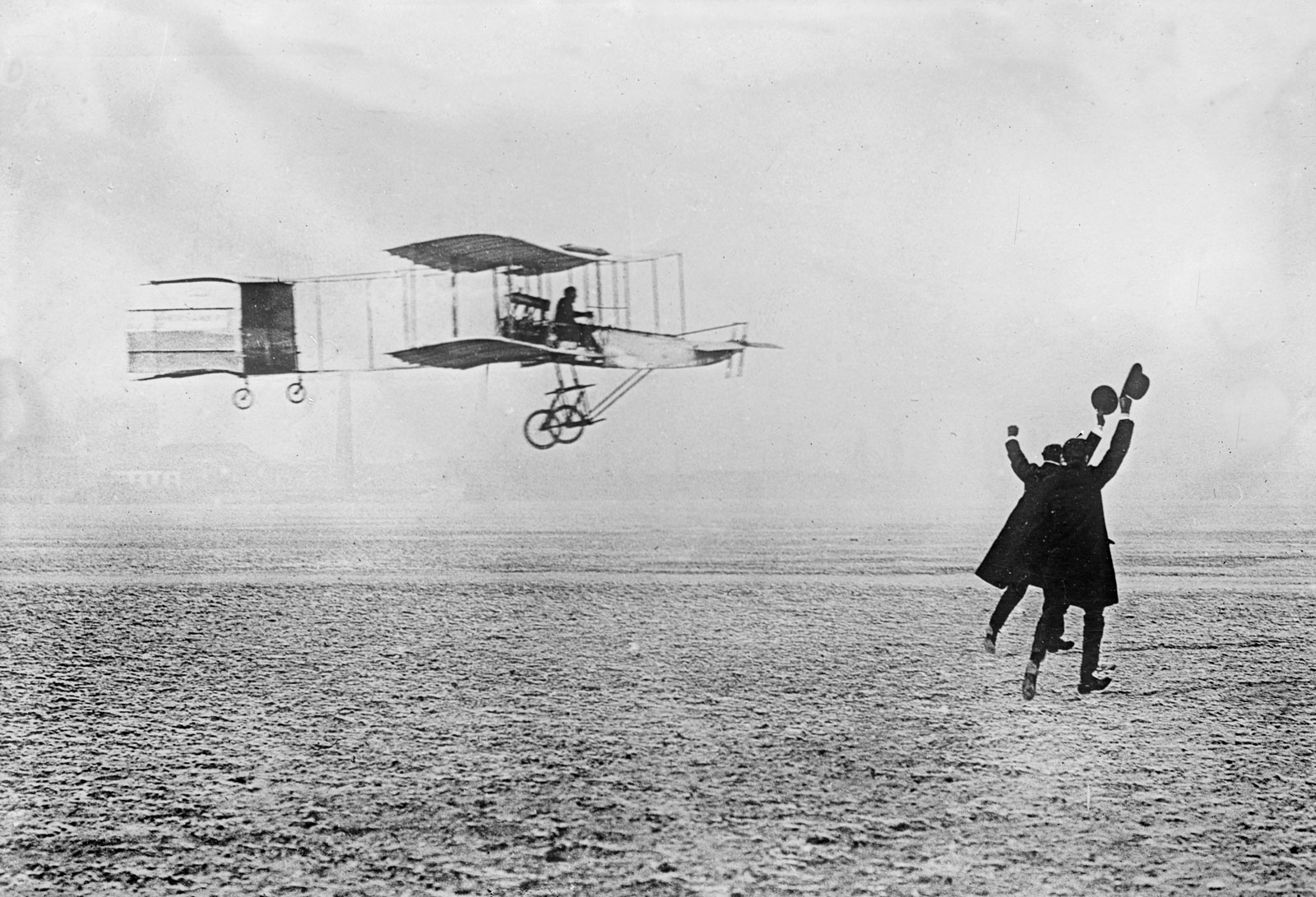
Voisin-Farman 1 completing the first closed-circuit kilometer flight in Europe.

Aéroplanes Voisin was a French aircraft manufacturing company established in 1905 by Gabriel Voisin and his brother Charles, and was continued by Gabriel after Charles died in an automobile accident in 1912; the full official company name then became Société Anonyme des Aéroplanes G. Voisin (Note: Gunston, 1993, says the full name was "Aéroplanes G. Voisin". On the other hand the avions-voisin.org webpage specifies the name as "Société Aéroplanes Voisin, Société Anonyme".) (English: Aeroplanes Voisin public limited company). During World War I, it was a major producer of military aircraft, notably the Voisin III. After the war Gabriel Voisin abandoned the aviation industry, and set up a company to design and produce luxury automobiles, called Avions Voisin.

== Early history ==
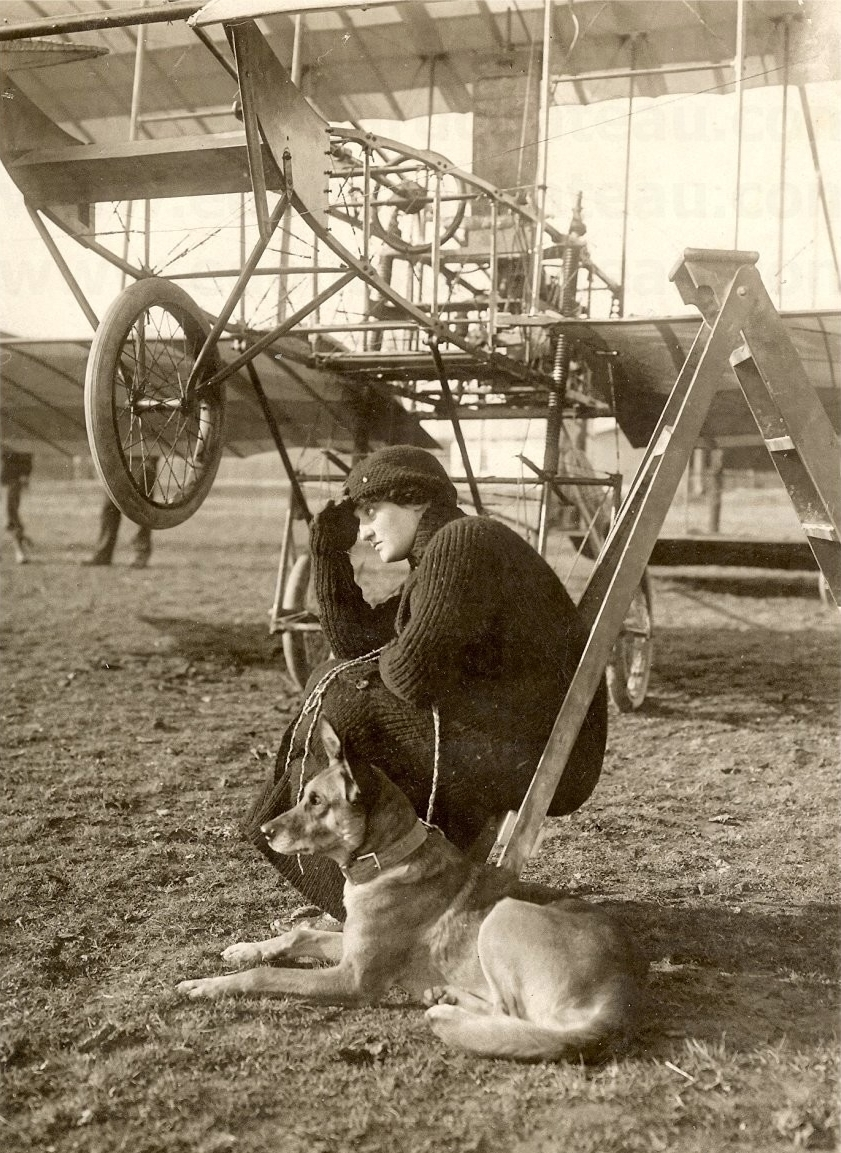
Raymonde de Laroche, first woman to earn a pilot's licence, with Voisin

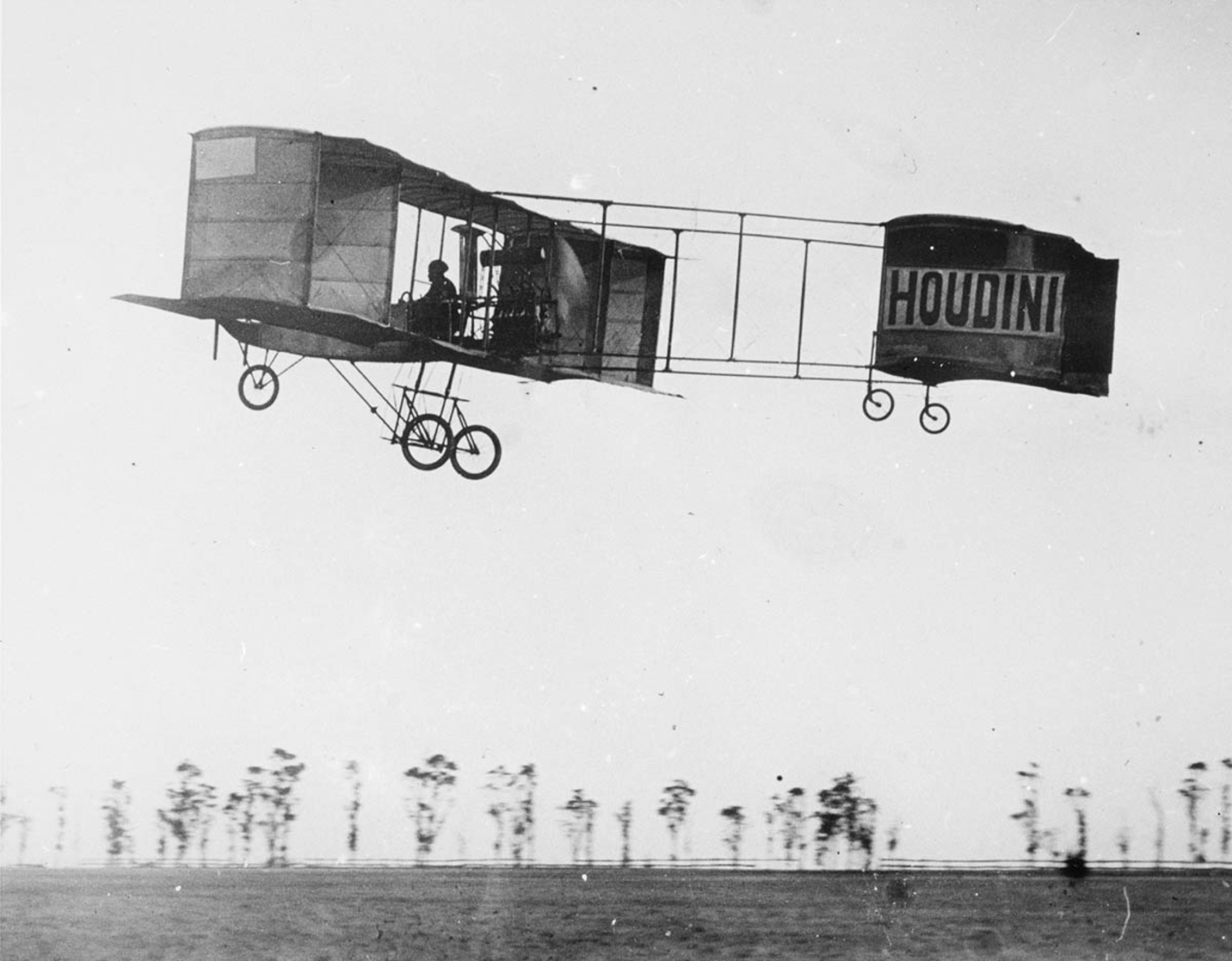
Harry Houdini in Voisin-Farman

Gabriel Voisin had been employed by Ernest Archdeacon to work on the construction of gliders and then entered into a partnership with Louis Blériot, to form the company Ateliers d' Aviation Edouard Surcouf, Blériot et Voisin in 1905. Following a disagreement, Gabriel Voisin bought out Blériot and on 5 November 1906 established with his brother Charles the Appareils d'Aviation Les Frères Voisin (English: Flying Machines of Voisin Brothers). The company, based in the Parisian suburb of Billancourt, was the first commercial aircraft factory in the world. It created the Voisin-Farman I, Europe's first manned, heavier-than-air powered aircraft capable of a sustained (1 km), circular, controlled flight, including take-off and landing. Having learned to fly with a Voisin, on 8 March 1910, Raymonde de Laroche became the first woman to receive a pilot's licence when the Aéro-Club de France issued her licence #36. In South Africa, on 28 December 1909, French aviator Albert Kimmerling made the first manned, heavier-than-air powered flight in Africa in a Voisin 1907 biplane.

Like many early aircraft companies, Voisin built machines to the designs of their customers which helped support their own experiments. The company's first customers were M. Florencie, who commissioned them to build an ornithopter he had designed, and Henri Kapferer, for whom they built a pusher biplane of their own design. The latter was underpowered, having a Buchet engine of only 20 hp (15 kW), and it failed to fly. However, Kapferer introduced them to Leon Delagrange, for whom they built a similar machine, powered by a 50 hp (37 kW) Antoinette engine. This was first successfully flown by Charles Voisin on 30 March 1907, achieving a straight-line flight of 60 m (200 ft). In turn Delagrange introduced them to Henri Farman, who ordered an identical aircraft. These two aircraft are often referred to by their owners' names as the Voisin-Delagrange No.1 (Note: marked on the side-curtains of the tail unit as Léon Delagrange No. 1) and the Voisin-Farman No.1, (Note: marked on the side-curtains of the tail unit as Henri Farman No. 1) and were the foundation of the company's success. On 13 January 1908 Farman used his aircraft to win the "Grand Prix de l'aviation" offered by Ernest Archdeacon and Henry Deutsch de la Meurthe for the first closed-circuit flight of over a kilometer. Since the Wright Brothers would provide no evidence of their own accomplishments, they were widely disbelieved at the time, so this was a major breakthrough in the conquest of the air, and brought Voisin many orders for similar aircraft. Around sixty would be built.

== Major Designs of 1907-1914 ==
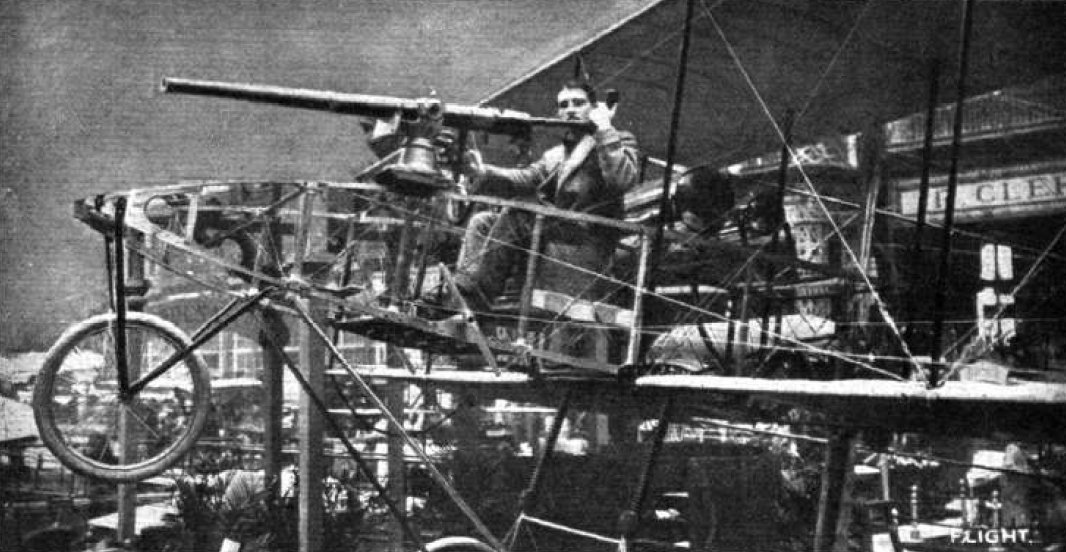
1910 experimental two-seater biplane with mitrailleuse fired by the passenger

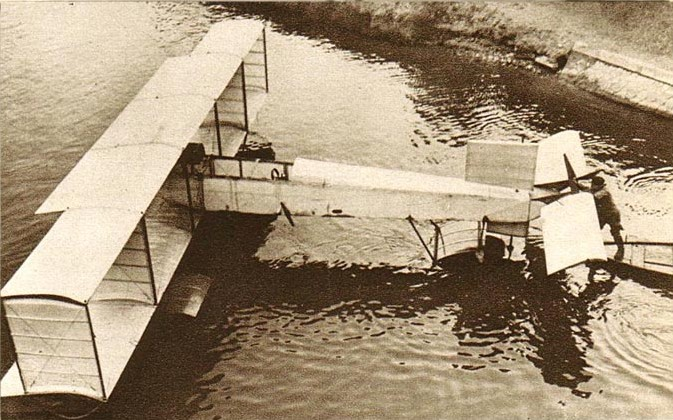
Voisin Canard floatplane on the Seine in 1911. The nose is to the right.

- 1907 Voisin 1907 biplane
- 1909 Voisin Tractor

Only one built.

- 1910 Voisin Type de Course
- 1910 Type Bordeaux
  - 1910 Voisin Type Militaire
  - 1911 Type de Tourism
- 1911 Voisin Canard

Tail first pusher design initially flown as a landplane but later fitted with floats. Examples were sold to the French and Russia Navies.

- 1912 Type Monaco

Smaller version of the Canard floatplane. Two were built to take part in the 1912 Monaco Aero Meeting.

- 1912 Voisin Icare Aero-Yacht

Flying boat built for Henry Deutsch de la Meurthe with a six-wheeled boat hull suspended below the wings.

- 1912 Voisin Type L or Voisin Type I & II

A pod and boom pusher biplane developed for the French Army's 1912 trials where it performed successfully. Some seventy were built in France along with around 400 in the Russian Empire.

- 1913 Voisin Canon

Six wheeled triple tailed pod and boom pusher armed with a 37mm Hotchkiss cannon

- 1914 Type LA or Voisin III

Development of the L with detail improvements but of the same general configuration.

== Voisin designs in World War I ==
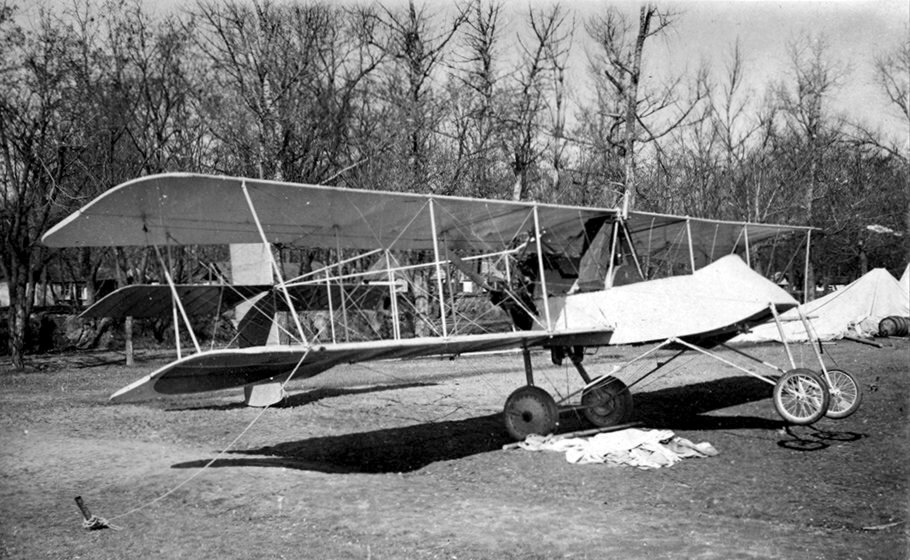
Voisin III

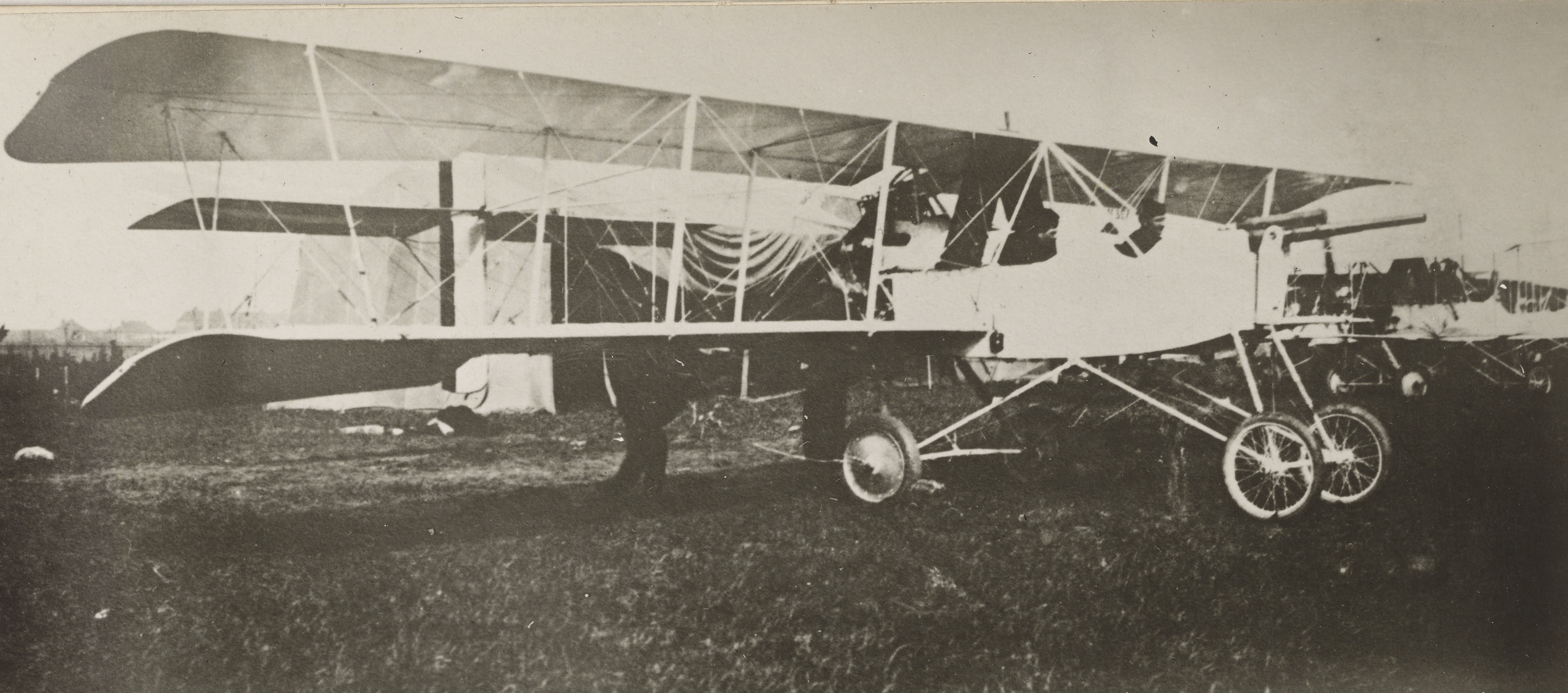
Cannon armed Voisin IV

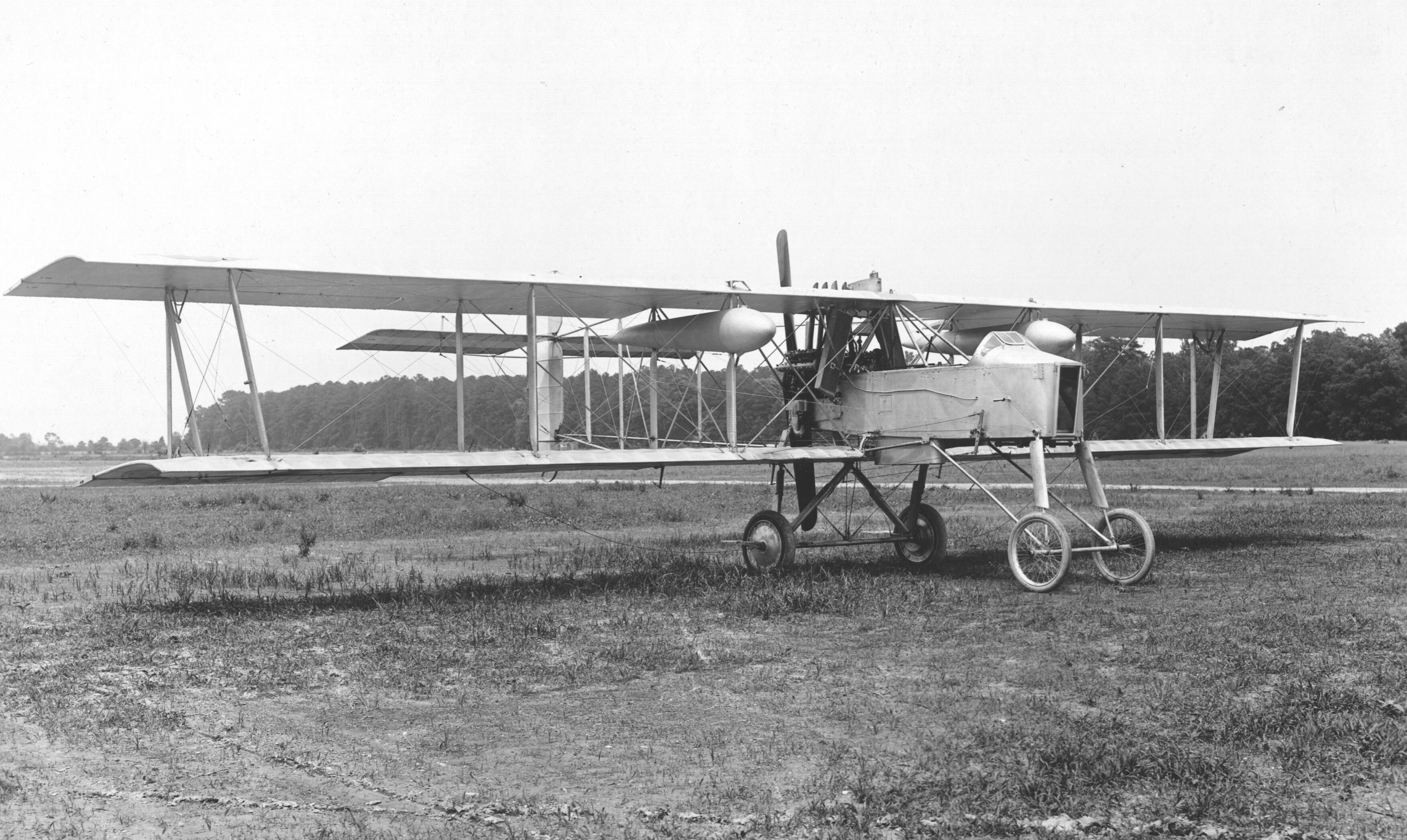
Voisin VIII in June, 1917

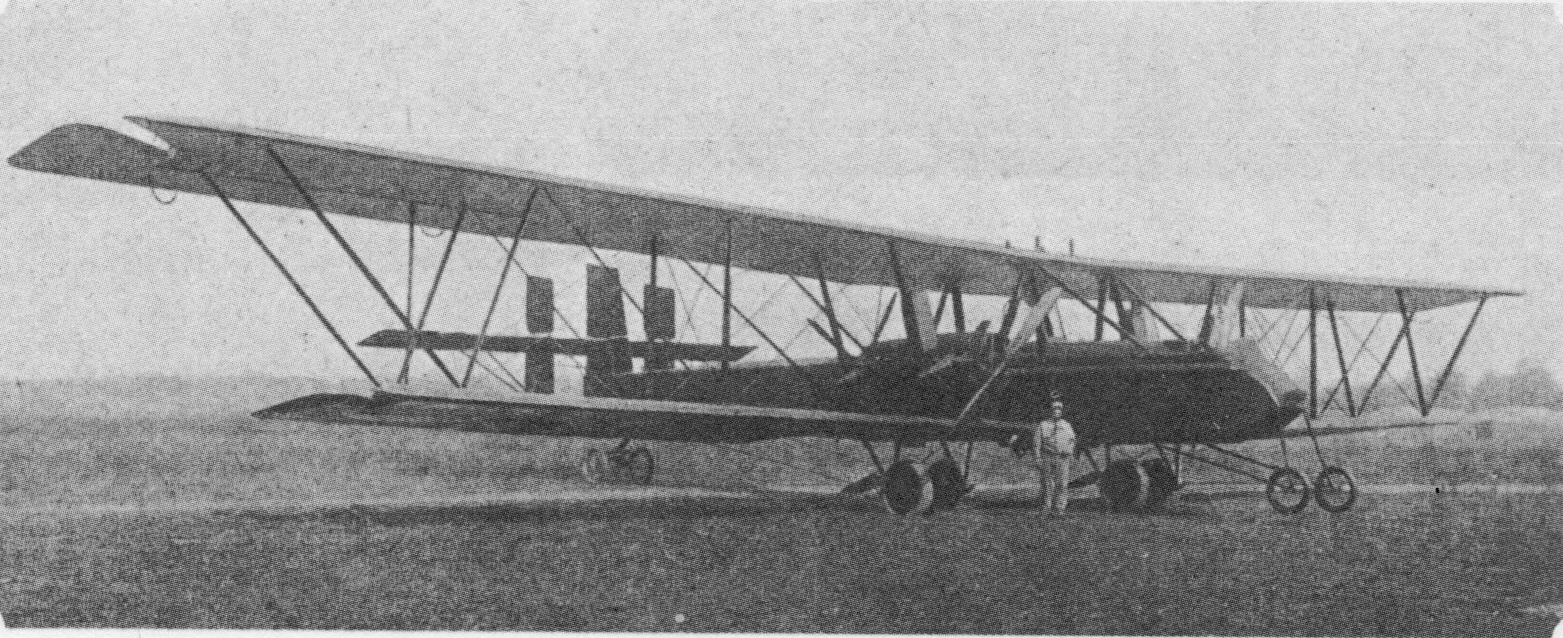
1918 Voisin XII

Production of the Voisin III Type LA and LAS increased with the outbreak of the First World War, with examples being built under licence in Italy by S.I.T., in Russia by Anatra, Breshnev-Moller, Dux Lebedev and Schetinin, and in the UK by Savages of King's Lynn, with production exceeding 1,350 airframes. Examples would also be used by the Belgian and Romanian Air Services, and a few even survived the war to be used in Ukraine, and in Russia. Soon after the outbreak of the First World War, it became apparent that the French aviation industry could not produce aircraft in sufficient numbers to meet military requirements. Manufacturers from various other fields became aviation subcontractors, and later license-builders as did many smaller aircraft manufacturers who had been unable to secure orders for their own designs. By 1918, Voisin was involved with the Voisin-Lafresnaye company, a major constructor of airframes, and the Voisin-Lefebvre company, a major builder of aircraft engines.

The Voisin III was followed by a small number of the 37mm cannon armed Voisin IV Type LB and Type LBS. The B in the factory designations indicate that the airframe was equipped with a cannon, although some had it removed in service. The S indicates that the engine was raised (surélevé) compared to the original installation.

Three hundred of the improved Voisin V Type LAS aircraft followed.

The Voisin VI Type LAS was a development of the V fitted with a 155 hp (116 kW) Salmson radial, of which only around 50 were built despite the improved performance as the basic type was considered to be obsolete.

The larger Type LC, Voisin VII, followed in 1916 with the engine cooling radiators moved to the nose, but was not a success as it was badly underpowered and only a hundred of these were built.

Voisin built a large Triplane powered by four 150 hp (110 kW) Salmson water-cooled aero-engines in 1915 with twin superimposed fuselage booms, however it attracted no orders, but its wings were reused in 1916 for the E.28 triplane bomber which was now powered by four 220 hp (160 kW) V8 Hispano-Suiza 8B engines, which likewise failed to secure any orders.

Also in 1915, Voisin built the Type M in which the fuselage was below the lower wing, and the engine filled the gap between the wings, however neither it, nor the otherwise similar twin fuselage Type O were successful.

Following the Voisin VII came the more powerful, and more successful Voisin VIII Type LAP and Type LBP. This was the French army's main night bomber in 1916 and 1917, with over one thousand built.

The Voisin IX, or Type LC (the designation was reused), was an unsuccessful lightened development of the VIII for a reconnaissance aeroplane, which lost out to the Salmson 2 and Breguet 14.

The Voisin X, Type LAR and Type LBR, was the Voisin VIII with a more reliable, lighter and more powerful 280 hp (210 kW) Renault 12Fe engine in place of the 220 hp (160 kW) Peugeot 8Aa used on the VIII. Deliveries were severely delayed, but some nine hundred were built before the end of the war. In 1918, a Voisin X (No. 3500) was used to create the Voisin 'Aerochir' ('Ambulance'). The aircraft was capable of flying a surgeon, together with an operating table and support equipment, including an x-ray machine and autoclave, into the battlefield. Under-wing panniers could carry 800 lb (360 kg) of equipment. Another X was converted into a drone, and flown in 1918 and again in 1923.

The Voisin XI was a development of the X powered by a 350 hp (260 kW) Panhard 12Bc, with a slightly longer wingspan and assorted detail changes. Only about 10 were built and it did not see service.

The final Voisin design, the Voisin XII, was successful in trials in 1918 for the BN2 bomber competition, but with the end of the war, no production was ordered. The Voisin XII was a large, four-engined biplane night bomber. Several projects for heavy bombers for the next bomber specification (BN3/4) may have been based on the XII, but fitted with larger Salmson or Hispano-Suiza engines, but were not built.

In the 1930s, a glider was built by a Louis Voisin, however he had no connection to Gabriel Voisin.

== Post World War I ==
After 1918, Gabriel Voisin abandoned the aviation industry in favor of automobile construction under the name Avions Voisin.
