= Voisin VIII =

French WW1 bomber aircraft

Voisin VIII/LAP/LBP
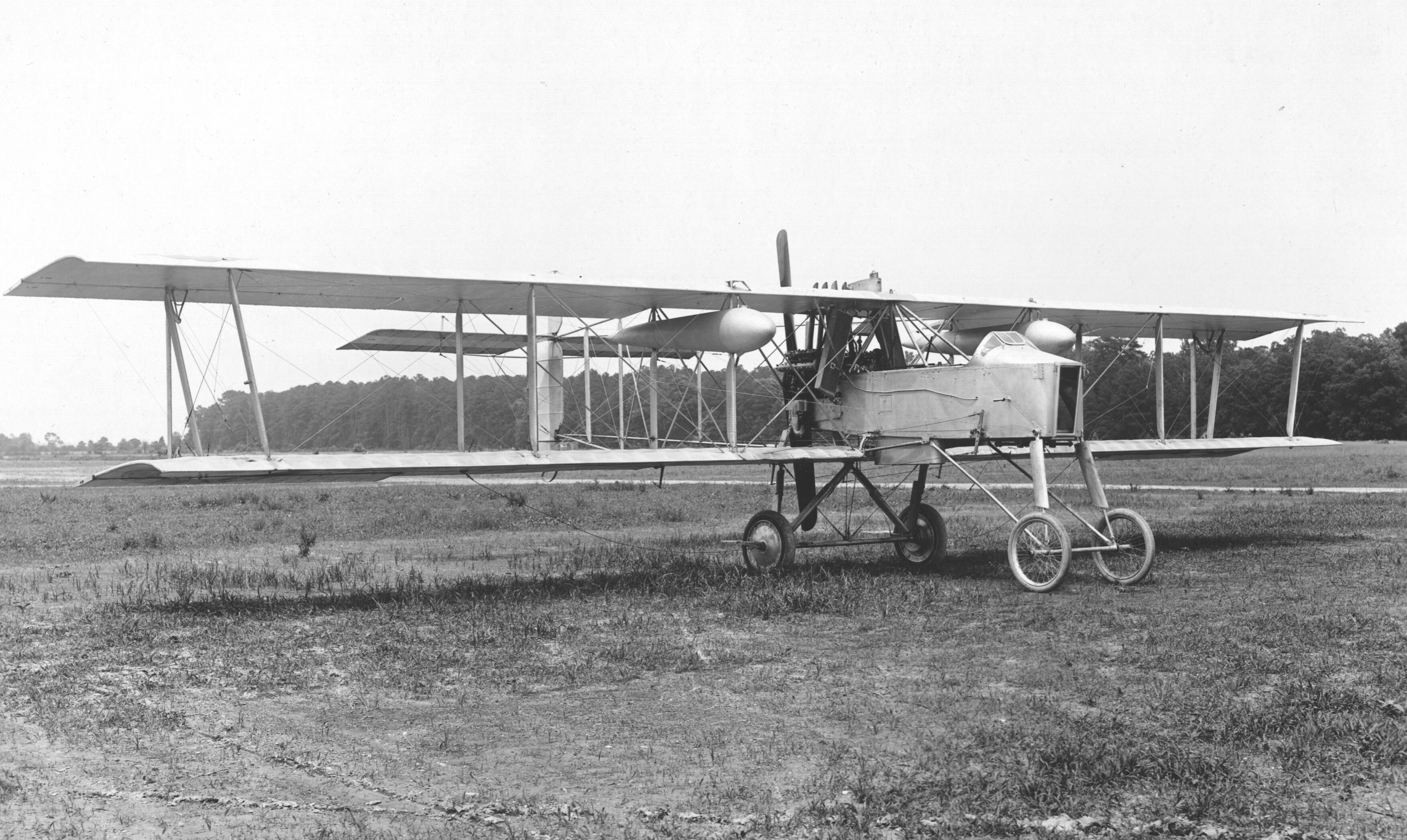
- Voisin LAP

General information
- Type: Night Bomber
- Manufacturer: Voisin
- Designer: Gabriel Voisin
- Primary user: France Aéronautique Militaire
- Number built: approx 1,100 LAP & LBP built.

History
- Manufactured: 1916-1917
- Introduction date: November 1916
- First flight: 1916
- Retired: 1918
- Developed from: Voisin VII
- Developed into: Voisin X

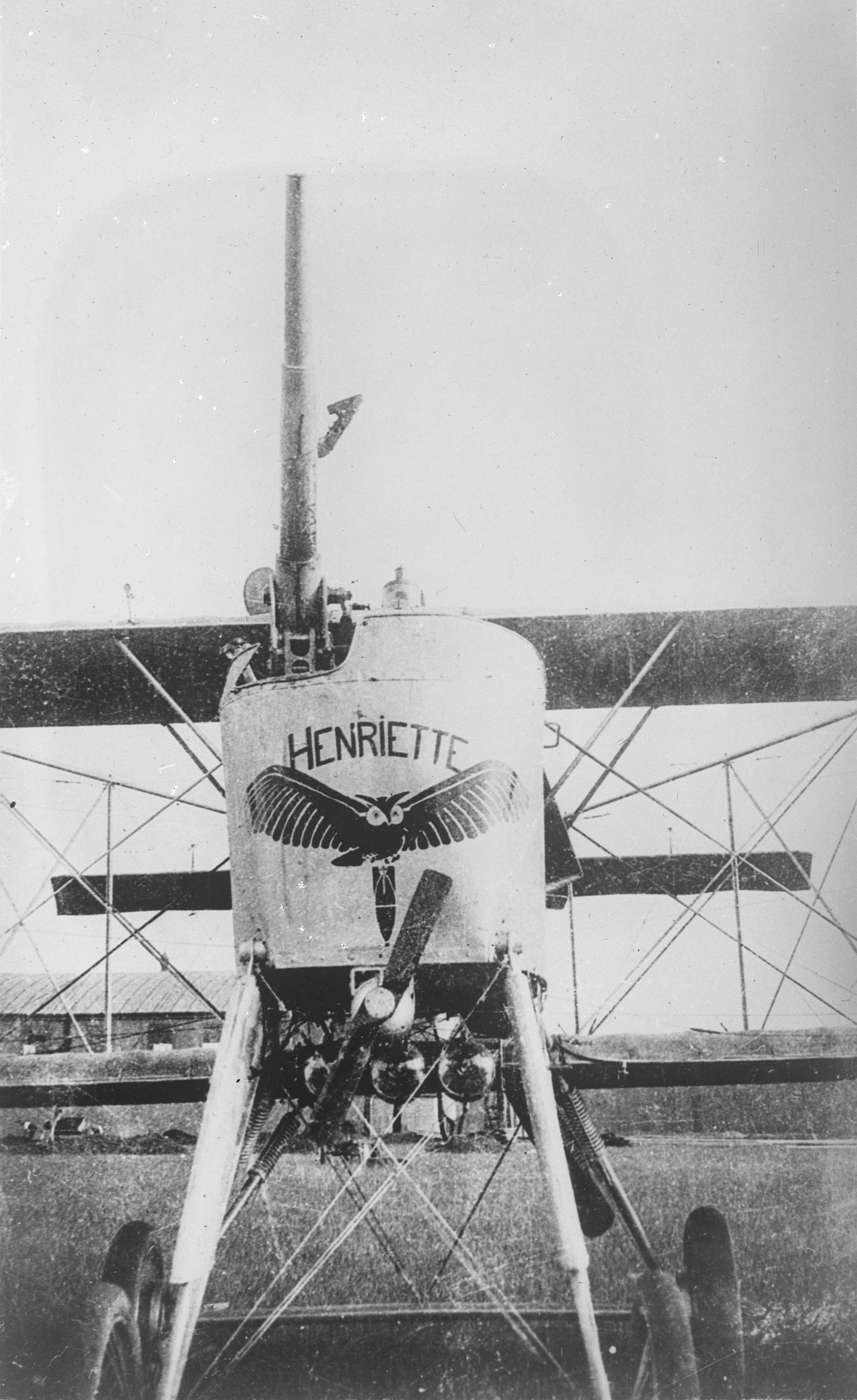
37 mm Cannon installed on Voisin LBP

The Voisin VIII is a French two-seat biplane pusher which was built in two versions, one fitted with a 37mm Hotchkiss cannon (the LBP or Ca.2), and the other as a conventional bomber (the LAP or Bn.2). Problems with the Peugeot 8Aa engine led to a short operational career with front line units before being superseded by the Voisin X, which aside from the installation of a new Renault engine, was nearly identical to the VIII.

== Development ==
With the failure of the 1915 and 1916 bomber contests to produce any usable types to replace the Voisin V, French aircraft maker Voisin was asked to produce an interim type pending the development of the next generation of bombers. This was based partly on the preceding Voisin VII which was itself an enlarged V, but was to be powered by a larger engine as the VII was found to be underpowered, and would dispense with the nose radiator, reverting to drag-inducing side radiators.

Two versions were to be built, a conventional bomber, and an aircraft armed with a large single shot 37mm Hotchkiss cannon as was used on the Voisin IV. Initially it was thought the cannon would be used for air-air attacks and was officially designated a cannon fighter (Ca.2) however this was found to be unworkable as both bomber and fighter types were vulnerable to fighters as they were too slow and unmaneuverable but at least one enemy aircraft was destroyed — with a single shot. As a result, a variety of other roles were attempted with it. Flying artillery, using indirect shots were impossible to aim accurately, balloon busting highlighted the type's vulnerability to anti-aircraft artillery fire, but some success was found when used in the ground attack firing directly at the target. Many had their cannons removed while in operational service but at least one was armed with additional machine guns. The LBP with the cannon had the pilot in the rear seat, while in the LAP, the pilot sat in the front seat, while the rear occupant could be equipped with a light machine gun such as a Lewis. On some aircraft, the observer's gun was mounted on a ring that was tilted to make movement forward easier against the wind. Unlike with the Voisin IV, installation of the cannon did not require that the top wing be staggered forward to maintain fore-aft balance.

Like the earlier Voisin models, dating back to the 1910 Type de Course, the Voisin VIII featured a robust steel-tube structure. Unusually for the period, and because it had no skid to drag it to a stop, it was equipped with drum brakes. These were fitted to the rear wheels. Like the Voisin VII, the VIII was fitted with two large strut mounted teardrop fuel tanks that could be jettisoned in the event of a fire. Due to problems with exhaust ventilation on the VII, the VIII and later types were fitted with tall individual exhaust stacks projecting above the top wing.

== Operational history ==
=== French service ===
By the start of 1917, the Voisin VIII made up the bulk of the Aviation Militaire's night bombing force having gradually replaced the preceding Voisin V's and fully equipped two Groupes de Bombardment (GB 1 & GB 3) before the unreliability of their engines resulted in them being gradually replaced by French-built Sopwith 1½ Strutters and the higher powered Voisin Xs, and withdrawn to secondary units, which continued to operate them until the end of the war. The l'Aéronavale/Aviation Maritime operated 20 Voisin VIIIs.

=== American service ===
Based on the experiences of some Americans serving with these aircraft, the United States' American Expeditionary Force planned to field a single night bomber unit equipped with the Voisin VIII, however only a training unit was formed before the war ended.

=== British service ===
The Royal Naval Air Service purchased two examples for trials work, one fitted with the cannon, and one of the bomber types, however no further examples were purchased.

== Variants ==
Voisin VIII

- 220 hp (160 kW) Peugeot 8Aa
  - Voisin LAP - factory designation for VIII night bomber
  - Voisin LBP - factory designation for VIII armed with 37 mm (1.457 in) cannon

== Operators ==
France

- Aéronautique Militaire
  - Ecole Militaire d'Avord
  - VB.101
  - V.481/551 operated alongside Letord 4 & 5
  - G.482 operated alongside Caudron G.6 aircraft
  - VB.483
  - V.484
  - Let.485 operated alongside Letord 4 aircraft
  - V.486
  - V.487 operated alongside Letord 4 & 5 aircraft
  - V.491 operated alongside Letord 4 aircraft
  - GB 1
    - VB.110
    - VB.114 first unit to receive type
  - GB 3
    - VB.107
    - VB.108
    - VB.109
    - VB.113
- l'Aéronavale/Aviation Maritime
  - CAM de Dunkerque

United Kingdom

- Royal Naval Air Service

United States

- American Expeditionary Force

== Survivors ==
- National Air and Space Museum has a Voisin VIII/LAP bomber on display
- Musée de l'air et de l'espace has a fuselage of a Voisin X/LBR equipped with a cannon.

== Specifications ==
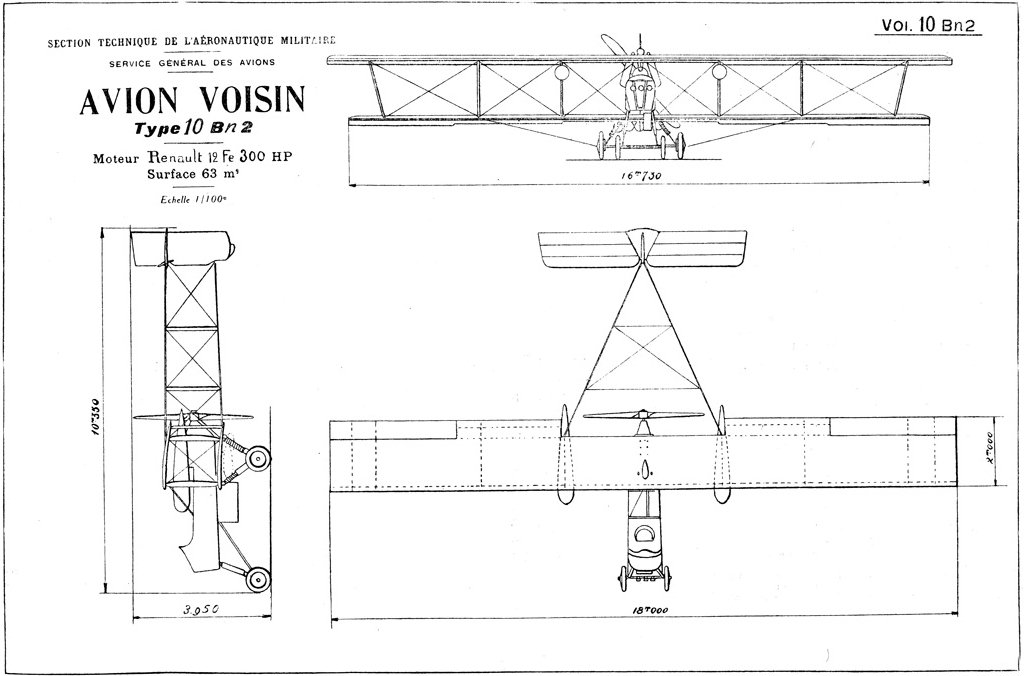
Voisin 8/10 3 view plan

Data from French Aircraft of the First World War

General characteristics

- Crew: 2
- Length: 10.35 m (33 ft 11 in)
- Wingspan: 18.00 m (59 ft 1 in)
- Height: 3.95 m (13 ft 0 in)
- Wing area: 61.14 m^{2} (658.1 sq ft)
- Empty weight: 1,310 kg (2,888 lb)
- Max takeoff weight: 1,860 kg (4,101 lb)
- Powerplant: 1 × Peugeot 8Aa V-8 water-cooled pusher piston engine, 160 kW (220 hp)
- Propellers: 2-bladed Voisin 1 or Voisin 3 wood fixed-pitch pusher propeller, 3.50 m (11 ft 6 in) diameter

Performance

- Maximum speed: 118 km/h (73 mph, 64 kn) @ 2,000 m (6,561.68 ft)
- Range: 350 km (220 mi, 190 nmi)
- Endurance: 4 hours
- Service ceiling: 4,300 m (14,100 ft)
- Time to altitude: 17 mins to 2,000 m (6,600 ft)

Armament

- LAP equipped with one machine gun and 180 kg (400 lb) of bombs.
- LBP equipped with a 37 mm (1.457 in) Hotchkiss cannon

== See also ==
- 1916 in aviation

Aircraft of comparable role, configuration, and era

- Breguet Bre.12
- Farman F.40
- Royal Aircraft Factory FE.2
- Savoia-Pomilio SP.3

Related lists

- List of bomber aircraft
- List of pusher aircraft by configuration
- List of military aircraft of France
- List of military aircraft of the Entente Powers in World War I
