= Ernest Henry (engineer) =

Swiss mechanical engineer (1885–1950)

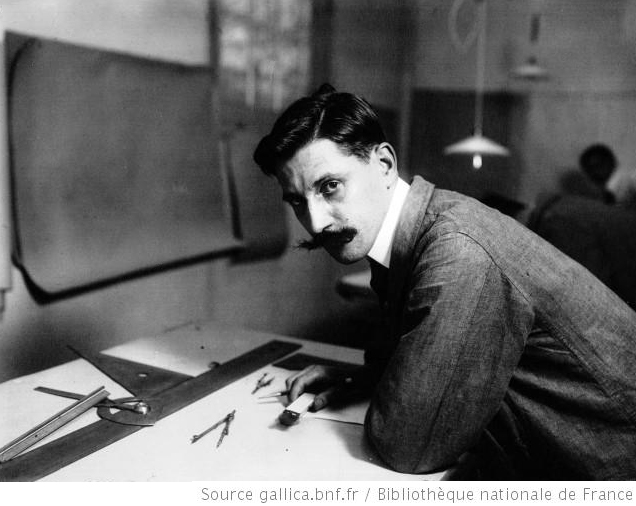
- Born: 1885; Geneva, Switzerland
- Died: 1950 (aged 64–65); Paris, France
- Occupation: Automotive engineer
- Known for: Creator of first 4-valve DOHC engine

Ernest Henry (1885 in Geneva, Switzerland – 1950 in Paris, France) was a mechanical engineer. He developed auto racing engines, and is especially well known for his work for Peugeot and Ballot, who dominated Grand Prix auto racing from 1912 to 1921. His engine design directly influenced Sunbeam Racing cars as early as 1914; the 1921 Grand Prix Sunbeams owe much to his work with Ballot and the 1922 Grand Prix Sunbeams were designed by him.

His engine operational architecture was the precursor of modern engines. One biographer called him "perhaps the most brilliant engine designer ever"; another described one of his designs as "so technically advanced it could have landed from outer space". Henry's "theory, design and execution" of twin-cam engines was to guide engine development in Europe and then around the world for the next century.

== Early life and education ==
After studying Applied Mechanics at Technicum School of Engineering at Haute École du paysage, d'ingénierie et d'architecture de Genève, Ernest Henry worked starting in 1906 on marine engines for Picker of Geneva, then moved to Paris in 1909, serving the Motos Labor manufacturing company (marine and aviation engines), before joining the ranks of Peugeot in 1911.

== At Peugeot ==
Robert Peugeot integrate it shortly after the team called "Les Charlatans" (a name given to the team by technical managers at the Peugeot factory in Beaulieu and who were opposed to this conception of race car), then composed the official Peugeot drivers Jules Goux, Georges Boillot and Paul Zuccarelli, who had left Hispano-Suiza. This group had managed to convince Robert Peugeot, whose firm Lion-Peugeot had, in 1910, merged with institutions Peugeot of Audincourt, and this new leader of business, engage in the study and the financing of project race car, modern, for the Grand Prix of the Automobile Club de France (ACF) and the Coupe de l'Auto of 1912.

Ernest Henry, who was then 27 years old, started from a drawing board and a blank page in the racing department, working in secret in Suresnes (in Rossel's former factory), with a budget allocated by the Peugeot factory Through skill and ingenuity Ernest Henry would materialize innovative ideas and sometimes a little iconoclastic team. He wanted to get high speeds through the use of double camshaft in head-driven shaft with a bevel at each end. The engine born in early 1912 featured inclined actuating four valves for each of the four cylinders, a very good four-cylinder twin camshaft cylinder head with hemispherical combustion chambers, 4 valves per cylinder arranged in V, and 7.6 liter capacity.

As the chassis of this car was also much lighter and held the road better than the monsters of the early ages, the new Peugeot first grand prix car, quickly became the car to beat, with improved tires it could reach 190 km/h (120 mph).

These cars would be entered at the French Grand Prix: the type L76 (L for Lion) unlimited class, with a displacement of 7.6 liters, and the type L3 for three-liter restricted Coupe de l'Auto competition.

Peugeot L76 and L3 emerged as winners of the 1912 French Grand Prix in Dieppe, the Mont Ventoux Hill Climb (the record), the Coupe de l'Auto, Circuit of Ardennes, the meeting of Boulogne, and Coupe de la Sarthe. Thus the ideas of the team and the quality of work done by Ernest Henry achieved victory over everything before them.

With those engines, Ernest Henry could claim the undisputed paternity landmark in the history of the automobile. They were not the first "4 valves per cylinder" or the first "dual overhead cam head," but they were the first in the world to combine the two techniques. All the most powerful racing engines recapitulate this formula, which became universal in production automobiles.

In 1913, the 5.6-liter and 3-liter engines were further developed with camshaft timing, previously carried by shaft and bevel, now carried out by a cascade of gears, and lubrication was amended by adding a dry sump.

=== World's First DOHC Motorcycle ===
In 1914 Henry adapted his automobile engine design for a new 500 cc straight-twin engine racing motorcycle. The Peugeot 500 M racing motorcycle was the world's first motorcycle to use a double overhead camshaft cylinder head; the twin camshafts were driven by a cascade of gears between the cylinders, and used 4 valves per cylinder. The new machine was first raced in April 1914 on the Rambouillet circuit, and in June, during the Automobile Club de France's ‘Records Day’ in Fontainebleau, it exceeded 122kmh (75 mph) over a measured kilometer and 121kmh (74 mph) over the measured mile. The engine was incredibly sophisticated for the time.

The Peugeot factory estimates that 3 of the 1914 500M racers were built, although none appear to have survived today. The original factory drawings for this motor were discovered in 1998 by Emile Jacquinot (a documentation specialist for the Peugeot Museum) at the Peugeot family home in Valentigny. Working in concert with the Peugeot Museum, engineer Jean Boulicot built a replica of the 1914 500M over 10 years, with the finished machine debuting at the Coupe Motos Legende event in 2010.

=== Henry's engines in the Indianapolis 500 ===
1913 would be a great year in the history of Peugeot and the French automobile. On May 30 Jules Goux driving a L76 (with engine displacement reduced to 7.3 L to respect the rules of the race), won the 1913 Indianapolis 500, 804.5 km to 122.155 km/h average. This was the first victory for the French auto manufacturer in the United States, and had an enormous impact on both sides of the Atlantic, especially this victory was acquired in front of the world's automotive "who's who". The new 5.6-liter took first and second place at the French Grand Prix won at Mont Ventoux, and a streamlined L76 set a new world record speed of 170.94 km/h at Brooklands Motor Circuit and won several other records on the same circuit in the hands of Goux and Boillot.

In the 1914 Indianapolis 500, 2.5-liter and 4.5-liter engines were installed, while maintaining the same technical design. Results were not as bright as in 1913, due to technical problems (especially tires) rather than mechanical. Peugeot nevertheless took second and fourth place: Arthur Duray in the 3-liter class and Jules Goux in the 5.6-liter class.

Georges Boillot lead the Mercedes armada with his 4.5-liter engine until the last lap of the historic 1914 French Grand Prix run July 4, 1914, a month before the First World War. He dropped out, after taking serious risks, due to the many stops caused by defective tires.

In the 1915 Indianapolis 500, Peugeot placed second with the same type vehicle as that of 1914, with the 4.5 L engine, driven by Dario Resta and won the 1916 Indianapolis 500 at an average speed of 133.994 km/h. Peugeot's third victory at Indianapolis was won in 1919 when the glorious 4.5 (1914) by Howard Wilcox and Jules Goux took first and third place respectively. The L25 won the Targa Florio in 1919.

The technical advances of Henry's engine designs allowed them to win races five years after their creation.

=== World War I ===
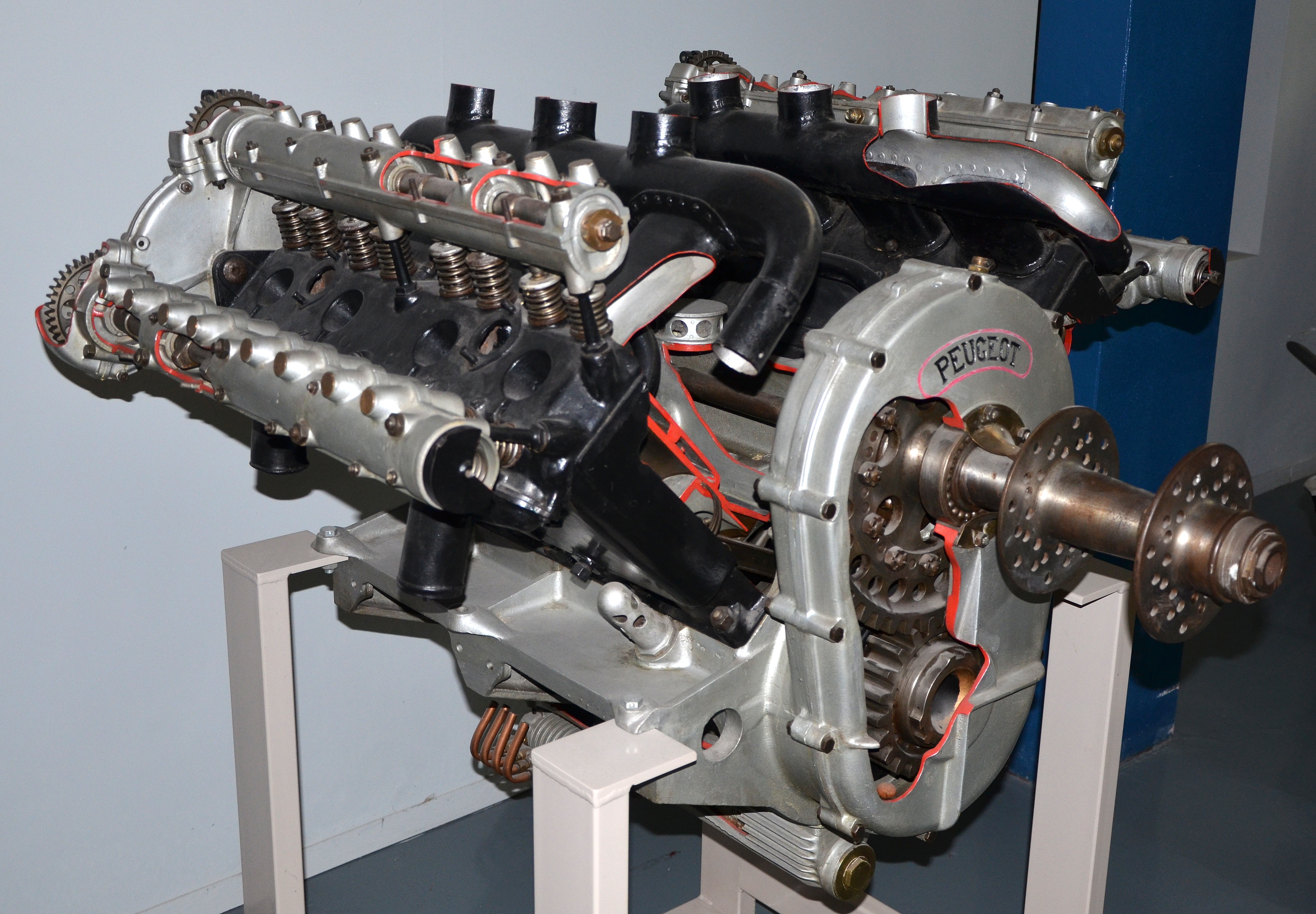
A partially cutaway Peugeot 8Aa engine on display at the Air and Space Museum in Paris

Peugeot's racing team disbanded during World War I. Henry went on to design the Peugeot 8Aa aircraft engine, a relatively large V8 used in the Voisin VIII bombers and escort fighters. The Peugeot 8Aa incorporated many of the design features found in Henry’s successful automobile racing engines. More than a thousand Peugeot 8Aa engines were built during the conflict however the type earned a reputation for poor reliability.

=== Peugeot legacy ===
The performance of Peugeot's racing car engines was not to remain without notice in the United States. Peugeot's engine design had a lasting influence U.S. engineers for many years. Cars from previous campaigns remained in the United States, and were sold to American drivers, among them Harry Arminius Miller who would soon copy this exceptional mechanical architecture to overcome its cleaner engines in four and eight cylinder versions, then after the bankruptcy of Miller, Fred Offenhauser who was one of Miller's employees in the 1930s. This type of engine in four-cylinder form was used until the end of the 1970s, with the final win at Indy by Offenhauser in 1976.

Looking back at Henry's time at Peugeot, a writer in 1921 said his cars "won practically all races in which they were entered".

== Post-WWI ==
Immediately after World War I in December 1918, the driver René Thomas and Ernest Henry offered to Ernest Maurice Ballot the design of a race car that Ernest Henry had made during the war. The latter accepted and thus aimed to participate in the 1919 Indianapolis 500, the first post-war Indianapolis race.

Ernest Henry had 101 days (it was in fact necessary to leave Paris no later than April 26, 1919 in order not to miss the boat) to finalize his study and create 4 complete cars for this event.

These four Ballot cars, which were designed in the utmost secrecy, naturally resembled pre-war Peugeots, but Ernest Henry, who took the time during the war to improve his design before the war, resumed his sketch hemi engine with four valves per cylinder, inclined at 60°, controlled by a dual overhead cam head, to equip a straight-eight engine capable of 2900 RPM and giving 150 hp for a top speed of nearly 200 kilometres per hour (120 mph).

The straight-eight engine architecture was quickly adopted in the world of motor sport (in 1921 more than half of Indianapolis contestants were straight-eights).

However, during the race, repeated tire and wheel problems did not allow the high expectations set in testing. Albert Guyot finished in fourth place behind two Peugeots with Henry motors and a Stutz.

The formula used for the 1920 Indianapolis 500 limited the displacement to 3 liters, so Ernest Henry conceived, according to the same technical architecture, a new straight-eight engine of 2.97 liters displacement. The maximum speed of the car was slightly reduced to 180 kilometres per hour (110 mph), but the usability further improved, and this time the Ballot entries finished second, fifth and seventh.

The brand Ballot was the only one to represent France at the 1921 French Grand Prix at Le Mans in July, with three eight-cylinder cars and a new four-cylinder 2-liter engine designed by Ernest Henry also participated in the race. De Palma finished second behind the Duesenberg driven by the American Murphy, and the two came third with Jules Goux at over 110 km/h average! The British STD Combine was represented by two Talbot and two Talbot Darracq- all four were in fact, Sunbeam Grand Prix the design of which was largely Henry's.

After this exploit Ballot, dubbed by Charles Faroux, the father of two liters, decided to build in series which was to be the LS type 2, with a 2-liter four-cylinder engine with a two-camshaft, 8-valve head, which he continued manufacturing until 1924, despite its high price due to its refined design and careful construction.

Also in 1921, the 8-cylinders distinguished themselves at the Italian Grand Prix played at Brescia and won by Jules Goux on a 3 L.

Ernest Henry left for Sunbeam-Talbot-Darracq in December 1921, following an offer of Louis Coatalen to design the Sunbeam 2-liter Grand Prix in 1922. He directed the racing team group, in Darracq Suresnes. He then moved to the automaker Omega, it appears he left in 1924.

== Later life ==
Henry's life following his career is less well known, mainly because of the very nature of his quiet character. He worked as a craftsman at home, and it seems that he did no more engine work after 1920. At the time of his death in 1950, at the age of sixty-five years, he worked in an engineering company Levallois near Paris.
