= Voisin VI =

French WW1 bomber aircraft

Voisin Type VI

General information
- Type: Bomber
- National origin: France
- Manufacturer: Société Anonyme des Aéroplanes G. Voisin
- Number built: approximately 50

History
- First flight: 1916
- Developed from: Voisin V

The Voisin VI or Voisin Type 6 was a French pusher biplane bomber aircraft of World War I.

== Development history ==
The first Voisin VI entered service in 1916 and replaced the Voisin III on the production lines. However, the Salmson engines of the Voisin 155 hp (116 kW) (as they were referred to at the Western Front) were held in low regard by their crews. Despite the more powerful engine, the Voisin VIs' payload was only marginally better and the maximum speed was only 113 km/h (70 mph; 61 kn) - not enough of an improvement to make a difference, while climb rate suffered substantially.

A single Voisin VI was fitted with a second Salmson in the nose of the fuselage, driving a tractor propeller. It is believed that the intention was to test a possible twin pusher and tractor propeller configuration for a new bomber planned by Voisin.

== Operational use ==
Approximately 50 Voisin VIs were built, and these served alongside the Voisin IIIs in front-line escadrilles, or aircraft squadrons, during 1916.

== Operators ==
France

- French Air Force

== Specifications ==
Data from

General characteristics

- Crew: 2
- Length: 9.62 m (31 ft 6.75 in)
- Wingspan: 14.75 m (52 ft 4.5 in)
- Height: 3.80 m (12 ft 6 in)
- Wing area: 48.66 m^{2} (523.8 sq ft)
- Empty weight: 1,000 kg (2,205 lb)
- Max takeoff weight: 1,470 kg (3,240 lb)
- Powerplant: 1 × Salmson (Canton-Unné) P9 9-cyl. water-cooled radial piston engine, 116 kW (155 hp)

Performance

- Maximum speed: 113 km/h (70 mph, 61 kn)
- Combat range: 249 km (155 mi, 134 nmi)
- Service ceiling: 3,500 m (11,500 ft)

Armament

- Guns: 1 × machine-gun
- Bombs: 60 kg (130 lb) of bombs
