= Hanriot HD.18 =

1920s French aircraft

HD.18
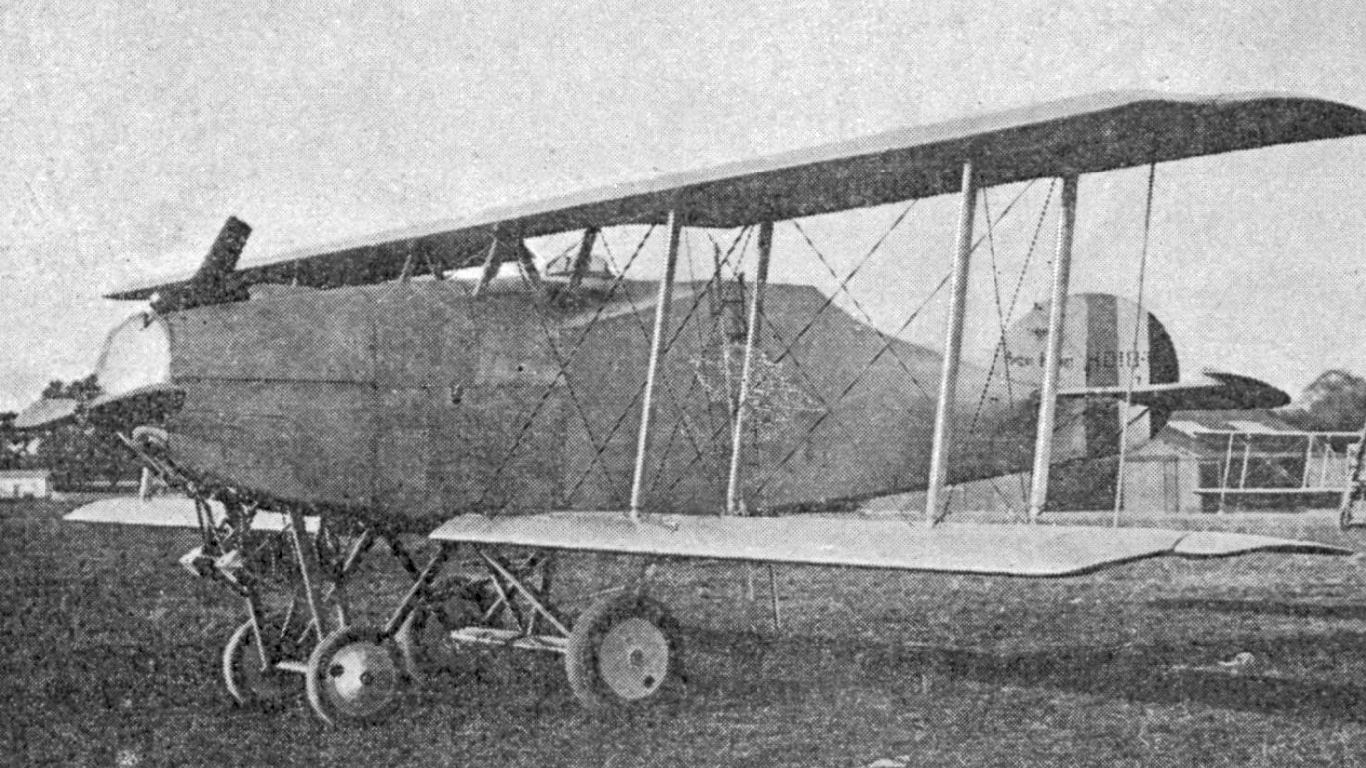

General information
- Type: Colonial police
- National origin: France
- Manufacturer: Hanriot
- Number built: 1

History
- First flight: 1921

The Hanriot HD.18 was a three-seat colonial police aircraft built by Hanriot in the early 1920s.

== Specifications (HD.18) ==
Data from

General characteristics

- Crew: 3
- Length: 9.50 m (31 ft 2 in)
- Wingspan: 13.10 m (43 ft 0 in)
- Wing area: 42 m^{2} (450 sq ft)
- Empty weight: 1,270 kg (2,800 lb)
- Gross weight: 2,470 kg (5,445 lb)
- Powerplant: 1 × Renault 12Fe V-12 water-cooled piston engine, 220 kW (300 hp)

Performance

- Maximum speed: 169 km/h (105 mph, 91 kn)
- Range: 500 km (310 mi, 270 nmi)
- Service ceiling: 5,500 m (18,000 ft)
