= Renault 12Fe =

French piston aircraft engine widely used during WW1 and the 1920s

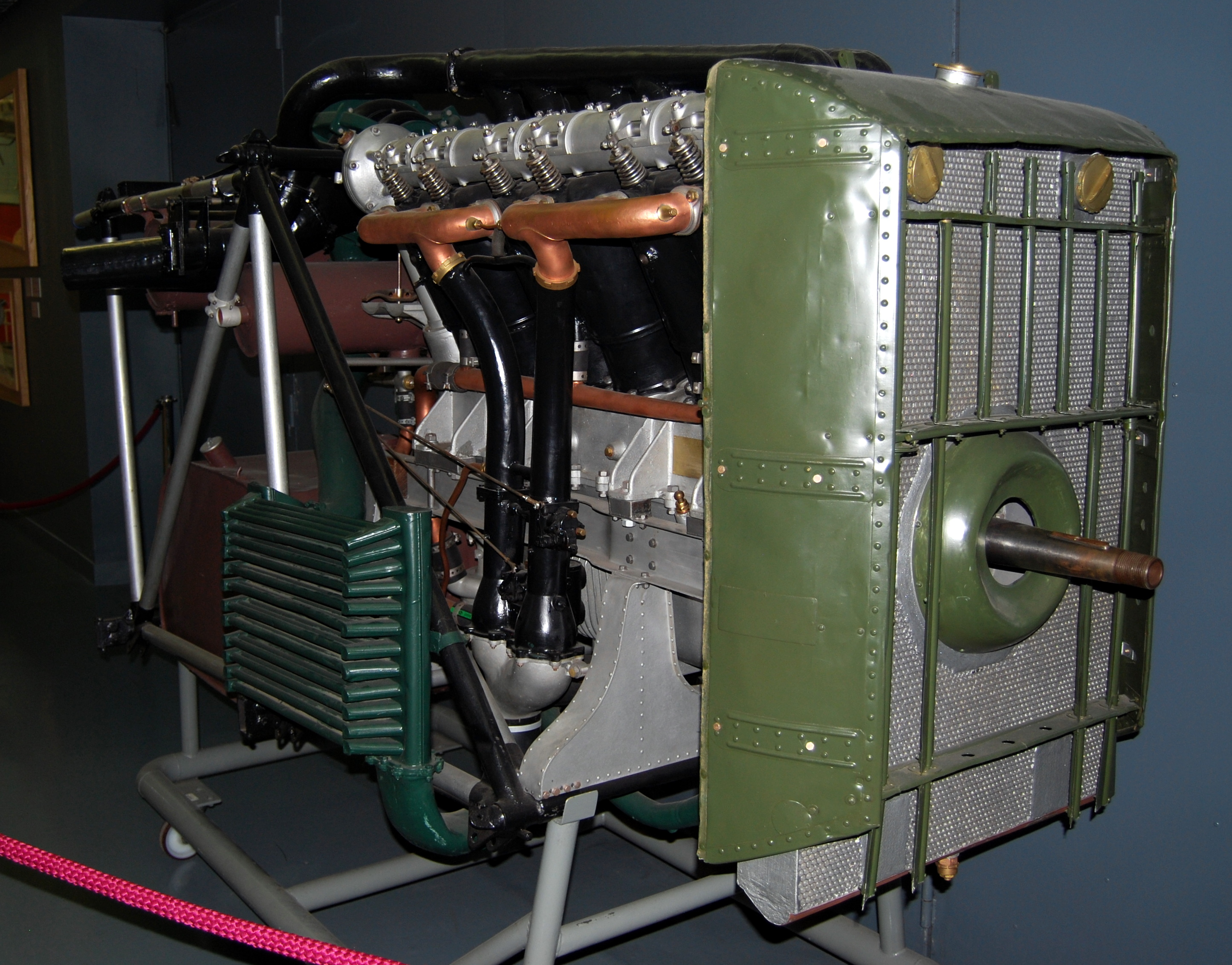
- Renault 12Fe aero-engine. Displayed at the national air and space museum of France.
- Type: Water-cooled V12 aero engine
- National origin: France
- Manufacturer: Renault
- First run: Late 1916
- Major applications: Breguet 14; Voisin X
- Number built: >7,000
- Developed from: Renault 12F

The Renault 12Fe, or 300 CV, is a water-cooled V12 aero engine. The 12Fe was the most produced Renault aircraft engine and powered many French aircraft during World War I and the 1920s.

The 12Fe engines were the result of incremental improvements to Renault's 12F series. Although the 12Fe retained the same cylinder arrangement and displacement as its predecessors, Renault designated it as a separate product, marketing it as the 300 CV. These engines were manufactured in Renault's factories in France and the United Kingdom, with additional licensed production by other French and British manufacturers.

By the end of World War I, 12Fe engines powered the bulk of the French bomber force. Post-war the engine type was selected by many of the first airlines and airmail services. During the 1920's 12Fe engines set new standards for endurance and reliability while aircraft fitted with an experimental turbocharged version of the engine claimed a series of high-altitude records.

== Design and development ==
In 1915, Renault started production of 22.08 L (1,347 cu in) water-cooled 50° V12 engines. These engines were progressively improved with the introduction of aluminium pistons allowing for increased power output and reduced weight. In 1917, the 12Fe model was homologated with a nominal rating of 300 hp (later increased to 320 hp). The 12Fe was the main production variant and accounted for the vast majority of engines built in the series.

The 12Fe’s crankshaft is carried on four plain bearings. Master-and-slave connecting rods allow corresponding cylinders in each row to be arranged directly opposite each other. The individually cast cylinders are arranged in pairs, with one welded liner for each pair. Cooling water is circulated using a single impeller centrifugal pump with dual outlets.

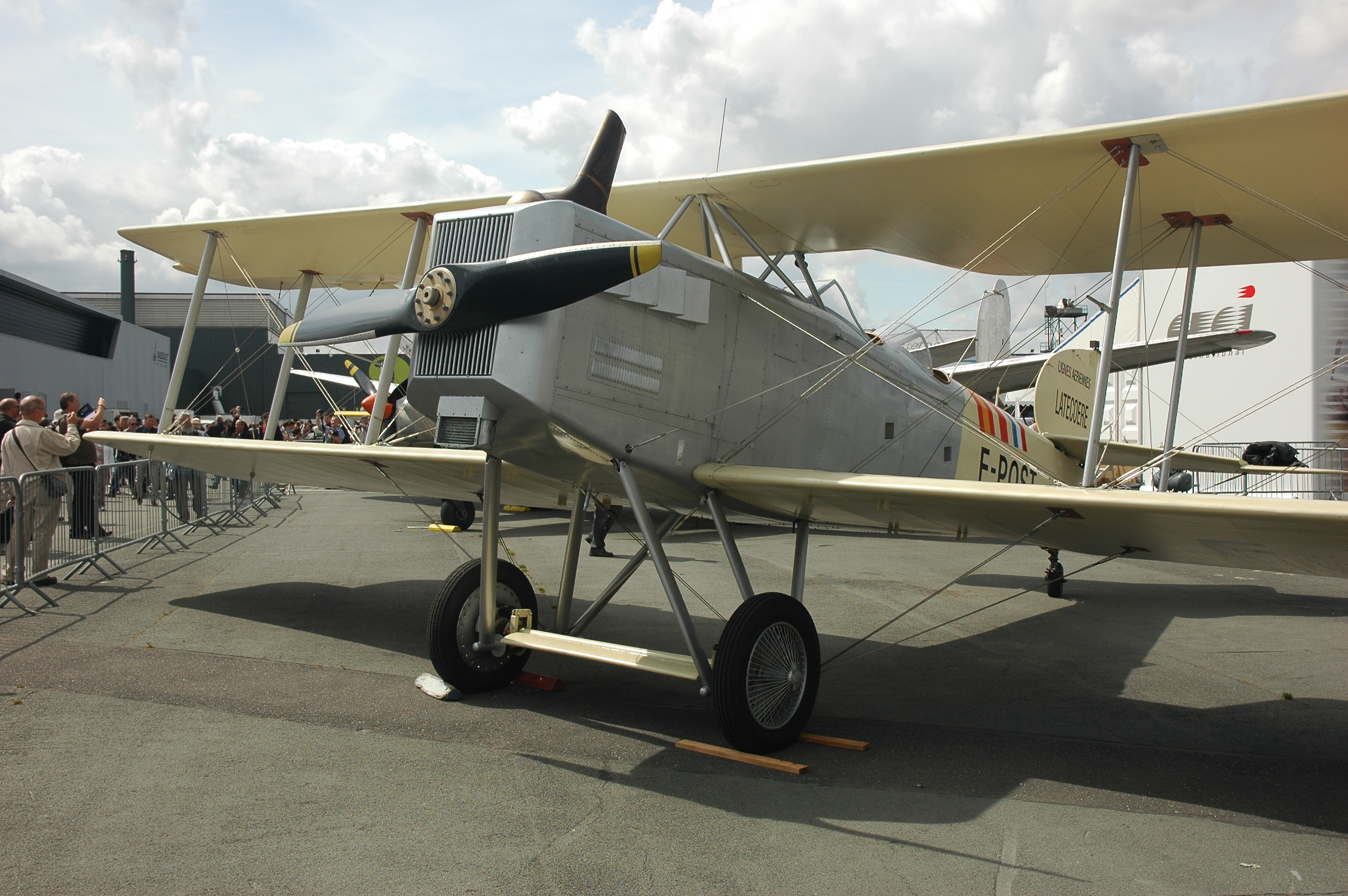
A Breguet 14 with the distinctive single vertical exhaust fitted to many aircraft powered by the Renault 12Fe

Ignition system has 100% redundancy with two spark plugs per cylinder and four magnetos (two per cylinder bank).

The engine makes use of valve overlap to improve cylinder scavenging. The inlet closed 6 degrees late while the exhaust closed 19 degrees late giving a 13-degree overlap.

== Production ==
The Renault 12Fe is by far the most numerous Renault aero-engine ever produced. 5,300 were built during WW1. Production continued at a slower pace after WW1 with the total number reaching about 7,000 by the mid 1920s. Although the engine was designated as part of the 12F series by the Service Technique de l'Aéronautique (STAe) it was known, and marketed, as an entirely new engine, the 300 CV (cheval-vapeur) (French: "horsepower”), by Renault.

In France, production of the engines took place at Renault’s Paris factories located in Boulogne-Billancourt and Vélizy-Villacoublay. In addition to Renault's own production, some engines were built under license by other French manufacturers including Bellanger and Darracq.

In the United Kingdom, Renault 12Fe engines were built under license by Renault's British subsidiary and Wolseley Motors.

== Operational history ==
The 12Fe was primarily used in bomber aircraft during World War One. By the end of the war, the 12Fe had become the standard powerplant for the Breguet 14 and had replaced the unreliable Peugeot 8Aa on the Voisin bombers. After the war the engine continued to be used by military aircraft and saw service in early airliners and mail planes.

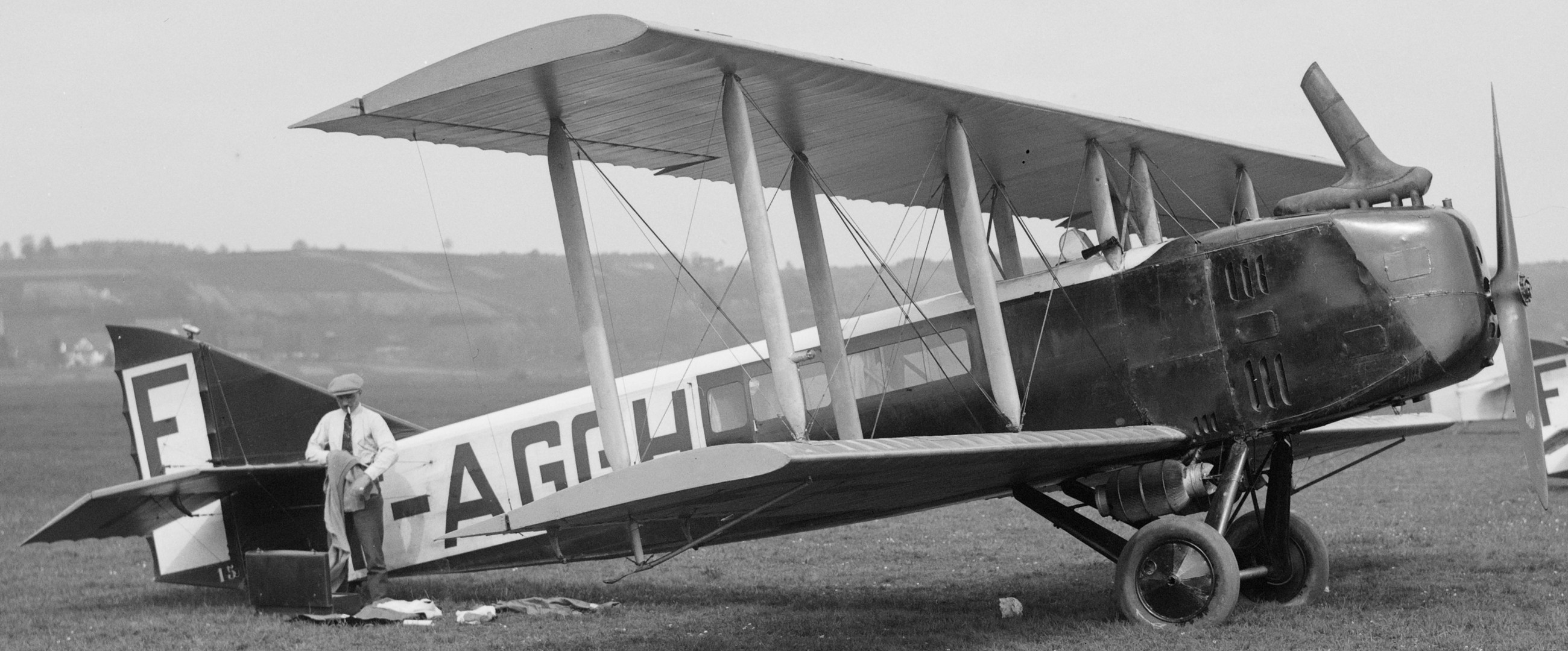
Renault 12Fe powered Farman F.70 airliner at Dübendorf airfield near Zurich (1925)

Aircraft powered by the Renault 12Fe set numerous records for distance, endurance and reliability in the early 1920s. The engine proved to be particularly durable. During the first half of 1923 Aéropostale aircraft powered by the 12Fe travelled a collective 663,700 km (412,400 mi) without experiencing any engine failures. In 1924, a 12Fe powered Aéropostale aircraft set a world safety record by traveling 150,000 km (93,000 mi) without experiencing any engine problems.

== Rateau turbochargers ==
From 1918, Renault 12Fe engines, fitted to Breguet 14 aircraft, were used to test experimental turbochargers designed by Auguste Rateau. Aircraft fitted with turbocharged 12Fe engines went on to set altitude records in 1919, 1922 and 1923. In 1924, the French Airforce received sixteen Breguet 14 aircraft fitted with Rateau turbochargers.

The early Rateau turbochargers delivered air to the engine’s carburetor at around two times atmospheric pressure while consuming less than 30 hp (22 kW). The following results were obtained in 1918 during tests on a Breguet 14 fitted with a turbocharged Renault 12Fe engine:

| Test | Naturally aspirated | Turbocharged | % Gain |
|---|---|---|---|
| Speed at 6,500 m (21,300 ft) | 101 km/h (63 mph) | 113 km/h (70 mph) | 12% |
| Speed at 4,200 m (13,800 ft) | 167 km/h (104 mph) | 194 km/h (121 mph) | 16% |
| Engine revs at 4,200 m (13,800 ft) | 1,380 rpm | 1,590 rpm | 15% |
| Climb rate from 3,500–4,000 m (11,500–13,100 ft) | 2 m/s (6.6 ft/s) | 2.3 m/s (7.5 ft/s) | 15% |

== Applications ==
- Breguet 14
- Breguet 16
- Caudron C.91
- Farman F.60 Goliath
- Farman F.70
- Georges Levy G.L.40
- Hanriot HD.18
- Latécoère 14
- Latécoère 17
- Lioré et Olivier LeO 8
- Lioré et Olivier LeO H-13
- Paul Schmitt P.S.10
- Potez XV
- Voisin X
- Airco DH.4
- Royal Aircraft Factory R.E.7
- Short Type 184

== Engines on display ==
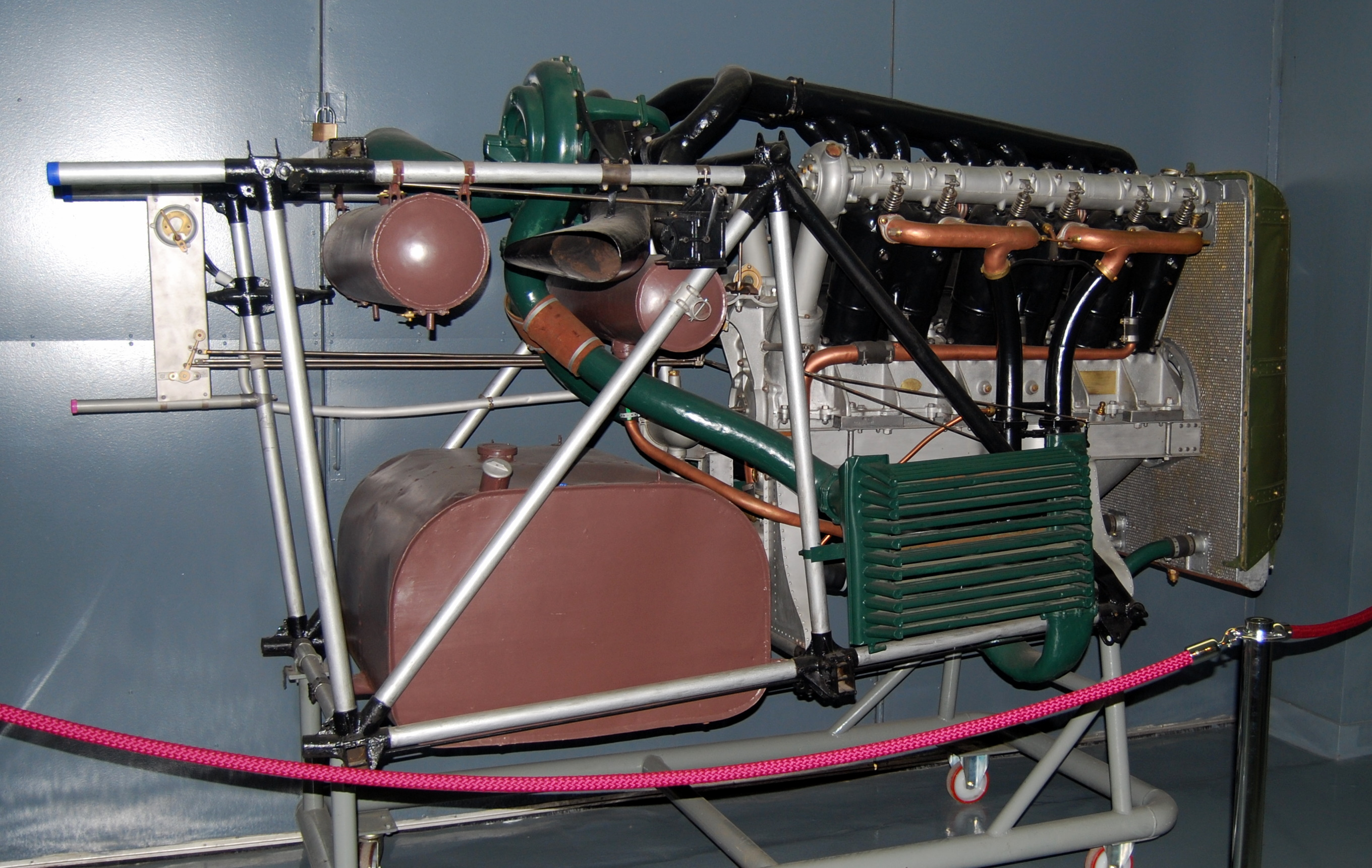
Renault 12Fe fitted with turbocharger

A preserved Renault 12Fe, fitted with an experimental Rateau turbocharger, is on display at the Musée de l'air et de l'espace. Another Renault 12Fe engine, installed in the nacelle of a Voisin X pusher aircraft, can be seen at the same museum.

One Renault 12Fe engine is on display at the Polish Aviation Museum in Kraków.

== Specifications ==
Data from Angle, L'Aéronautique and Renault. Data is for a naturally aspirated 12Fe engine.

=== General characteristics ===
- Type: Water–cooled, upright, 50-degree, V-12 piston engine
- Bore: 125 mm (4.92 in)
- Stroke: 150 mm (5.91 in)
- Displacement: 22.08 L (1,347 cu in)
- Length: 1.817 m (71.5 in)
- Width: 0.8 m (31 in)
- Height: 1.136 m (44.7 in)
- Dry weight: 360 kg (794 lb) (engine only). 437 kg (963 lb) with propeller, exhaust and radiator.

=== Components ===
- Valvetrain: SOHC (single overhead camshafts). Two valves per cylinder. When fitted, synchronization gear is attached to the end of the right hand camshaft.
- Fuel system: Two Zenith duplex carburetors. Heated by jacket water.
- Fuel type: Gasoline
- Oil system: Wet sump with 2 gear-pumps. 1 pump circulates oil. The other transfers oil from tank to sump. Lubricant: Castor oil.
- Cooling system: Water-cooled. One single impeller centrifugal pump. 60 kg (132 lb) of cooling water.
- Reduction gear: None. Direct drive.
- Rotation: Counterclockwise when looking end on at the propeller hub

=== Performance ===
- Power output: 327 hp (244 kW) @ 1600 rpm
- Compression ratio: 5:1
- Fuel consumption: 111 L/h (24 imp gal/h)
- Specific fuel consumption: 0.349 kg/kWh (0.573 lb/(hp⋅h))
- Oil consumption: 8 L/h (14 imp pt/h)
- Power-to-weight ratio: 0.623 kW/kg (0.379 hp/lb)

== See also ==
Comparable engines

- Galloway Atlantic
- Liberty L-12
- Peugeot 8Aa
- Rolls-Royce Eagle
- Sunbeam Matabele

Related lists

- List of aircraft engines
