= Peugeot 8Aa =

French WW1 aircraft engine

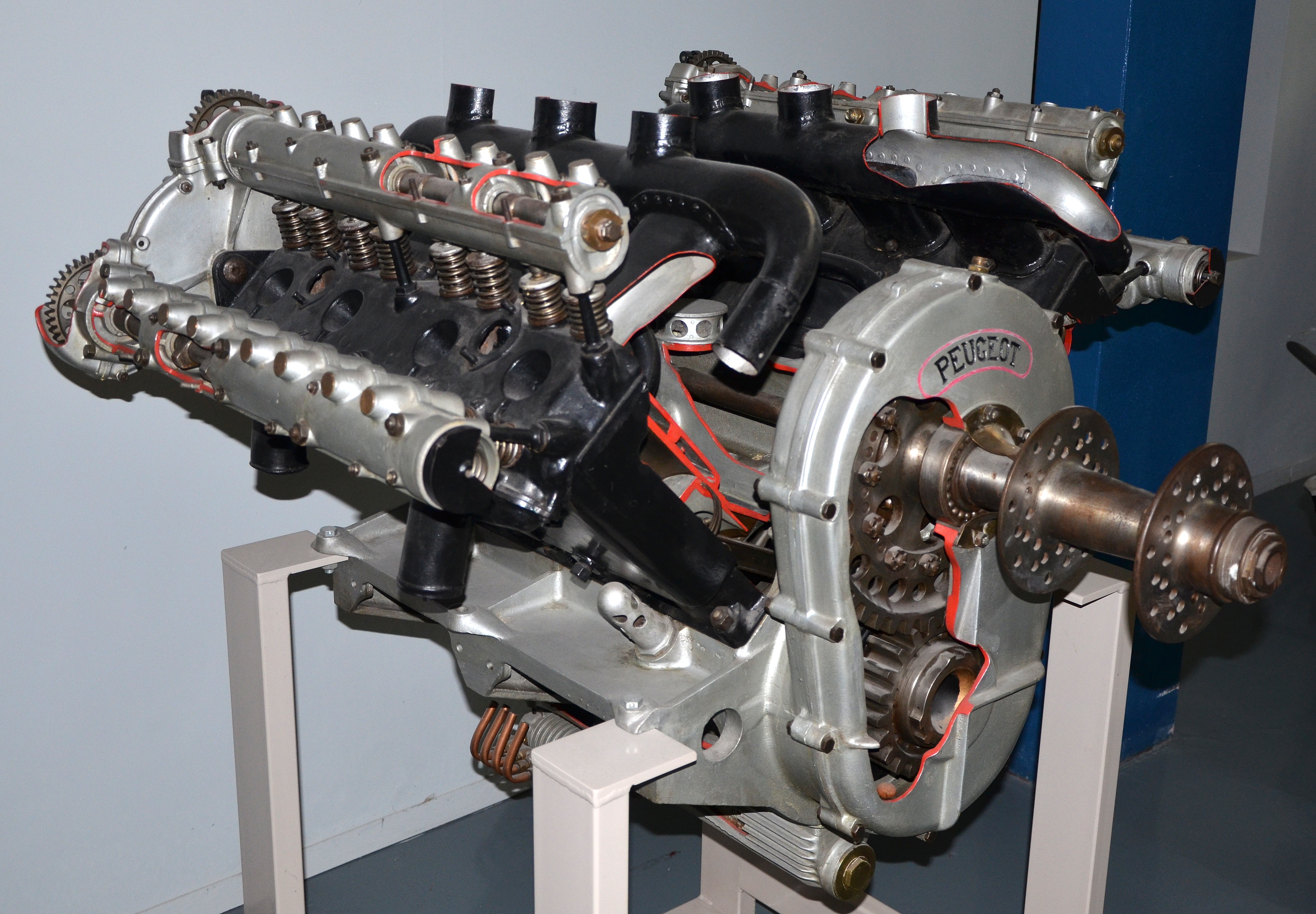
- A partially cutaway Peugeot 8Aa engine on display at the Air and Space Museum in Paris
- Type: Water-cooled V8 aero engine
- National origin: France
- Manufacturer: Peugeot
- First run: 1916
- Major applications: Voisin VIII
- Number built: 1,054 (1916-1917)

The Peugeot 8Aa, or L112, is a water-cooled V8 aircraft engine that equipped the Voisin VIII bombers and escort fighters built during World War I.

The engine was designed to meet a 1915 request from the French armament ministry for aero engines capable of long endurance at high altitudes. Peugeot responded to the ministry’s request with a design based on their successful racing car engines. Orders were placed for 250 engines in late 1915 even though the first engine did not complete its 50-hour acceptance test until February 1916.

For an engine of its time period, the Peugeot 8Aa engine has many innovative features, including double overhead camshafts, four valves per cylinder and a dry sump. The engine was noted for having exceptional fuel efficiency, but suffered from poor mechanical reliability. Frequent engine failures lead to the decision, taken in May 1917, to withdraw the Peugeot powered Voisin VIIIs from front line service.

== Design and development ==
The Peugeot 8Aa was developed to meet a 1915 French military requirement for 200 hp (150 kW) (Note: To put this size into context, the Voisin L, which was in service as a bomber during 1914, was powered by an engine of only 80 hp.) aircraft engines to equip a new class of bomber aircraft designed to hit targets inside Germany. To achieve this the engines needed to run for six hours with most of the journey taking place at altitudes around 4,400 m (14,400 ft). The requirement pushed the limits of contemporary engine technology and to meet it French government approached Panhard, Peugeot and Renault Peugeot's submission was a development of their four-cylinder racing car engines which had powered the winners of the Indianapolis 500 in 1913 and 1914.

For a WW1 era aero engine, the Peugeot 8Aa has many advanced features including double overhead camshafts, four valves per cylinder and a dry sump all of which are design elements inherited from Peugeot’s pre-WW1 racing cars. Compared to single overhead camshaft engines, the use of double overhead camshafts allows for a wider angle between intake and exhaust valves, which improves the air-fuel mixture's flow through the engine.

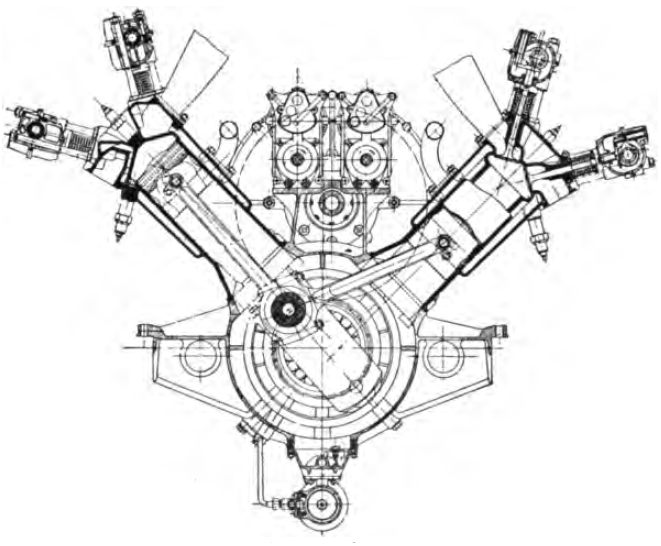
Peugeot 8Aa transverse section

The engine's eight cylinders are in a 90 degree Vee arrangement and are made of cast iron formed in blocks of four with integral water jackets. In each cylinder head there are four inclined valves guided in bronze bushings. The engine's four camshafts (two per cylinder bank) are enclosed in aluminium housings and operate the valves through tappets. The camshafts are hollow allowing lubricating oil to be fed directly to the camshaft bearings. Pistons are machined from forged steel, and each is fitted with two piston rings. The engine is equipped with fork-and-blade connecting rods.

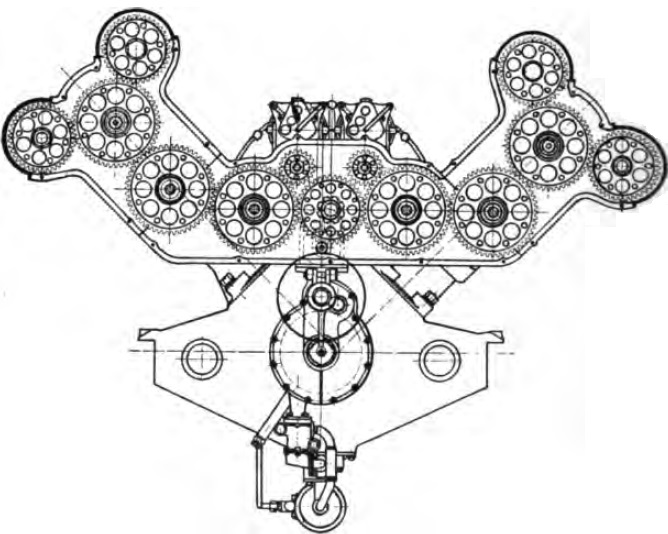
The Peugeot 8Aa's gear train

A reduction gear rotates the propeller at half the speed of the crankshaft. The propeller shaft is mounted on ball bearings and extends far out in front of the crankcase. When fitted in a Voisin VIII, the propeller shaft is attached to a two bladed 4 m (13 ft) diameter wooden propeller. A shaft, extending directly back through the Vee of the engine, drives the camshaft spur gear train along with the water pumps, magnetos, tachometer and other accessories.

Each cylinder has two spark plugs. The twin spark plug design improved safety by adding redundancy and allowed for more complete combustion of the air-fuel mixture resulting in improved engine performance. One spark plug is situated in the center of the cylinder head and the other in an inverted position just below the inlet valve on the outside of the cylinder. Spark plugs are powered by two magnetos.

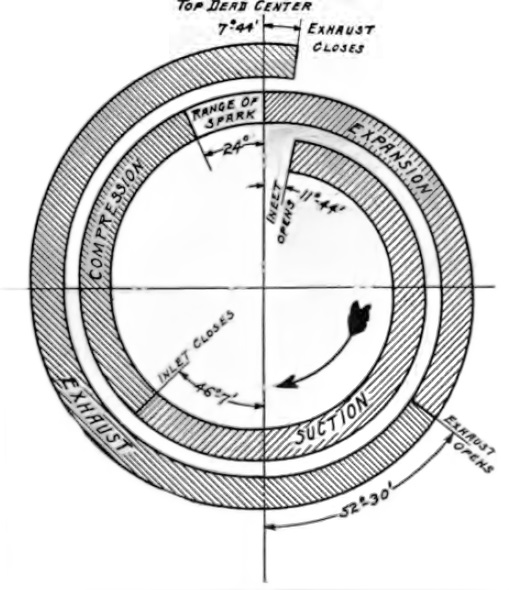
Peugeot 8Aa valve timing diagram

The Peugeot 8Aa's valve timing was considered conventional for an engine of its time period with no valve overlap. Both the exhaust valve closure and the inlet valve opening occur after top dead center.

Two carburetors (one for each cylinder bank) are attached to the inlet manifolds which are jacketed and heated by exhaust gasses. The use of exhaust gasses allowed for higher temperatures than could have been attained by water jacketing. The high inlet manifold temperatures resulted in increased engine efficiency.

The Peugeot 8Aa was a remarkably fuel-efficient engine for its time. At its most efficient point, the engine's specific fuel consumption was 0.252 kg/kWh (0.414 lb/(hp⋅h)) corresponding to a thermal efficiency of more than 30%.

== Production ==
Serial production of the Peugeot 8Aa started before the completion of official engine tests. 250 engines were ordered before the end of 1915. The first engines completed their 50-hour tests in February 1916.

Production of the engines took place at Peugeot’s Paris workshops located in Issy-les-Moulineaux, Levallois-Perret and La Garenne-Colombes. In addition to Peugeot's own production, some engines were built under license by other French manufacturers including Darracq. By the end of 1917 a total of 1,054 engines had been built.

During World War I, Peugeot also manufactured Hispano-Suiza aero-engines under license. Peugeot were the single largest manufacturer of the 200 hp (150 kW) Hispano-Suiza 8 with 5,506 engines built. The Peugeot 8Aa shared many common parts with the Hispano-Suiza 8, and its British derivative the Wolseley Viper. Camshafts, piston rings and some bearings were interchangeable.

== Operational history ==
The Peugeot engine was assigned as the power-plant for the Voisin VIII which was larger, and carried a greater bomb-load, than the earlier Voisin pushers powered by Salmson water-cooled aero-engines. A total of 1,123 Voisin VIIIs were built during World War I.

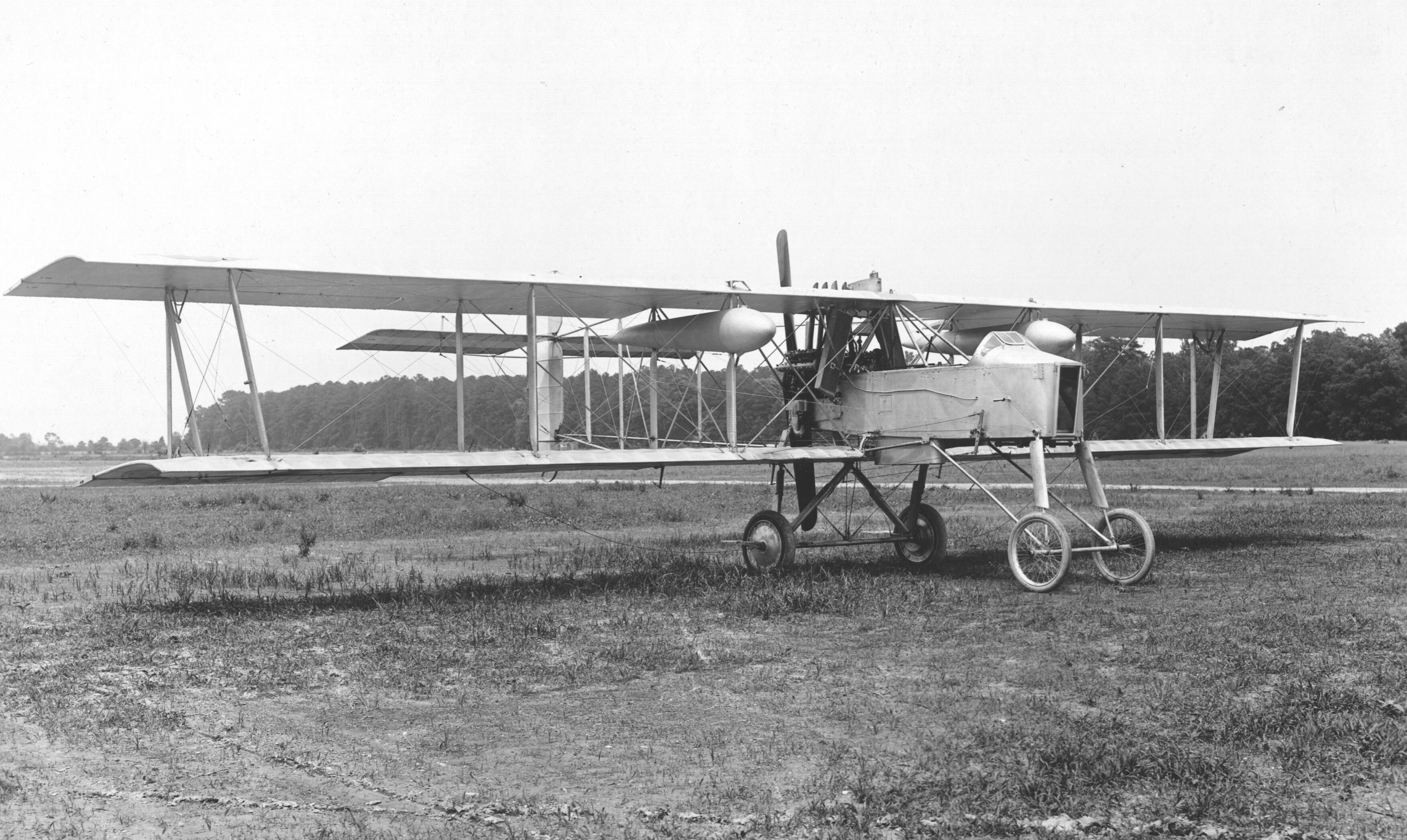
Voisin VIII bomber. The poor reliability of the Peugeot 8Aa engine resulted in this aircraft having a short service life

The Voisin VIII was primarily used as a night bomber, with some aircraft being equipped as escort fighters. The aircraft entered service with French bomber squadrons in November 1916, and by the start of 1917, they made up the bulk of the French night bombing force.

The Peugeot 8Aa engine suffered from frequent mechanical breakdowns and, as a direct result, by May 1917 the decision was taken to phase out the Voisin VIII. Its replacement was the Voisin X, a near identical aircraft powered by the Renault 12Fe. By February of 1918, only 51 Peugeot-powered Voisin aircraft remained in front line service. Small numbers of Peugeot powered Voisin VIII aircraft continued to be built during 1918 with the type serving as a trainer till the end of the World War I.

== Reliability problems ==
The Peugeot 8Aa engine was criticized by the Voisin VIII's crews for its poor reliability. Problems reported included poor lubrication, carburetor failures and faults with the ignition system. Gabriel Voisin attempted to address these concerns by sourcing Hispano-Suiza 8 engines however this proved impossible as these were already allocated to existing fighter aircraft types.

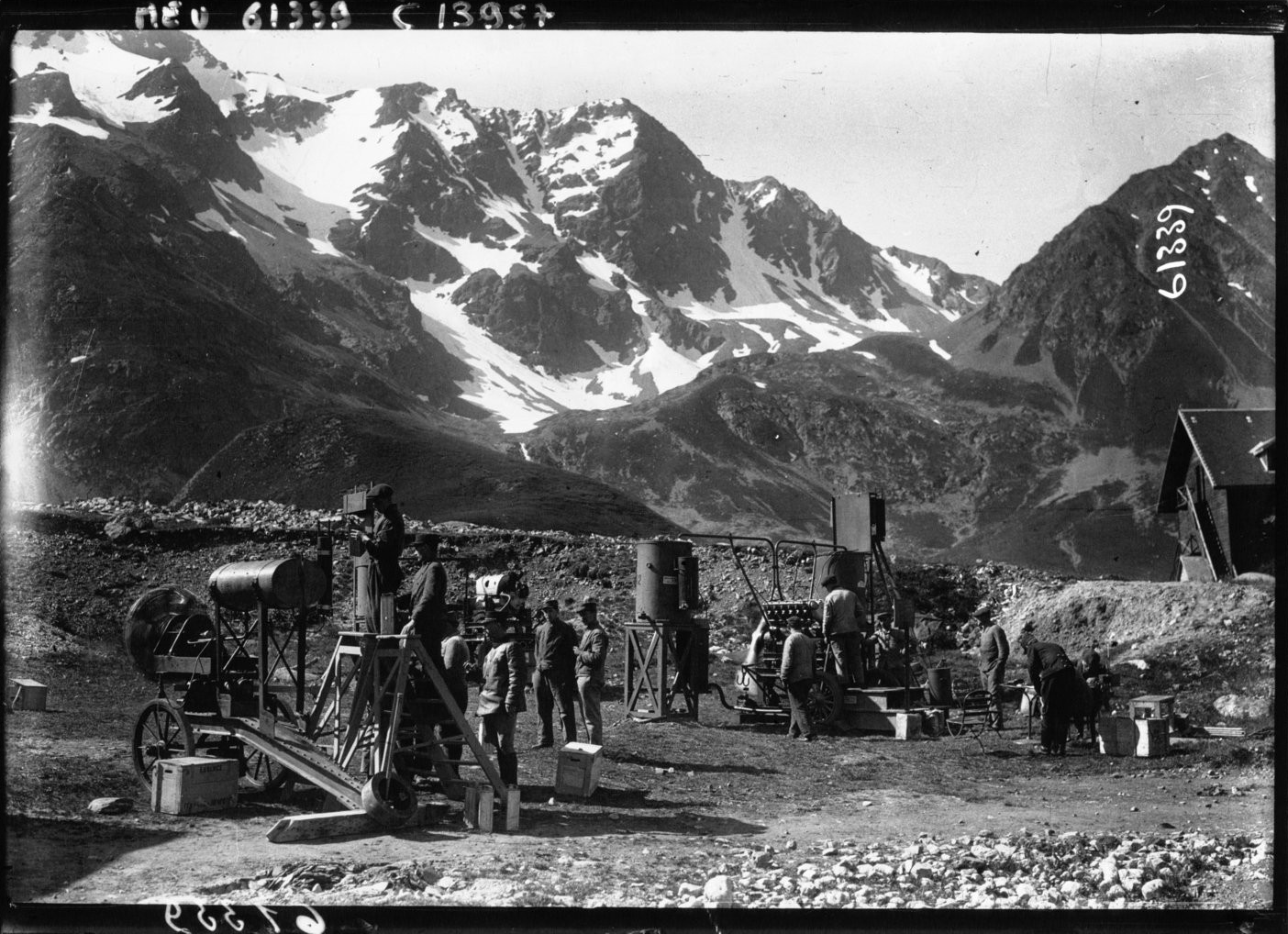
Peugeot 8Aa tested during 1916 at an altitiude of 2,500 m (8,100 ft) in Col du Lautaret, French Alps

The Peugeot 8Aa's carburetors were warmed by exhaust heat however this arrangement was ineffective in the cold temperatures found at high altitudes which lead to carburetor icing. It is notable that the Peugeot 8Aa's replacement in the Voisin bombers was the Renault 12Fe which heated its carburetors via the circulation of jacket water.

== Applications ==
- Voisin VIII
  - Voisin LAP - factory designation for VIII night-bomber
  - Voisin LBP - factory designation for VIII escort fighter armed with a 37 mm (1.457 in) cannon

== Engines on display ==
A partially cutaway Peugeot 8Aa is on display at the Air and Space Museum in Paris.

A Peugeot 8Aa engine is on display at the Polish Aviation Museum in Kraków.

== Specifications ==
Data from Angle

=== General characteristics ===
- Type: Water–cooled, upright, 90-degree, V-8 piston engine
- Bore: 100 mm (3.94 in)
- Stroke: 180 mm (7.09 in)
- Displacement: 11.33 L (691.52 cu in)
- Dry weight: 400 kg (882 lb)
- Designer: Ernest Henry

=== Components ===
- Valvetrain: DOHC (double overhead camshafts). 4 valves per cylinder.
- Fuel system: Two Claudel-Hobson carburetors
- Fuel type: Gasoline
- Oil system: Dry sump
- Cooling system: Water-cooled. 2 centrifugal pumps.
- Reduction gear: 0.5:1

=== Performance ===
- Power output: 230 hp (172 kW) @ 2000 rpm
- Fuel consumption: 62.5 L/h (14 imp gal/h)
- Specific fuel consumption: 0.252 kg/kWh (0.414 lb/(hp⋅h))
- Oil consumption: 3.2 L/h (6 imp pt/h)
- Power-to-weight ratio: 0.623 kW/kg (0.379 hp/lb)

== See also ==
Comparable engines

- Hispano-Suiza 8
- Renault 12Fe
- Sunbeam Arab
- Wolseley Viper

Related lists

- List of aircraft engines
