= Voisin VII =

WWI French reconnaissance aircraft

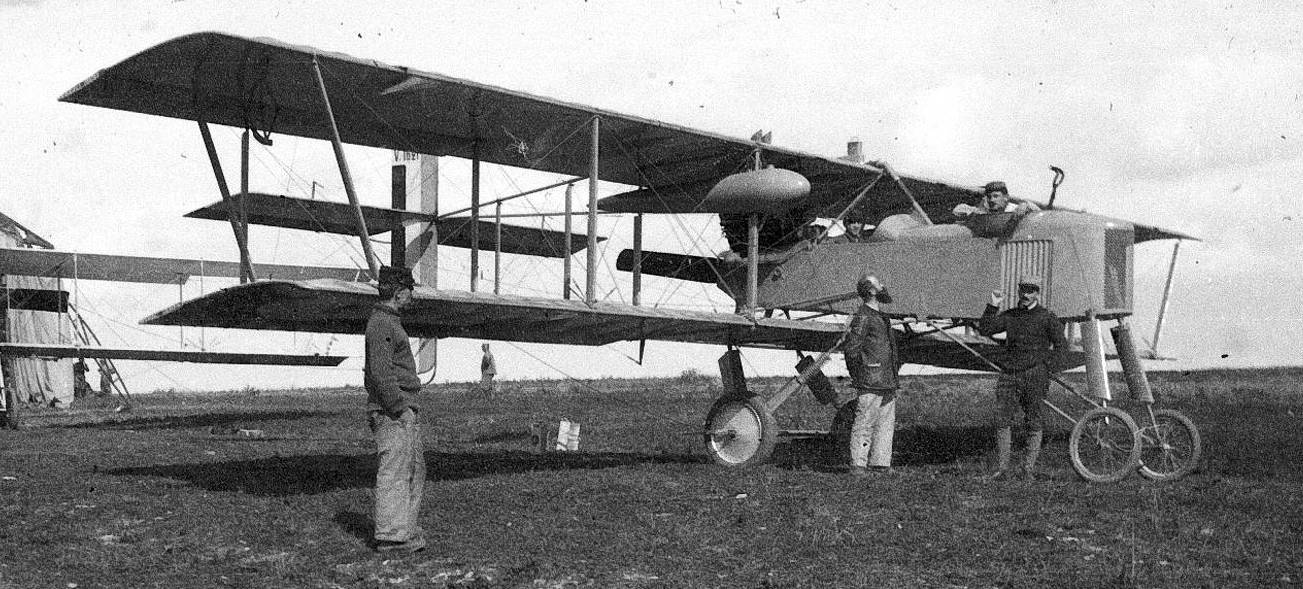

General information
- Type: Reconnaissance
- Manufacturer: Voisin
- Designer: Gabriel Voisin
- Primary user: Aéronautique Militaire
- Number built: 100

History
- Introduction date: 1916
- First flight: 1916
- Developed from: Voisin V
- Developed into: Voisin VIII

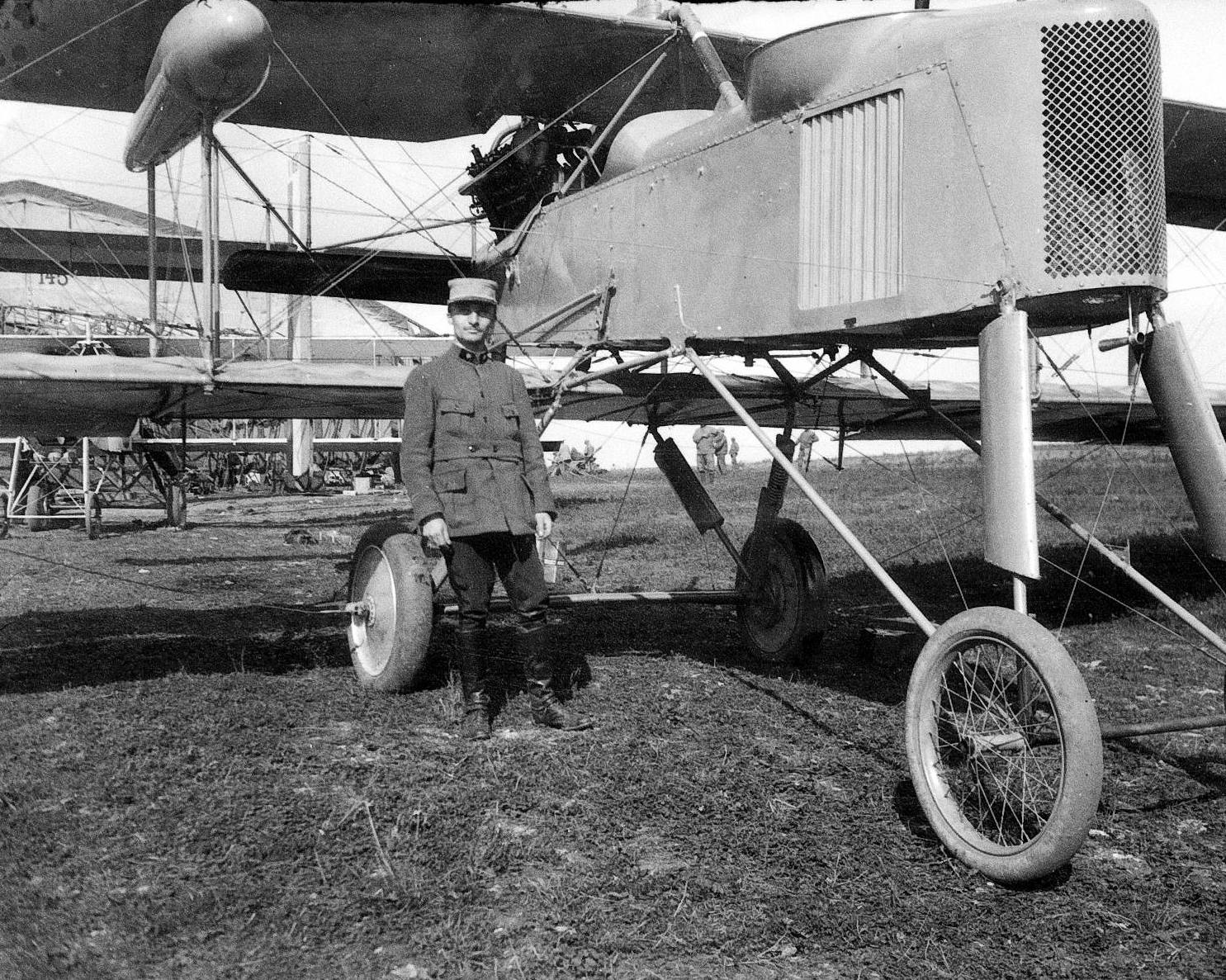
Voisin VII of escadrille V.114

The Voisin VII was a French reconnaissance pusher biplane aircraft of World War I.

== Design ==
The Voisin VII was a biplane with a single engine in a pusher configuration, developed by Voisin in 1916 as an enlarged Voisin V with the engine cooling radiators moved to the nose. However, the Voisin VII was underpowered, even with improvements over its predecessor.

== Operators ==
France

- Aéronautique Militaire

== Specifications ==
Data from

General characteristics

- Crew: 2
- Length: 10.35 m (33 ft 11 in)
- Wingspan: 17.93 m (58 ft 10 in)
- Height: 3.95 m (13 ft 0 in)
- Wing area: 61.14 m^{2} (658.1 sq ft)
- Empty weight: 1,250 kg (2,756 lb)
- Gross weight: 1,700 kg (3,748 lb)
- Powerplant: 1 × Renault 8G V-8 water-cooled piston engine, 130 kW (180 hp)
- Propellers: 2-bladed Voisin 4, 2.98 m (9 ft 9 in) diameter wood fixed pitch pusher propeller

Performance

- Maximum speed: 112 km/h (70 mph, 60 kn) at sea level
- Endurance: 4½ hours

Armament

- Guns: 1 x 7.7 mm (0.303 in) machine gun
