= Hotchkiss Ordnance Company =

- Industry: Manufacturing
- Founded: Paris, France (1875)
- Founder: Benjamin B. Hotchkiss
- Headquarters: Paris, France
- Products: Armaments; Munitions

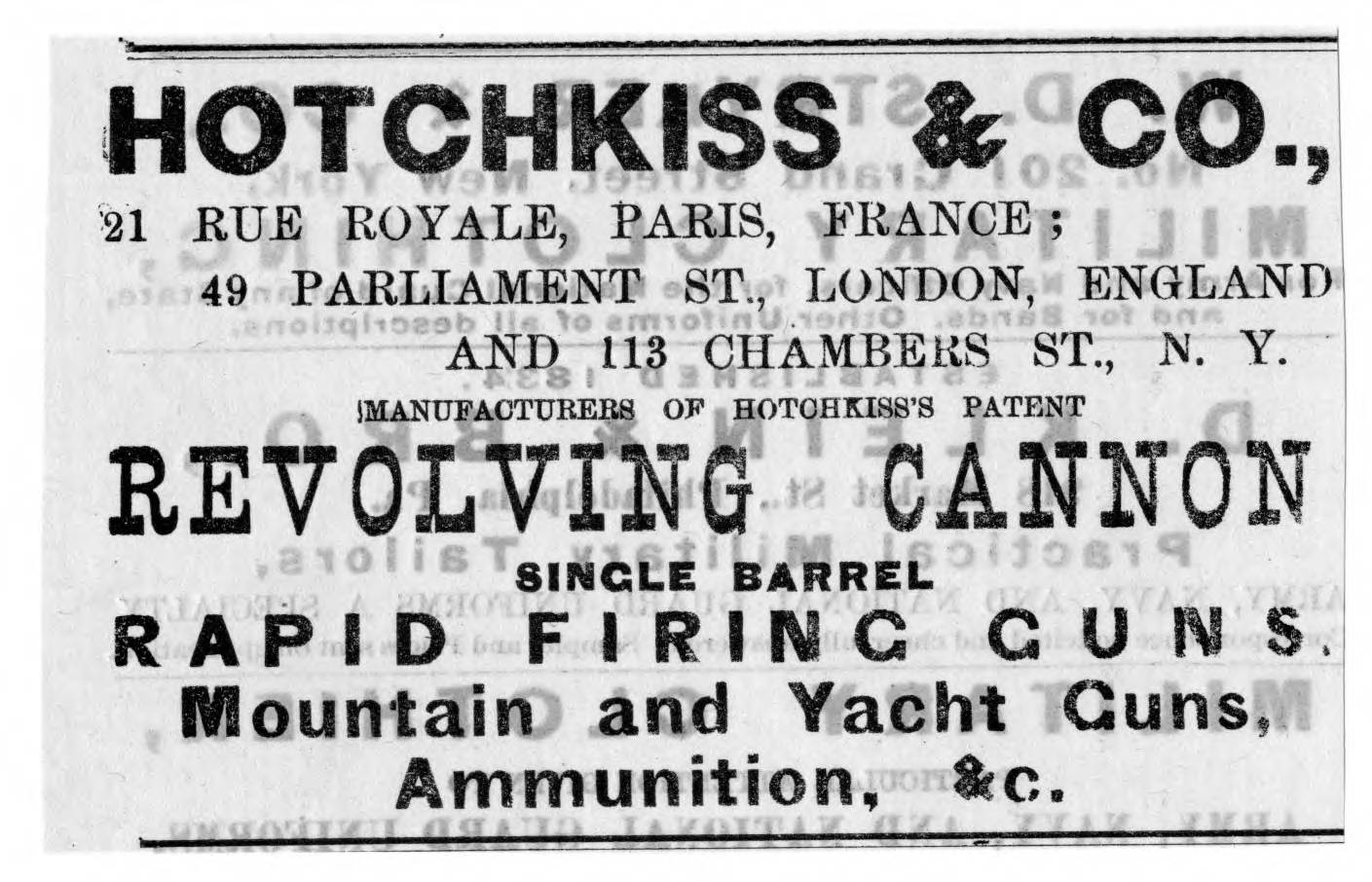
An advertisement by Hotchkiss & Co. for revolving cannon, published in November 1885

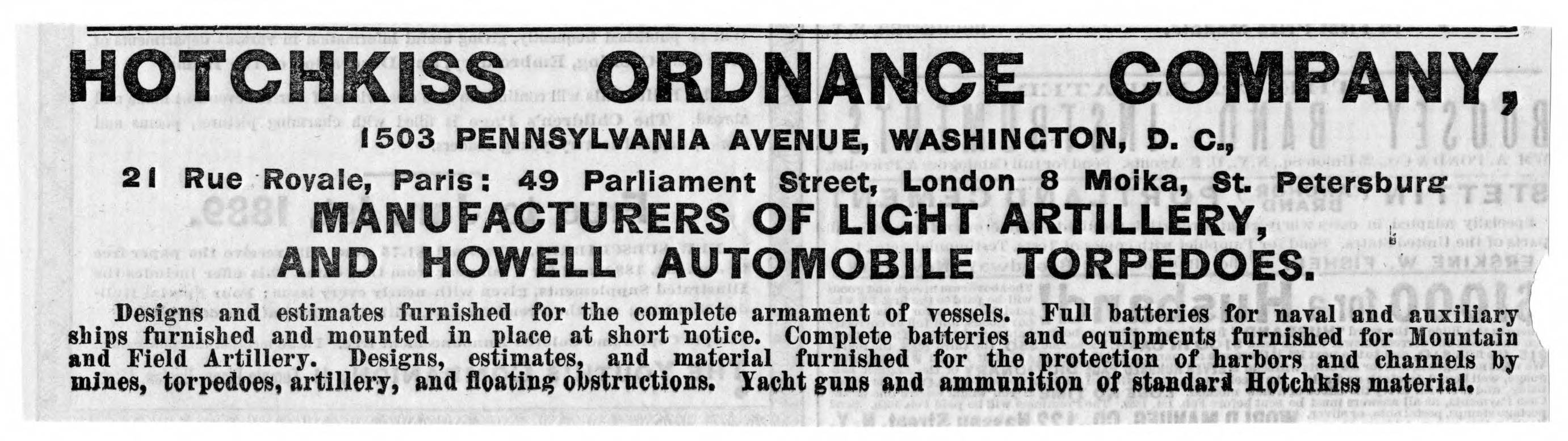
A Hotchkiss Ordnance Company advertisement for Howell torpedoes, published November 1888

The Hotchkiss Ordnance Company was an English armaments manufacturer founded by American ordnance engineer Benjamin B. Hotchkiss.

== History ==
In the 1850s, Hotchkiss was employed as a gunsmith in Hartford, working on Colt revolvers and Winchester rifles. He went to France in 1867 and organized Hotchkiss & Co. in 1875, setting up offices in Paris and manufacturing facilities in Saint-Denis. This company enjoyed success and the confidence of French authorities, receiving large governmental orders and was allowed to export arms to other countries. In 1884, Hotchkiss and William Armstrong & Co. of England agreed to manufacture Hotchkiss guns at the Elswick works.

Hotchkiss died in 1885, and in 1887 the affairs of both companies were placed under the French corporation and renamed respectively, the Société Anonyme des Anciens Etablissements Hotchkiss et Cie of France and the Hotchkiss Ordnance Company, Ltd. in England.
