= Voisin Type de Course =

1910s French aircraft

Type de Course

General information
- Type: Sports aircraft
- National origin: France
- Manufacturer: Voisin
- Designer: Gabriel Voisin

History
- First flight: April 1910

The Voisin Type de Course was an early French aircraft built by Voisin Frères. It was first flown early in 1910.

== Design and development ==
The 1910 Type de Course was designed by Gabriel Voisin as a racing aircraft to take part in the many competitions being held at the time. A development of his highly successful 1907 biplane, it was a two-seater two-bay pusher configuration biplane with an elevator mounted on the upcurved front of the nacelle and rear-mounted empennage carried on two pairs of booms carrying the tail surfaces. The first aircraft flown, built for Henri Rougier, had a single rudder above the stabiliser and a fixed fin below: some later examples differed slightly. The structure made extensive use of metal: the nacelle was constructed of circular and elliptical section nickel-steel tubing, the interplane struts were steel and the wings had steel spars and wooden ribs. Importantly, it differed from the earlier Voisin aircraft in having provision for lateral control in the form of ailerons, which allowed Voisin to dispense with the "side-curtains" between the wings characteristic of his earlier aircraft. Rougier's aircraft had biplane mid-gap ailerons mounted on the front outer pair of interplane struts. The undercarriage consisted of a pair of mainwheels under the wings, a large nosewheel carried between a pair of inverted V-struts under the front of the nacelle and a small tailwheel mounted on the bottom of the fin. It was powered by a 50 hp E.N.V. water-cooled V8.

The first example was flown by Rougier on the 13 April 1910. A second aircraft built for René Métrot differed in having monoplane ailerons, two rudders and an uncovered nacelle. Others were built for various customers, differing in the engine fitted: these included the 37 kW (50 hp) Gnome and the 4-cylinder Gobron. Six were flown at the second Reims Grande Semaine d'Aviation, but without any success in any of the competitions.

== Specifications ==
Data from Flight

General characteristics

- Crew: 1
- Capacity: 1 passenger
- Length: 9 m (29 ft 6 in)
- Wingspan: 9 m (29 ft 6 in)
- Wing area: 33 m^{2} (360 sq ft)
- Gross weight: 350 kg (772 lb)
- Powerplant: 1 × E.N.V. Type A V-8 water cooled piston engine. , 37 kW (50 hp)
- Propellers: 2-bladed Voisin, 2.50 m (8 ft 2 in) diameter
