= List of aircraft (V) =

This is a list of aircraft in alphabetical order beginning with 'V'.

== V ==
=== V-STOL ===
(V-STOL Aircraft Fort Myers, Florida, United States)

- V-STOL Pairadigm
- V-STOL Solution
- V-STOL Super Solution 2000
- V-STOL XC 2000T

=== V-TOL Aerospace ===
- V-TOL Aerospace Hammerhead
- V-TOL Aerospace i-copter Phantom
- V-TOL Aerospace i-copter Seeker

=== Vagel-Grip ===
(Vagel-Grip Flugzeugbau, Johannistal)

- Vagel-Grip SP-5 Greif Sarotti

=== Vajic ===
(Borislav Vajic)

- Vajic V-55

=== Vakhmistrov ===
(Vladimir Vakhmistrov, Soviet Union)

- Vakhmistrov I-Ze
- Vakhmistrov Zveno-1
- Vakhmistrov Zveno-1a
- Vakhmistrov Zveno-2
- Vakhmistrov Zveno-3
- Vakhmistrov Zveno-5
- Vakhmistrov Zveno-6
- Vakhmistrov Zveno-7
- Vakhmistrov Aviamatka (Airborne mothership)

=== Valentin ===
(Valentin Flugzeugbau GmbH, Hasfurt, Germany)

- Valentin Taifun

=== Valladeau ===
- Valladeau light aircraft

=== Valley Engineering ===
(Valley Engr (Gene & Larry Smith), Rolla, Missouri, United States)

- Valley Engineering Back Yard Flyer UL

=== Valmet ===
(Valmet OY Lentokonetehdas - Valmet Aircraft Factory, Finland)

- Valmet L-70 Vinka
- Valmet L-80 Turbo-Vinha
- Valmet L-90 Redigo
- Valmet L-90TP Redigo
- Valmet PIK-23 Towmaster
- Valmet Tuuli I
- Valmet Tuuli II
- Valmet Tuuli III
- Valmet Tuuli IV
- Valmet Vihuri I
- Valmet Vihuri II
- Valmet Vihuri III

=== Valunas ===
(Y.Valunas, Prenai, Lithuania)

- Valunas Va-1 (a.k.a. Valuno Va-1)

=== VAMP ===
(VAMP (Van Dersarl Motor Products) Aircraft Co, Denver, Colorado, United States)

- VAMP CV

=== Van Anden ===
(Frank Van Anden, Islip, New York, United States)

- Van Anden 1911 Biplane

=== Van Berkel ===
(Van Berkel's Patent Company Ltd)

- Van Berkel W-A
- Van Berkel W-B
- Van Berkel W-F

=== Van Camp-Murray ===
(Vernon Van Camp and Durard Murray, Kingman, Kansas, United States)

- Van Camp-Murray Sport

=== Van Cleave ===
(William Van Cleave, Love Field, Dallas, Texas, United States)

- Van Cleave 1928 Biplane

=== Van Dine ===
(Peter D Van Dine, Merganser Aircraft Corp, Annapolis, Maryland, United States)

- Van Dine Merganser 1
- Van Dine Merganser 2
- Van Dine Merganser 3

=== Van Duzer ===
(Frank Van Duzer, Waukegan, Illinois, United States)

- Van Duzer 1936 Monoplane

=== Van Lith ===
(Jean Van Lith)

- Van Lith IV
- Van Lith VI

=== van Meel ===
(Marinus van Meel)

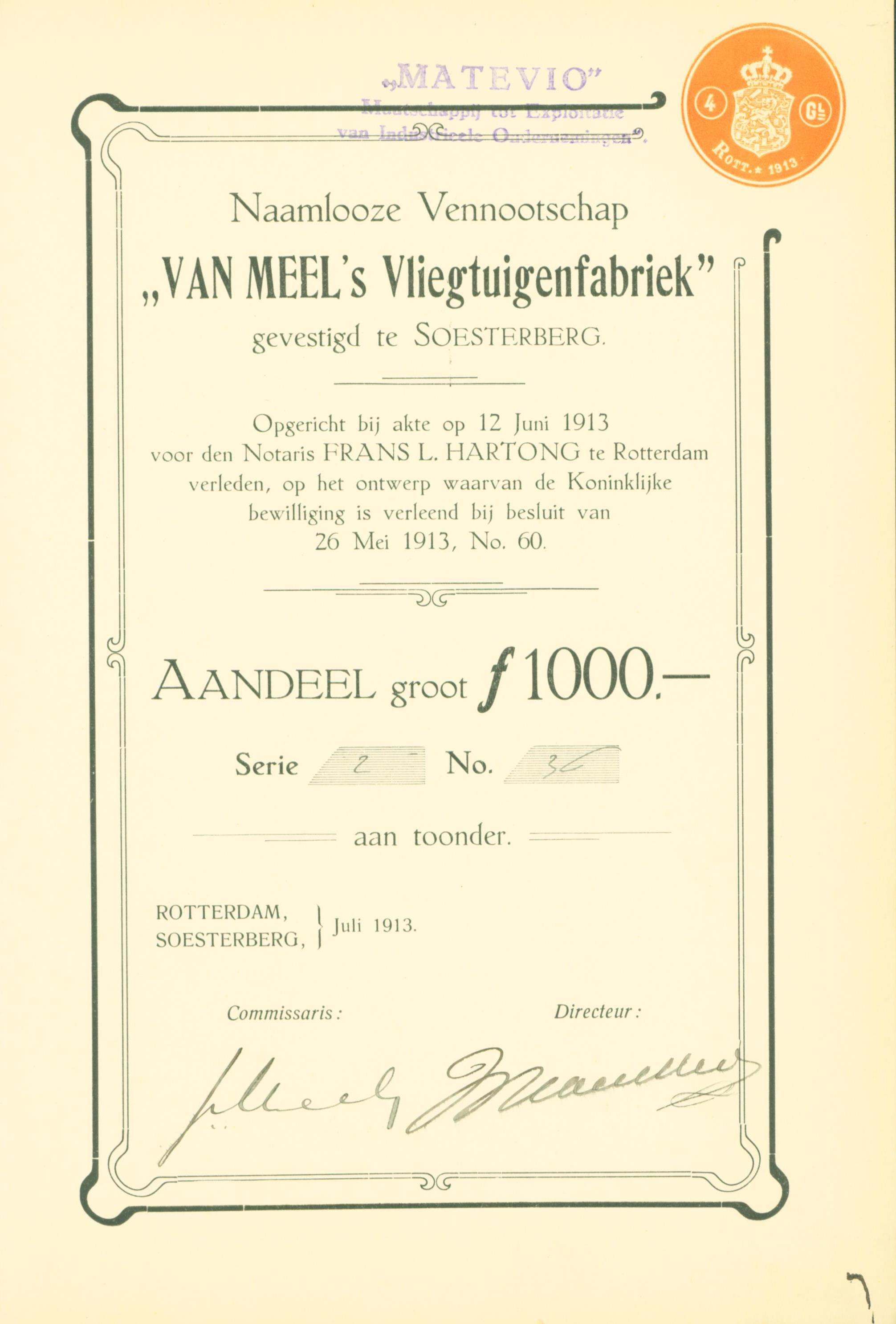
Share of the Van Meel's Vliegtuigenfabriek, issued July 1913

- van Meel Brikken original version
- van Meel Brikken II Two-seater
- van Meel Brikken II Waterbrik
- van Meel Brikken III Two-seater

=== Van Pomer ===
(John Van Pomer, Fort Edward, New York, United States)

- Van Pomer 1910 Biplane

=== Van Valkenberg ===
(Eber H Van Valkenberg Aircraft Co, McKeesport, Pennsylvania and Toledo, Ohio, United States)(Van Valkenberg Aircraft Limited, Edmonton, Alberta, Canada)

- Van Valkenberg 1927 Monoplane
- Van Valkenberg VM-11
- Van Valkenberg M-2(CF-ATT)(1933)
- Van Valkenberg BM-3 Bayamo(1935)

=== Van's ===
(Van's Aircraft Inc, North Plains, Oregon, United States)

- Van's RV-3
- Van's RV-4
- Van's RV-5 Swinger
- Van's RV-6
- Van's RV-7
- Van's RV-8
- Van's RV-9
- Van's RV-10
- Van's RV-11
- Van's RV-12
- Van's RV-14
- Van's RV-15

=== Vancil ===
(Belton, South Carolina, United States)

- Vancil Spitz S1

=== VanDellen ===
(Lubert VanDellen, Pella, Indiana or Oklahoma City, Oklahoma, United States)

- Van Dellen LH-2

=== Vance ===
(Vance Aircraft Inc, Fresno and Oakland, California, United States)

- Vance 1923 Biplane
- Viking Cargo Plane
- Vance Viking
- Vance M-1 Golden Arrow
- Vance V-1 Golden Arrow
- Vance V-S-1 Baby Lark
- Vance Flying Wing Express
- Vance Texas Sky Ranger

=== Vancil ===
(A. Vancil)

- Vancil Spitz S1

=== Vanderford ===
(William Vanderford, Gladbrook, Iowa, United States)

- Vanderford 1923 Monoplane

=== VanGrunsven ===
(Richard VanGrunsven)

- VanGrunsven RV-1

=== Vanguard ===
(Vanguard Air and Marine Corp (pres: Edward Vanderlip), Radnor, Pennsylvania, United States)

- Vanguard Model 2C
- Vanguard Model 2D Omniplane

=== Melvin Vaniman ===
(Melvin Vaniman)

- Vaniman Triplane 1bis

=== Vantuil ===
(Ibbs "Dutch" Vantuil)

- Vantuil Flying Dutchman

=== Varga ===
(László Varga / Repülő Muszaki Intézet (RMI)) Data from:

- Varga X\G
- Varga X\H
- Varga X\N
- Varga V\G
- Varga Z\G

=== Varga ===
((George) Varga, Chandler, Arizona, United States)

- Varga 2150 Kachina
- Varga 2150A Kachina
- Varga 2180
- Varga 2180TG

=== =Varney ===
(Walter T Varney Aeroplanes, 832 Post St, San Francisco, California, United States)

- Varney 1921 Biplane

=== Vashon Aircraft ===
(Woodinville, Washington, United States)

- Vashon Ranger R7

=== VBS ===
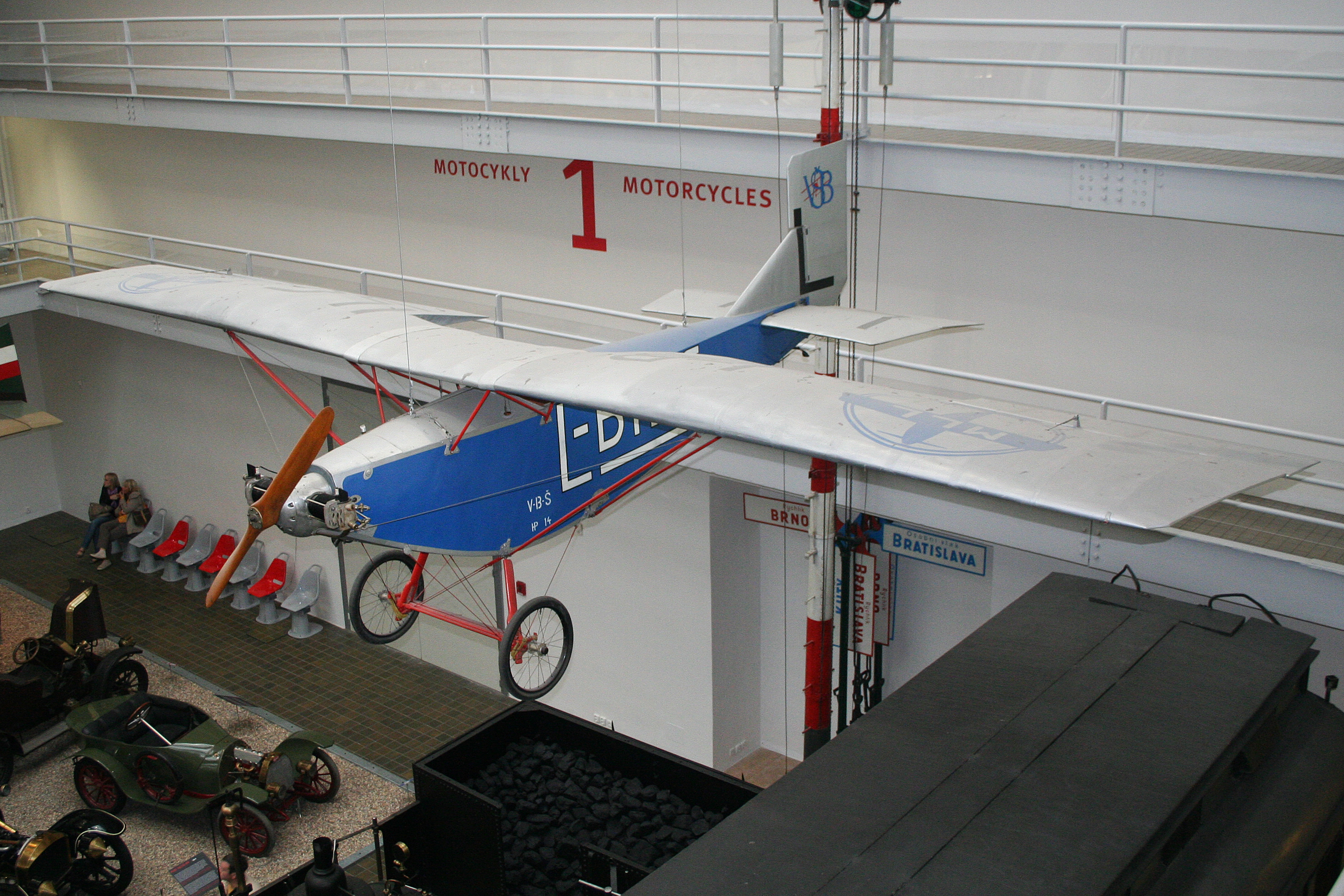

- VBS Kunkadlo

=== VEB ===
(VEB Flugzeugwerke, Dresden, East Germany)

- VEB 14, Ilyushin Il-14 built under license

=== =Vecihi Hürkuş ===
- Vecihi K-VI
- Vecihi K-XIV
- Vecihi K-XV
- Vecihi K-XVI Nuri Bey

=== VEF ===
(Valsts Elektrotehniskā Fabrika - State Electrotechnical Factory)

- VEF I-1 Spriditis (Pulins P-2)
- VEF I-2 Ikars (Pulins P-3)
- VEF I-3
- VEF I-4 Vanadzins
- VEF I-5 Ikars
- VEF I-6 Gambija
- VEF I-7 Zilais Putns
- VEF I-8 Zilais Putns II – K.Irbitis
- VEF I-8a – K.Irbitis
- VEF I-9 Kaija
- VEF I-11 - K.Irbitis
- VEF I-12
- VEF I-14
- VEF I-15
- VEF I-16
- VEF I-17
- VEF I-19
- VEF JDA 1936 fighter
- VEF JDA-10M
- VEF-1 modified Grüne Post
- VEF SV-5 (Stampe et Vertongen SV-5) - 6 built

=== Vega ===
(Walter T Varney Aeroplanes / Vega Aircraft Co. Burbank, California, United States)

- Vega 35-67
- Vega 37
- Vega 140
- Vega B-40
- Vega 1 Flying Test Stand
- Vega Model 2 Starliner
- Vega Model 22 Starliner
- Vega Model 24 Starliner

=== Vejraska ===
(Victor Vejraska, Friend, Nebraska, United States)

- Vejraska Arrow

=== Veleria Dedalo ===
(Gradara, Italy)

- Veleria Dedalo Strike-T

=== Velie ===
(Velie Motor Co.)

- Velie Monocoupe

=== Velocity ===
(Velocity Inc, Sebastian, Florida and Lincoln, California, United States)

- Velocity SE
- Velocity XL
- Velocity 173
- Velocity Delta Hawk
- Velocity Standard
- Velocity V-Twin

=== Vendôme ===
(Raoul Vendôme)

- Odier-Vendôme 1909 Biplane
- Vendôme III
- Vendôme La Moustique

=== Venga ===
(Venga Aircraft Inc.)

- Venga TG-10 Brushfire

=== Ventura ===
(La Frette, Isère, France)

- Ventura 1200

=== Venture ===
- Venture T-211

=== Verdaguer ===
- Verdaguer FVA (tandem biplane bi-motor)

=== Verhees Engineering ===
(Lommel, Belgium)

- Verhees D-Plane 1

=== Verilite ===
(Verilite Aircraft Co, div of De Vore Aviation (pres: Gil De Vore), Albuquerque, New Mexico, United States)

- Verilite Model 100 Sunbird

=== Verner ===
- Verner W-01 Brouček

=== Verrue ===
(Maurice Verrue)

- Verrue Mighty Midjet

=== Vertak ===
(Vertak Corp, Troy, Ohio, United States)

- Vertak S-229 ESTOL

=== Vertaplane ===
see Herrick

=== Vertical ===
(Vertical Aviation Technologies Inc (pres: Brad Clark), Sanford, Florida, United States/ Vertical Aviation Technology / VAT)

- VAT S-52-3
- Vertical Hummingbird
- Vertical Hummingbird 260L
- Vertical Hummingbird 300LS
- Vertical Elite

=== Verticraft ===
- Verticraft Verticar

=== Vertol ===
(Vertol Aircraft Corporation after name change from Piasecki Helicopter Corporation in 1955; United States)

- Vertol H-16
- Vertol H-21 Shawnee
- Vertol H-25 Retriever
- Vertol HC-1A - CH-46 Sea Knight
- Vertol HC-1B - CH-47 Chinook
- Vertol VZ-2
- Vertol HRB Sea Knight
- Vertol HUP
- Vertol CH-125 RCAF
- Vertol CH-127 RCAF
- Vertol CH-113 Labrador Canadian Armed Forces
- Vertol 44 - same aircraft as VZ-2
- Vertol 76
- Vertol 107 - company model number for prototype Sea Knight
- Vertol 114 - HC-1B

=== Verville ===
( (Alfred V) Verville Aircraft Co, Green & Melville Aves, Detroit, Michigan, United States)

- Verville 1915 Biplane
- Verville 104-A Air Coach
- Verville 104-C Air Coach
- Verville 104-P Air Coach
- Verville AT Sportsman
- Verville AT-4 Sportsman
- Verville LT Sportsman
- Verville PT-10
- Verville VCP
- Verville-Packard R-1 (a.k.a. Verville-Packard (Sperry) Racer)
- Verville-Sperry R-3 (a.k.a. Verville-Packard (Sperry) Racer)
- Verville-Sperry M-1 Messenger
- Buhl-Verville CA-3 Airster

=== Vervoost Leichtflugzeuge ===
(Sinzig, Germany)

- Vervoost FV-3 Delphin

=== VFTHB ===
(Versuchsflugzeugbau Technische Hochschule Breslau)

- Schmeidler SN-2

=== VFW-Fokker ===
(Germany/Netherlands)

- VFW-Fokker 614
- VFW-Fokker H2
- VFW-Fokker H3
- VFW-Fokker FK-3
- VFW-Fokker Sirius
- VFW-Fokker SG 1262

=== VGO ===
(Versuchsbau G.m.b.H. Gotha-Ost)

- VGO.I (RM L.I - Reichs Marine Landflugzeug 1 (Reich Navy Landplane 1))
- VGO.II
- VGO.III

=== Viberti ===
(Ali Verberti SpA)

- Viberti Musca 1

=== Vickers/Vickers-Armstrong ===
(United Kingdom) (See Also Supermarine)

- Vickers Type 123
- Vickers Type 141
- Vickers Type 143
- Vickers Type 150
- Vickers Type 161
- Vickers Type 163
- Vickers Type 177
- Vickers Type 255
- Vickers Type 432
- Vickers Boxkite
- Vickers E.F.B.1
- Vickers E.F.B.2
- Vickers E.F.B.3
- Vickers E.S.1
- Vickers F.B.5 "Gunbus"
- Vickers F.B.7
- Vickers F.B.8
- Vickers F.B.9
- Vickers F.B.11
- Vickers F.B.12
- Vickers F.B.14
- Vickers F.B.16
- Vickers F.B.19
- Vickers F.B.24
- Vickers F.B.25
- Vickers Jockey
- Vickers Valentia
- Vickers Valetta
- Vickers Valiant
- Vickers Valparaiso
- Vickers Vampire
- Vickers Vanguard
- Vickers Vanox
- Vickers Varsity
- Vickers VC.1 Viking
- Vickers VC-10
- Vickers Vellore
- Vickers Vendace
- Vickers Venom
- Vickers Venture
- Vickers Vernon
- Vickers Vespa
- Vickers Viastra
- Vickers Victoria
- Vickers Viking
- Vickers Vildebeest
- Vickers Vimy
- Vickers Vincent
- Vickers Vireo
- Vickers Virginia
- Vickers Viscount
- Vickers Vixen
- Vickers Vulcan
- Vickers Warwick
- Vickers Wellesley
- Vickers Wellington
- Vickers Wellington Ic "Air Controlled Interception"
- Vickers Wellington DWI Mark II
- Vickers Wibault
- Vickers Windsor

=== Vickers ===
(Vickers Aircraft Company)

- Vickers Aircraft Wave

=== Vickers ===
(Vickers plc)

- see: Vickers-Armstrongs

=== Victa ===
(Victa Limited, Australia)

- Victa Aircruiser
- Victa Airtourer
- Victa Model 67
- Victa R-2

=== Victor ===
(Victor Metal Aircraft Co, Camden, New Jersey, United States)

- Victor G-1 Sportster
- Victor-Knoll VK-1

=== Victory ===
(Victory Aircraft Engr Co (pres: Forrest W Hicks), Victory Airport, North Hollywood, California)

- Victory SS-1

=== Vidal ===
(Jerry Vidal)

- Vidal Plane-a-copter

=== Vidervol-Szaraz ===
(James Vidervol & Arpad Szaraz, Cleveland, Ohio, United States)

- Vidervol-Szaraz VS-1

=== Vidor ===
(Giuseppe Vidor, Italy)

- Vidor Whiskey IV
- Vidor Champion V
- Vidor Junior VI
- Vidor Asso X Jewel

=== Viel ===
(Maurice Viel)

- Viel MV.1

=== Vieweg ===
(Otto C Vieweg, Seattle, Washington, United States)

- Vieweg B-1-A

=== VIH ===
(Vliegtuig Industrie Holland, Netherlands)

- VIH Holland H.1
- VIH Holland H.2

=== Viking Aircraft Inc ===
(Panama City Beach, Florida, United States)

- Viking Aircraft Viking II

=== Viking Aircraft LLC ===
(Viking Aircraft LLC, Elkhorn, Wisconsin)

- Viking SF-2A Cygnet
- Viking Dragonfly

=== Viking ===
(Viking Flying Boat Co, 89 Shelton Ave, New Haven, Connecticut, United States)

- Viking B-8 Kittyhawk
- Viking OO
- Viking V-2

=== Villasana ===
(TNCA / Juan Guillermo Villasana)

- Villasana Series H (TNCA H)
- Villasana Latino America
- Villasana 1924 helicopter

=== Villamil ===
(Federico Cantero Villamil)

- Villamil Libélula Viblandi

=== Villars ===
(Maurice Villars)

- Villars MV.10

=== Villiers ===
(Ateliers d'Aviation François Villiers, Meudon)

- Villiers II
- Villiers IV
- Villiers V
- Villiers XI
- Villiers VIII
- Villiers XXIV
- Villiers 26
- Villiers 31

=== Villish ===
- Villish VM-5

=== Vincent ===
(Guy O Vincent, Centerburg and Zanesville, Ohio, United States)

- Vincent Three seat Biplane
- Vincent Two seat Biplane

=== Vine ===
(S.W. Vine, Krugersdorp, Traansval)

- Vine 1930 glider
- Vine Altis (V1, V2 & V3)

=== Vintage Ultralight ===
(Vintage Ultralight and Lightplane Association, Marietta, Georgia, United States)

- Chotia Gypsy
- Chotia Woodhopper
- Hovey Whing Ding
- Mathews Mr Easy
- Vintage Ultralight SR-1 Hornet

=== Vinters ===
- see Vickers-Armstrongs

=== Vintras-Bouillier ===
(Jean Pierre Vintras et Lucien Bouillier)

- Vintras-Bouillier VB-20 Isard

=== Viper ===
(Viper Aircraft Corporation, Pasco, Washington, United States)

- Viper Aircraft ViperJet
- Viper Aircraft ViperFan
- Viper Aircraft FanJet

=== Virmoux ===
(M Virmoux)

- Virmoux V.1
- Virmoux V.2

=== ViS ===
(Vyacheslav i Svetlana Shkurenko)

- ViS Sprint
- ViS Sprint SKh
- KkAZ ViS-3
- KkAZ ViS-5
- Kharkiv KhAZ-30
- KkAZ ХАЗ-30

=== VisionAire Corp ===
(VisionAire Corp, Chesterfield, Missouri, United States

- VisionAire Vantage

=== VL ===
(Valtion Lentokonetehdas)

- VL D.27 Haukka I, II
- VL Humu
- VL Kotka I, II
- VL Myrsky
- VL Paarma
- VL Pyry
- VL Pyörremyrsky
- VL Sääski I, II, IIA
- VL Tuisku I, II
- VL Viima I, II

=== VL-DDR ===
- VL-DDR 152

=== Vlaicu 1909-1914 ===
(Aurel Vlaicu)

- A Vlaicu I
- A Vlaicu II
- A Vlaicu III

=== Vogt ===
(Designer: Alfred Voght)

- Vogt Lo-100
- Vogt Lo-105 Zwergreiher
- Vogt Lo-150
- Vogt Lo-170

=== Vogt-Stockhausen ===
(Karl Vogt and Johann Stockhausen)

- Vogt-Stockhausen Adler

=== Voisin ===
(Société Anonyme des Aéroplanes G. Voisin, France)

- Voisin 1907 biplane
- Voisin Type de Course
- Voisin 1909 Tractor Biplane Voisin tractor biplane
- Voisin 1910 Paris-Bordeaux racer
- Voisin 1910 de-Caters biplane
- Voisin 1911 military type
- Voisin 1911 Military Canard II Voisin Canard
- Voisin 1912 Icare Seaplane Voisin Icare Aero-Yacht
- Voisin 1915 Triplane
- Voisin 1916 armoured reconnaissance aircraft
- Voisin E.28 (1916 triplane)
- Voisin E.50 (1917 triplane project)
- Voisin E.53 (1916 triplane with cannon for ground attack project)
- Voisin E.54
- Voisin E.59
- Voisin E.87 (Type XII)
- Voisin E.94 (Voisin 11 Bn.2)
- Voisin-Farman I
- Voisin L (Type I and II)
- Voisin III (Voisin Type III / LA / LAS)
- Voisin IVCanon (Voisin Type 4 / LB / LBS)
- Voisin V (LAS)
- Voisin VI (LAS)
- Voisin VII (7 A.2 / LC)
- Voisin VIII (8 Bn.2 / LAP) (8 Ca.2 / LBP)
- Voisin IX (9 A.2 / LC)
- Voisin X (10 / LAR / LBR)
- Voisin XI (11 Bn.2 / E.94)
- Voisin XII (12 Bn.2)
- Voisin XIII
- Voisin LA (III)
- Voisin LAR (X Bn.2)
- Voisin LAS designation used three times (III, V & VI)
- Voisin LAP (VIII Bn.2)
- Voisin LB (V)
- Voisin LBP (VIII Ca.2)
- Voisin LBR (X Ca.2)
- Voisin LBS (V Ca.2)
- Voisin LC designation used twice (VII A.2 and IX A.2)
- Voisin M
- Voisin O
- Voisin Creme de Menthe
- Voisin Wild Duck
- Voisin Canon 1913

=== Vol Xerpa ===
(Barcelona, Spain)

- Vol Xerpa ULM Pulsar

=== Volaire ===
(Volaircraft Inc (fdr: Jack Gilberti), Aliquippa, Pennsylvania, United States)

- Volaire 10
- Volaire 1035
- Volaire 1050

=== Volante ===
(Volante Aircraft Co (fdr: K P Rice), Santa Ana, California, United States)

- Volante Flying Car

=== Voliamo ===
- Voliamo San Francesco

=== Volland ===
- Volland V-10

=== Volmer Jensen ===
(Volmer Jensen, Burbank, California, United States)

- Volmer Sport
- Volmer VJ-21 Jaybird
- Volmer VJ-22 Sportsman (a.k.a. Chubasco)
- Volmer VJ-23 Swingwing
- Volmer VJ-24W SunFun

=== Volocopter ===
- Volocopter 2X

=== Volpar ===
(Volpar Inc (Volitan & Paragon Corps), Van Nuys, California, United States)

- Volpar (Beechcraft) 18
- Volpar (Beechcraft) Super 18
- Volpar (Beechcraft) Turbo 18
- Volpar (Beechcraft) Super Turbo 18
- Volpar (Beechcraft) C-45G
- Volpar (Beechcraft) Turboliner
- Volpar (Beechcraft) Turboliner II
- Volpar (Beechcraft) Model 4000

=== Volta Volare ===
- Volta Volare GT4

=== VoltAero ===
- VoltAero Cassio

=== von Cosel ===
(Carl T von Cosel, Key West, Florida, United States)

- von Cosel 1930 Monoplane

=== von Hagen ===
(Alex von Hagen, Seattle, Washington, United States)

- von Hagen Flyer

=== Von Hoffman ===
(Von Hoffman Aircraft Co, St Louis, Missouri, United States)

- Von Hoffman TP

=== Vortech ===
- Vortech Skylark
- Vortech A/W 95
- Vortech Choppy
- Vortech Commuter
- Vortech G-1
- Vortech Hot Rod
- Vortech Kestrel Jet
- Vortech Meg-2XH Strap-On
- Vortech Scorpion
- Vortech Scorpion II
- Vortech Shadow
- Vortech Sparrow

=== Vortex ===
(Vortex Aircraft Co, San Diego, California, United States)

- Vortex PhoenixJet

=== Vos ===
(Marquand Vos / Helicopter Manufacturing Company)

- Vos Springbok

=== Votaw ===
(Vortex Aircraft Co, San Diego, California, United States)

- Votaw W-2V

=== Vought ===
(De Witt C Vought )

- Vought 1911 aeroplane

=== Vought ===
(Vought (Chance Vought), Lewis & Vought, Vought-Sikorsky, Vought Corporation, United States)

- Vought A-7 Strikefighter
- Vought A-7 Corsair II
- Vought AU
- Vought-Hiller-Ryan C-142
- Vought F-8 Crusader
- Vought FU
- Vought F2U
- Vought F3U
- Vought F4U Corsair
- Vought XF5U Flying Pancake
- Vought F6U Pirate
- Vought F7U Cutlass
- Vought F8U Crusader
- Vought O-28
- Vought O2U
- Vought O3U
- Vought O4U
- Vought O5U
- Vought OS2U Kingfisher
- Vought OSU
- Vought S2U
- Vought SBU Corsair
- Vought SB2U Vindicator
- Vought SB3U
- Vought SO2U
- Vought SU
- Vought TBU Sea Wolf production as TBY from Consolidated Aircraft
- Vought UF
- Vought UO
- Vought WU
- Vought O24-2
- Vought V-50 Corsair
- Vought V-65 Corsair
- Vought V-66 Corsair
- Vought V-70 Corsair
- Vought V-80 Corsair
- Vought V-80P Corsair
- Vought V-85 Kurier
- Vought V-85G Kurier
- Vought V-90 Corsair
- Vought V-92 Corsair
- Vought V-93 Corsair
- Vought V-97 Corsair
- Vought V-99M Corsair
- Vought Corsair Junior
- Vought V-135
- Vought V-141
- Vought V-142
- Vought V-143
- Vought V-150
- Vought V-156 Vindicator
- Vought V-162
- Vought V-166
- Vought V-162
- Vought V-173
- Vought V-326
- Vought V-354
- Vought VE-7 Bluebird
- Vought VE-8
- Vought VE-9
- Vought VE-10 Bat Boat
- Vought VE-135
- Vought VS-315
- Vought-Cicero Umbrellaplane
- Vought Chesapeake
- Vought AXV V-143
- Vought Navy Experimental Type V Interceptor Fighter V-143
- Vought Model 1600
- Vought XF5U
- Vought X-100

=== VPM ===
(VPM SnC - Vittorio Magni)

- VPM MT-5
- VPM MT-7

=== VSR ===
(VanMeter Smith Racing, Wichita, Kansas, United States)

- VSR SR-1 Snoshoo

=== VTOL Aircraft ===
- VTOL Aircraft Phillicopter

=== Vuia ===
(Trajan Vuia)

- Vuia I
- Vuia II
- Vuia III
- Vuia No.1 helicopter 1908
- Vuia No.2 helicopter 1921

=== Vulcanair ===
(Italy)

- Vulcanair Canguro
- Vulcanair Mission
- Vulcanair V1.0

=== Vultee ===
((Gerard Freebairn) Vultee Aircraft Div, Aviation Mfg Corp-AVCO, Downey, California, United States)

- Vultee A-19
- Vultee A-31 Vengeance
- Vultee A-35 Vengeance
- Vultee A-41
- Vultee BC-3
- Vultee BT-13 Valiant
- Vultee BT-15
- Vultee BT-16
- Vultee P-54 Swoose Goose
- Vultee P-48
- Vultee P-66 Vanguard
- Vultee P-68 Tornado
- Vultee SNV
- Vultee TBV
- Vultee AB-2
- Vultee V-1
- Vultee V-11
- Vultee V-12
- Vultee 48
- Vultee 51
- Vultee 54
- Vultee 61
- Vultee V-72
- Vultee 74
- Vultee 75
- Vultee 76
- Vultee V-77
- Vultee 84
- Vultee 85
- Vultee 86
- Vultee 88
- Vultee 90
- Vultee YA-19

=== VUT ===
- VUT 001 Marabu

=== VZLU ===
- VZLÚ HC-4
- VZLU TOM-8
