= Type 31 =

Type 31 may refer to:

- Type 31 frigate, a class of Frigate currently being built for the Royal Navy
- Type 31 75 mm mountain gun, a field gun of the Imperial Japanese Army
- a version of the M2 mortar produced in the Republic of China
- Type 31 Grampus I, a variant of the Bristol Grampus, an early British prototype aircraft
- Villiers 31, an early French passenger aircraft
- Tupolev Tu-85, a Soviet prototype aircraft, designated as Type 31 by the US Air Force
- Hispano-Suiza Type 31, an early Spanish aircraft engine
- Peugeot Type 31, an early French motor vehicle
- an early Datsun motor vehicle
- Type 31 Alphabetical Duplicating Punch, an IBM keypunch
