= Vickers F.B.24 =

British two-seat fighter aircraft

F.B.24

General information
- Type: Two-seat fighter
- National origin: United Kingdom
- Manufacturer: Vickers

History
- First flight: 1917

The Vickers F.B.24 was a British two-seat fighter aircraft of the First World War. Only a few prototypes were built, as, although it had good performance, the Bristol F.2 Fighter was preferred.

== Design and development ==
In the early years of the First World War, Vickers Limited designed a number of aircraft to use the 150 hp (112 kW) Hart radial engine, the development of which was being funded by Vickers, including two single-seat fighters, the F.B.12 pusher and the tractor F.B.16. A third design planned to use the Hart was the F.B.24, a two-seat fighter reconnaissance aircraft.

The Hart engine proved to be unreliable, however, and was abandoned prior to the first prototype being completed in December 1916, and it became necessary to find a new powerplant for the F.B.24, with the Hispano-Suiza 8 being chosen. The first two prototypes, the F.B.24A and F.B.24B used a 150 hp Hispano-Suiza, with the first probably flying in March 1917. but were converted to use a 200 hp (149 kW) Hispano-Suiza, becoming the F.B.24D. The F.B.24D was a two-bay biplane with a rectangular section fuselage. The pilot and observer/gunner sat close together in separate open cockpits, with the pilot directly under the upper wings. Despite transparent panels built into the upper wings, the pilot's view was very poor.

The F.B.24C was similar to the Hispano-Suiza powered aircraft, but was slightly larger and heavier, and was powered by a 275 hp (205 kW) Lorraine-Dietrich 8Bd water-cooled V8, with the cylinder blocks being enclosed in bulky fairings that protruded from the upper corners of the cowling, further restricting the pilot's view. The type was tested by the French, and although Vickers claimed good performance, the French found the aircraft's climb performance not as claimed by Vickers, and the type was not adopted. The F.B.24E was an attempt to improve the poor view for the pilot, with the fuselage being raised so that the top was level with the upper wing, and the pilot sitting with his head protruding through the gap between the two wing spars.

The final version was the F.B.24G. This was of similar layout to the F.B.24E, but was larger still, and was powered by a 375 hp (280 kW) Lorraine-Dietrich V12 engine, the single example being built by Darracq in France, not flying until after the end of the war.

== Variants ==
F.B.24A
First prototype - 150 hp (112 kW) Hispano-Suiza 8 engine.
F.B.24B
Second prototype.
F.B.24C
Powered by 275 hp (205 kW) Lorraine-Dietrich 8Bd engine.
F.B.24D
Powered by 200 hp (149 kW) Hispano-Suiza engine.
F.B.24E
Example with raised fuselage to improve pilot's view. Powered by 200 hp Hispano-Suiza or Wolseley Viper engine.
F.B.24G
Larger fighter, powered by 375 hp (280 kW) Lorraine-Dietrich V-12 engine. One built postwar by Darracq in France.

== Specifications (F.B.24C) ==
Data from British Aeroplanes 1914–1918

General characteristics

- Crew: two
- Length: 26 ft 6 in (8.08 m)
- Upper wingspan: 37 ft 6 in (11.43 m)
- Lower wingspan: 31 ft 0 in (9.45 m)
- Wing area: 384 sq ft (35.7 m^{2})
- Empty weight: 1,709 lb (775 kg)
- Gross weight: 2,650 lb (1,202 kg)
- Powerplant: 1 × Lorraine-Dietrich 8Bd water-cooled V8 engine, 275 hp (205 kW)

Performance

- Maximum speed: 129.5 mph (208.4 km/h, 112.5 kn) at 10,000 ft (3,050 m)
- Endurance: 3 hours
- Service ceiling: 23,000 ft (7,000 m) (absolute ceiling)
- Time to altitude:
  - 11 minutes to 10,000 ft (3,050 m)
  - 18 minutes to 15,000 ft (4,670 m)

Armament

- Guns: 2× fixed, forward firing, .303 inch (7.7 mm) Vickers machine guns and 1× Lewis Gun on Scarff ring in rear cockpit

== See also ==
Aircraft of comparable role, configuration, and era

- Bristol F.2 Fighter
