= Villiers 31 =

General information
- Type: Eight passenger airliner
- National origin: France
- Manufacturer: Ateliers d'Aviation François Villiers
- Number built: 1 or 2

History
- First flight: 1930

The Villiers 31 or Villiers 310 was a French eight passenger airliner of advanced construction. Owing to Villiers' financial failure, it was not developed.

== Design ==
Ateliers Villier's Type 31 was their last aircraft before they collapsed in 1931. A single engine monoplane of mixed construction, it was also their only passenger aircraft.

It was a high wing aircraft; the wing had constant chord out to rounded tips and had a wooden structure with plywood skinning. The Villiers XXIV had been the first French aircraft maker to use Handley Page slats and the Villiers 26 reconnaissance seaplane used a combination of automatically opening slats on the leading edge in front of the ailerons and another set which the pilot opened as he lowered the flaps. The Type 31 had a similar combination of automatic and commanded slats.

The Villiers 31 had a flat sided fuselage of rectangular cross-section behind the wing, built around a frame of chrome steel tubes and fabric covered. It was the first aircraft to have an autogenically welded structure, that is welded without the use of a filler metal. There was a 310 kW (420 hp) Gnome et Rhône 9Ab nine-cylinder radial engine in the nose, which some photographs show under a long-chord, close-fitting, circular cowling. Others show it uncowled. The two crew sat in a cockpit at the wing leading edge, the wing itself raised a little above the general fuselage line on a low fairing over the cabin, which seated eight and was lit by long strips of transparencies on each side. Access was via a rear starboard side door.

Like the rest of the fuselage the empennage was steel framed and fabric covered. The tailplanes were mounted just below the top of the fuselage, each braced from below with a single strut and carrying a balanced elevator. A curved, deep, balanced rudder, mounted on a small fin and slightly pointed on top, worked in elevator cut-outs. The airliner had a fixed tailwheel undercarriage. The two mainwheels were mounted independently on V-struts from the lower fuselage with near-vertical oleo struts to the wing roots. The mainwheels had brakes and the tailwheel was steerable.

== Operational history ==
The exact date of the first flight of the Villiers 31 is not known, though all reports on it are from 1930. On 13 March 1930 the Air Ministry concluded a contract for two Type 31s; one of them (F-AKCR) was certainly built.

== Specifications ==
Data from L'année aéronautique 1930-31. p.61

General characteristics

- Crew: two
- Capacity: eight
- Length: 14.10 m (46 ft 3 in)
- Wingspan: 19.20 m (63 ft 0 in)
- Height: 4.08 m (13 ft 5 in)
- Wing area: 56 m^{2} (600 sq ft)
- Empty weight: 1,950 kg (4,299 lb)
- Gross weight: 3,540 kg (7,804 lb)
- Fuel capacity: 400 kg (880 lb) fuel and oil
- Powerplant: 1 × Gnome et Rhône 9Ab 9-cylinder radial, 310 kW (420 hp)

Performance

- Maximum speed: 180 km/h (110 mph, 97 kn) at sea level
- Cruise speed: 160 km/h (99 mph, 86 kn)
- Service ceiling: 3,500 m (11,500 ft)
- Time to altitude: 1 hr to ceiling
