= Vickers Vampire =

British single-seat pusher biplane fighter

F.B.26 Vampire
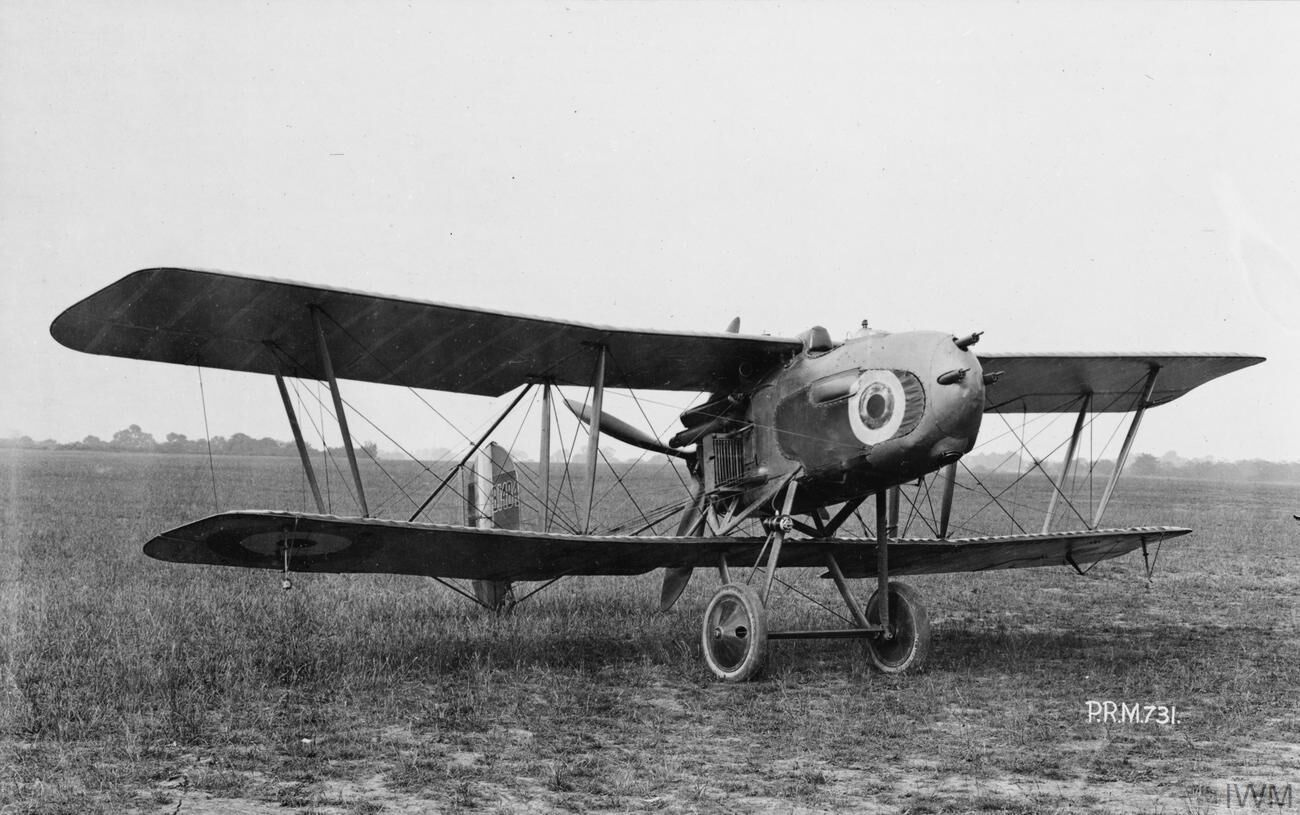

General information
- Type: Fighter
- National origin: United Kingdom
- Manufacturer: Vickers
- Status: Prototype
- Number built: 4

History
- First flight: May 1917
- Developed from: Vickers F.B.12

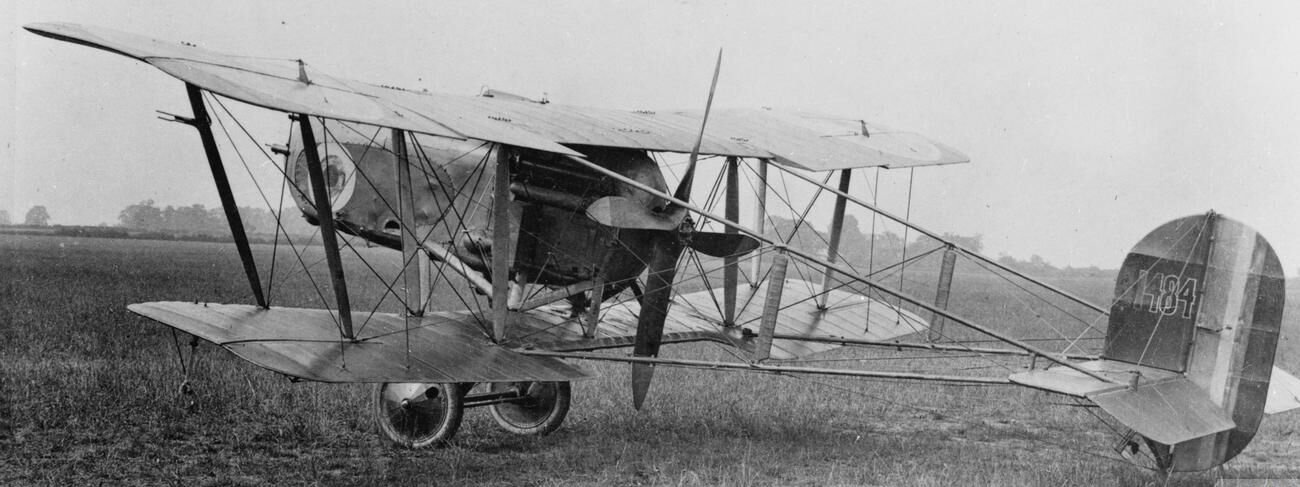

The Vickers F.B.26 Vampire was a British single-seat pusher biplane fighter built by Vickers during the First World War.

Four were built by Vickers at Bexleyheath, one of these was subsequently modified to become the F.B.26A.

== Design and development ==
The design was a development of the earlier Vickers F.B.12 prototypes; and was a two-bay biplane with a high-mounted nacelle for the pilot and an initial armament of two .303 in (7.7 mm) Lewis Guns. Behind this was a water-cooled 200 hp (150 kW) Hispano-Suiza engine driving the propeller. The tailplane was mounted on four booms with a single fin and rudder. After modifications to the radiator layout and wing structure and re-armed with three Lewis guns in an Eeman mounting capable of firing up at a 45° angle to engage enemy bombers from below, being numbered B1484, the FB.26 was passed to the Aeroplane and Armament Experimental Establishment at Martlesham Heath for evaluation. The prototype was destroyed on 25 August 1917 when Harold Barnwell, the Vickers test pilot failed to recover from a spin.

A second aircraft, B1486, was built and was operated first by No. 39 Squadron at Woodford and then passed to No. 141 Squadron of the Royal Flying Corps in February 1918. Service evaluation was unfavorable: although performance was satisfactory, its handling qualities were poor. A third aircraft, B1485, powered by a 230 hp (170 kW) Bentley rotary engine and modified for ground-attack was built in 1918 but by the time it was built the Sopwith Salamander had already been ordered for production and development was abandoned. Three further aircraft had been ordered and allocated service numbers but it is not known whether any of these were built.

== Operators ==
United Kingdom

- Royal Flying Corps
  - No. 39 Squadron RFC
  - No. 141 Squadron RFC

== Specifications (F.B.26 Vampire I) ==
Data from Vickers Aircraft since 1908

General characteristics

- Crew: 1
- Length: 23 ft 5 in (7.14 m)
- Upper wingspan: 31 ft 6 in (9.60 m)
- Lower wingspan: 29 ft 0 in (8.84 m)
- Height: 9 ft 5 in (2.87 m)
- Wing area: 267 sq ft (24.8 m^{2})
- Empty weight: 1,470 lb (667 kg)
- Gross weight: 2,030 lb (921 kg)
- Powerplant: 1 × Hispano-Suiza 8 water-cooled V-8, 200 hp (150 kW)

Performance

- Maximum speed: 121 mph (195 km/h, 105 kn) at 5,000 ft (1,500 m)
- Endurance: 3 hr
- Service ceiling: 20,500 ft (6,200 m)
- Absolute ceiling: 22,500 ft (6,900 m)
- Time to altitude: 10 min to 10,000 ft (3,000 m)

Armament

- Guns: 3 × 0.303 in (7.7 mm) Lewis Guns
