= Van Meel Brikken =

Brikken
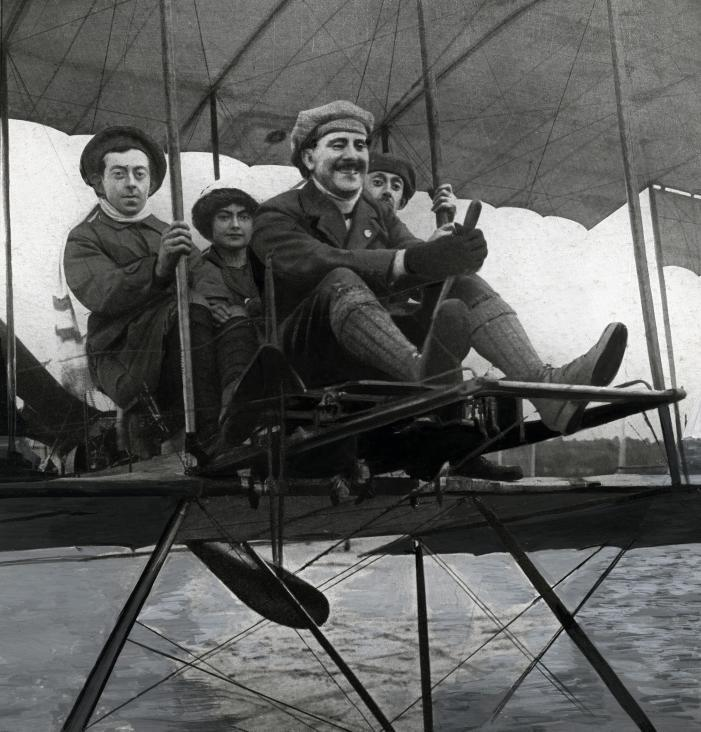
- van Meel at the controls

General information
- Type: Personal aircraft and trainer
- National origin: Netherlands
- Designer: Marinus van Meel

History
- First flight: early 1913

The Van Meel Brikken was an early Dutch Farman type biplane. Three were built, one being the first Dutch military aircraft and another the first Dutch water-borne one. Two were used by the Dutch Army Aircraft Division as trainers.

== Design and development ==
Marinus Van Meel learned to fly in 1911. His first aircraft was a Farman but this was destroyed in the winter of 1912/13 so he designed and built his own machine to replace it. The design was strongly influenced by his earlier aircraft, joining other types such as the Koolhoven Heidevogel of 1911 in the "Farman-type" category of the day. Nicknamed the Brikken (Brick), it was a two bay open frame biplane, with constant chord wings mounted without stagger but with considerable overhang and braced by parallel interplane struts and flying wires.

Initially the Brikken had a Farman style forward elevator but this was soon removed. The pilot sat exposed on or slightly ahead of the wing leading edge on a simple frame; the Gnome Omega seven cylinder rotary engine was mounted behind him at the trailing edge in pusher configuration, driving a two blade propeller. Its fuel tank was suspended under mid-chord. Behind the engine the fuselage consisted of two frames, with long parallel members vertically cross braced, arranged to converge in plan view to the tail. A large oval rudder was mounted on the final, common vertical with a tailplane above it.

The Brikken had a Farman style fixed undercarriage, with two wheels on each side on short axles attached at right angles to skids, upturned at the front. The front end of each skid was mounted on a single raked strut to the wing and the rear by a transverse V-pair with its upper ends below the aft inner and second interplane struts, further braced with wires, resulting in a wide track.

The Brikken flew for the first time, with its original forward elevator, in early 1913. By September Van Meel was flying a second, much modified version, a two-seater intended for military reconnaissance. This was bigger and had a rectangular cross-section nacelle stretching forward from the trailing edge well beyond of the leading edge, with the pilot at the front and an observer in tandem behind. The undercarriage was strengthened by replacing the single forward strut with a V to match the one at the rear. Later, this land undercarriage was replaced by floats, each attached by two pairs of struts fore and aft; in this form it was nicknamed the "Waterbrik". A third and final Brikken was first flown on 3 May 1914, similar to the second but fitted out as a trainer with dual controls; the skids were slightly altered by cutting off their upturned ends.

== Operational history ==
In July 1913 the Dutch army formed an aviation department, the Luchtvaartafdeling (LVA) and purchased the first Brikken, which remained their only aircraft until October. The first Dutch military aircraft, it was mostly used as a trainer and was in use until 1915.

The second machine, competing against a Farman and a Blériot, was not successful at the reconnaissance trials and the LVA did not buy it. After fitting floats, making it the first Dutch seaplane, Van Meel flew it successfully from the river Meuse at Tiel and was invited to demonstrate it to the Dutch Naval Aviation Service (MLD) at Rotterdam. Flying from there on a windy day with choppy seas and much surface traffic, the Waterbrik came close to colliding with the masts of a ship and Van Meel crashed in avoiding them. He was unhurt but no contract was won.

The last aircraft was bought by the LVA who used it as a dual control trainer until 1915.

== Variants ==
Original version
Developed Farman-type, initial forward elevator soon removed. LVA serial LA 1; used as a trainer.
Two seater/Waterbrik
Gondola to accommodate pilot and observer for military reconnaissance. Strengthened undercarriage. Not purchased by LVA; later fitted with floats.
Two seater
Similar to the second model but with dual control and further slight undercarriage modifications. Purchased by the LVA as LA 5.

== Specifications (Third aircraft) ==
Data from Wesselink

General characteristics

- Crew: Two
- Length: 11.0 m (36 ft 1 in)
- Wingspan: 16.00 m (52 ft 6 in)
- Gross weight: 650 kg (1,433 lb)
- Powerplant: 1 × Gnome Omega 7-cylindrer rotary engine, 45 kW (60 hp)
- Propellers: 2-bladed

Performance

- Maximum speed: 100 km/h (62 mph, 54 kn) approximately
