= Vakhmistrov I-Ze =

General information
- Type: Parasite fighter
- National origin: USSR
- Designer: Vladimir Sergeyevich Vakhmistrov

The Vakhmistrov I-Ze was a parasite fighter designed in the USSR in 1934-5.

== Development ==
To take the best advantage of parasite bomber/fighter combinations like the Vakhmistrov Zveno project, Vakhmistrov designed a special fighter to be carried by Kalinin VS-2 bombers. This aircraft was to have been a small low-wing monoplane powered by an 850 hp (630 kW) Gnome-Rhone GRKs engine. With a weight of only 1910 kg, it was expected that a top speed of 518 km/h (321 mph) would be attainable. Weight was to be kept to a minimum by the use of a centerline skid undercarriage and small dimensions:- a wingspan of 7.75m (25 ft 5in) and a wing area of only 10 m^{2} (110 sq ft). Construction of the prototype was started but discontinued in 1936 when support faded for the Zvyeno ("link") concept, as the supporters were eliminated in the Stalinist purges.

== Specifications (I-Ze) ==
Data from

General characteristics

- Crew: one
- Wingspan: 7.75 m (25 ft 5 in)
- Wing area: 10 m^{2} (110 sq ft)
- Gross weight: 1,910 kg (4,211 lb)
- Powerplant: 1 × GRKs , 630 kW (850 hp)

Performance

- Maximum speed: 518 km/h (322 mph, 280 kn)

== See also ==
Aircraft of comparable role, configuration, and era

- Curtiss F9C Sparrowhawk
- de Havilland DH.53 Humming Bird
- Republic RF-84K Thunderjet FICON project
