= Vancil Spitz S1 =

American homebuilt aircraft

General information
- Type: Homebuilt aircraft
- National origin: United States
- Manufacturer: A. Vancil
- Status: Production completed
- Number built: At least one

History
- Introduction date: late 1990s
- Developed from: Pitts S-1

The Vancil Spitz S1 is an American homebuilt aircraft that was designed and produced by A. Vancil of Belton, South Carolina, introduced in the late 1990s. When it was available the aircraft was supplied as a kit and also in the form of plans for amateur construction.

== Design and development ==
The Spitz S1 is an ultralight replica of the Pitts S-1 aerobatic biplane. It features a biplane layout, a single-seat open cockpit, fixed conventional landing gear and a single engine in tractor configuration.

The aircraft was designed to comply with the US FAR 103 Ultralight Vehicles rules, including the category's maximum empty weight of 254 lb (115 kg). The aircraft has a standard empty weight of 254 lb (115 kg). It can also be placed in the Experimental - Amateur-built category.

The Spitz S1 is made from metal tubing and wood, with its flying surfaces and tail covered in doped aircraft fabric and the fuselage covered in sheet aluminium. Its 18.27 ft (5.6 m) span wing has a wing area of 116 sq ft (10.8 m^{2}). The standard engine used is the 48 hp (36 kW) Christine Aero powerplant.

The aircraft has a typical empty weight of 254 lb (115 kg) and a gross weight of 475 lb (215 kg), giving a useful load of 221 lb (100 kg). With full fuel of 5 U.S. gallons (19 L; 4.2 imp gal) the payload for the pilot and baggage is 191 lb (87 kg).

== Variants ==
S1 ultralight version
With a maximum speed of 90 mph (140 km/h).
S1 homebuilt version
With a maximum speed of 120 mph (190 km/h).

== Specifications (version) ==
Data from AeroCrafter

General characteristics

- Crew: one
- Length: 15.23 ft (4.64 m)
- Wingspan: 18.27 ft (5.57 m)
- Wing area: 116.0 sq ft (10.78 m^{2})
- Empty weight: 254 lb (115 kg)
- Gross weight: 475 lb (215 kg)
- Fuel capacity: 5 U.S. gallons (19 L; 4.2 imp gal)
- Powerplant: 1 × Christine Aero aircraft engine, 48 hp (36 kW)
- Propellers: 2-bladed wooden, fixed pitch

Performance

- Maximum speed: 90 mph (140 km/h, 78 kn)
- Cruise speed: 63 mph (101 km/h, 55 kn)
- Stall speed: 25 mph (40 km/h, 22 kn)
- Wing loading: 4.08 lb/sq ft (19.9 kg/m^{2})
