= Valley Engineering Backyard Flyer =

Backyard Flyer
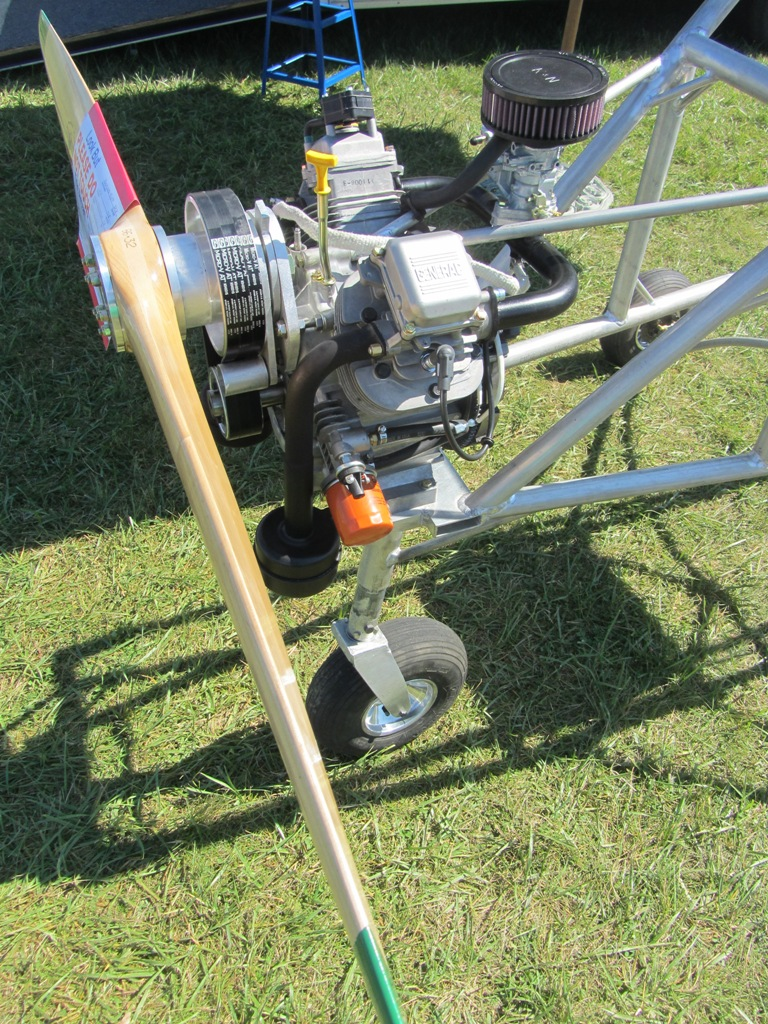
- Engine installation

General information
- Type: Ultralight aircraft
- National origin: United States
- Manufacturer: Valley Engineering, Rolla, Missouri
- Designer: Gene Smith and Larry Smith
- Number built: Approx 20

The Valley Engineering Backyard Flyer is an American single-seat ultralight aircraft.

== Design and development ==
The BackYard Flyer is a high wing single-engine conventional landing gear or tricycle gear aircraft. The aircraft was built to comply with FAA part 103 rules for ultralight aircraft. The fuselage is constructed of welded aluminum tubing. The cantilever main wing is capable of rotating 90 degrees for storage without removal from the fuselage. The 40 hp engine uses a Valley Engineering Series Three PSRU. Aircraft are sold with a Ballistic Recovery Systems parachute installation. After about 20 aircraft were built the production was postponed with plans to restart building in early 2022.

== Variants ==
- The Backyard Flyer can be configured as a conventional or tricycle gear aircraft, with a covered or open fuselage.

== Specifications (BackYard Flyer) ==
Data from Kitplanes, Manufacturer

General characteristics

- Crew: one
- Length: 26 ft (7.9 m)
- Empty weight: 252 lb (114 kg)
- Gross weight: 600 lb (272 kg)
- Powerplant: 1 × Generac 992cc V-twin four cycle, 38 hp (28 kW)
- Propellers: 2-bladed Culver

Performance

- Cruise speed: 48 kn (55 mph, 89 km/h)
