= Venga TG-10 =

TG-10 Brushfire

General information
- Type: Military Jet Trainer
- National origin: Canada
- Manufacturer: Venga Aerospace Systems
- Status: Cancelled after sole prototype destroyed
- Primary user: None
- Number built: 1

The Venga TG-10 Brushfire was a military trainer aircraft developed in Canada in the late 1980s. The sole prototype was destroyed in a fire without having flown. The TG-10 was a low-wing, single-engine jet with seating in tandem for the pilot and instructor. In general layout, it resembled the Northrop F-5 but had twin, outwardly-canted tail fins. Construction was of composite materials throughout. Announced to the public at the 1987 Paris Air Show, the key selling point of the design was its low cost, offering the performance of competing jet trainers at the cost of a turboprop trainer. Venga Aerospace claimed letters of interest from five countries, involving up to 160 aircraft. A single-seat ground-attack version and a UAV version were also considered.

Venga hoped to be able to enter the design in the USAF's JPATS competition, but this did not transpire. Finance proved an ongoing problem for the project, despite a partnership with Chinese firm Baosteel announced in 1994, as the first prototype was nearing completion. At the time, Venga still claimed "soft orders" for 86 aircraft from five customers. The aircraft was destroyed in a fire in May 1998, and no further work was undertaken. However, as recently as 2004, Venga hoped to relaunch the project.

== Specifications (prototype, as designed) ==
Data from Jane's All the World's Aircraft 1987–88, p.35

General characteristics

- Crew: Two, pilot and instructor
- Length: 11.89 m (39 ft 0 in)
- Wingspan: 8.23 m (27 ft 0 in)
- Height: 4.04 m (13 ft 3 in)
- Wing area: 12.5 m^{2} (135 sq ft)
- Aspect ratio: 5.4:1
- Empty weight: 1,288 kg (2,840 lb)
- Gross weight: 2,645 kg (5,831 lb)
- Powerplant: 1 × General Electric J85-GE-5 turbojet, 13.01 kN (2,920 lbf) thrust

Performance

- Maximum speed: 899 km/h (559 mph, 485 kn)
- Stall speed: 145 km/h (90 mph, 78 kn)
- Range: 1,760 km (1,090 mi, 950 nmi)
- Rate of climb: 36 m/s (7,000 ft/min)

Armament

- One centreline and four underwing pylons, each with capacity of 180 kg (400 lb)
