= Villiers V =

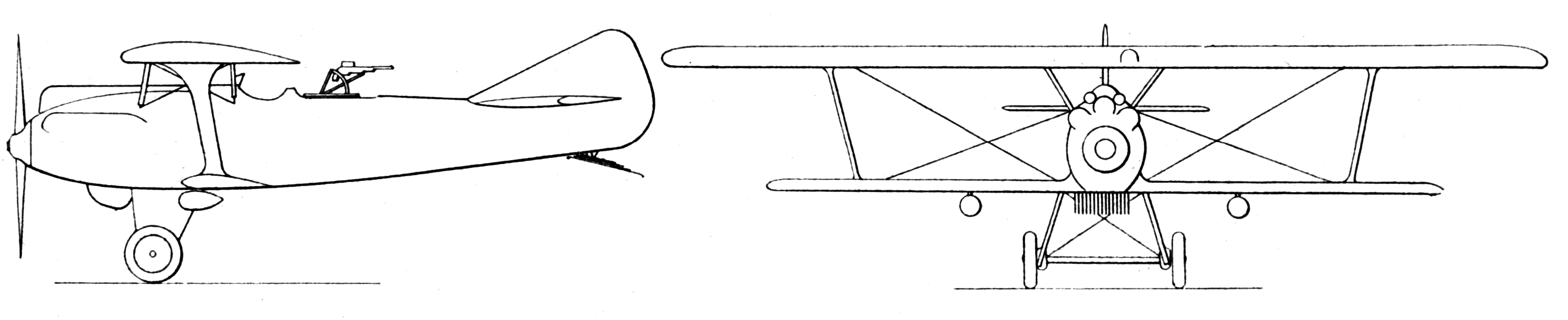
- Villiers V 2-view drawing from L'Aéronautique December,1926

General information
- Type: Night fighter
- National origin: France
- Manufacturer: Ateliers d'Aviation François Villiers
- Number built: 1

History
- First flight: 1926-7

The Villiers V, Villiers 5 or Villiers 5CN2 was a French night fighter built in the mid-1920s. It did not go into production.

== Design ==
The Villiers V made its first public appearance at the 1926 Paris Aero show, possibly before its first flight. As the military designation CN2 indicated, it was a two-seat chasseure de nuit or night fighter, designed and built to an Aviation Militaire specification. It was a sesquiplane with an upper to lower wing span ratio of about 1.4 and an area ratio of about 2.2 as the chord of the lower wing was also smaller. Apart from a centre section cut-out in the upper wing to enhance visibility from the cockpits and small root extensions on the lower wing, the two wings were strictly rectangular in plan and were wood framed and fabric covered. The Villiers V was a single bay biplane braced on each side by a single, faired duralumin interplane strut which leant outward to support the upper overhang and forward because of significant stagger. Four cabane struts supported the upper centre section close to the fuselage. Ailerons were fitted only on the upper wing.

The Villiers V's fuselage was a flat sided, plywood covered monocoque. Its engine was a 340 kW (450 hp) water cooled W-12 Lorraine-Dietrich 12Eb in a cowling which followed the outline of the three separate cylinder blocks. The pilot's open cockpit was ahead of the trailing edge, under the upper wing cut-out, with the gunner close behind. The pilot controlled a pair of fixed synchronised 7.7 mm (0.303 in) Vickers machine guns firing through the propeller disc and the gunner was provided with a pair of 7.7 mm (0.303 in) Lewis guns on a flexible mount.

The tail unit was conventional, with a broad chord, clipped triangular tailplane mounted on top of the fuselage and fitted with separate, round edged, balanced elevators. The triangular fin and its full, rounded unbalanced rudder were also broad, the rudder extending down to the keel and operated in a gap between the elevators. The night fighter had fixed conventional tailskid landing gear with mainwheels on a single axle sprung to a pair of V-struts from the lower fuselage, assisted by a long tailskid.

The night fighter was tested by the military under the designation Vil 5CN2 but was found not to provide enough improvement over existing equipment to justify production.

== Specifications ==
Data from Green and Swanborough (1994) p.582

General characteristics

- Crew: two
- Length: 8.75 m (28 ft 8 in)
- Upper wingspan: 12.00 m (39 ft 4 in)
- Height: 3.30 m (10 ft 10 in)
- Wing area: 40.0 m^{2} (431 sq ft)
- Empty weight: 1,274 kg (2,809 lb)
- Gross weight: 2,105 kg (4,641 lb)
- Fuel capacity: 480 L (110 imp gal; 130 US gal) in a tank that could be jettisoned in flight.
- Powerplant: 1 × Lorraine-Dietrich 12Eb water cooled W-12, 340 kW (450 hp)

Performance

- Maximum speed: 224 km/h (139 mph, 121 kn) at sea level, 210 km/h (130 mph) at 4,000 m (13,000 ft)
- Service ceiling: 7,000 m (23,000 ft) service
- Time to altitude: 43 min to 6,500 m (21,300 ft)

Armament

- 2× fixed synchronised 7.7 mm (0.303 in) Vickers machine guns firing through propeller disc
- 2× paired 7.7 mm (0.303 in) Lewis guns on flexible mount in rear cockpit
