= Vervoost FV-3 Delphin =

German ultralight airplane

FV-3 Delphin

General information
- Type: Research and Ultralight aircraft
- National origin: Germany
- Manufacturer: Vervoost Leichtflugzeuge
- Status: In production (2015)

History
- Introduction date: 2010
- First flight: 19 November 2009

The Vervoost FV-3 Delphin (English: Dolphin) is a German ultralight aircraft, designed and produced by Vervoost Leichtflugzeuge of Sinzig. It was first flown on 19 November 2009 and introduced at the AERO Friedrichshafen show in 2010. The aircraft is supplied as a complete ready-to-fly-aircraft.

== Design and development ==
The FV-3 was originally designed as a research aircraft, but is also offered as a commercial model that complies with the Fédération Aéronautique Internationale microlight rules. It features a cantilever low-wing, a two-seats-in-tandem enclosed cockpit under a bubble canopy, fixed conventional landing gear and a single engine in tractor configuration.

The aircraft fuselage is made from welded steel tubing, with the aft part covered in doped aircraft fabric and the forward part covered in carbon fibre panels. Its 9.36 m (30.7 ft) span wing is made from carbon fibre and has an area of 11.92 m^{2} (128.3 sq ft) and mounts large flaps. The wings are designed like glider wings and are easily removed, while the tailplane folds to allow ground transportation or storage. The standard engine available is the 100 hp (75 kW) Rotax 912ULS four-stroke powerplant.

== Variants ==
FV-3
Microlight version
FV-3F
Research version, with a second generator for flight instrumentation and equipment

== Specifications (FV-3 Delphin) ==
Data from Bayerland Tacke

General characteristics

- Crew: one
- Capacity: one passenger
- Wingspan: 9.36 m (30 ft 9 in)
- Wing area: 11.92 m^{2} (128.3 sq ft)
- Empty weight: 295 kg (650 lb)
- Gross weight: 472.5 kg (1,042 lb)
- Fuel capacity: 100 litres (22 imp gal; 26 US gal)
- Powerplant: 1 × Rotax 912ULS four cylinder, liquid and air-cooled, four stroke aircraft engine, 75 kW (101 hp)

Performance

- Maximum speed: 260 km/h (160 mph, 140 kn)
- Cruise speed: 200 km/h (120 mph, 110 kn)
- Stall speed: 65 km/h (40 mph, 35 kn)
- Rate of climb: 5.5 m/s (1,080 ft/min)
- Wing loading: 39.6 kg/m^{2} (8.1 lb/sq ft)
