= Vought Corsair Junior =

Military aircraft prototype

Corsair Junior

General information
- Type: Multi-purpose military two-seater
- National origin: United States
- Manufacturer: Vought
- Number built: 1

History
- First flight: late 1934-early 1935
- Developed from: Vought O2U

The Vought V-100 Corsair Junior was an attempt to produce a cheaper, multi-purpose, export version of the Vought O2U/O3U observation aircraft it had produced for the United States Navy. It was intended for sale to South American nations. First flown between late 1934 and early 1935, it did not sell and only the prototype was built.

== Design and development ==
From 1929 Vought had sold the Vought O2U Corsair observation aircraft to the U.S. Navy, followed by the similar O3U Corsair, and had also achieved some export sales. Countries with smaller resources found these both specialized and expensive and Vought hoped that a smaller, lighter, more versatile and cheaper version might be successful. The Corsair Junior was the result.

Like the earlier Corsairs, the Junior was a two seat biplane powered by a radial engine, a 400 hp (300 kW), nine-cylinder Pratt & Whitney Wasp Junior less powerful than engines of other Corsairs. It was a single bay biplane with N-form interplane struts; the lower wings were mounted on the lower fuselage longerons and the upper held over the fuselage on a short cabane. The unequal span wings had significant stagger and sweep. They had wooden structures, with spruce spars, and were fabric covered. There were ailerons on both upper and lower wings with rigid, external, vertical connections between them; the lower ailerons were operated directly by wires from the rudder bar.

Behind the engine, which had a short-chord cowling, the fuselage had a welded tube steel structure which included an easily removable fairing to allow access for servicing. There were two open cockpits in tandem, one over the center of the lower wing with a large cutout in the upper trailing edge for a greater field of view and the other just behind the lower trailing edge. The tail unit was conventional, with structure like that of the fuselage and fabric covered. The tailplane was mounted on top of the fuselage and the rudder, on a short fin, was balanced, rounded and full.

To allow multi-role operation, both cockpits were fitted with flying and engine controls and instrumentation, though brakes were only controllable from the forward cockpit. For instrument flight training this could be hooded and fitted with gyrocompass and artificial horizon. For other missions, such as observation, the rear controls could be removed to allow the use of a camera or radio or to provide a rear gunner's position with a Colt MG 42 machine gun on a novel flexible mount. A fixed, forward firing, pilot-operated gun, of calibres between 6.6–7.9 mm (0.26–0.31 in)) could be added, positioned to fire either through the propeller disk or over the upper wing. The Corsair Junior could also be used as a bomber, with bombs on a standard rack under the wing released from the forward cockpit.

To maximize its versatility, the Junior could be configured either as a land plane or floatplane. Its landing gear was fixed and conventional with wheels on a central fuselage-mounted split axle, their ends each supported by an oleo strut and a rearward drag strut. Its tailwheel was also on an oleo strut. The floatplane gear had a large, V-bottomed, single step float on vertical struts from the lower longerons, stabilized by a pair of small floats held higher on fore-and-aft pairs of inverted V-struts.

The date of the first flight is not known exactly but was between late 1934 and early 1935. Despite Vought's best efforts, the concept of a light military multi-purpose aircraft did not attract the interest in their chosen market area of South America that it had in Europe. Only the prototype was built.

== Specifications ==
Data from Aero Digest, March 1935 and Flying Magazine, June 1935.

General characteristics

- Crew: two
- Length: 26 ft 8 in (8.13 m)
- Upper wingspan: 35 ft 0 in (10.67 m)
- Lower wingspan: 34 ft 0 in (10.36 m)
- Empty weight: 2,405 lb (1,091 kg)
- Gross weight: 3,559 lb (1,614 kg)
- Fuel capacity: 88 US gal (73 imp gal; 330 L)
- Powerplant: 1 × Pratt & Whitney Wasp Junior SB 9 cylinder radial, 400 hp (300 kW) at 2,000 rpm and 5,000 ft (1,500 m)
- Propellers: 2-bladed Hamilton Standard

Performance

- Maximum speed: 155 mph (249 km/h, 135 kn) at 5,000 ft (1,500 m)}
- Landing speed: 54 mph (87 km/h; 47 kn)
- Range: 546 mi (879 km, 474 nmi)
- Service ceiling: 20,500 ft (6,200 m)
- Rate of climb: 1,030 ft/min (5.2 m/s)

== Bibliography ==
- Hagedorn, Dan (2019). "The Corsario Jr Legend: What Really Happened to the Sole Vought V-100?". The Aviation Historian (28): 32–39. ISSN 2051-1930.
