= Villiers VIII =

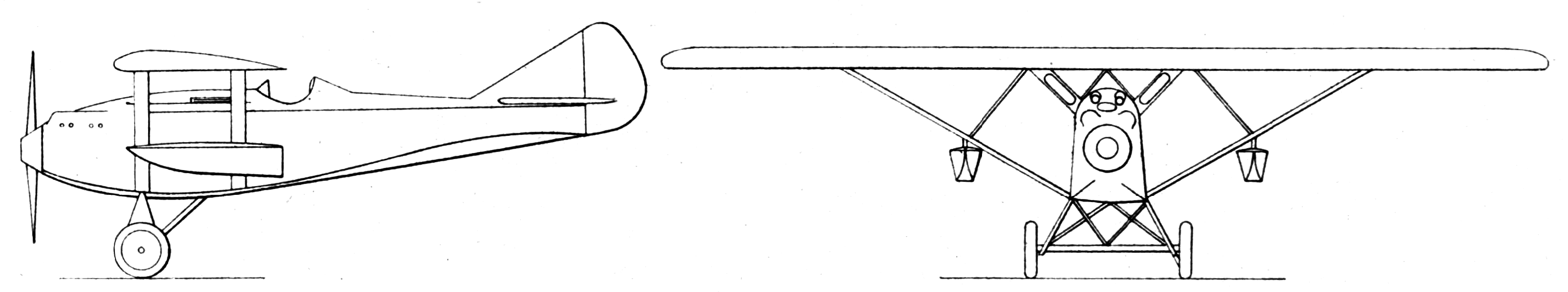
- Villiers VIII 2-view drawing from L'Aéronautique December,1926

General information
- Type: Single seat marine fighter
- National origin: France
- Manufacturer: Ateliers d'Aviation François Villiers

History
- First flight: 1926

The Villiers VIII or 8amC1 was a French shipboard fighter capable of alighting on water. After competitive tests, it did not receive a production order.

== Design ==
In 1924, Villiers had had some success with their Villiers II or Type 2amC2, a two-seat shipboard fighter with a boat-like fuselage underside which enabled it to put down on the sea in an emergency. The 1926 single seat Type 8amC1 had the same ability.

It had a rectangular plan, parasol wing braced from the lower fuselage with pairs of parallel struts on each side which met the wing at about two-thirds span. About halfway up these struts lighter jury struts ran to the edge of the wing centre section, meeting short cabane struts from the upper fuselage. The wing had a wooden structure with fabric covering and carried full span ailerons.

The Type VIII's fuselage also had a wooden structure but was plywood covered. It had an unstepped planing bottom and was divided into several watertight compartments to keep the aircraft afloat even with fuselage damage. In an emergency over water the land undercarriage was jettisoned and the aircraft stabilised by a planing float on each side, mounted on the wing struts at the lower end of the jury struts. The land wheels were on a single axle, sprung from the cross-member of a frame formed by longitudinal V-struts from the lower fuselage and a transverse V from the same points to the centre of the cross-member. The pilot's open cockpit was under a wing trailing edge cut-out and was provided with a small, streamlined head-rest. He controlled two fixed 7.7 mm (0.303 in) synchronised machine guns firing through the propeller disc.

Its tail unit was conventional, with a broad chord, clipped triangular tailplane mounted on top of the fuselage and fitted with separate, round edged, balanced elevators. The triangular fin and its full, rounded unbalanced rudder were also broad, the rudder extending down to the keel and operated in a gap between the elevators.

== Operational history ==
The exact date of the Type VIII's first flight is not known but it was evaluated in military trials late in 1926 at Saint-Raphaël as the Vil 8amC1. The military preferred its competitor, the Lévy-Biche LB 2amC1, and development of the Type VIII ended.

== Specifications ==
Data from Green and Swanborough (1994) p.582

General characteristics

- Crew: one
- Length: 8.39 m (27 ft 6 in)
- Wingspan: 11.72 m (38 ft 5 in)
- Height: 2.78 m (9 ft 1 in)
- Wing area: 27.8 m^{2} (299 sq ft)
- Empty weight: 1,115 kg (2,458 lb)
- Gross weight: 1,550 kg (3,417 lb)
- Powerplant: 1 × Hispano-Suiza 8Fb water cooled V-8, 220 kW (300 hp)
- Propellers: 2-bladed

Performance

- Maximum speed: 210 km/h (130 mph, 110 kn) at sea level, 184 km/h (114 mph) at 4,500 m (14,800 ft)
- Time to altitude: 49 min to 6,000 m (20,000 ft)

Armament

- 2× 7.7 mm (0.303 in) synchronised machine guns firing through propeller disc
