= Vickers Boxkite =

Type of aircraft

The Vickers Boxkite refers to three aircraft built by Hewlett & Blondeau and a single similar aircraft actually built by Vickers was created by Vickers Aviation. Originally, Vickers used their own monoplanes at their flying school at Brooklands. In late 1912 the school bought three Farman-type aircraft from Hewlett & Blondeau, who also had a flying school at Brooklands. These three aircraft were modified to become the Vickers Boxkite. The Vickers constructors numbers given to these aircraft were No. 19, 20, and 21.

The first two aircraft were powered by a 50 hp Gnome engine while the third was powered by a 70 hp Gnome engine. Two of the aircraft were eventually taken by the Royal Flying Corps.

In 1913, Vickers built a version of these aircraft with equal-span wings and a rudimentary nacelle. It was initially powered by a Vickers-Boucier 50 hp engine, later replaced with a 70 hp Gnome engine.
