= Viberti Musca 1 =

General information
- Type: Two-seat touring monoplane
- National origin: Italy
- Manufacturer: Ali Viberti SpA
- Designer: Franco Muscariello

History
- First flight: 1948

The Viberti Musca 1 is a 1940s Italian two-seat civil touring monoplane produced by Ali Verberti SpA of Turin.

The Musca 1 was a cantilever low-wing monoplane powered by an 85 hp (63 kW) Continental C85 flat-four piston engine. Named for the chief designer Franco Muscariello it had an enclosed side-by-side seating and a fixed conventional landing gear. The Musca 1 started production in 1948 and in 1951 the Musca 1bis was introduced with structural improvements. The company had two further variants planned but the company was dissolved around 1951. Muscareillo continued development of the Musca 1, however, flying a modified version, the Musca 1 Ter powered by a Walter Micron on 15 September 1952.

== Variants ==
Musca 1
Initial production variant.
Musca 1bis
Structural improvements.
Musca 1 Ter
Modified undercarriage and 75 horsepower (56 kW) Walter Micron III engine.
Musca 2
Three-seat cabin monoplane, not built.
Musca 4
A high-wing development of the Musca 1, not built.

== Specifications ==
Data from Jane's All The World's Aircraft 1951–52.

General characteristics

- Crew: 2
- Length: 6.65 m (21 ft 10 in)
- Wingspan: 9.50 m (31 ft 2 in)
- Empty weight: 580 kg (1,279 lb)
- Powerplant: 1 × Continental C85 four-cylinder air-cooled horizontally-opposed engine, 63 kW (85 hp)

Performance

- Maximum speed: 178 km/h (111 mph, 96 kn) at 1,800 m (5,900 ft)
- Cruise speed: 130 km/h (81 mph, 70 kn)
- Stall speed: 60 km/h (37 mph, 32 kn)
