= Veleria Dedalo Strike-T =

Italian ultralight trike

Strike-T

General information
- Type: Ultralight trike
- National origin: Italy
- Manufacturer: Veleria Dedalo
- Status: In production (2018)

The Veleria Dedalo Strike-T is an Italian ultralight trike, designed and produced by Veleria Dedalo of Gradara. The aircraft is supplied complete and ready-to-fly.

== Design and development ==
The Strike-T is a minimalist trike, designed for engine-off soaring. It was designed to comply with the German 120 kg class and the US FAR 103 Ultralight Vehicles rules, including the category's maximum empty weight of 254 lb (115 kg).

The aircraft design features a cable-braced hang glider-style high-wing, weight-shift controls, a single-seat open cockpit without a cockpit fairing, tricycle landing gear and a single engine in pusher configuration.

The aircraft is made predominantly from titanium tubing, with the landing gear legs from Ergal. Its double surface wing is covered in Dacron sailcloth, supported by a single tube-type kingpost and uses an "A" frame weight-shift control bar. The nosewheel is fitted with a drum brake. The powerplant is a single cylinder, air-cooled, two-stroke, single-ignition 27 hp (20 kW) Cisco C-Max engine.

The aircraft, without the wing fitted, has an empty weight of 25 kg (55 lb). Designed to fold for ground transport by automobile, it can be rigged for flight in 3 minutes.

A number of different wings can be fitted to the basic carriage, including the A-I-R Atos rigid wing.

== Variants ==
Strike-T
Model made from titanium tubing.
Strike-S
Model made from stainless steel tubing. It is 3.5 kg (8 lb) heavier, but significantly cheaper.

== Specifications (Strike-T) ==
Data from Tacke

General characteristics

- Crew: one
- Empty weight: 29 kg (64 lb)
- Fuel capacity: 15 litres (3.3 imp gal; 4.0 US gal)
- Powerplant: 1 × Cisco C-Max single cylinder, air-cooled, two stroke aircraft engine, 20 kW (27 hp)
- Propellers: 2-bladed wooden, fixed pitch, 1.4 m (4 ft 7 in) diameter
