= Venture Light Aircraft =

Aircraft manufacturer in Pima County, Arizona

Venture Light Aircraft LLC
- Industry: Aerospace
- Headquarters: Tucson, Arizona, United States

Venture Light Aircraft LLC is a US aircraft manufacturer based in Tucson, Arizona. It markets the Thorp T-211 in kitplane form.
