= Voisin XII =

French WW1 bomber aircraft

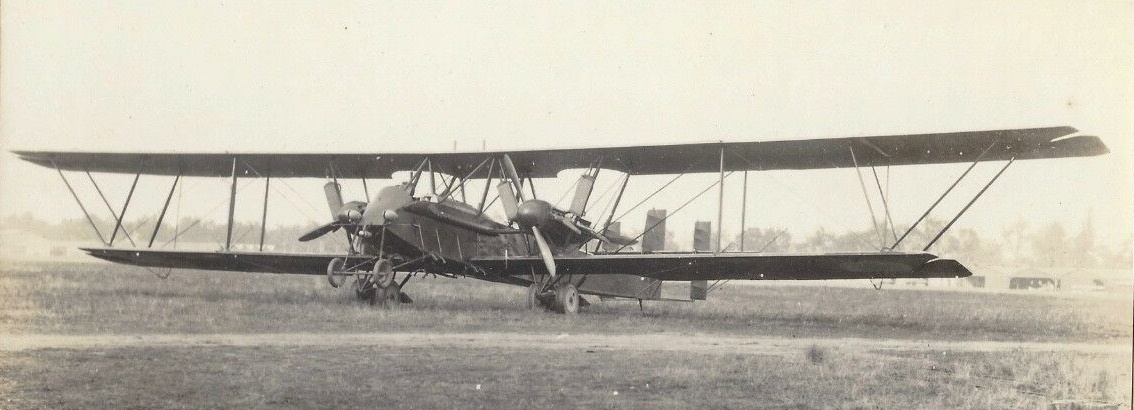
- Voisin XII

General information
- Type: Night Bomber
- National origin: France
- Manufacturer: Voisin
- Designer: Gabriel Voisin
- Number built: 1

History
- First flight: 1918

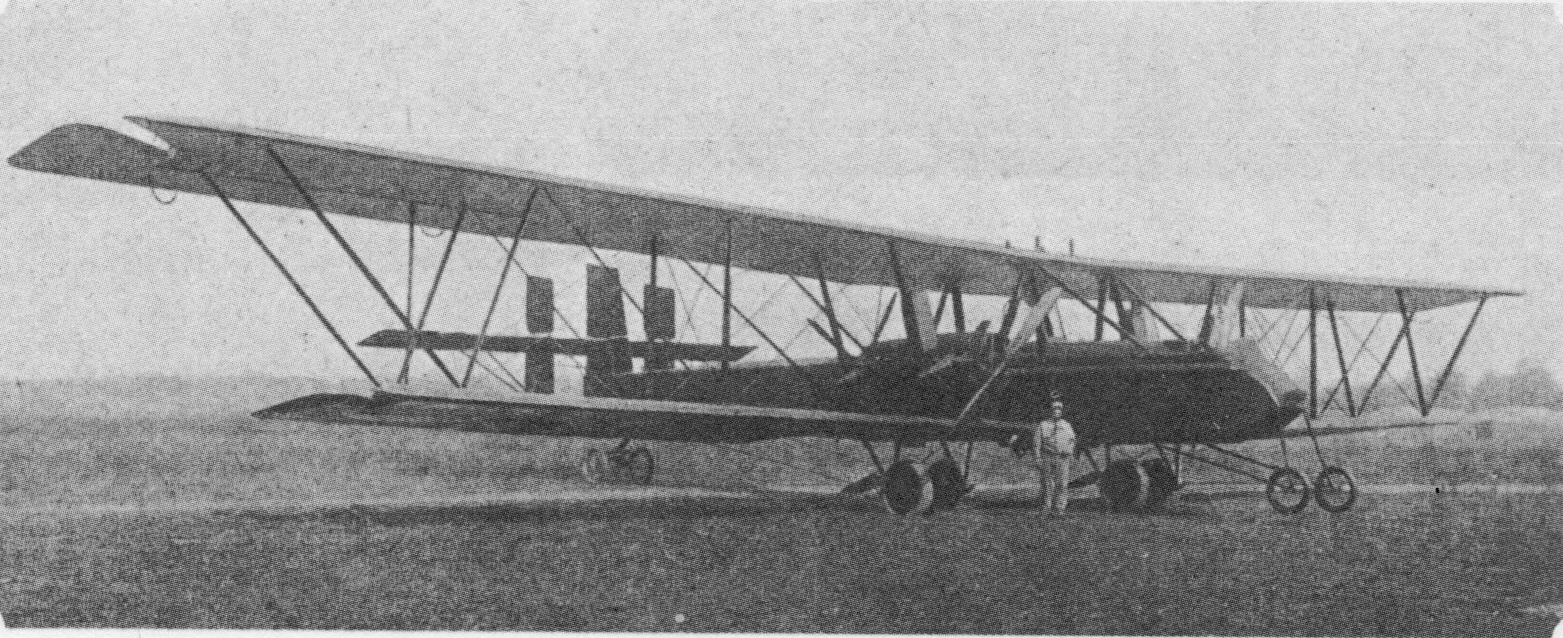
Voisin Bn.2

The Voisin XII was a prototype French two-seat four-engine biplane bomber built near the end of the First World War but which did not enter service.

== Development ==
The Voisin XII was a long-range night bomber with four Hispano-Suiza 8Bc engines mounted in pairs in tandem. The aircraft was built in response to the BN2 requirement for a long-range night bomber. One prototype was built and test flights were successful, but the war's end precluded the Voisin XII from being ordered into production.

The Voison XIII night-bomber or Type E.87-2 was a proposed development of the Voisin XII, it was not built.

== Specifications (Voisin XII Bn.2) ==
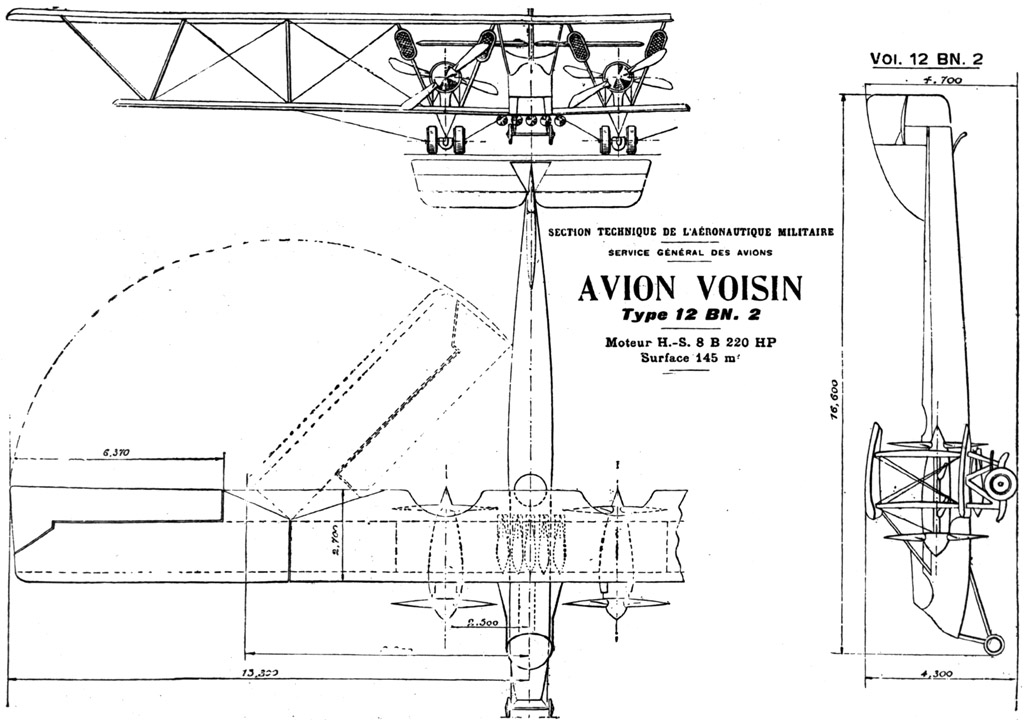
Voisin 12Bn.2 drawing

Data from French Aircraft of the First World War

General characteristics

- Crew: 2
- Length: 17.30 m (56 ft 9 in)
- Wingspan: 30.00 m (98 ft 5 in)
- Height: 4.91 m (16 ft 1 in)
- Wing area: 155.68 m^{2} (1,675.7 sq ft)
- Empty weight: 3,500 kg (7,716 lb)
- Max takeoff weight: 5,700 kg (12,566 lb)
- Powerplant: 4 × Hispano-Suiza 8Bc V-8 water-cooled piston engines in tandem tractor/pusher nacelles, 160 kW (220 hp) each
- Propellers: 2-bladed Voisin fixed-pitch tractor/pusher propellers

Performance

- Maximum speed: 145 km/h (90 mph, 78 kn) at 2,000 m (6,600 ft)
- Range: 700 km (430 mi, 380 nmi)
- Endurance: 5 hours
- Time to altitude: 20 minutes to 2,000 m (6,600 ft)

Armament

- Guns: one 7.7 mm (0.303 in) Lewis gun, with the option for one 37 mm (1.457 in) Hotchkiss cannon
- Bombs: 800 kg (1,800 lb) of bombs.

== See also ==
Related lists

- List of bomber aircraft
- List of military aircraft of France
- List of military aircraft of the Entente Powers in World War I
