= Villiers 26 =

General information
- Type: Patrol and escort seaplane
- National origin: France
- Manufacturer: Ateliers d'Aviation François Villiers
- Number built: 1

History
- First flight: shortly before April 1930

The Villiers 26 was a French naval seaplane which used Handley Page slats to provide the wide speed range required for escort and patrol duties. It was tested, behaved satisfactorily but received no production order.

== Design ==
The 1928 Villiers XXIV nightfighter was the first French aircraft to use Handley Page slats and Viliers used them again in a slightly different way on their Type 26. They provided the low speeds required for efficient ship escort work as well as high speeds for patrols, as well as almost halving the takeoff time.

Apart from a narrowed centre-section, the wings were strictly rectangular in plan, with a chord of 3.20 m (10 ft 6 in). Mounted on the lower fuselage with about 4° of dihedral, they were built around two box spars with spruce ribs and fabric covered. Each wing was braced from the floats by converging pairs of duralumin tubular struts to the spars at a little beyond mid-span. The leading and trailing edges of both wings were filled by duralumin-covered control surfaces, divided into two matching sections. On the outer wing, the ailerons had slats which were opened automatically by aerodynamic forces when the angle of incidence exceeded 8°; the inner flaps and slats were controlled together from a single wheel in the cockpit.

The Villiers 26's flat sided fuselage was built around four spruce longerons and plywood covered. It was powered by a 310 kW (420 hp) Gnome & Rhône 9A nine-cylinder radial engine, a licence-built Bristol Jupiter, mounted on a duralumin frame in the nose. Behind it, beyond a firewall, there were tanks for oil and, in the wing roots, petrol. Most of the four man crew were enclosed in a low cabin, with a windscreen just ahead of the wing leading edge. There were two pilot's seats, fitted with dual controls and behind them positions for the navigator and the radio operator. The gunner had an open cockpit behind the cabin, fitted with twin 7.7 mm (0.303 in) Lewis guns on a flexible mount. At the rear the wood-framed, fabric-covered empennage was very angular, with a broad, triangular fin and a rectangular balanced rudder, its aerodynamic balance unusually beneath the fuselage. The tailplane, which was supported from below by inverted V-struts on each side, was straight-edged, small, and could be adjusted in flight. A rectangular, notched elevator was fitted with trim tabs.

Its single-step floats each had a capacity of 2.5 m^{3} (88 cu ft) and were spaced 4.2 m (13 ft 9 in) apart, joined by transverse tubes at the front and rear. These were joined to the lower fuselage by inward leaning, transverse inverted W-struts.

The Villiers 26 underwent completion at Berre-l'Étang and was complete and ready for tests before February 1930 By April it had flown, showing good characteristics on water and in the air. With the slats open, it took off at 55 km/h (34 mph) in six seconds and could be flown at angles of attack up to 27° without loss on control. Nonetheless, there are no further reports of it in the French press and the following year Villiers went out of business.

== Specifications ==
Data from Les Ailes (1930)

General characteristics

- Crew: four
- Length: 12.92 m (42 ft 5 in)
- Wingspan: 21.92 m (71 ft 11 in)
- Height: 4.78 m (15 ft 8 in)
- Wing area: 66 m^{2} (710 sq ft)
- Airfoil: Villiers A.6
- Empty weight: 1,820 kg (4,012 lb)
- Gross weight: 2,800 kg (6,173 lb)
- Fuel capacity: 480 kg (1,060 lb)
- Powerplant: 1 × Gnome & Rhône 9A 9-cylinder radial, 310 kW (420 hp) 420 CV (licence-built Bristol Jupiter)
- Propellers: 2-bladed

Performance

- Maximum speed: 175 km/h (109 mph, 94 kn)
- Cruise speed: 60 km/h (37 mph, 32 kn) , for maximum endurance on escort duty
- Range: 850 km (530 mi, 460 nmi) slats closed
- Endurance: 9 hr at cruising speed
- Service ceiling: 6,000 m (20,000 ft)
- Alighting speed: 55 km/h (34 mph)
- Performance figures were calculated by Villiers.

Armament

- Guns: 2×7.7 mm (0.303 in) Lewis guns on flexible mount in rear cockpit
- Bombs: 2×50 kg (110 lb) bombs

== Bibliography ==
- Ropolo, Pierre (July 1972). "Le Villiers 26". Le Album de Fanatique de l'Aviation (in French) (35): 18–20. ISSN 0757-4169.
