= Vought VE-10 =

American prototype flying boat

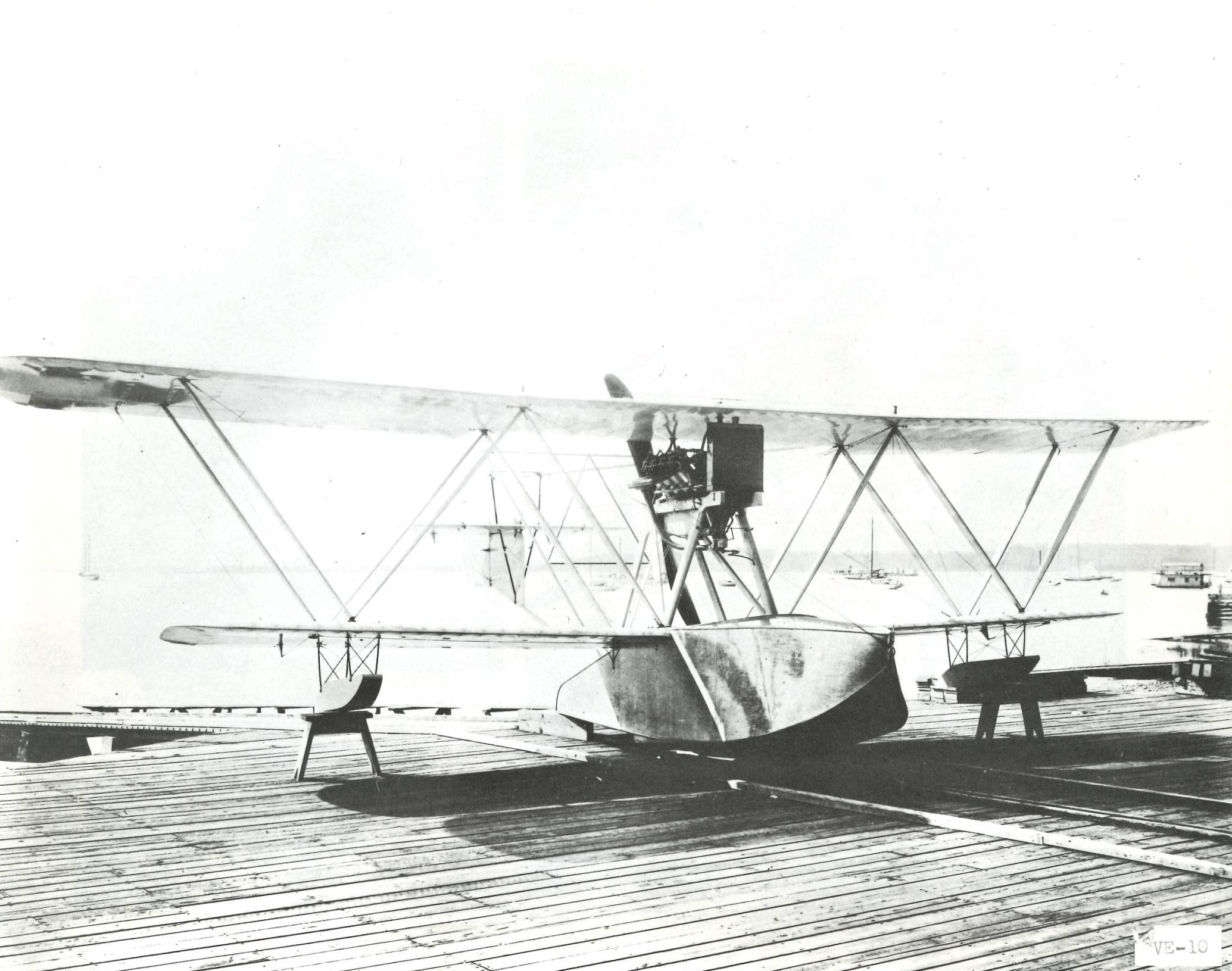
- Vought VE-10

General information
- Type: Flying boat
- National origin: United States
- Manufacturer: Vought
- Status: Discontinued
- Number built: 1

History
- Manufactured: 1919
- Introduction date: 1919
- First flight: August 2, 1919

The Vought VE-10 "Bat Boat" was an American biplane flying boat built in 1919 by Vought.

== Design and development ==
Chance M. Vought announced the VE-10 at around the same time as work began on the VE-9. The aircraft had a short, 3-seat hull and was powered by a 90 hp Curtiss OX-5 V8 engine.

== Operational history ==
The VE-10 made its maiden flight on August 2, 1919, with test pilots James A. Taylor, Jr. and Caleb S. Bragg at the controls. Pilots of the aircraft noted that it was well balanced, easy to control, and had performance similar to many land planes of the time. They also noted that it may have been able to perform stunts; an act that was rare for seaplanes at the time. The September 13, 1919 issue of Aircraft Journal called it "one of the most promising commercial airplanes to make its appearance since the armistice". Despite the large public interest for the VE-10, Vought failed to sell any aircraft.

Vought offered the VE-10 to the US Navy, and "exhaustive" test flights were made by US Naval Air Service Commanders McDonald and Griffin, and US Army Lieutenant Colonel Harald E. Hartney. All three test pilots were pleased with the VE-10's flight characteristics, but as the Navy did not have a use for the aircraft other than unofficial flights, no orders were placed. The final disposition of the VE-10 is unknown.

== Variants ==
VE-10
1 built

VE-15
Militarized derivative of the VE-10. Not built.

== Specifications (VE-10) ==
Data from

General characteristics

- Crew: 1
- Capacity: 2 passengers
- Length: 27 ft 0 in (8.23 m)
- Upper wingspan: 36 ft 0 in (10.97 m)
- Lower wingspan: 28 ft 4.5 in (8.649 m)
- Height: 10 ft 5 in (3.18 m)
- Wing area: 300 sq ft (28 m^{2})
- Empty weight: 1,330 lb (603 kg)
- Max takeoff weight: 1,950 lb (885 kg)
- Powerplant: 1 × Curtiss OX-5 V8 engine, 90 hp (67 kW)
- Propellers: 2-bladed wooden propeller

Performance

- Maximum speed: 80 mph (130 km/h, 70 kn)
- Stall speed: 46 mph (74 km/h, 40 kn)
- Endurance: 2½ hr
- Rate of climb: 325 ft/min (1.65 m/s)

== See also ==
Aircraft of comparable role, configuration, and era

- Grigorovich M-1
- Lohner L
- Norman Thompson N.T.2B

Related lists

- List of flying boats and floatplanes
