= Vickers F.B.16 =

British single-seat fighter aircraft

F.B.16
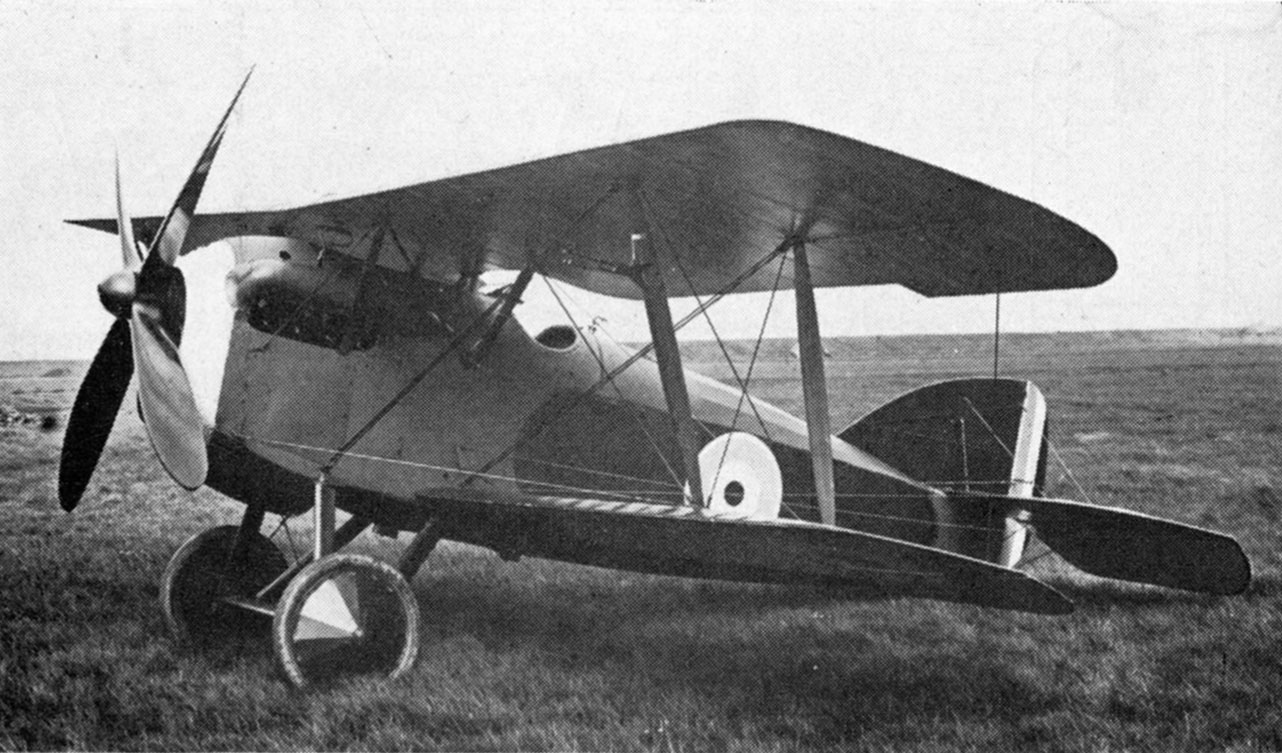
- Vickers F.B.16D

General information
- Type: Fighter aircraft
- National origin: United Kingdom
- Manufacturer: Vickers
- Designer: Rex Pierson

History
- First flight: 1916

The Vickers F.B.16 was a British single-seat fighter aircraft of the First World War. It was originally designed to be powered by an experimental radial engine, development of which was abandoned. When re-engined with more powerful and reliable water-cooled V-8 engines, the F.B.16 demonstrated good performance, but only a few prototypes were built, the type not entering service.

== Design and development ==
In 1914, following the outbreak of the First World War, the British engineering company, Vickers Limited, entered into an agreement with the Hart Engine Company of Leeds to fund development of an air-cooled radial engine, planned to generate 150 hp (112 kW). Vickers planned several aircraft around the promising new engine, including a tractor configuration single-seat fighter designed by Rex Pierson, the F.B.16. Pierson's new fighter, also known as the Hart Scout, was a single-bay biplane with heavily staggered wings of unequal span. It had a volumous, elliptical section fuselage, with the pilot sitting in an open cockpit above the lower wing and the Hart engine enclosed in a cowling. Armament was a single synchronised Vickers machine gun.

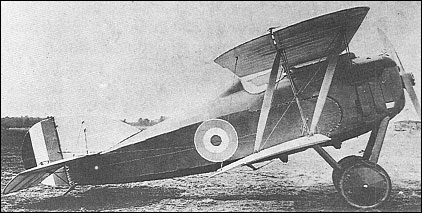
Side view

The prototype FB.16 made its maiden flight during 1916, but testing showed that the pilot had a poor view, and the engine was prone to overheating. The aircraft was modified by removing the cowling to improve cooling and cutting down the fuselage behind the cockpit to improve the rearwards view. The problems with the Hart engine continued, however, and development of the radial was soon stopped.

The F.B.16 was redesigned to use the water-cooled Hispano-Suiza 8 V-8 engine, rated at the same power as the Hart, with the new engine allowing a narrower fuselage. The revised aircraft (which may have been a rebuild of the Hart-powered prototype), designated F.B.16A emerged late in 1916 but was destroyed in a crash on 20 December that year. A second prototype, serial number A8963 was completed in January 1917, being tested at Martlesham Heath in April. Although a maximum speed of 120 mph (193 km/h) was demonstrated, no orders followed, the Royal Aircraft Factory S.E.5, easier to maintain and already in production, being preferred.

A8963 was rebuilt with a 200 hp (149 kW) Hispano-Suiza engine, and modified wings as the F.B.16D, emerging in this form in June 1917. It was armed with a single Lewis gun mounted between the cylinder banks of the engine and firing through a hollow propeller shaft, while a second Lewis gun was mounted on a sliding mount above the upper wing. Performance was once again good, impressing the fighter pilot and air ace James McCudden, who recorded reaching a speed of 136 mph (219 km/h), stating "Whilst flying this machine I got some idea of the speed of future machines, for at 10,000 ft it was 30 mph faster than anything I had yet flown." Officials were less impressed with the FB.16D, however, it being criticised for structural problems and maintenance access, being described as "not considered suitable in its present form for active service".

Vickers again redesigned the F.B.16, fitting it with two-bay wings of longer (31 foot (9.45 m)) span and a 275 hp (205 kW) Lorraine-Dietrich 8 Bd engine as the FB.16E. Armament was a more conventional two Vickers machine guns. It was hoped to sell the revised fighter to the French Aéronautique Militaire, it being allocated the French official designation Vic.16.C1, but no orders followed, the FB.16E being destroyed in a crash on 29 July 1918. A final version was the F.B.16H, which replaced the Lorrane-Dietrich with a 300 hp (224 kW) Hispano-Suiza, a speed of 147 mph (237 km/h) being claimed, but yet again, no production followed.

== Specifications (F.B.16D) ==
Data from War Planes of the First World War:Volume Three Fighters

General characteristics

- Crew: one
- Length: 19 ft 6 in (5.94 m)
- Upper wingspan: 25 ft (7.6 m)
- Lower wingspan: 22 ft 4 in (6.81 m)
- Height: 8 ft 9 in (2.67 m)
- Wing area: 207 sq ft (19.2 m^{2})
- Empty weight: 1,376 lb (624 kg)
- Gross weight: 1,875 lb (850 kg)
- Powerplant: 1 × Hispano-Suiza 8 water-cooled V-8 engine, 200 hp (150 kW)

Performance

- Maximum speed: 135 mph (217 km/h, 117 kn) at 10,000 ft (3,050 m)
- Endurance: 2¼ hours
- Service ceiling: 18,500 ft (5,600 m)
- Time to altitude:
  - 10 min 25 sec to 10,000 ft (3,050 m)
  - 20 min 45 sec to 15,000 ft (4,670 m)

Armament

- Guns: 2× .303 British (7.7 mm) Lewis guns (one firing through propeller shaft, one above upper wing)

== See also ==
Aircraft of comparable role, configuration, and era

- Royal Aircraft Factory S.E.5
- SPAD S.XIII
- Sopwith Dolphin
- Martinsyde Buzzard
