= Villiers XXIV =

French night fighter prototype

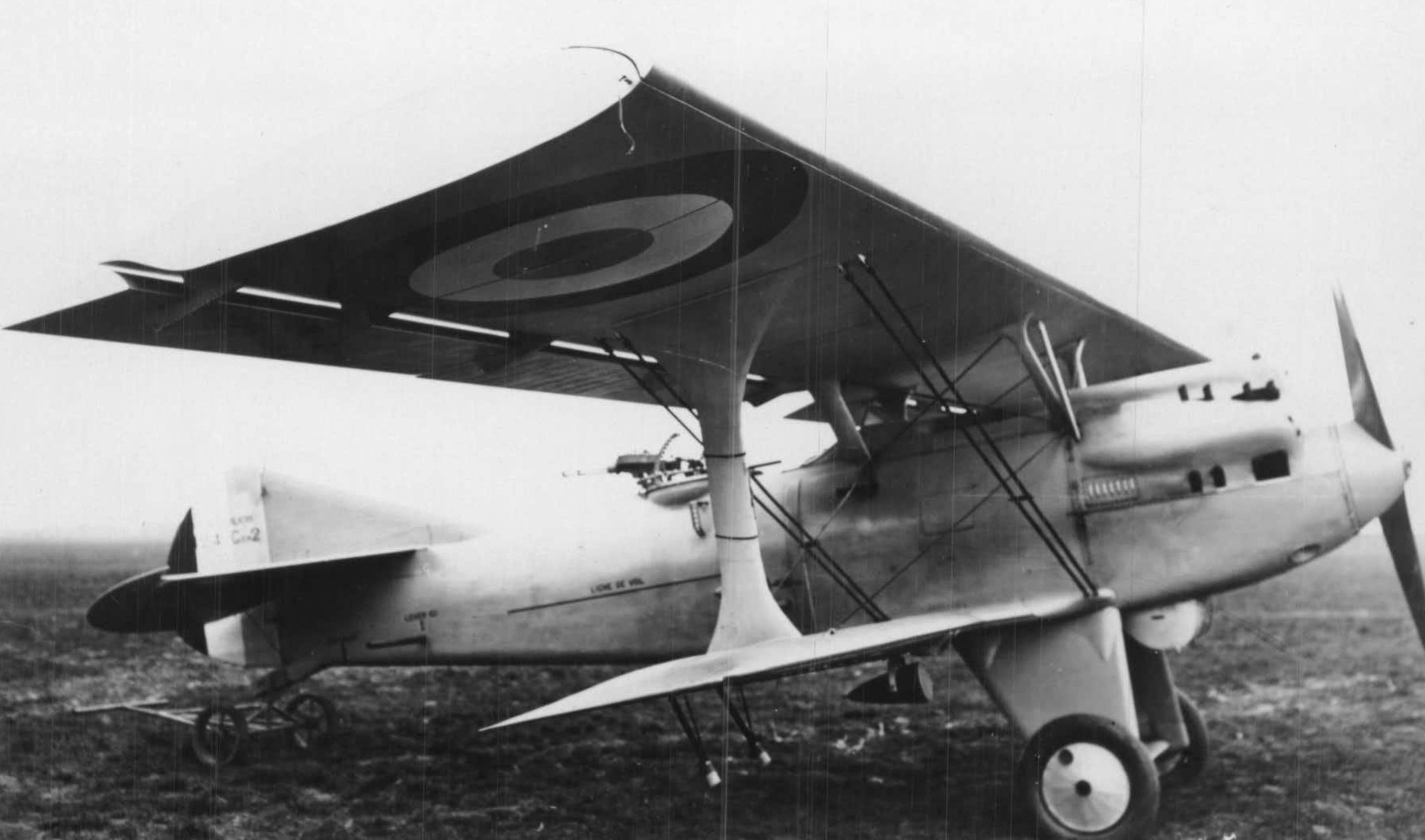

General information
- Type: night fighter
- National origin: France
- Manufacturer: Ateliers d'Aviation François Villiers
- Number built: 1

History
- First flight: March 1928

The Villiers XXIV or Villiers 24 CAN2 was a French army night fighter most notable as the first French military aircraft to be fitted with leading edge slats.

== Design ==
Though the ability of retractable leading edge slots to enable wings to reach high angles of attack without stalling and hence allow low flying speeds without a high speed drag penalty was discussed at the 1921 Paris Salon by Frederick Handley Page, slats were not used by French military aircraft before the 1928 Villiers XXIV. This night fighter (its military CAN2 designation stood for chasse, armée, nuit or army night fighter) used a combination of slats and flaps, together with ailerons which could be lowered together as well as conventionally operated differentially. Flight tests showed that with the slats open at maximum flap angles the minimum flight speed decreased by 30%.

The Villiers XXIV was a single bay sesquiplane with an upper wingspan 1.4 times that of the lower and about twice as broad. Their sections were different, with R.A.F.31 airfoil on the upper wings and Göttingen 436 on the lower. In plan both wings were strictly rectangular and fabric covered but they had different structures, the upper with wooden box spars and the lower with aluminium spars. They were braced together by a single interplane strut on each side; these had airfoil sections and widened considerably at the foot and more so at the top. The centre section of the upper wing was braced to the upper fuselage with four outward-leaning cabane struts.

Only the upper wing carried control surfaces, with a single leading edge slat over the whole span. Apart from a small centre section with a large cut-out to improve the visibility from the pilot's cockpit, the whole of the trailing edge was filled by flaps inboard and ailerons outboard. When the slats were opened by the pilot, ailerons and flaps were depressed but retained their normal functions with unchanged angular defection ranges.

The Villier XXIV's fuselage was built around six longerons, positioned by glued formers, and plywood covered behind the nose where its 340 kW (450 hp) Lorraine 12Eb Courlis water-cooled W-12 engine was under an aluminium cowling which followed the outlines of the three cylinder banks. The engine was cooled by a retractable, ventral Lamblin radiator between the undercarriage legs. There was a second open cockpit for the gunner, equipped with a pair of machine guns on a flexible mounting. The pilot controlled a pair of fixed, forward firing synchronised 7.7 mm (0.303 in) guns.

The tail unit was conventional, with a broad chord, clipped triangular tailplane, mounted on top of the fuselage at an angle which could be adjusted in flight and fitted with separate, round edged, balanced elevators. The triangular fin and its full, rounded unbalanced rudder were also broad. Both fin and rudder were ply skinned and their control surfaces fabric covered. The rudder extended down to the keel and operated in a gap between the elevators. The night fighter had fixed conventional tailskid landing gear with mainwheels on a single 2 m (6 ft 7 in) track axle sprung to a pair of faired-in V-struts from the lower fuselage, assisted by a steel sprung tailskid.

== Development ==
The Villiers XXIV first flew in March 1928 and was soon undergoing tests at the military testing ground at Villacoublay, flown by Descamps. The slats were particularly closely examined. Fully loaded, the lowest flying speed was 101 km/h (63 mph) with slats shut, reduced to 70 km/h (43 mph) with them open. A planned second machine was intended to have automatic, aerodynamically opened slats in place of the pilot operated ones on the first prototype. However, the CAN2 programme was dropped by the air force and development of the Villiers XXIV abandoned, so this second prototype was never built.

== Specifications ==
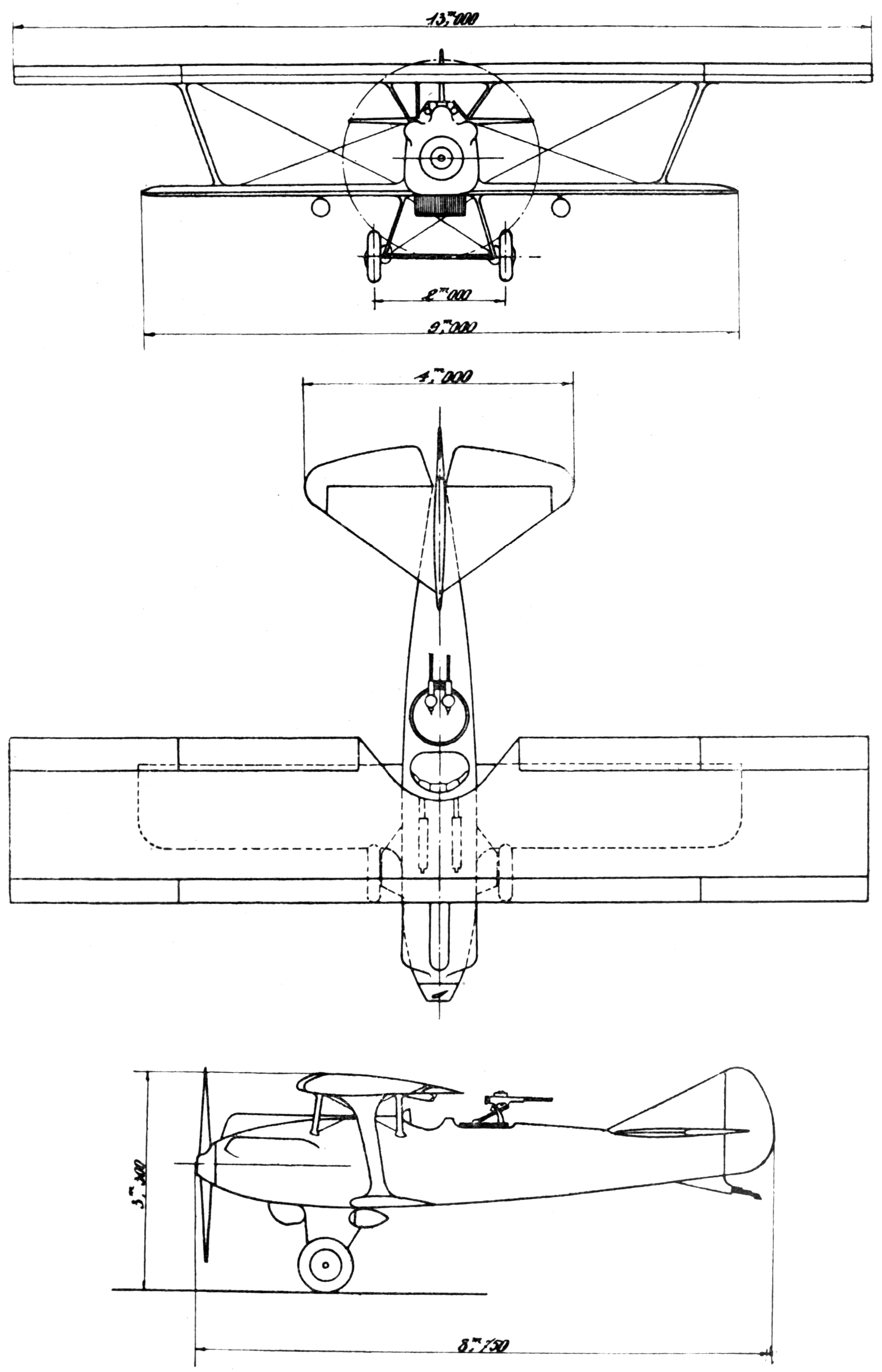
Villiers XXIV C.2 3-view drawing from L'Air June 1, 1928

Data from NACA (November 1928) unless indicated otherwise

General characteristics

- Crew: two
- Length: 8.75 m (28 ft 8 in)
- Upper wingspan: 13 m (42 ft 8 in)
- Lower wingspan: 9.00 m (29 ft 6 in)
- Height: 3.30 m (10 ft 10 in)
- Wing area: 42 m^{2} (450 sq ft)
- Airfoil: upper wing R.A.F.31, lower wing Göttingen 436
- Empty weight: 1,469 kg (3,239 lb)
- Gross weight: 2,219 kg (4,892 lb)
- Fuel capacity: 300 kg (660 lb)
- Powerplant: 1 × Lorraine 12Eb Courlis water-cooled W-12 engine, 340 kW (450 hp)
- Propellers: 2-bladed

Performance

- Maximum speed: 212 km/h (132 mph, 114 kn) at sea level; 200 km/h (120 mph; 110 kn) at 5,000 m (16,000 ft)
- Minimum control speed: 70 km/h (43 mph, 38 kn) with slots open, 101 km/h (63 mph; 55 kn) slots closed
- Endurance: 3 hrs with normal tankage; provision for an extra tank to add 1 hr
- Time to altitude: 50 min to 6,000 m (20,000 ft)

Armament

- Guns: * 2x fixed forward firing 7.7 mm (0.303 in) Vickers machine guns

and

- 2x 7.7 mm (0.303 in) Lewis machine guns on a flexible mount in the rear cockpit
