= Vickers F.B.12 =

F.B.12
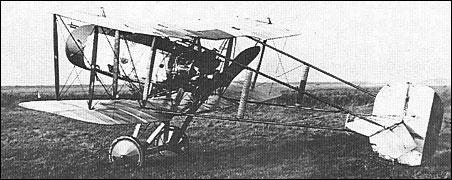

General information
- Type: Fighter
- National origin: United Kingdom
- Manufacturer: Vickers Limited
- Number built: ~22

History
- First flight: July 1916

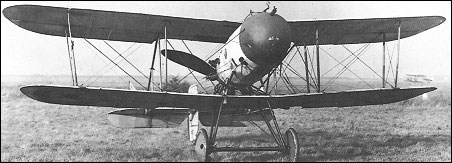
Front view

The Vickers F.B.12 was a biplane pusher fighter aircraft developed during World War I by Vickers Limited. The failure of the engine for which it was designed, and the obsolescence of the pusher configuration, resulted in its remaining an experimental type only.

== Development and design ==
At the start of the First World War, Vickers entered into a partnership with the Hart Engine Company to develop a 150 hp (110 kW) nine-cylinder radial engine designed by Hart. This engine was planned to power a number of new designs by Vickers, the first of which was a small single-engine pusher biplane fighter, the F.B.12.

The F.B.12 shared the obsolescent pusher layout of the D.H.2 and F.E.8, although the raised nacelle vastly improved the rear view from the cockpit. The wings were of wood and fabric construction, with rounded tips. The circular nacelle was framed in steel tubing, with the engine directly behind the cockpit, driving a wooden propeller. The tail was at the end of a structure of steel booms. A .303 in (7.7 mm) machine gun was placed inside the front of the nacelle, with only the barrel protruding.

The first FB.12 flew in June 1916, powered by an 80 hp (60 kW) Le Rhône rotary engine as the Hart was not yet available. With this engine, it proved to be underpowered and was re-fitted with a 100 hp (75 kW) Gnome Monosoupape engine. It was then rebuilt with increased wing span and area, becoming the F.B.12A. In December 1916 it was sent to France for operational testing, where it was deemed as good as the D.H.2 and F.E.8, a rather back-handed recommendation as both these types were by now well outclassed by the latest German fighters, the Albatros D.Is and D.IIs.

The F.B.12B was similar to the F.B.12A, but fitted with the originally intended Hart engine, flying early in 1917. In November 1916, meanwhile, the War Office placed an order for 50 Hart-powered aircraft, designated the F.B.12C for the RFC. The F.B.12B crashed during tests in early 1917, leading to Vickers abandoning the Hart. Only 18 of the order were built, being fitted with a number of different engines including a 110 hp (80 kW) Le Rhône and a 100 hp (75 kW) Anzani radial. Tested between May and July 1917, only one F.B.12C was delivered, to a Home Defence unit.

The F.B.12D was the final variation, only one prototype was produced with a larger 110 hp (80 kW) Le Rhone engine.

== Gallery ==
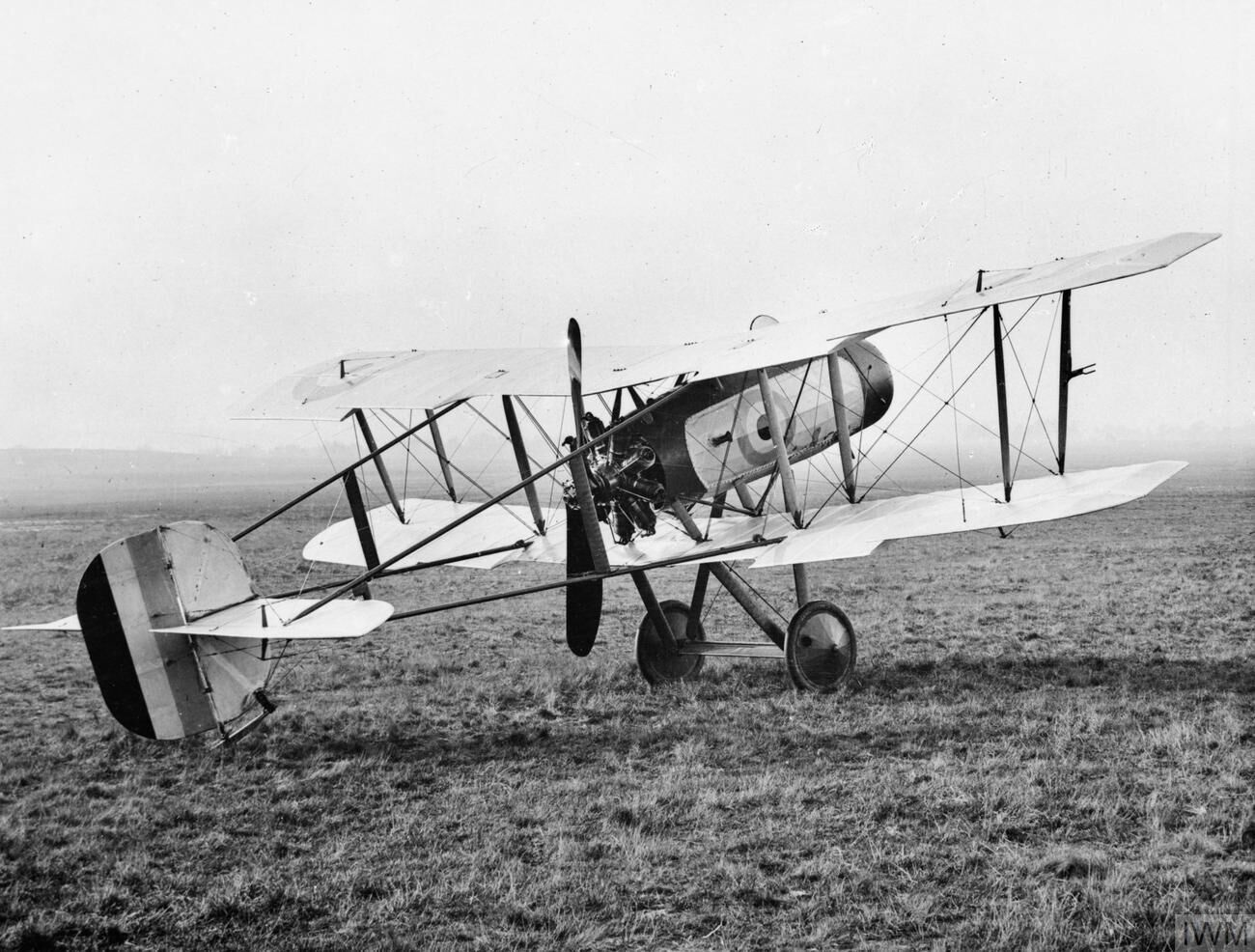

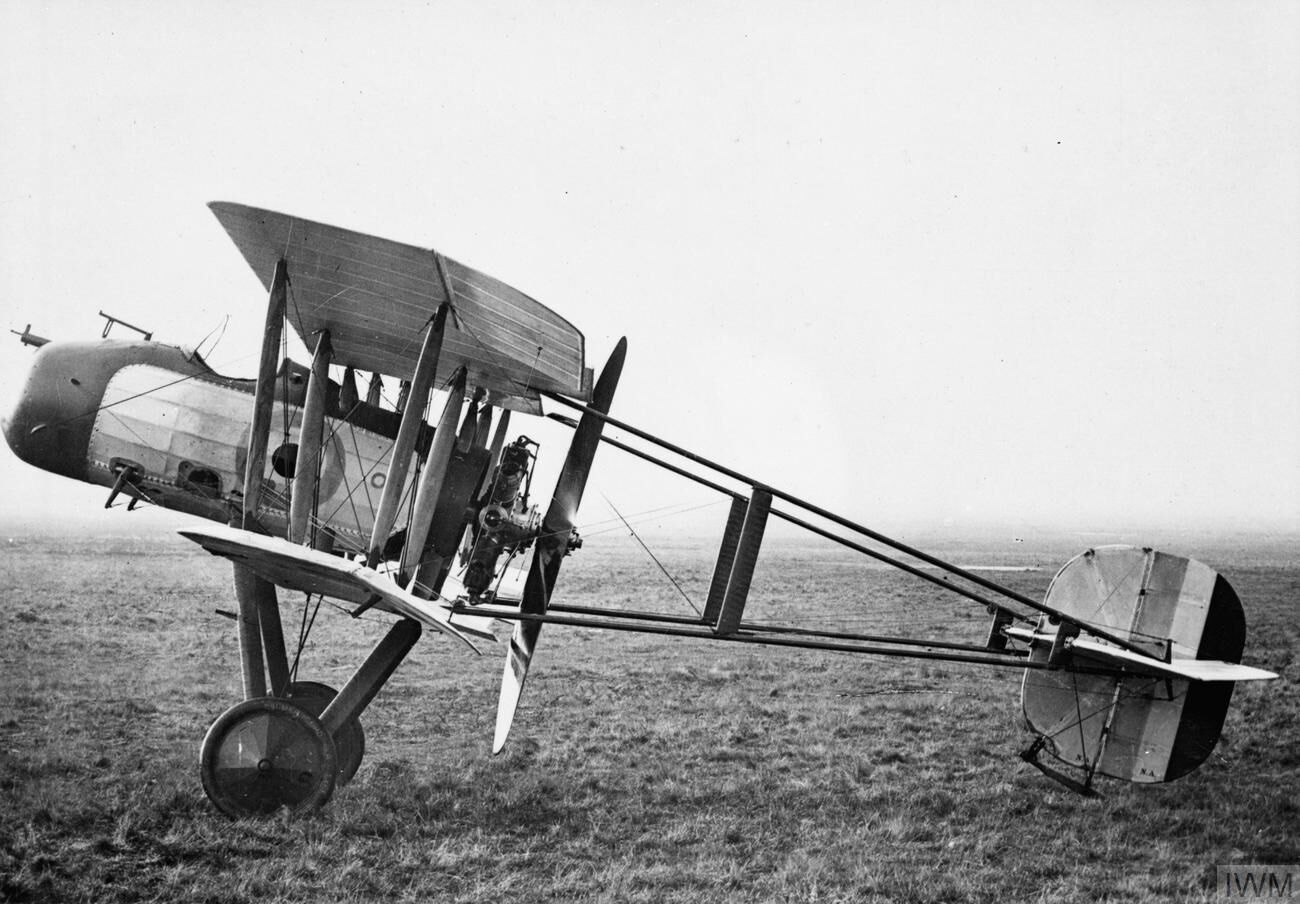

== Operators ==
United Kingdom

- Royal Flying Corps

== Variants ==
F.B.12
F.B.12a
Mono-Gnome engine
F.B.12b
150 hp (110 kW) Hart radial engine
F.B.12c
flat-sided nacelle, larger fin and rudder. 18 production aircraft built.
F.B.12d
110 hp (80 kW) Le Rhone or 100 hp (75 kW) Gnome Monosoupape engine

== Specifications (F.B.12) ==
Data from War Planes of the First World War: Volume Three

General characteristics

- Crew: 1
- Length: 21 ft 6 in (6.55 m)
- Upper wingspan: 26 ft 0 in (7.92 m)
- Lower wingspan: 24 ft 0 in (7.32 m)
- Height: 8 ft 8 in (2.64 m)
- Wing area: 204 sq ft (19.0 m^{2})
- Empty weight: 845 lb (383 kg)
- Gross weight: 1,275 lb (578 kg)
- Powerplant: 1 × Gnome Monosoupape nine-cylinder rotary engine, 100 hp (75 kW)

Performance

- Maximum speed: 86 mph (138 km/h, 75 kn) at 6,500 ft (2,000 m)
- Endurance: 3 hr
- Service ceiling: 11,500 ft (3,500 m)
- Time to altitude: 27 min 35 s to 10,000 ft (3,000 m)

Armament

- Guns: One .303 in Lewis gun

== See also ==
- Airco DH.2
- Royal Aircraft Factory F.E.8

Related lists

- List of aircraft of the Royal Flying Corps
- List of fighter aircraft
