= Voisin III =

French WW1 bomber aircraft

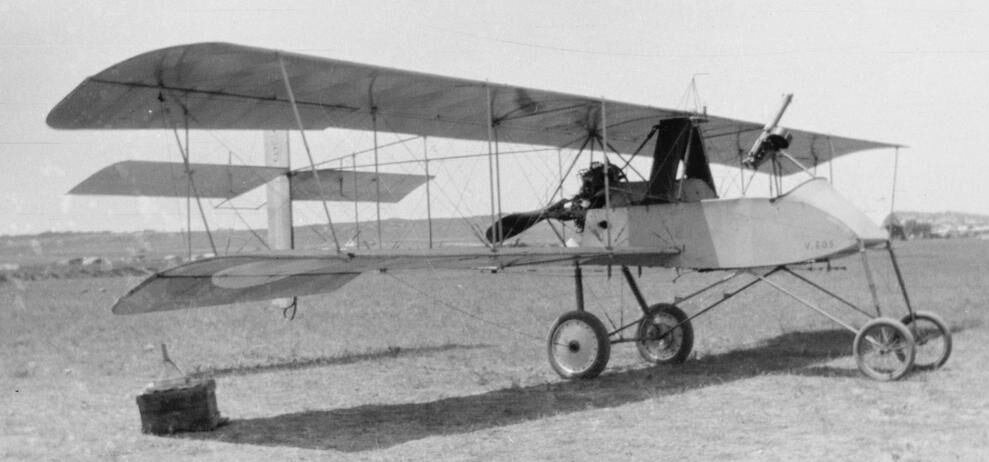

General information
- Type: Bomber
- Manufacturer: Voisin
- Designer: Gabriel Voisin
- Primary users: Aéronautique Militaire Imperial Russian Air Service; Corpo Aeronautico Militare
- Number built: 1,350+

History
- Manufactured: 1914–1916
- Introduction date: 1914
- First flight: 1914
- Retired: before 1922
- Developed from: Voisin L
- Variants: Voisin IV and Voisin V

The Voisin III was a French World War I two-seat pusher biplane multi-purpose aircraft developed by Voisin in 1914 as a more powerful version of the 1912 Voisin L. It is notable for being the aircraft used for the first successful shooting down of an enemy aircraft on October 5, 1914, and to have been used to equip the first dedicated bomber units, in September 1914.

== Design ==
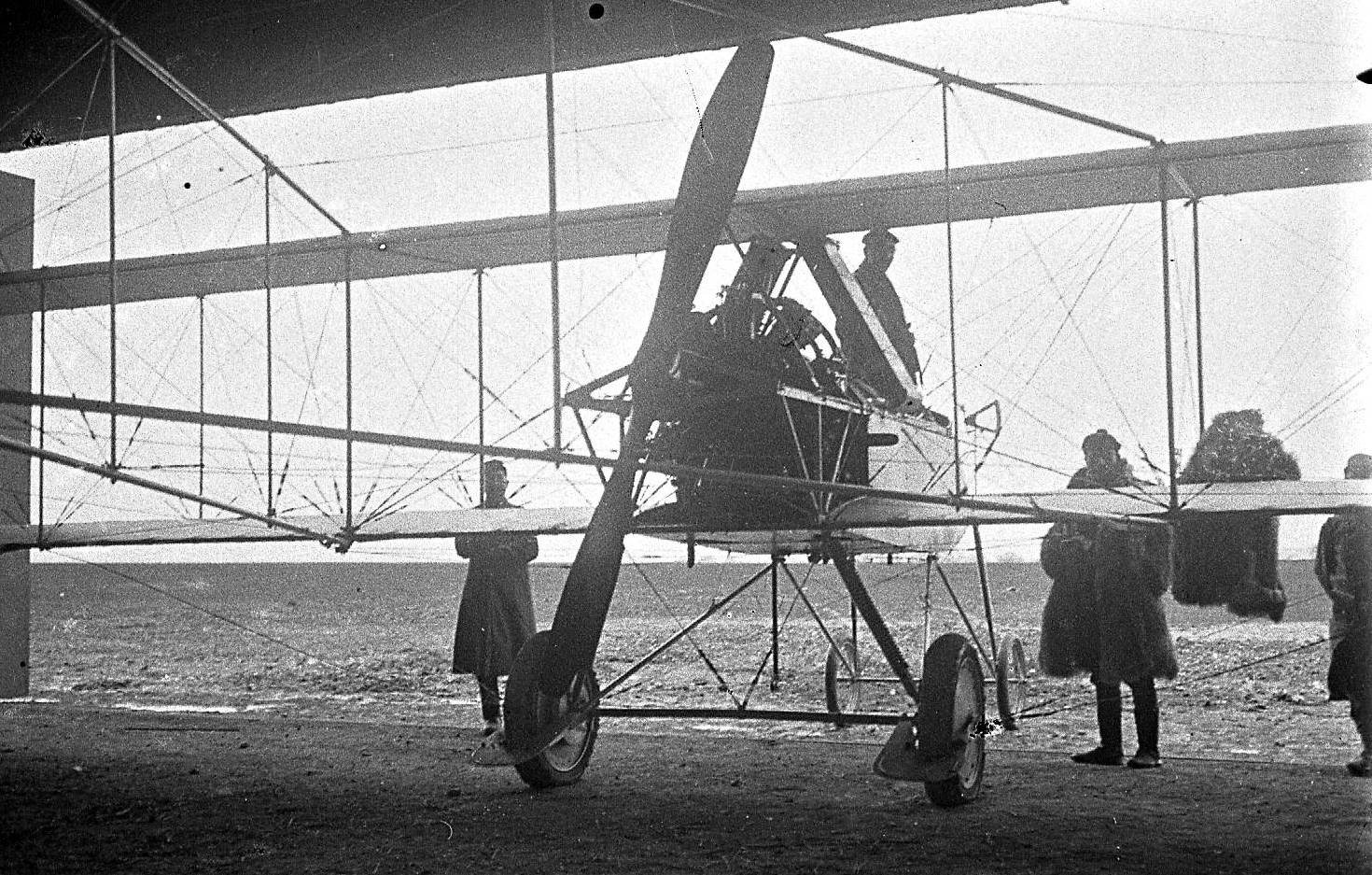
The Voisin III's water cooled Salmson radial engine.

The first Voisin III was initially powered by a single 97 kW (130 hp) Salmson M9 engine water-cooled 9 cylinder radial engine, while later examples used the similar 110 kW (150 hp) Salmson P9 or R9. It had a range of 200 km (120 mi), a top speed of 105–113 km/h (65–70 mph) and a ceiling of 3,350–6,000 m (10,990–19,690 ft) depending on engine and manufacturer. The pilot was ahead of the passenger, who could fire weapons, release bombs or take photos, depending on the mission. It incorporated a light steel frame structure which made it more durable when operating out of makeshift wartime military aviation airfields.

Many aircraft were armed with a Hotchkiss M1914 machine gun mounted on the fuselage operated by a standing observer. Some variants could carry up to 150 kg (330 lb) of bombs.

== Variants ==
- Voisin LA: Company designation for initial production variant.
- Voisin LAS: Company designation for improved III and V versions, with raised (soulevé) engine.
- Voisin LB & LBS: Company designations for 37 mm (1.457 in) cannon armed variants, with staggered wings to offset extra nose weight.
- Voisin III: Government (STAé) designation for LA and LAS versions.
- Voisin IV: Government (STAé) designation for 37 mm (1.457 in) cannon armed variants, with staggered wings.
- Voisin V: Government (STAé) designation for development of III with full chord lower wing, also designated LAS by Voisin.

== Operational history ==
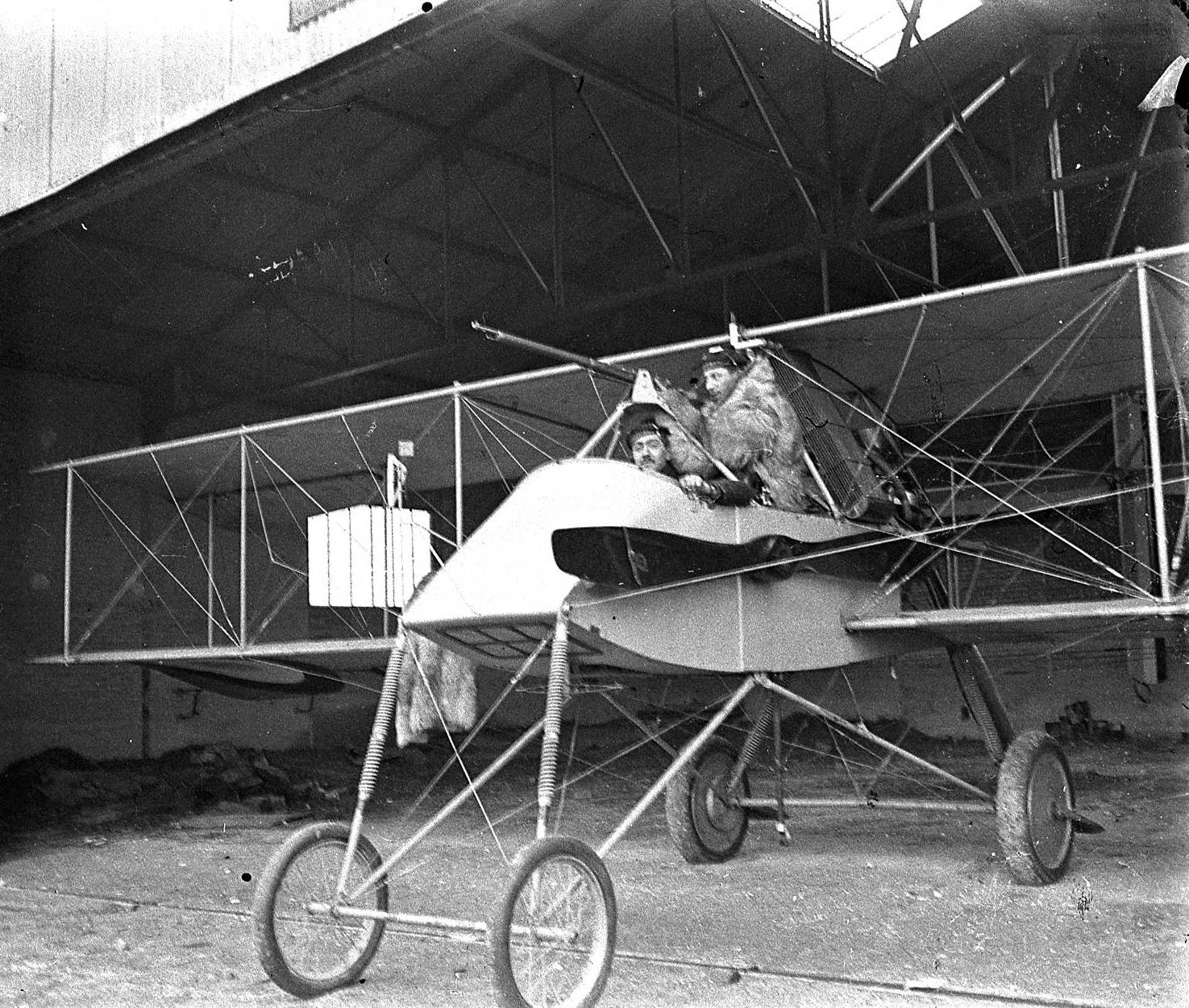
The observer's weapon is mounted above the pilot.

As one of the main types that the French Aviation Militaire chose to standardize on in 1914, the Voisin III quickly became one of the most common Allied bombers early in the war. Significant numbers were purchased by the French and the Imperial Russian Air Force. Russia ordered more than 800 from France and built a further 400 under license at Anatra, Breshnev-Moller, Dux, Lebedev and Schetinin. Over 100 were built in Italy by Societe Italiana Transaera (S.I.T.), and 50 in the United Kingdom, while small numbers were purchased by Belgium and Romania. One French aircraft was forced to land in Switzerland in 1915 after running low on fuel in combat with a German aircraft and was put into service with the Swiss Fliegerabteilung.

Like many aircraft of its era, Voisin III was a multi-purpose aircraft. Its missions included day- and night bombing, reconnaissance, artillery spotting and training.

=== Fighter role ===
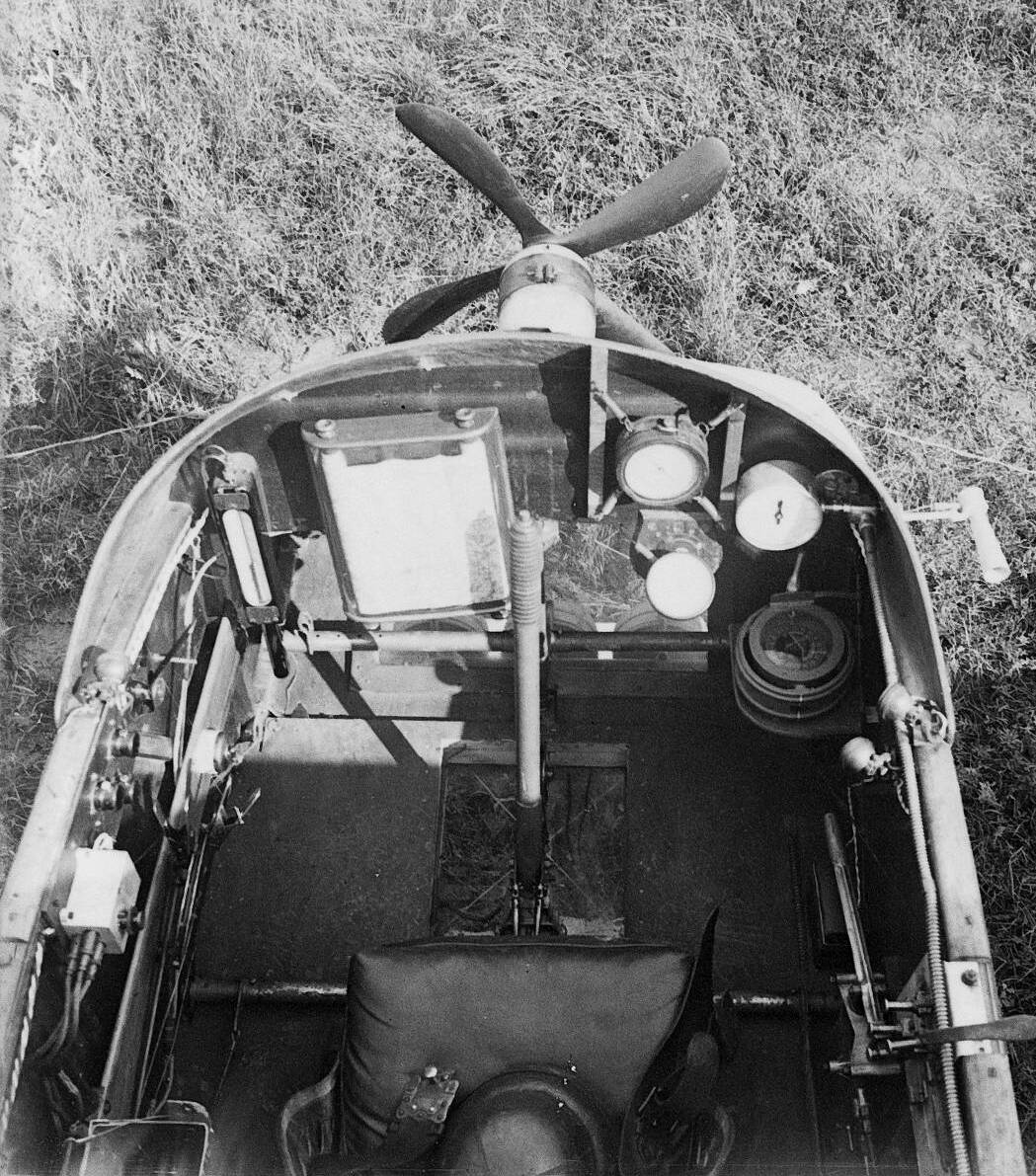
Aircraft cockpit detail

While flying a Voisin III, Sergeant Joseph Frantz and Corporal Louis Quénault of Escadrille V.24 shot down a German Aviatik B.I flown by Oberleutnant Fritz von Zangen and Sergeant Wilhelm Schlichting of FFA 18 over Jonchery, near Reims on October 5, 1914. This was the first time an aircraft had been brought down with small arms fire from another aircraft.

Quénault fired two 48-round magazines from an 8 mm (0.31 in) Hotchkiss M1909 machine gun at the Germans who returned fire with rifles. When the machine gun jammed, he continued firing with a rifle until he succeeded in bringing the German aircraft down.

Previously, Pyotr Nesterov had successfully brought down an enemy aircraft, however that was by ramming.

=== Bomber role ===
The Voisin III is notable in being among the earliest dedicated bombers. The steel frame construction of the aircraft enabled a bomb load of approximately 150 kg (330 lb) to be carried.

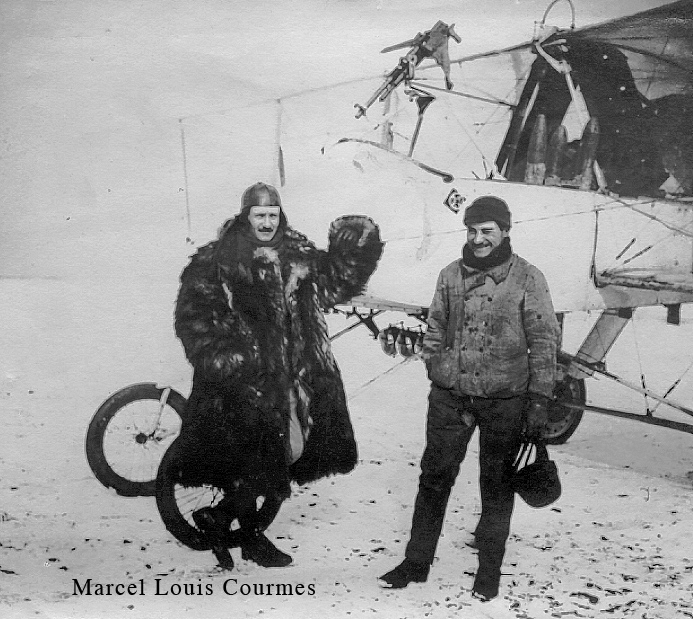
Captain Marcel Courmes, French officer and pilot of the 2nd Bombardment Group GB 2, August 1915.

France was the first country to organize dedicated bomber units, using the Voisin III. Three Escadrilles (squadrons) of the aircraft comprised the first bomber group, GB1 (groupe de bombardement 1), formed in September 1914 under the leadership of Commandant de Goÿs. de Goÿs’ contribution both as a tactical leader and theoretician is significant in developing the theory and practice of long range bombing sorties. An almost unopposed bombing campaign was conducted by GB1 during the early months of 1915, culminating in a retaliatory attack against the Badische Anilin Gesellschaft at Ludwigshafen, Germany, on 26 May 1915, shortly after the German Army introduced poison gas in battle. Of the 18 aircraft which took part, only Goÿs himself failed to return when his Voisin suffered a mechanical failure.

Following the success of GB1, other bomber groups were formed and successful daytime attacks on targets within Germany ensued throughout the summer and autumn of 1915. As many as 62 aircraft were involved. By 1916 the Voisin III was clearly obsolete and had become dangerously vulnerable to German fighter aircraft. With mounting losses, the Voisin III was withdrawn from daylight operations and restricted to night bombing. Among other types, it was replaced by the similar Voisin V.

== Operators ==
Belgium

- Aviation Militaire Belge
  - Escadrille 3
  - Escadrille 6

France

- Aéronautique Militaire
  - Army Co-operation units
    - Escadrille V.14
    - Escadrille V.21
    - Escadrille V.24
  - Bomber units
    - Groupe de Bombardment GB 1
      - Escadrille VB.1 - later redesignated VB.101
      - Escadrille VB.2 - later redesignated VB.102
      - Escadrille VB.3 - later redesignated VB.103
    - Groupe de Bombardment GB 2
      - Escadrille VB.4 - later redesignated VB.104
      - Escadrille VB.5 - later redesignated VB.105
      - Escadrille VB.6 - later redesignated VB.106
    - Groupe de Bombardment GB 3
      - Escadrille VB.107
      - Escadrille VB.108
      - Escadrille VB.109
    - Groupe de Bombardment GB 4
      - Escadrille VB.110
      - Escadrille VB.111
      - Escadrille VB.112
- French Navy

Italy

- Servizio Aeronautico
  - 1st Gruppo Squadriglia Aviatori (3rd Armata)
    - 5^{a}/25^{a} Squadriglia
    - 7^{a}/27^{a} Squadriglia - transferred to 2nd Armata
  - 2nd Gruppo Aeroplani Undine (2nd Armata)
    - 35^{a} Squadriglia
  - 303^{a} Squadriglia
  - 305^{a} Squadriglia

Romania

- Corpul Aerian Român operated eight aircraft
  - Grupul 1
  - Grupul 2
  - Grupul 3

Russian Empire

- Imperial Russian Air Service
  - 2nd Army
    - 2nd Aviation Artillery Unit
- Imperial Russian Naval Air Service

Serbia

- Serbian Aeroplane Escadre

Soviet Union

- Soviet Air Forces operated ex-IRAS aircraft until 1925.

Switzerland

- Fliegerabteilung operated one aircraft only

Ukrainian People's Republic

- Ukrainian People's Republic Air Fleet operated six aircraft

United Kingdom

- Royal Flying Corps received 50 aircraft built in the UK
  - 4 Squadron RFC
  - 5 Squadron RFC
  - 7 Squadron RFC
  - 12 Squadron RFC
  - 16 Squadron RFC
  - No. 1 Reserve Airplane Squadron
  - No. 8 Reserve Airplane Squadron
  - No. 4 Wing
- Royal Naval Air Service operated 36 Voisin IIIs.
  - 1 Wing
  - 3 Wing
  - No. 8 Squadron

== Survivors and replicas ==
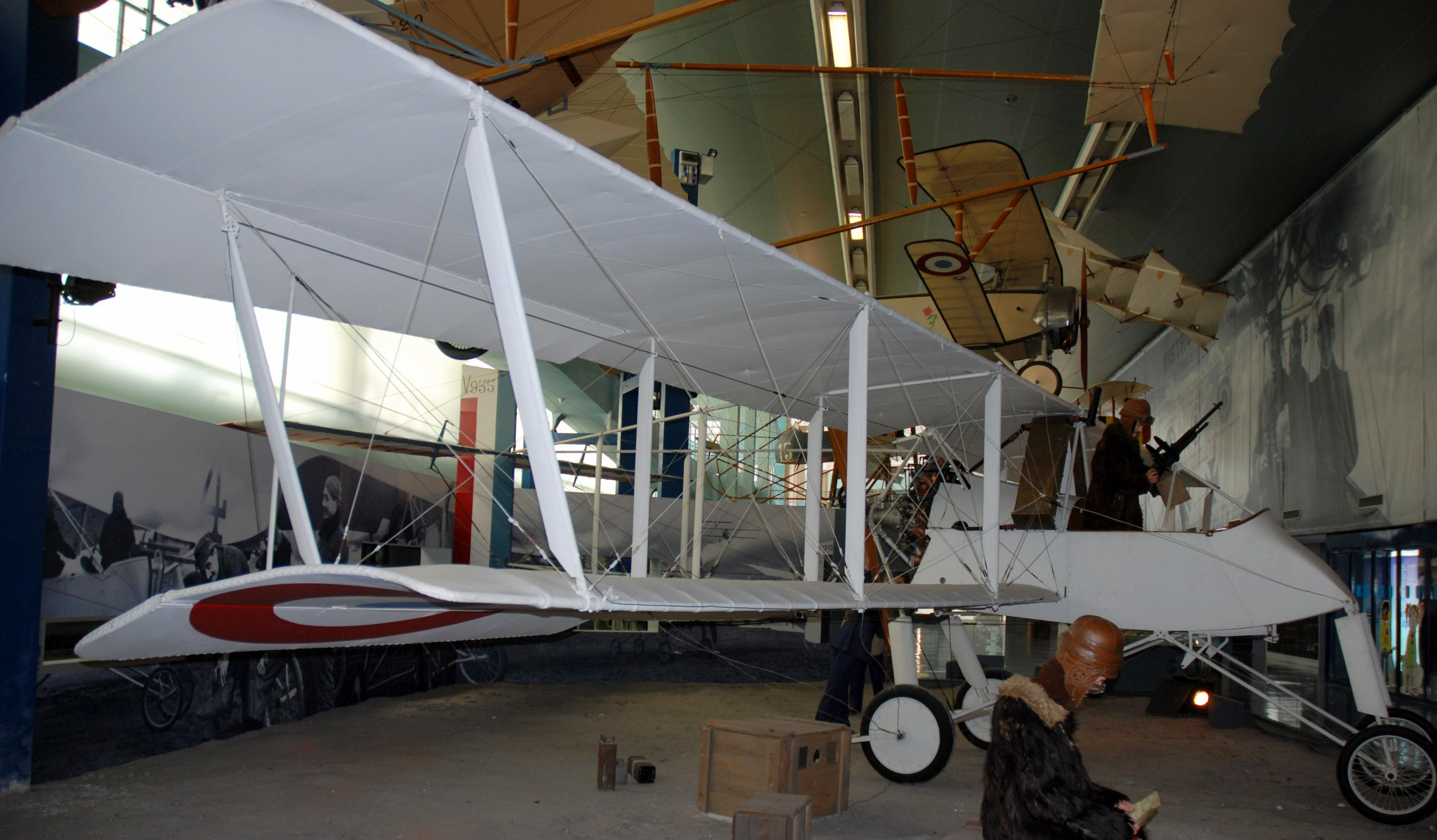
Voisin III at the Musée de l’air et de l’espace

An original 1915 Voisin III B.2/LAS, number 955, is on display at the Musée de l’air et de l’espace at Le Bourget near Paris.

A full-size Voisin replica is on display at the Pearson Air Museum in Vancouver, Washington however it only loosely represents the Voisin L/LA/LAS family and not a specific version.

== Specifications (British-built Voisin LA) ==
Data from The Aeroplanes of the Royal Flying Corps (Military Wing)

General characteristics

- Crew: 2
- Length: 9.5 m (31 ft 2 in)
- Wingspan: 14.74 m (48 ft 4 in)
- Height: 2.95 m (9 ft 8 in)
- Wing area: 49.7 m^{2} (535 sq ft)
- Empty weight: 950 kg (2,094 lb)
- Gross weight: 1,350 kg (2,976 lb)
- Powerplant: 1 × Salmson M.9 9-cylinder water-cooled radial piston engine, 97 kW (130 hp)
- Propellers: 2-bladed fixed-pitch pusher propeller

Performance

- Maximum speed: 105 km/h (65 mph, 57 kn)
- Range: 200 km (120 mi, 110 nmi)
- Endurance: 4½ hours
- Service ceiling: 3,500 m (11,500 ft)
- Time to altitude:
  - 12 minutes to 1,000 m (3,300 ft)
  - 30 minutes to 2,000 m (6,600 ft)

Armament

- Guns: 1 × .303 in Lewis gun
- Bombs: up to 91 kg (200 lb) of bombs

== See also ==
Related development

- Voisin I
- Voisin V

Aircraft of comparable role, configuration, and era

- Farman MF.11
- Farman HF.27
- Otto C.I

Related lists

- List of military aircraft of France
- List of World War I Entente aircraft
- List of aircraft of the Royal Flying Corps
- List of aircraft of the Royal Naval Air Service
- List of bomber aircraft
