= Voisin L =

French pusher biplane

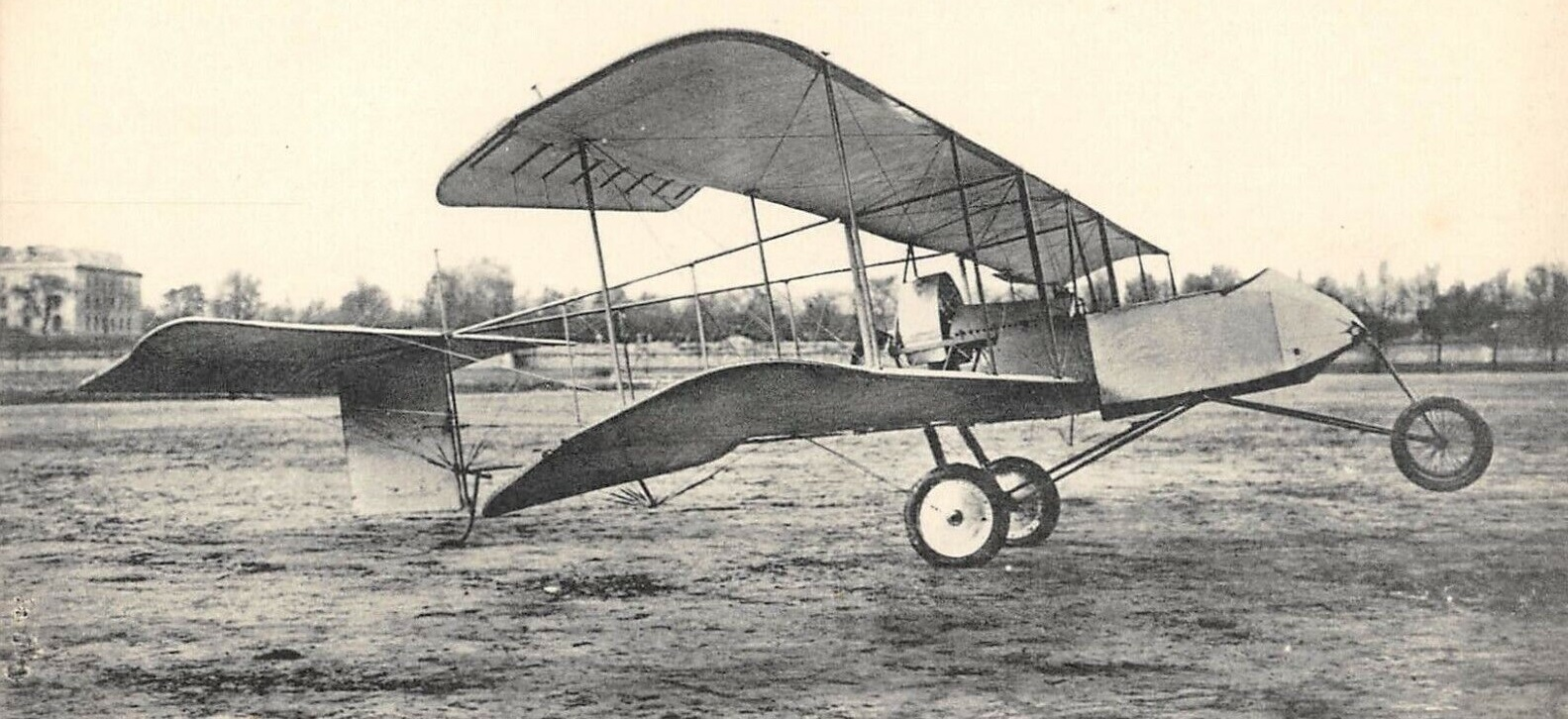

General information
- Type: Reconnaissance, Bomber, Trainer
- Manufacturer: Voisin; Anatra; Dux
- Designer: Gabriel Voisin
- Primary users: Aéronautique Militaire Aéronavale; Imperial Russian Air Service
- Number built: 70 (France); 400 (Russian Empire)

History
- Introduction date: 1913
- First flight: 1912
- Developed from: Voisin Type Bordeaux
- Developed into: Voisin III

The Voisin L was a pusher biplane developed for the French Army's 1912 trials where it performed successfully. About 70 were built in France with around 400 manufactured under license in the Russian Empire. The aircraft was the first in a series of military pusher biplanes from Voisin all of which had similar design characteristics. During the early stages of World War I the aircraft were primarily used for reconnaissance.

The factory name for the aircraft was the Voisin L. From 1915, the official French military designation for Voisin L aircraft powered by the Rhône 9C was the Voisin I (Note: The 1913 edition of Jane's All the World's Aircraft refers to the Voisin 1907 biplane as the Voisin No. I) while those fitted with the Gnome Monosoupape 7A were designated as the Voisin II.

== Design ==
The Voisin L had equal-span wings with no dihedral. A cruciform tail was attached to the wings with booms. A streamlined nacelle carried a pilot and observer in front with a single rotary engine at the rear. Steel tubing was used throughout the structure, making the Voisin-L a robust aircraft for its time-period.

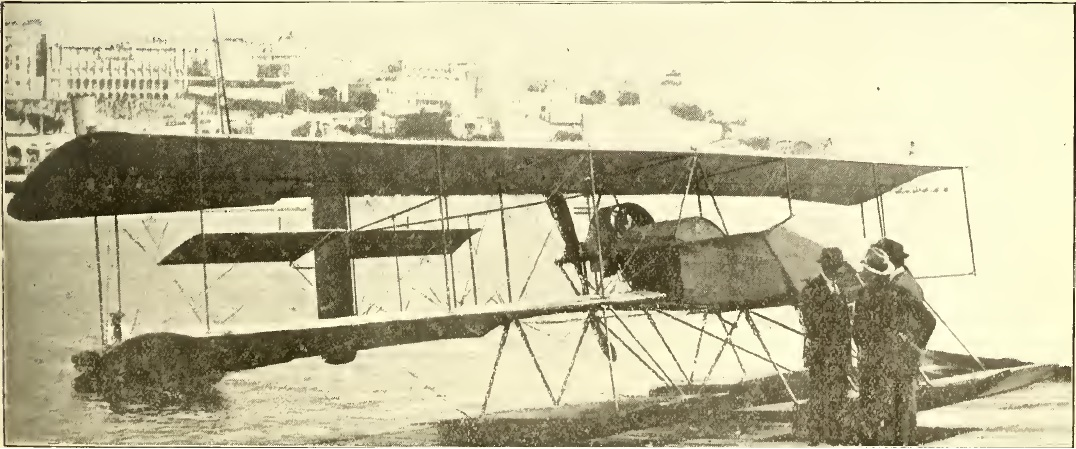
Voisin L floatplane 1915

Land-based versions of the aircraft featured a distinctive quadricycle landing gear. A floatplane version was produced with the quadricycle landing gear replaced with three flat bottomed pontoons.

Voisin-Ls can be distinguished from later Voisin pushers as they were fitted with air-cooled rotary engines and so lacked the bulky radiators seen on Voisin's later aircraft which were powered by water-cooled Salmson 9, Peugeot 8Aa and Renault 12Fe aero-engines. The rotary engine on the Voisin L drove a large two bladed wooden propeller via a reduction gearbox.

== Operational history ==
The prototype Voisin L was developed for the 1912 French military trials using the same sturdy biplane design as the Voisin military pushers exhibited in 1910 and 1911, which were themselves developments of the Voisin Type Bordeaux. By 1912 Gabriel Voisin’s focus was on military sales as the companies' designs had fallen out of favor with the sports aircraft market which had moved towards to light weight tractor monoplanes.

Following the aircraft's successful performance in the 1912 military trials, the French army placed an order for twelve Voisin L aircraft. The order from the military transformed the fortunes of Gabriel Voisin's business and led to an immediate expansion of the company's factory at Issy-les-Moulineaux. The first Voisin L aircraft was delivered to the French army in May 1913. The French Navy placed orders for the floatplane version of the aircraft in August 1913 with the first delivery taking place in October 1913. A total of 70 Voisin L aircraft were built in France with the entire production run having been completed before the start of World War I.

At the start of World War I, Voisin L aircraft (types 1 and 2) were in service with four French squadrons. The aircraft were used for artillery observation and as daylight bombers. Voisin-Ls were in front line service till October 1914 after which remaining aircraft were transferred to training schools. In the winter of 1914/15 the French Airforce was reorganized with production focused on a smaller number of dedicated types. One of the types selected for mass production was the Voisin III.

In the Russian Empire, Voisin L aircraft were manufactured by Anatra in Odesa and the Duk Factory in Moscow. Both manufacturers also license built Voisin III aircraft. A total of 400 Voisin L aircraft were built in the Russian empire with the type remaining in front line service with the Imperial Russian Air Service into 1916.

The Voisin L was the first in a series of pusher biplanes referred to as the 13.5 meter (Note: Although collectively known as the Voisin 13.5 meter, later aircraft in the series have larger wingspans.) or "L" series with STAe designations running from Voisin I to XI. Around 6,000 of the Voisin 13.5 meter series aircraft were built between 1913 and 1918.

== Variants ==
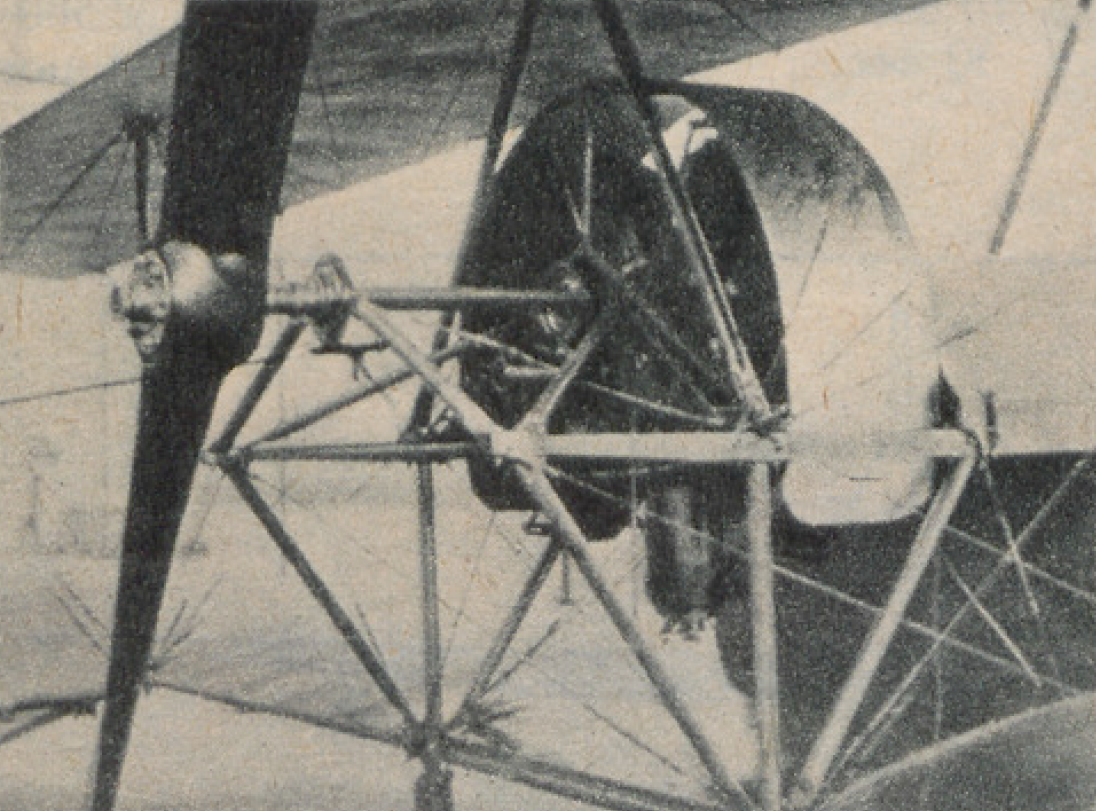
Reduction gear and drive shaft fitted to a Voisin L powered by a Gnome Monosoupape 7A rotary engine

- Type 1, Voisin I or Voisin-Rhône - Fitted with the Rhône 9C
- Type 2, Voisin II or Voisin-Gnome - Fitted with a Gnome rotary engine. Early examples were fitted with the Gnome Omega. Later examples used the seven-cylinder variant of the Gnome Monosoupape.
- 3 B.2 - Fitted with dual controls for flying school use. Powered by the Rhône 9C.
- 3 D.2 - Fitted with dual controls for flying school use. Powered by the Gnome Monosoupape 7A.

Type 1 and 2 are designations applied retrospectively by the French military from 1915 onwards. Contemporary names for the aircraft included, Voisin 13.5‑meter, referring to its wingspan; Voisin Model 1912, denoting the year of its initial presentation at military trials; and Voisin Model 1913, marking the type's introduction into operational service. In all cases Voisin L was the aircraft's factory designation.

== Operators ==
France

- French Air Force
- French Navy

Russia

- Imperial Russian Air Service

== Specifications (Type 1) ==
Data from Renato

General characteristics

- Crew: 2 (pilot and observer)
- Length: 10.5 m (34 ft 5 in)
- Wingspan: 13.5 m (44 ft 3 in)
- Height: 2.9 m (9 ft 6 in)
- Wing area: 42 m^{2} (450 sq ft)
- Empty weight: 825 kg (1,819 lb)
- Gross weight: 1,100 kg (2,425 lb)
- Powerplant: 1 × Le Rhône 9C rotary engine, 60 kW (80 hp)
- Propellers: 2-bladed fixed-pitch pusher propeller driven at ~600 rpm (half the engine speed) via a gearbox

Performance

- Maximum speed: 95 km/h (59 mph, 51 kn)
- Time to altitude: 1,000 m (3,281 ft) in 11 minutes

Armament

- Bombs: Up to 59 kg (130 lb) carried inside the nacelle and dropped over the side by the observer

== See also ==
Aircraft of comparable role, configuration, and era

- Farman HF.16
- Farman MF.7
- Vickers F.B.5

Related lists

- List of military aircraft of France
- List of World War I Entente aircraft
- List of pusher aircraft by configuration
