= Jorge Chávez =

Peruvian aviator

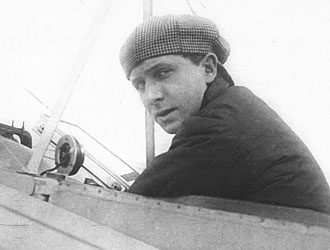
- Chávez in his Bleriot XI, on September 23, 1910, four days before his death.
- Born: January 13, 1887; Paris, French Third Republic
- Died: September 27, 1910 (aged 23); Domodossola, Kingdom of Italy
- Occupation: Aviator
- Parent(s): Manuel Chávez Moreyra; María Rosa Dartnell y Guisse

Georges Antoine Chavez (January 13, 1887 – September 27, 1910), also known as Jorge Chávez or Géo Chavez, was a Peruvian aviator. At a young age, he achieved fame for his aeronautical feats. He died in 1910 after a heavy wind broke the wings of his fragile airplane Bleriot XI, falling from a twenty-meter height upon landing, after achieving the first air crossing of the Pennine Alps.

== Early life ==
Georges Chavez was born in Paris, France to Peruvian parents Manuel Chávez Moreyra and María Rosa Dartnell y Guisse. He studied at the Violet School, from which he graduated with an engineer's degree in 1908.

== Career ==
Chávez attended the school of aviation established by Henry and Maurice Farman where he got his pilot license and undertook his first flight in Reims on February 28, 1910. Afterwards he participated in several aviation competitions throughout France and other European countries. On August 8 of the same year he took a Blériot monoplane to Blackpool, England where he achieved fame after attaining an altitude of 1,647 meters (5,405 ft). He improved his mark by flying at 2,700 meters (8,700 ft) over the city of Issy, France on September 6.

== Death ==
After this successful series, Chávez decided to undertake the first air crossing of the Pennine Alps (but not the Alps). This attempt was made in response to a prize of $20,000 offered by the Aero Club of Italy for the first aviator to make the trip alive. After several delays due to bad weather, he took off from Ried-Brig, Switzerland on September 23, 1910, and made his way through the Simplon Pass. Before departing he said, "Whatever happens, I shall be found on the other side of the Alps". Fifty-one minutes later he arrived at his destination, the city of Domodossola, Italy, but his plane crashed upon landing. It is believed that the airplane had been damaged previously and inadequately repaired, which caused the aircraft to break under the heavy winds of the mountains. Badly injured but conscious, Chávez was taken to San Biaggio Hospital of Domodossola, where he was officially declared winner of the competition and received telegrams from all over the world congratulating him for his achievement. He also received the visit of the president of the Aero Club of Italy and gave one last interview to his friend the journalist Luigi Barzini, telling all the details of his flight. He died four days later of massive blood loss. His last words were, "Arriba, siempre arriba, hasta las estrellas" ("Higher, always higher, until the stars"), according to the testimony of his friend and compatriot aviator Juan Bielovucic.

== Legacy ==
The death of Jorge Chávez caused great commotion in the aviation world. Brig and Domodossola, the start and end points of his last flight, dedicated monuments to the lost aviator. In Peru, Chávez became an icon for aviation-related institutions such as the Air Force. His remains were initially buried in France but repatriated to Peru in 1957, where they currently rest at the Officers' School of the Peruvian Air Force at Las Palmas. The International Airport of Lima, inaugurated in 1960, is named after him. A life-sized replica of Chávez famous Blériot XI monoplane is still on display at the air terminal. As Chavez spent most of his flying career in France with French-made aeroplanes and was very popular in France at the time, the city of Paris named a street after him in the 20th Borough (20° arrondissement) of Paris.

He appears as a character in scenes drawing upon his real-life tragic flight over the Alps in John Berger's novel G. (1972), awarded the Booker Prize in 1972.

== Gallery ==
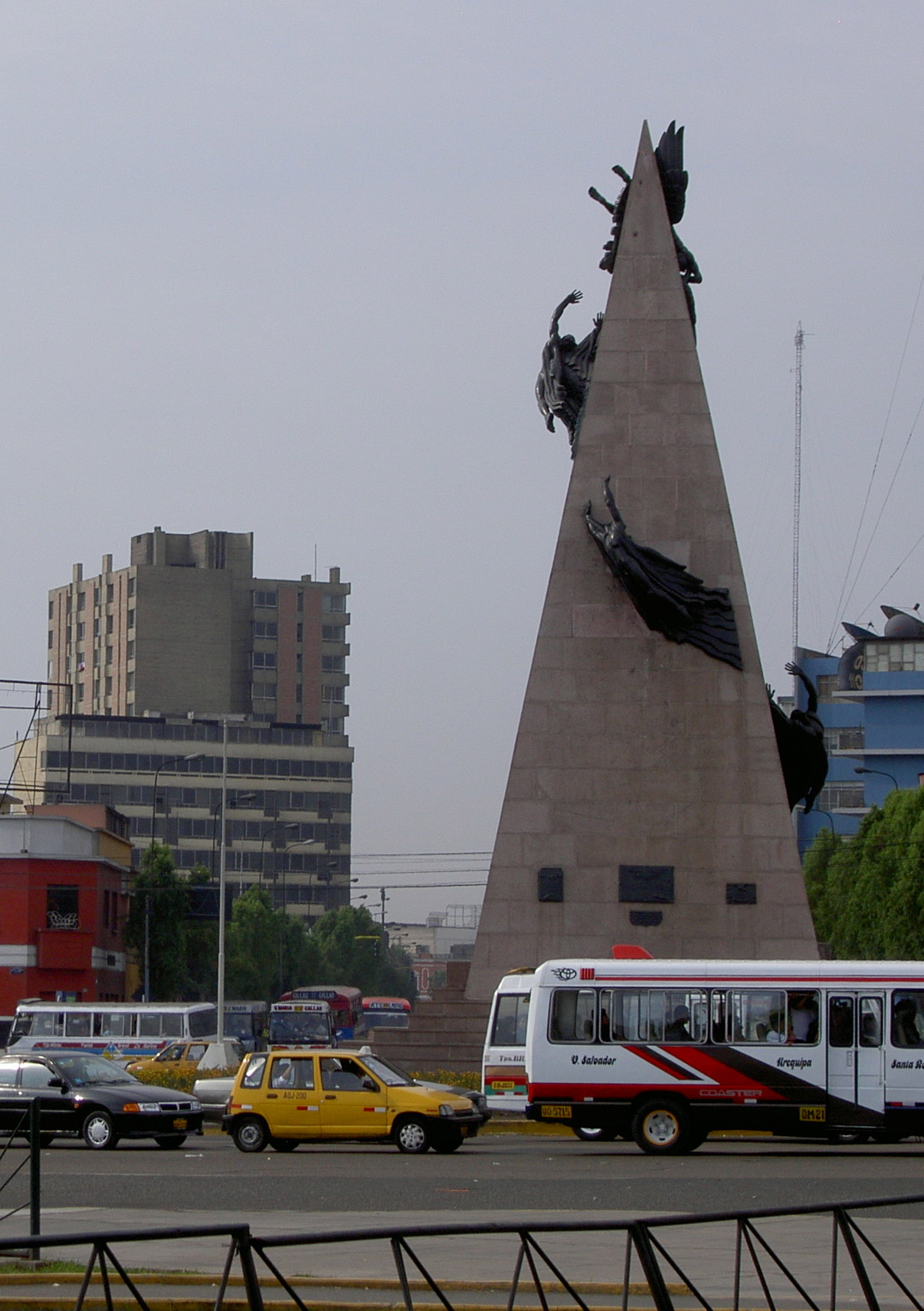
Monument to Jorge Chávez in Lima, Perú

Memorial to Jorge Chávez in the market square of Brig

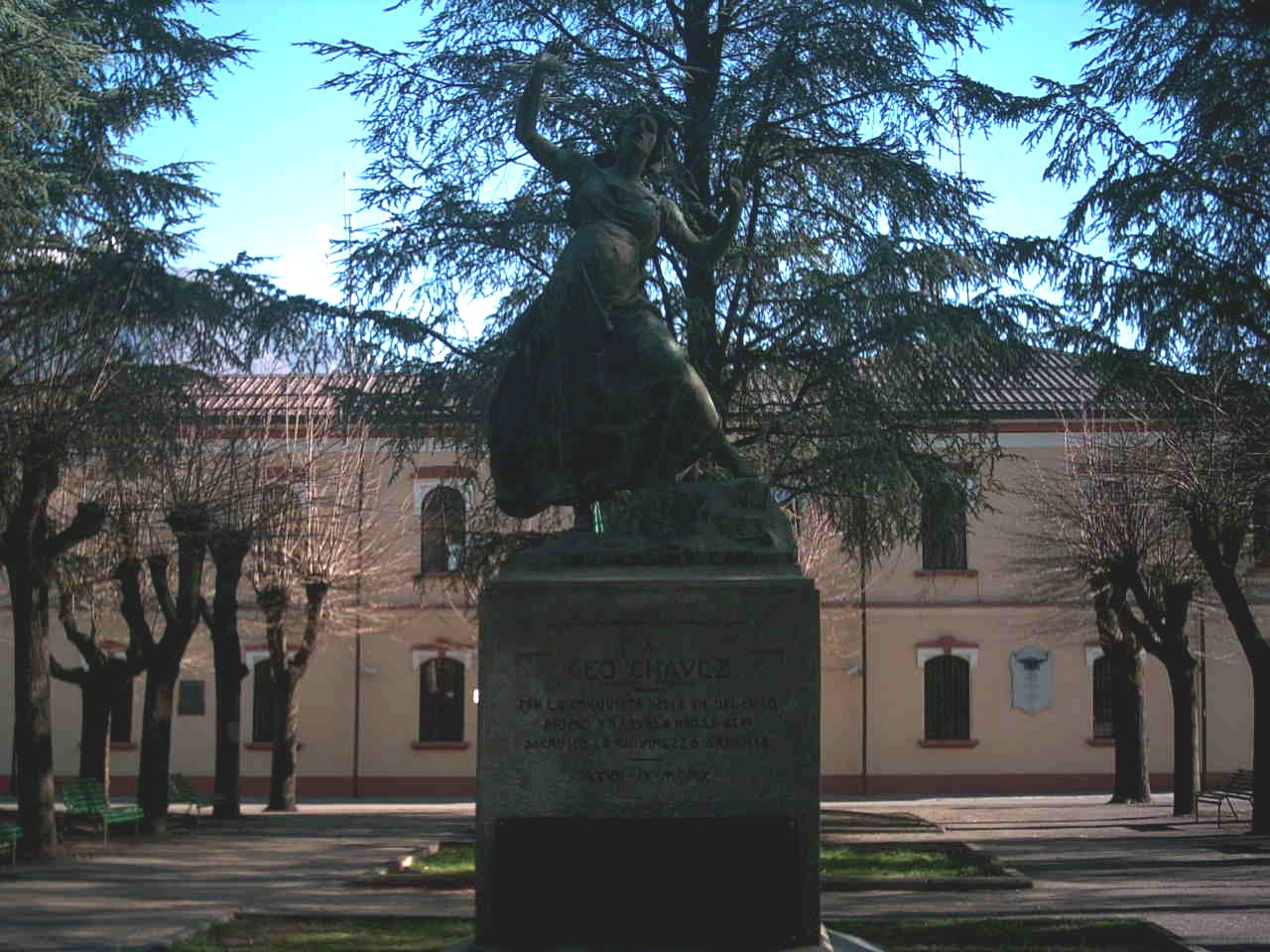
Monument to Jorge Chávez in Domodossola

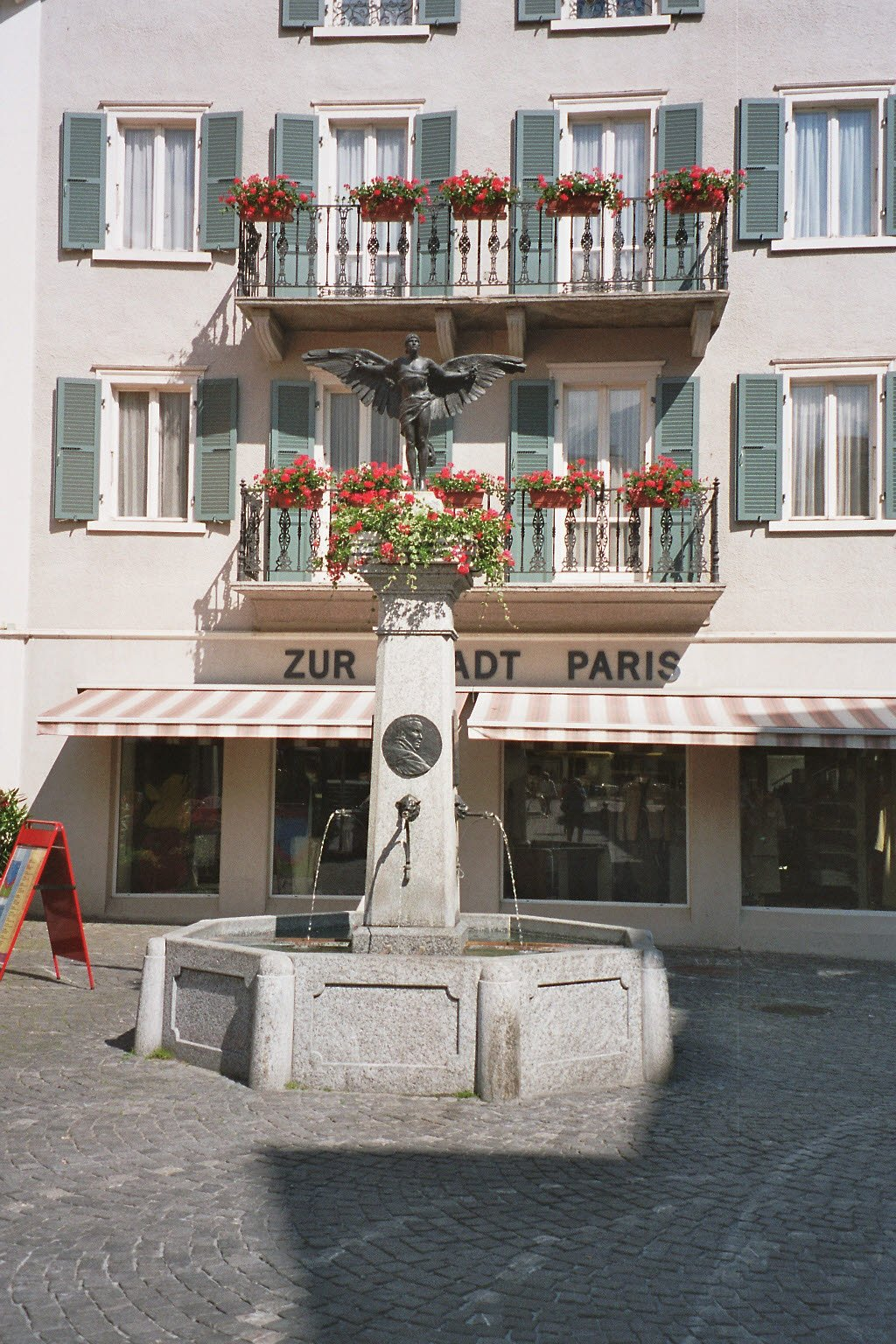
Monument to Jorge Chávez in Brig

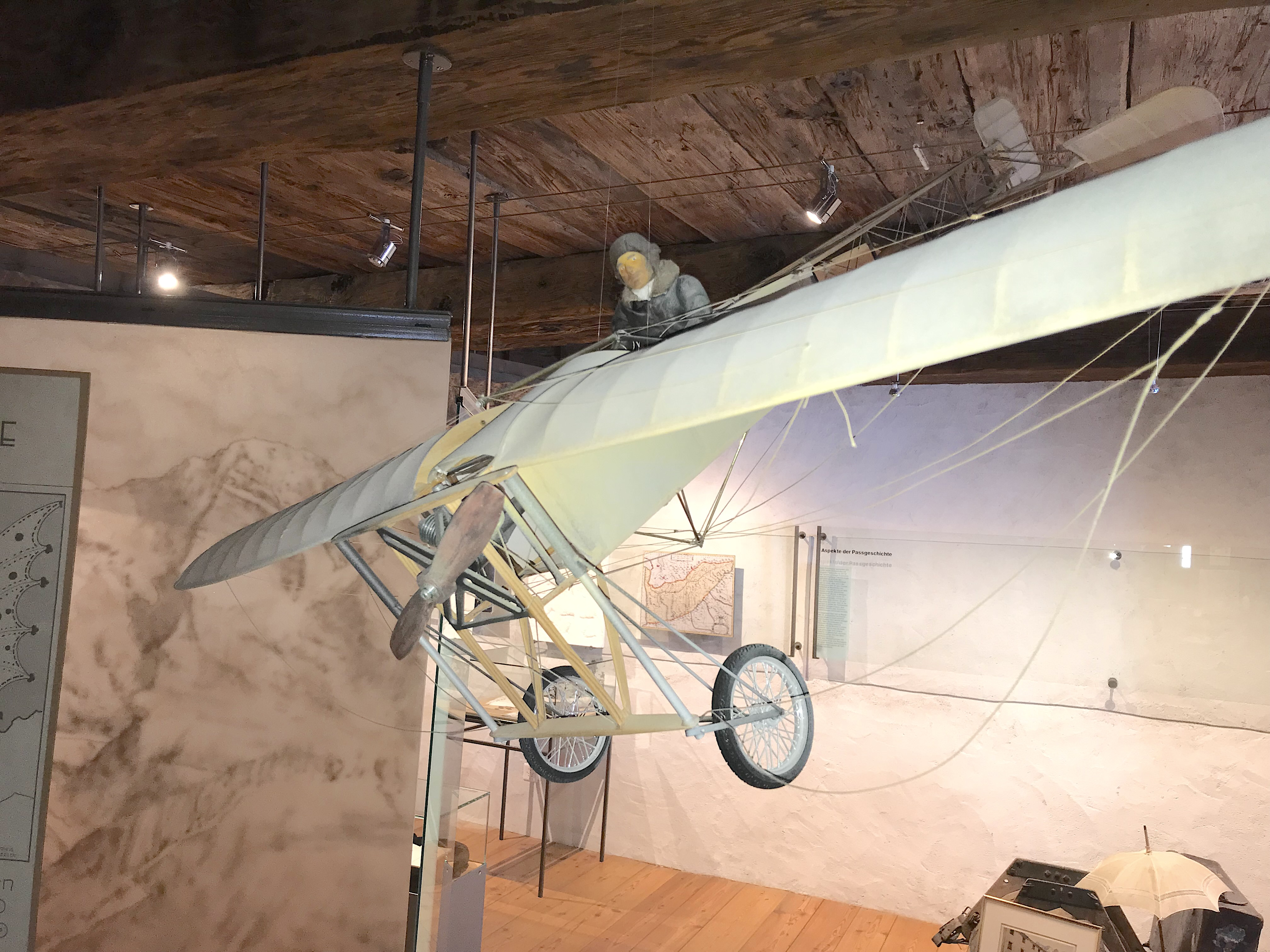
Model of Jorge Chávez and his aircraft in the museum of Simplon-Dorf

== See also ==
- 1910 in aviation
- Jorge Chávez International Airport
- List of aviators killed in aircraft crashes
- Oskar Bider

== Bibliography ==
- (in Spanish) Basadre, Jorge. Historia de la República del Perú. Lima: Editorial Universitaria, 1983.
- (in Spanish) Museo Aeronáutico del Perú. Jorge Chávez.
- (in Spanish) Tauro del Pino, Alberto. Enciclopedia Ilustrada del Perú. Lima: Peisa, 2003.
- Warth, John. "Adventurers of the Air". In Whitney, Caspar (Editor). Collier’s Aviation Pioneers. 1911.
