= Voisin Type Bordeaux =

1910s French aircraft

Type Bordeaux
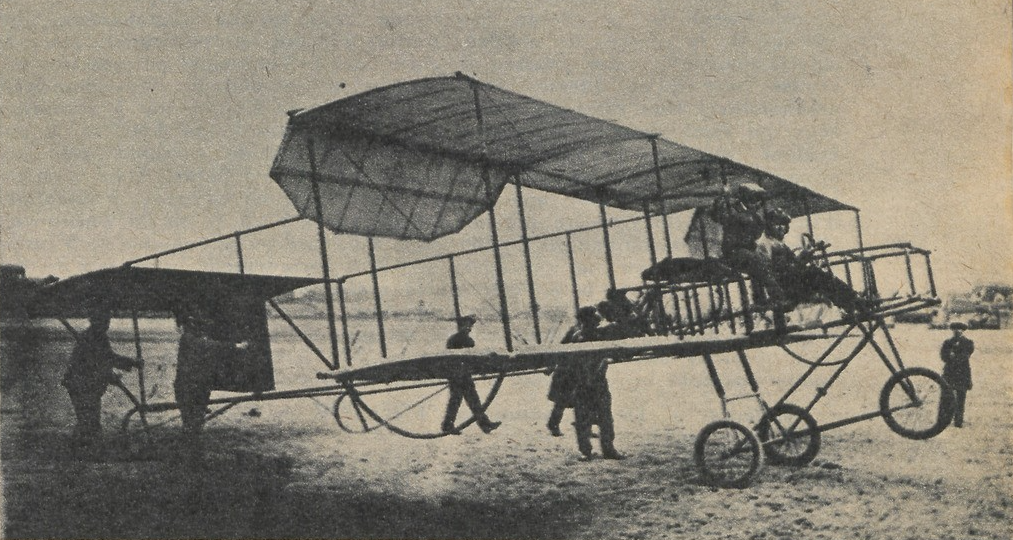
- The aircraft used by the aviator Juan Bielovucic on his famous 1910 Paris-Bordeaux flight

General information
- Type: Sports aircraft
- National origin: France
- Manufacturer: Voisin Frères
- Designer: Gabriel Voisin

History
- First flight: 1910
- Developed into: Voisin L

The Voisin Type Bordeaux was an aircraft built by Voisin Frères in 1910, so named because it was used by Juan Bielovucic to make a record-breaking flight from Paris to Bordeaux in France. The design differed significantly from previous Voisin designs in eliminating the forward-mounted elevator.

== Design and development ==
The Type Bordeaux was a two-bay equal span pusher configuration biplane powered by a Gnome Omega 7 cylinder rotary engine driving an aluminium bladed Voisin propeller mounted at the rear of the uncovered wooden nacelle. The tail surfaces, carried on four wire-braced steel booms, consisted of a horizontal stabiliser and elevator mounted between the upper pair of booms with a single centrally mounted rudder beneath it. The structure made extensive use of steel tubing, and the flying surfaces were covered with "Continental" brand rubberised fabric. Lateral control was effected by large D-shaped ailerons mounted on the upper wing: these were controlled by foot pedals. The rudder and elevator were activated by a control wheel which was turned to control the rudder and moved forwards and backwards to control the elevator. It had a tricycle undercarriage consisting of a pair of mainwheels mounted on sprung steel struts below the wing and a nosewheel below the front of the nacelle, although the aircraft at rest rested on the two mainwheels and skids mounted at the rear of the lower pair of tailbooms.

The type became famous after a flight between Paris and Bordeaux made in September 1910 by Juan Bielovucic, who intended to compete in an aviation meet being held in Bordeaux and flew there from Paris in order to save the expense of sending the aircraft by rail. The 540 km (340 mi) flight was made in four stages (Paris–Orléans, Orléans–Châtellerault, Châtellerault–Angoulême and Angoulême–Bordeaux) over three days, in a total flying time of 6 hrs. 15 mins. This set a new record for cross-country flight, and Bielovucic was given a medal by the Bordeaux Departmental Assembly.

The design was turned into two seat production variants; the Voisin Type Militaire and the Voisin Type de Tourism. The type Militare underwent several design iterations which eventually led to the prototype Voisin L of 1912.

== Variants ==
- Type Militaire - Variant featuring folding outer wing panels and dual controls. Wing area of 42 m^{2} (452 sq ft).

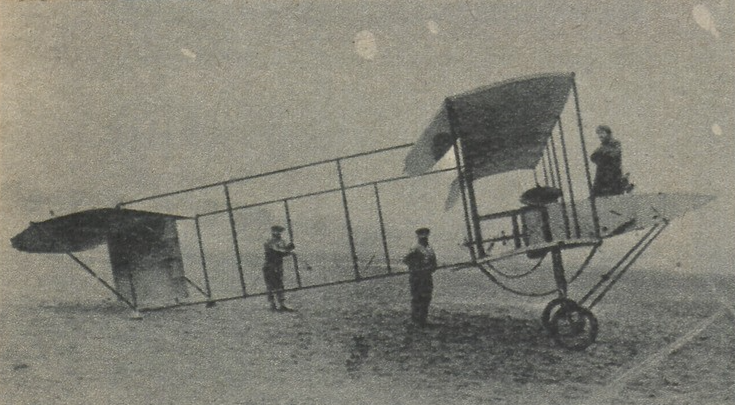
Voisin tourism type of 1910. A two-seat variant of the Voisin Bordeaux aimed at private buyers.

- Type de Tourisme - Smaller sized variant with folding outer wing panels and dual controls. Wing area of 32 m^{2} (344 sq ft).

== Specifications ==
Data from l'Aérophile 15 September 1910, p. 411

General characteristics

- Crew: 1
- Length: 10 m (32 ft 10 in)
- Wingspan: 11 m (36 ft 1 in)
- Empty weight: 400 kg (882 lb)
- Gross weight: 680 kg (1,499 lb)
- Powerplant: 1 × Gnome Omega 7 cylinder rotary engine, 37 kW (50 hp)
- Propellers: 2-bladed Voisin, 2.50 m (8 ft 2 in) diameter

Performance

- Maximum speed: 85 km/h (53 mph, 46 kn) (estimated)
