= Juan Bielovucic =

Peruvian aviator (1889–1949)

- Juan Bielovucic, c. 1913
- Born: 30 July 1889; Lima, Peru
- Died: 14 January 1949 (aged 59); Paris, France
- Military career
- Allegiance: Peru; France
- Branch: Peruvian Aviation Corps; Service Aéronautique of the French Army
- Rank: Colonel (Peruvian Aviation Corps)
- Nickname: Bielo
- Units: Escadrille les Cigognes (Service Aéronautique)
- Commands: lieutenant commander of the Peruvian Aviation Corps Reserve
- Conflicts: World War I
- Awards: Legion of Honour; Croix de guerre 1914–1918 with a bronze palm
- Other work: Held several aviation records Peruvian air attaché in France

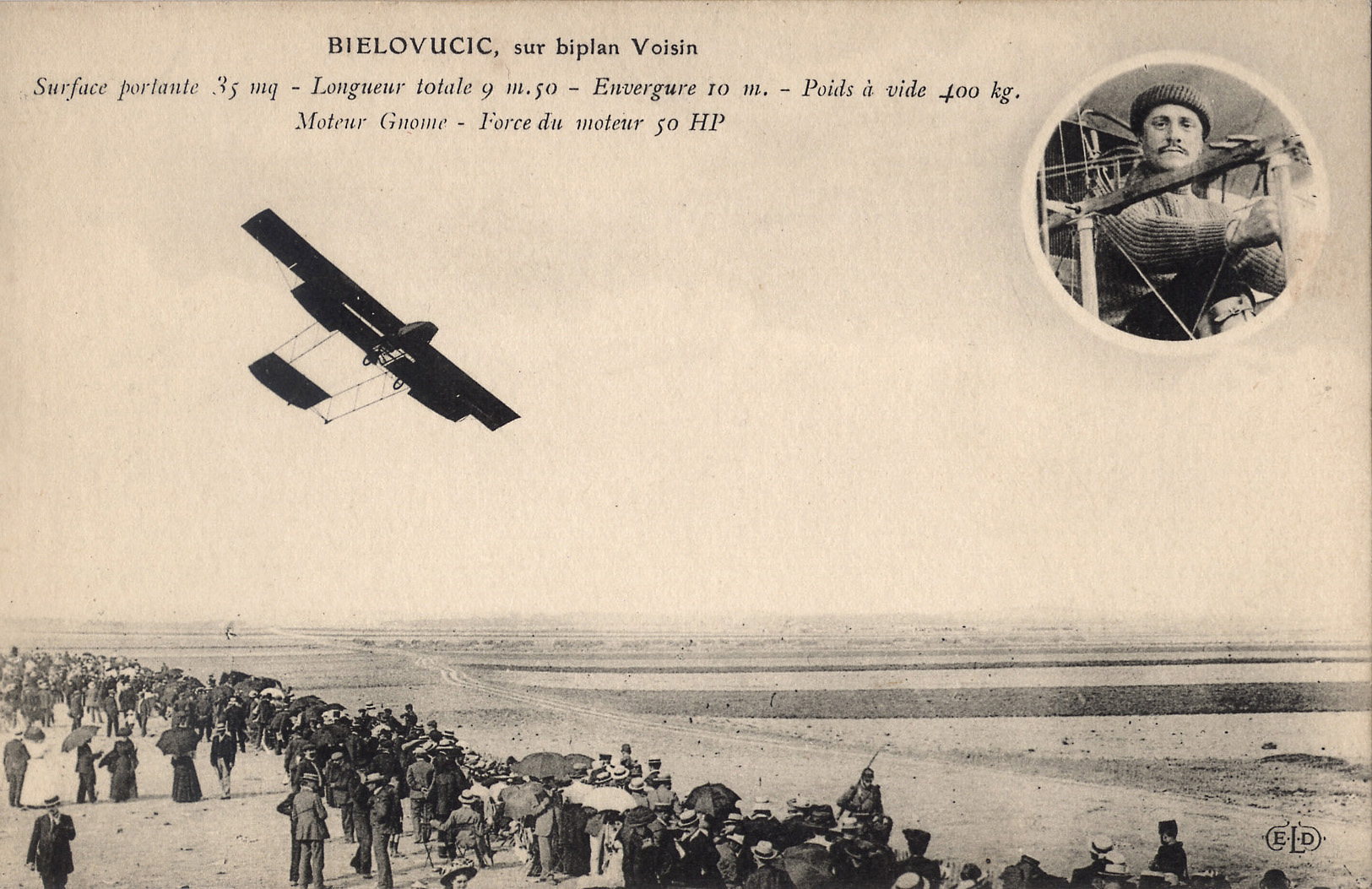
Jean Bielovucic on a Voisin biplane

Juan Bielovucic (30 July 1889 – 14 January 1949) was a Peruvian aviator who set several speed and altitude aviation records in 1910–13. He was also the first person to complete a successful powered aircraft crossing of the Alps in 1913, following a 1910 attempt by his friend Jorge Chávez that ended in a fatal crash landing. He established the first aviation school in South America in Lima, Peru. Bielovucic became a colonel of the Peruvian Aviation Corps (PAC) in 1911, joined the Service Aéronautique of the French Army as a volunteer in 1914 and earned the Legion of Honour for his service in World War I. He retired from active aviation in 1920 and returned to Peru where he became the lieutenant commander of the PAC Reserve. He was also active with the French Resistance during World War II. In Croatia, he is regarded as the first Croatian aviator.

== Early life ==
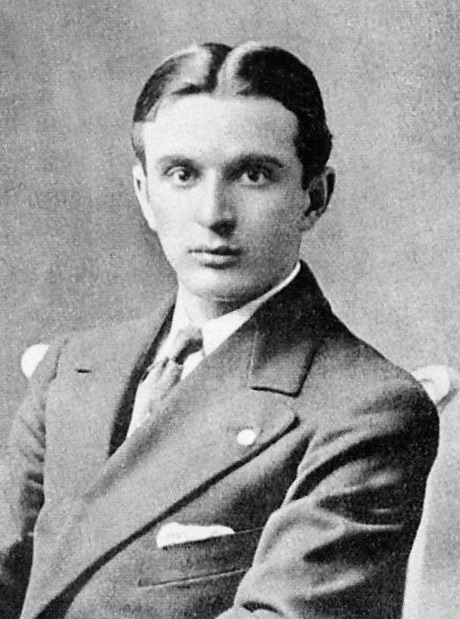
Juan Bielovucic

Juan Bielovucic was born on 30 July 1889 in Lima, Peru, to Croat father Miho Bjelovučić (Juan Miguel Bielovucic) and French mother Adriana Cavalié. The couple had moved to Peru after Bielovucic's father, originally from Mokošica in Rijeka Dubrovačka area, retired from his position as a merchant navy captain. When Bielovucic was eight, his father fell ill and moved to Dubrovnik where he died shortly afterwards. After his death, Bielovucic and his mother moved to live with her relatives in France. Bielovucic attended school and university in Paris where he graduated with degrees in philosophy and literature. He was nicknamed "Bielo".

== Aviation career ==
In 1908, Bielovucic enrolled in the Voisin brothers' flying school and was awarded flying licence number 87 by the Aéro-Club de France on 10 June 1910. He took part in the first Budapest airshow on 1–15 June 1910, registering under his Croatian name as Ivan Bjelovučić. On 1–3 September, he flew a new aircraft from Paris to Bordeaux with four stopovers: he reached Orléans, 75 miles (121 kilometres) away, on 1 September, continued the next morning to 90 miles (140 kilometres) distant Poitiers; and completed the 64-mile (103 km) third leg of the journey to Angoulême. The final part of the trip was completed at noon on 3 September, when he landed in Bordeaux. The 540-kilometre (340 mi) distance was covered in six hours and fifteen minutes of flying, representing a world record. The new type became known as the Voisin Type Bordeaux. In 1910 he entered Circuito Internationale Aereo Di Milano flying a Voisin aircraft. He took part in Le Bourget Air Show and completed the 295-kilometre (183 mi) Paris–Nancy flight in 1911, setting a new record of two hours and fifty minutes for the route.

On 15 January 1911, Bielovucic returned to Peru, bringing with him an airplane and the technical staff requested by the Peruvian Aviation League. In Santa Beatriz, he took off piloting the first aircraft flight in Peru, flying over Lima, Callao and above the Pacific Ocean coast. The flight was witnessed by the President of Peru Augusto B. Leguía and other dignitaries. On 29 January he completed a 20-minute flight from Lima to Ancón, a day before he became a flight instructor in the first flying school in South America. In early 1911 he became Peruvian Aviation Corps (PAC) colonel and returned to France as an air force envoy.

On 12 May 1911 his aircraft caught fire as he took off from Issy airfield, but Bielovucic survived by jumping from the aircraft at a low altitude. On 28 May, he took part in the Paris–Rome–Turin air race, and in August joined the 2nd Military Competition in France flying a Hanriot monoplane. In late 1912 he set a climb rate record in a Blériot monoplane, climbing to 2,200 metres (7,200 feet) in 12 minutes. That year, Le Matin readers voted Bielovucic the best French aviator.

In 1913 Bielovucic was the first to successfully cross the Alps by airplane, flying a Hanriot monoplane powered by an 80-horsepower (60 kW) engine, completing the crossing first attempted by his late countrymate Jorge Chávez on 23 September 1910. Chávez had almost completed his flight, but lost control of his final descent, crashed from an altitude of 10 metres (33 feet), and sustained fatal injuries. Bielovucic chose to cross the Alps in winter because he noted that the Alpine winds were less frequent then. His first attempt of 14 January failed, and he returned to the starting airfield. He made a second attempt to cross on 25 January, taking off from Brig-Glis, Switzerland at noon, and successfully landed in Domodossola in Italy at 12:25. During the flight, he reached an altitude of 3,200 metres (10,500 feet), setting another record. Later that year, he set another climb rate record, climbing 1,000 metres (3,300 feet) in 150 seconds in a 60-horsepower (45 kW) Le Rhône engine-powered Ponnier monoplane.

In 1914, as World War I began, he joined the Service Aéronautique of the French Army as a volunteer, being assigned to the Escadrille les Cigognes as a French and Peruvian officer. He flew numerous reconnaissance flights over Belgium until he was wounded. Bielovucic was awarded the Legion of Honour, as well as the Croix de guerre with a bronze palm and a number of Belgian and Peruvian medals. Later on he worked as the head of an engine testing team in Bellanger and then as the principal of an aviation school in Reims. Bielovucic retired from active piloting in 1920, and returned to Peru where he became lieutenant commander of the PAC Reserve, regarded as a national hero.

== Later life and legacy ==
During World War II, while posted in Paris as Peruvian air attaché, Bielovucic actively cooperated with the French Resistance. At the age of 57, he parachuted from the Eiffel Tower. Bielovucic died in Paris on 14 January 1949 and was buried at the Cimetiere nouveau de Neuilly in the Nanterre commune of Paris. His biography was written by Lieutenant General José Zlatar Stambuk of the Peruvian Air Force and published in 1990. In Croatia, he is regarded as the first Croatian aviator because of his paternal ethnic origin. He is known as Ivan Bjelovučić there, while most sources refer to him as Jean Bielovucic or Juan Bielovucic Cavalié.

In late September 1910 Bielovucic took Filippo Tommaso Marinetti, founder of the Futurist movement, over Milan as a passenger in a Voisin biplane during the International Air Week. Marinetti stated that the experience moved him to his new concept of art.
