= École d'ingénieurs généralistes La Rochelle =

Engineering school in France

Coordinates: 46°08′24″N 1°09′17″W

Ecole d'Ingenieur en Genie des Systems Industriels (Industrial systems engineering school)
- Former names: Ecole d'Electricité et de Mécanique Industrielles de Paris
- Motto: Votre vie d'ingénieur commence ici
- Motto in English: Your engineering life starts here
- Type: Engineering school, Grandes écoles
- Established: 1990, Can be traced back to the Ecole d’Electricité et de Mécanique Industrielles de Paris established 1901 in Paris
- Affiliations: Commission des titres d'ingénieur, IngéFrance
- Chancellor: Frédéric THIVET
- Location: La Rochelle, Casablanca, France, Morocco
- Website: www.eigsi.fr/

L'Ecole d'Ingénieurs en Génie des Systémes Industriels, also known as EIGSI (can be translated into 'Industrial systems engineering school'), is an engineering school (grande école) situated in La Rochelle, a town on the Atlantic Ocean on the west coast of France.

The EIGSI is a generalist engineering school, meaning that all the students are given a truly multidisciplinary education. In their fourth year, out of five, a specialisation can be chosen between: mechanical engineering, mecatronics, information systems, energy and environment, industrial management.

Upon completion of the 5 years of study, and the required industry internships, a Master of Engineering is delivered (equivalent to 'diplôme d'ingénieur' in the French academic system).

== History ==
- 1902: the 'Ecole d’Electricité et de Mécanique Industrielles de Paris' (also referred as 'Ecole Violet' due to its location on 'Violet Street') was established in Paris, at the time teaching a small class of students electricity and mechanical engineering for the industry.
- 1987: the school leaves Paris and the alumni association take upon the challenge of creating a generalist engineering school tailored to answer the needs of industrial companies.
- 1990: the EIGSI - Ecole d'Ingénieurs en Génie des Systèmes Industriels opens for the first time in La Rochelle.
- 1991: the EIGSI is officially accredited by the CTI Commission des titres d'ingénieur meaning that it is officially recognised as able to deliver engineering degrees that meet the French and European criteria.
- 2004: the EIGSI has opened an additional 6 months managerial training course called the 'MIND'. It can be completed upon graduation.
- 2006: the EIGSI has opened an additional campus in Casablanca in Morocco. Exchanges between the 2 campuses is made possible and students from Casablanca are welcomed to spend a semester in La Rochelle.
- 2007: the EIGSI participated as one of the major actor in the creation of the engineering school network IngéFrance.

== Ranking and performance ==
The EIGSI was placed at the 25th position out of 67 in a 2009 survey comparing similar engineering school across France.

== Notable alumni ==
- Jorge Chávez, Peruvian aviator
