= JSC Dux =

Russian missile and launching system company

Dux Kommunar Plant

Open Joint Stock Company Dux (formerly Moscow Kommunar Machine-Building Plant; Russian: Московский машиностроительный завод «Коммунар») is a company based in Moscow, Russia. It produces air-to-air missiles and launching systems for fighter aircraft and aircraft cabin instrument and components.

The company was established in 1893 During the war the factory produced RS-82 rockets, Berezin UB machine guns and other weapons.

From 1963 to 1992 the company was known as Moscow Kommunar Machine-Building Plant. In 1992 the plant became known as Open Joint Stock Company Dux.

== See also ==
- Dux Factory
