= Farman HF.16 =

1910s French reconnaissance aircraft

HF.16

General information
- Type: Reconnaissance
- Manufacturer: Farman; Anatra; Dux; V.V Slyusarenko Factory
- Designer: Henri Farman
- Primary users: Imperial Russian Air Service Belgian Air Component
- Number built: 300 (Russian Empire)

History
- First flight: 1912
- Developed into: Farman HF.20

The Farman HF.16 was a reconnaissance aircraft built in France shortly before the First World War. Aircraft of this type were also produced under license in the Russian Empire and served with the Imperial Russian Air Service during World War One.

== Operators ==
Belgium
Aviation Militaire Belge/Belgische militaire luchtvaart - received four HF.16s in 1912
Russia
Imperial Russian Air Service

== Specifications (HF.16) ==
Data from

General characteristics

- Crew: 2
- Length: 8.10 m (26 ft 7 in)
- Wingspan: 13.75 m (45 ft 1 in)
- Height: 3.15 m (10 ft 4 in)
- Wing area: 35 m^{2} (380 sq ft)
- Empty weight: 250 kg (551 lb)
- Max takeoff weight: 660 kg (1,455 lb)
- Powerplant: 1 × Gnome Delta 9-cylinder air-cooled rotary piston engine, 75 kW (100 hp)
- Propellers: 2-bladed fixed-pitch wooden pusher propeller

Performance

- Maximum speed: 105 km/h (65 mph, 57 kn)
