= Farman HF.20 =

French WW1 reconnaissance aircraft

HF.20
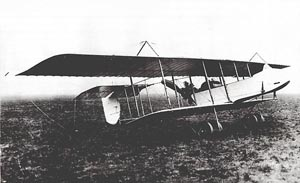

General information
- Type: Reconnaissance aircraft
- Manufacturer: Farman
- Designer: Henri Farman

History
- First flight: 1913
- Developed from: Farman HF.16

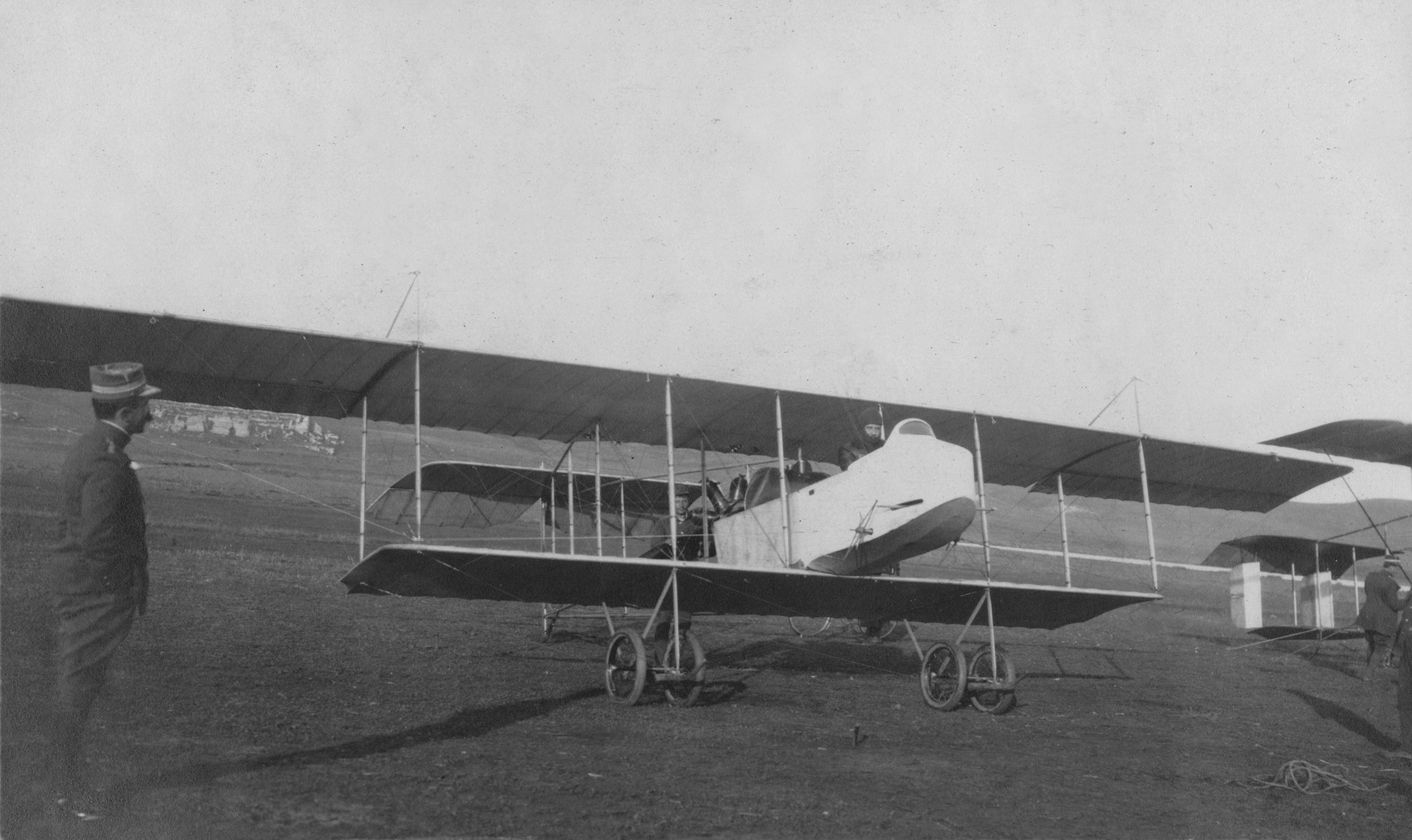
A HF.20 biplane at Nicopolis airfield, near Preveza, in December 1912

The Farman HF.20 and its derivatives were a family of reconnaissance aircraft produced in France shortly before and during the First World War. It was a refined version of the Farman MF.11 "Shorthorn" that did away with the type's distinctive landing skids, and incorporated design features from Henri Farman's designs. It entered service with the French, Belgian and Serbian armies in 1913 (two aircraft conducted reconnaissance during the Siege of Scutari in the First Balkan War and one crashed), and with the British RFC and RNAS shortly after the outbreak of war. The type was also licence-built in the UK by Airco and Grahame-White.

The HF.20 was seriously underpowered, and a variety of engines were trialled in the hope of correcting this, none with much success. The problem was eventually solved only when an engine of twice the power of the original powerplant was fitted to the HF.27 variant, by which time the aircraft was already obsolete. Nevertheless, the performance of the HF.20 made it adequate for use on secondary fronts.

== Variants ==
HF.20
original version with Gnome Lambda engine
HF.21
15.5 m (51 ft) span and increased wing area version with Gnome Lambda engine. At least one of the few built, entered service with the Fliegertruppe of Switzerland.
HF.22
15.58 m (51.1 ft) span and increased wing area version with Gnome Lambda engine.
HF.22 floatplane
(a.k.a. HF.22bis or Savoia-built HF.22-H)
HF.23
18.08 m (59.3 ft) span version with Gnome Lambda engine
HF.24
11.5 m (38 ft) span aerobatic version with Gnome Lambda engine
HF.27
155 hp (116 kW) Canton-Unné R9 engine or 240 hp (180 kW) Renault engine with a revised undercarriage that included nose wheels similar to the Voisin III.

== Operators ==
HF-20 of the Swiss Air Force during the First World War

Argentina

- Argentine Air Force

Belgium

- Belgian Air Force

Denmark

- Royal Danish Air Force

France

- Aéronautique Militaire

Escadrille HF 1
Escadrille HF 7
Escadrille HF 13
Escadrille HF 19
Escadrille HF 28
Escadrille HF 32
Greece

- Royal Hellenic Navy

Kingdom of Italy

- Corpo Aeronautico Militare

Japan

- Imperial Japanese Navy Air Service

Netherlands

- Royal Netherlands Air Force

Romania

- Romanian Air Corps

Russia

- Imperial Russian Air Service

Serbia

- Serbian Air Force

Soviet Union

- Soviet Air Force - Taken over from the Imperial Russian Air Force.

Sweden

- Swedish Air Force
- Swedish Navy

Switzerland

- Swiss Air Force

United Kingdom

- Royal Flying Corps
  - No. 2 Squadron RFC
  - No. 5 Squadron RFC
  - No. 6 Squadron RFC
  - No. 10 Squadron RFC
  - No. 24 Squadron RFC
  - No. 26 Squadron RFC
  - No. 30 Squadron RFC
  - No. 31 Squadron RFC
  - No. 32 Squadron RFC
  - No. 64 Squadron RFC
- Royal Naval Air Service

Union of South Africa

- South African Aviation Corps

== Specifications (HF.20) ==
Data from French aircraft of the First World War

General characteristics

- Crew: 2 (pilot and observer)
- Length: 8.06 m (26 ft 5 in)
- Wingspan: 13.65 m (44 ft 9 in)
- Height: 3.15 m (10 ft 4 in)
- Wing area: 35 m^{2} (380 sq ft)
- Empty weight: 360 kg (794 lb)
- Gross weight: 660 kg (1,455 lb)
- Powerplant: 1 × Gnome Lambda 7-cylinder air-cooled rotary piston engine, 60 kW (80 hp)
- Propellers: 2-bladed fixed-pitch wooden pusher propeller

Performance

- Maximum speed: 165 km/h (103 mph, 89 kn)
- Range: 315 km (196 mi, 170 nmi)
- Endurance: 3 hours
- Service ceiling: 1,050 m (3,440 ft)
- Time to altitude: 2,000 m (6,600 ft) in 22 minutes
- Wing loading: 18 kg/m^{2} (3.7 lb/sq ft)

Armament

- Guns: 1 × machine gun on flexible mount for observer
- Bombs: small load of 75 mm (3.0 in) bombs

== Bibliography ==
- Klaauw, Bart van der (March–April 1999). "Unexpected Windfalls: Accidentally or Deliberately, More than 100 Aircraft 'arrived' in Dutch Territory During the Great War". Air Enthusiast (80): 54–59. ISSN 0143-5450.
- Liron, Jean (1984). Les avions Farman. Collection Docavia. Vol. 21. Paris: Éditions Larivière. OCLC 37146471.
- Thomas, Andrew. "In the Footsteps of Daedulus: Early Greek Naval Aviation". Air Enthusiast, No. 94, July–August 2001, pp. 8–9. ISSN 0143-5450
