= Voisin V =

French WW1 bomber aircraft

Voisin Type V
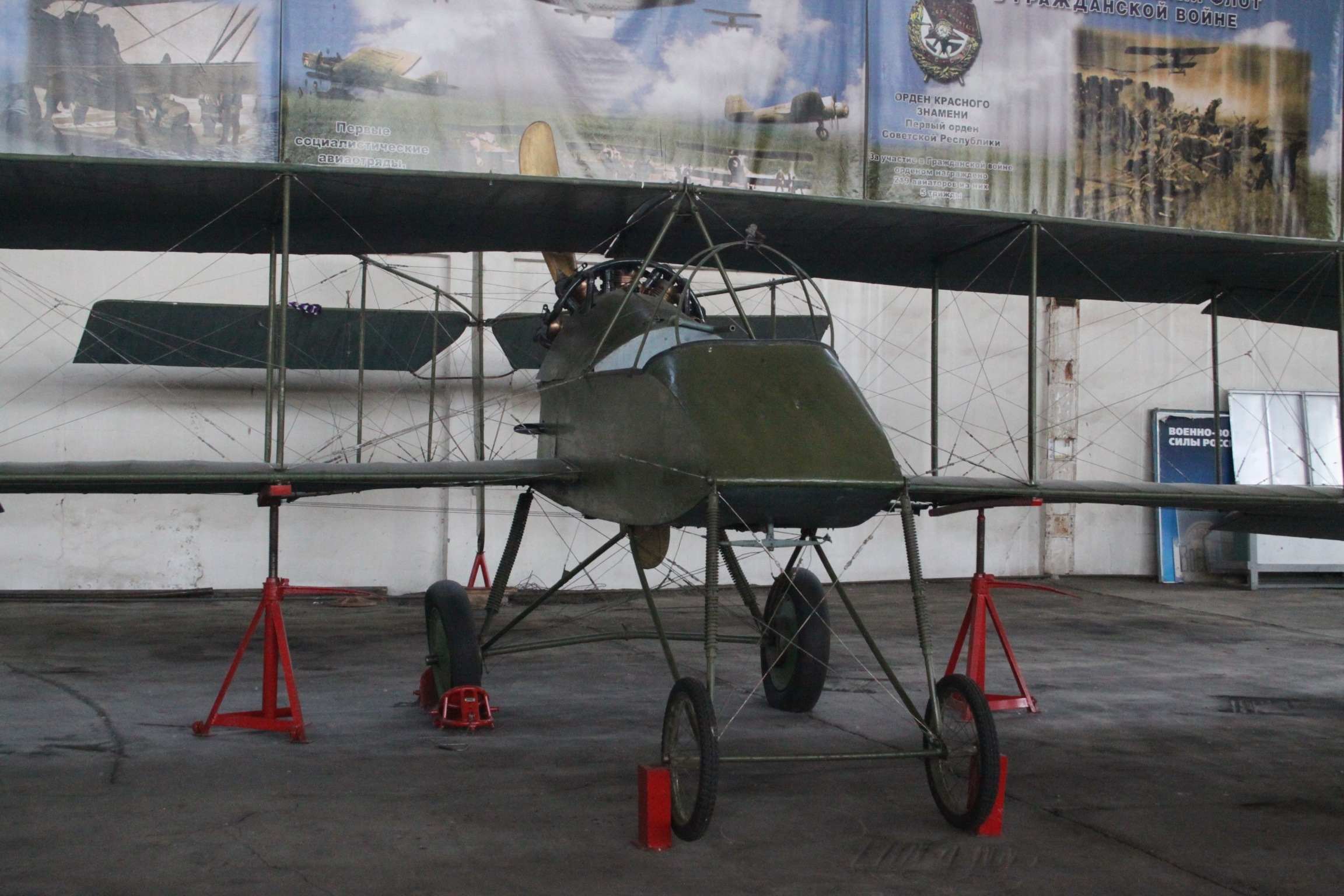
- An unmarked Voisin V at the Central Air Force Museum in Monino, Russia

General information
- Type: Bomber
- National origin: France
- Manufacturer: Société Anonyme des Aéroplanes G. Voisin
- Number built: 350

History
- Developed from: Voisin III
- Developed into: Voisin VII

The Voisin V was a French pusher-type bomber aircraft of World War I.

== Development history ==
The Voisin III had proved a successful bomber, but its payload was limited by the Salmson M9 engine, which produced only 120-hp. With an already identified need to develop a heavier and more powerful aircraft to deliver a larger bomb-load, an interim measure was taken to produce a Voisin III with a 150-hp Salmson P9 engine.

At the same time, the airframe was strengthened and the central nacelle streamlined. The new engine was placed on a raised platform to provide clearance for the propeller and was angled to provide downward thrust. In addition, the landing gear was strengthened and the wing chord was increased from the roots to the wing tips.

The new aircraft was given the STAé designation Voisin V, while the factory designation was Voisin LAS. The S stood for surélevé (raised) which indicated the raised engine mount. The previous Type III variant had an exhaust system which permitted fumes to escape freely; the Type V incorporated a more effective system of twin exhaust pipes.

One Voisin V was transformed into a twin-engine aircraft in 1916 by adding a second Salmson in the front of the fuselage driving a tractor propeller. It is believed that the intention was to test a possible twin pusher and tractor propeller configuration for a new bomber planned by Voisin. The twin-engine Voisin V first flew in early 1916 but appears not to have been developed further.

The first Voisin V came into operational use in 1915 and not long after replaced the Voisin III on the production lines. However, the Voisins 150 hp (as they were referred to at the Western Front) were held in low regard by their crews. Despite the more powerful engine, the Voisin V's payload was only marginally better and the maximum speed was only 13 km/h faster.

== Operational use ==
Approximately 350 Voisin Vs were built, and these served alongside the Voisin IIIs in front-line escadrilles during 1915 and well into 1916.

In common with other Voisin variants, the pusher engine configuration of the Type V resulted in the aircraft being defenceless against attacks from the rear. However this variant continued the operational use of all of the types both in training and bombing roles.

== Variants ==
- Voisin LA: Company designation for initial production variant.
- Voisin LAS: Company designation for improved III and V versions, with raised (soulevé) engine.
- Voisin LB & LBS: Company designations for 37 mm (1.457 in) cannon armed variants, with staggered wings to offset extra nose weight.
- Voisin III: Government (STAé) designation for LA and LAS versions.
- Voisin IV: Government (STAé) designation for 37 mm (1.457 in) cannon armed variants, with staggered wings.
- Voisin V: Government (STAé) designation for development of III with full chord lower wing, also designated LAS by Voisin.

== Operators ==
Argentina

- Aviación de Ejército - one aircraft

France

- French Air Force

Russia

- Imperial Russian Air Service

Switzerland

- Swiss Air Force - One aircraft only.

== Specifications ==
Data from Taylor 1969, p133

General characteristics

- Crew: 2
- Length: 9.6203 m (31 ft 6.75 in)
- Wingspan: 15.964 m (52 ft 4.5 in)
- Height: 3.81 m (12 ft 6 in)
- Max takeoff weight: 1,470 kg (3,240 lb)
- Powerplant: 1 × Salmson (Canton-Unné) P9 9-cyl. water-cooled radial piston engine, 110 kW (150 hp)

Performance

- Maximum speed: 119 km/h (74 mph, 64 kn)
- Combat range: 249 km (155 mi, 135 nmi)
- Service ceiling: 3,500 m (11,500 ft)
