= Dux Factory =

Aircraft plant in Moscow, also produced motorcycles, cars, airships

PAO Dux
- Company type: AO
- Industry: Aerospace
- Founded: 1893
- Fate: Nationalized, later reinstated as a private company
- Headquarters: Moscow, Russia
- Key people: Julius Meller, Mukhtar Mejidov
- Products: Aircraft components, Missiles, Military aircraft

Original Dux logo. Below is written - Bicycles, Motoreves, Railcars, Airplanes

Dux (Russian: Завод «Дукс», romanized: Zavod "Duks") was a bicycle/automobile/aircraft factory in Moscow, Russia before and during World War I.

The factory was founded in 1893. The name comes from the Latin word dux (leader). Julius Möller (also written Juli Meller) was owner of the factory, which was primarily focused on the building of French aircraft designs.

== History ==
=== Plant #1 ===
The factory was established in Moscow in 1893 as a bicycle production plant. Production shifted to aircraft manufacturing in 1910. During World War I Dux produced Morane-Saulnier G, Voisin L, Voisin LAS, Nieuport 17, Nieuport 24, Farman family of aircraft including models IV, VII, XVI, and XXX, as well as a large number of military bicycles.

After the October Revolution. the plant was named "Aircraft Plant #1 named after OSOAVIAKHIM" or "GAZ No. 1" (In this context, GAZ stands for Gosudarstvenny Aviatsionny Zavod, State Aircraft Plant). Farmans and Nieuports were left in production.

In 1923 a design bureau was established at the plant, headed by Nikolai Nikolaevich Polikarpov; this would later become known as the Polikarpov Design Bureau. Production models included I-5, I-15, I-15bis, I-153, I-16, R-5, and R-Zet aircraft. Polikarpov also built Airco DH.9A (which later became Polikarpov R-1/Polikarpov R-2) and Airco DH.4 during the 1920s and 1930s.

Plant #1 produced the MiG-3 before evacuation in October 1941. Plant #1 was evacuated to Samara in 1941, becoming the Kuibyshev Aviation Plant. In 1958 it shifted its production to rockets, and became known as the Samara Progress plant.

=== Plant #30 ===
Plant #30 was established in 1939 in Dubna. In December 1941 it was relocated to the former site of Plant #1, where it manufactured the Ilyushin Il-2. In 1950 it merged with Plant #381, to produce the Il-28 in larger volumes. In 1953 Lukhovitsy Machine Building Plant was established as a subsidiary of the plant.

Plant #30 became known as the Znamya Truda Machine-Building Plant in 1965, and as the Moscow Aircraft Production Organisation in 1973.

The MiG-29 was put in production. Civil programs include MiG-AT, T-101, T-411, and Aviatika MAI-890 aircraft. After this, the following aircraft were produced: Su-9, Yak-25, Il-14, Il-18 with modifications, MiG-21, and MiG-23.

=== Plant #32 ===
Plant #32 was established in 1932, when it was separated from Plant #1. In 1941 it was evacuated to Kirov, becoming the Kirov Machine-Building Plant in 1960 and the Vyatka Machine Building Enterprise AVITEK in the 1990s.

=== Plant #39 ===
Plant #39 produced the DB-3F before evacuation in October 1941. Plant #39 was moved to Irkutsk in 1941, where it was merged with the Irkutsk Machine-Building Plant, ultimately establishing the Irkutsk Aviation Plant.

=== Plant #43 ===
Plant #43 was established in 1893. Between 1963 and 1992 it was known as the Moscow Kommunar Machine-Building Plant. It focuses on air-to-air missile production and some aircraft sub-components. In 1992 it became the Open Joint Stock Company Dux.

=== Plant #381 ===
Plant #381 produced the Lavochkin La-5 and later the La-7. Plant #381 also produced the Il-12, a small series of I-250, and the first 75 MiG-15s. In 1950 it was merged into Plant #30.

== Aircraft ==
The majority of types built by Dux were French and other Western aircraft designs. The first aircraft made was a licensed Farman IV with an ENV engine, which made its first flight on 18 August 1910. From there, in addition to copies, some improvements were designed for existing models. The first of these was a Farman VII in 1912 with some improvements that were put into production. A more ambitious project was the Dux Meller I which combined a Bleriot main fuselage with a Farman XV nacelle added, all driven by a 100 hp Gnome-Rhone in pusher configuration. A modified Farman XVI was later produced under the name Dux Meller II and flown in 1913. The following Dux Meller III was a failed attempt to produce a single-engine twin-propeller chain-driven monoplane. Further work went into the Dux No 2 but this was also a failure.

Summary of aircraft built by Dux
| Model name | First flight | Number built | Type |
|---|---|---|---|
| Dux Meller I | | | |
| Dux Meller II | 1913 | | |
| Dux Meller III | | | |
| Dux No 2 | | | |

== See also ==
- List of aircraft (C-D)

== Bibliography ==
- Gunston, Bill (1995). The Osprey Encyclopedia of Russian Aircraft 1875–1995. Osprey. p. 2. ISBN 978-1855324053.
