= Voisin IV =

WWI French bomber aircraft

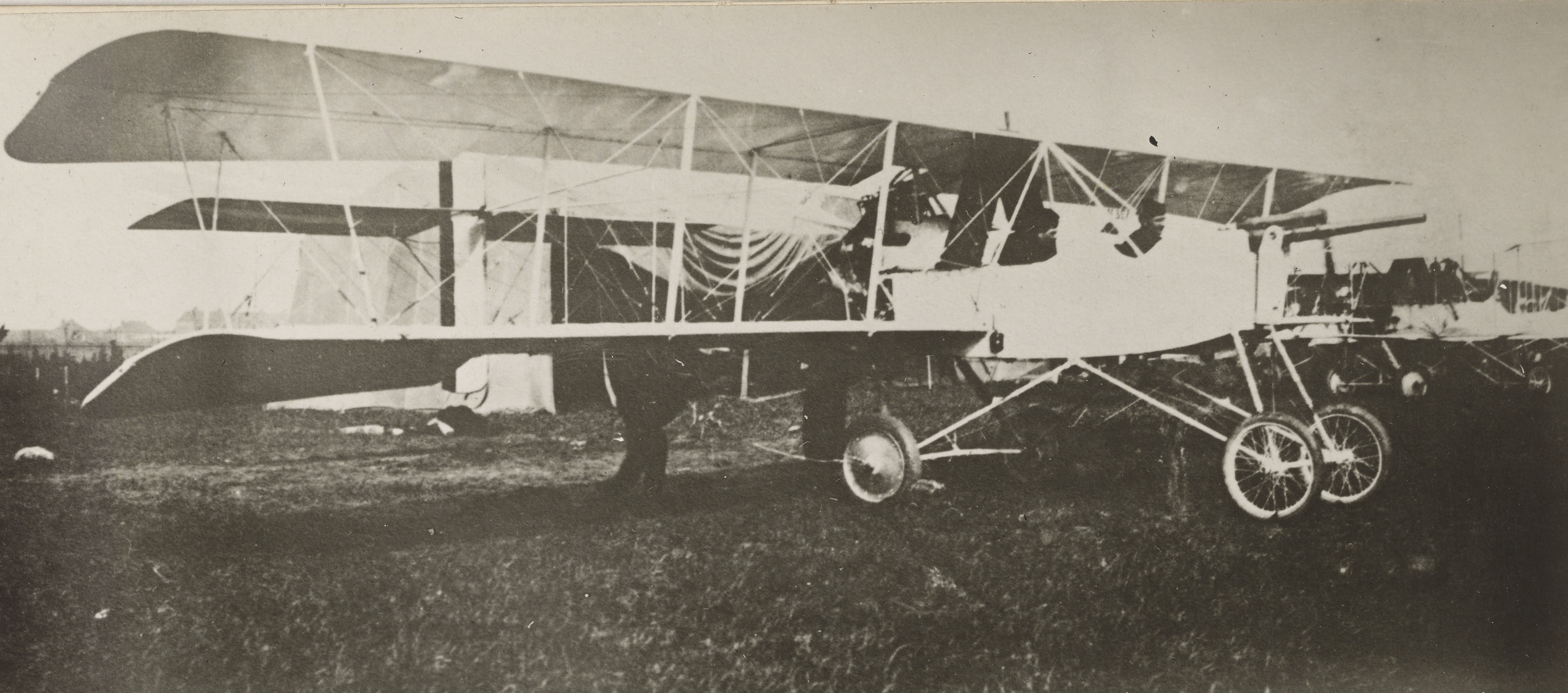
- Side view of Voisin IV

General information
- Type: Bomber
- Manufacturer: Voisin
- Designer: Gabriel Voisin
- Primary user: Aéronautique Militaire
- Number built: 200

History
- Introduction date: 1915
- First flight: 1915

The Voisin IV was a French two-seat bomber and ground attack aircraft of World War I.

== Design ==
The Voisin IV was a biplane with a single engine in a pusher configuration, developed by Voisin in 1915 with staggered wings. It differed from earlier Voisin combat aircraft designs in having a mounted 37 mm (1.5 in) or 47 mm (1.9 in) cannon.

== Variants ==
- Voisin LB : Two-seat bomber, ground-attack biplane equipped with a cannon.
- Voisin LBS : Improved version, with the engine raised compared to the original design.

== Operators ==
France

- Aéronautique Militaire

== Specifications ==
Data from Parmentier

General characteristics

- Crew: 2
- Length: 10.28 m (33 ft 9 in)
- Wingspan: 14.74 m (48 ft 4 in)
- Height: 3.8 m (12 ft 6 in)
- Wing area: 49.66 m^{2} (534.5 sq ft)
- Empty weight: 1,122 kg (2,474 lb)
- Gross weight: 1,400 kg (3,086 lb)
- Powerplant: 1 × Salmson 9R 9-cylinder water-cooled radial piston engine, 89 kW (120 hp)
- Propellers: 2-bladed fixed-pitch pusher propeller

Performance

- Maximum speed: 96 km/h (60 mph, 52 kn) at 2,000 m (6,600 ft)
- Service ceiling: 2,000 m (6,600 ft)

Armament

- Guns: 1 × 37 mm (1.5 in) Hotchkiss Model 1885

== Bibliography ==
- Bruce, J.M (1982). The aeroplanes of the Royal Flying Corps (Military Wing). London: Putnam. ISBN 0-370-30084-X.
- Guttman, Jon; et al. (2009). Pusher aces of World War 1. Oxford: Osprey. ISBN 978-1-84603-417-6.
- Klaauw, Bart van der (March–April 1999). "Unexpected Windfalls: Accidentally or Deliberately, More than 100 Aircraft 'arrived' in Dutch Territory During the Great War". Air Enthusiast (80): 54–59. ISSN 0143-5450.
