= 2023 AMA Supercross Championship =

American motorcycle sporting event

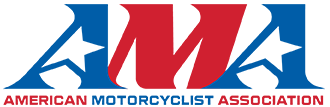
- Organizer: American Motorcyclist Association, Feld Entertainment (except Daytona), NASCAR Holdings, Inc. (Daytona)
- Discipline: Supercross
- Duration: January – May 2023
- Races: 17
- TV partners: NBC Sports (NBC, USA Network, CNBC, Peacock)

Champions
- 450cc: (United States) Chase Sexton
- 250cc West: (Australia) Jett Lawrence
- 250cc East: (Australia) Hunter Lawrence

AMA Supercross Championship
- ← 2022 2024 →

The 2023 AMA Supercross Championship was the 50th season of off-road stadium motorcycle racing in the United States. Comprising 17 rounds, the series ran from January until May, crowning supercross champions in both the 250cc and 450cc classes, concluding with the Salt Lake City round on May 13.

The 2023 season was the first 450cc supercross championship for Chase Sexton. This was also the first 4 stroke, 450cc championship for Honda and the first time in 20 years that Honda won the premier class of supercross since Ricky Carmichael in 2003

The championship formed the first part of the inaugural SuperMotocross World Championship.

== Schedule and results ==
2023 Monster Energy AMA Supercross Championship
Round (250 East/West)	Date	Location	Stadium	450cc Winner	250cc Winner
1 (W)	January 7	(California) Anaheim	Angel Stadium	(United States) Eli Tomac	(Australia) Jett Lawrence
2 (W)	January 21	(California) San Diego	Snapdragon Stadium	(United States) Eli Tomac	(Australia) Jett Lawrence
3 (W)	January 28	(California) Anaheim 2	Angel Stadium	(United States) Chase Sexton	(United States) Levi Kitchen
4 (E)	February 4	(Texas) Houston	NRG Stadium	(United States) Eli Tomac	(Australia) Hunter Lawrence
5 (E)	February 11	(Florida) Tampa Bay	Raymond James Stadium	(United States) Cooper Webb	(Australia) Hunter Lawrence
6 (W)	February 18	(California) Oakland	Ring Central Coliseum	(United States) Eli Tomac	(Australia) Jett Lawrence
7 (E)	February 25	(Texas) Arlington	AT&T Stadium	(United States) Cooper Webb	(United States) Nate Thrasher
8 (E)	March 4	(Florida) Daytona	Daytona International Speedway	(United States) Eli Tomac	(Australia) Hunter Lawrence
9 (E)	March 11	(Indiana) Indianapolis	Lucas Oil Stadium	(Germany) Ken Roczen	(Australia) Hunter Lawrence
10 (E)	March 18	(Michigan) Detroit	Ford Field	(United States) Chase Sexton	(Australia) Hunter Lawrence
11 (W)	March 25	(Washington (state)) Seattle	Lumen Field	(United States) Eli Tomac	(Australia) Jett Lawrence
12 (W)	April 8	(Arizona) Glendale	State Farm Stadium	(United States) Eli Tomac	(Australia) Jett Lawrence
13 (E)	April 15	(Georgia (U.S. state)) Hampton	Atlanta Motor Speedway	(United States) Chase Sexton	(Australia) Hunter Lawrence
14 (E/W)	April 22	(New Jersey) East Rutherford	MetLife Stadium	(United States) Justin Barcia	(United Kingdom) Max Anstie
15 (E)	April 29	(Tennessee) Nashville	Nissan Stadium	(United States) Chase Sexton	(Australia) Hunter Lawrence
16 (W)	May 6	(Colorado) Denver	Empower Field at Mile High	(United States) Chase Sexton	(United States) RJ Hampshire
17 (E/W)	May 13	(Utah) Salt Lake City	Rice-Eccles Stadium	(United States) Chase Sexton	(Australia) Jett Lawrence

=== Stadium locations ===
2023 AMA Supercross Championship locations

== 450 SX ==
=== Entry list ===
Team	Constructor	No	Rider	Rounds
Monster Energy Star Racing Yamaha	Yamaha	1	(United States) Eli Tomac	1–16
Monster Energy Star Racing Yamaha	Yamaha	14	(France) Dylan Ferrandis	1–4, 8
Monster Energy Star Racing Yamaha	Yamaha	32	(United States) Justin Cooper	4–8
Red Bull KTM Factory Racing USA	KTM	2	(United States) Cooper Webb	1–15
Red Bull KTM Factory Racing USA	KTM	7	(United States) Aaron Plessinger	1–13, 17
Red Bull KTM Factory Racing USA	KTM	25	(France) Marvin Musquin	1
Monster Energy Kawasaki	Kawasaki	9	(United States) Adam Cianciarulo	1–6, 9–17
Monster Energy Kawasaki	Kawasaki	21	(United States) Jason Anderson	1–15
Twisted Tea Suzuki Presented by Progressive Insurance	Suzuki	11	(United States) Kyle Chisholm	1–7, 9–17
Twisted Tea Suzuki Presented by Progressive Insurance	Suzuki	12	(United States) Shane McElrath	All
Progressive Insurance ECSTAR Suzuki	Suzuki	94	(Germany) Ken Roczen	All
Fire Power Honda Racing	Honda	15	(United Kingdom) Dean Wilson	All
Rick Ware Racing	Kawasaki	17	(United States) Joey Savatgy	1–7
Team Honda HRC	Honda	23	(United States) Chase Sexton	All
Team Honda HRC	Honda	45	(United States) Colt Nichols	1–8, 12–16
Rockstar Energy Husqvarna Factory Racing USA	Husqvarna	24	(United States) RJ Hampshire	8–9
Rockstar Energy Husqvarna Factory Racing USA	Husqvarna	27	(United States) Malcolm Stewart	1–2
Rockstar Energy Husqvarna Factory Racing USA	Husqvarna	28	(United States) Christian Craig	1–11
Manluk Rock River Yamaha	Yamaha	44	(United States) Benny Bloss	1, 3–15
Manluk Rock River Yamaha	Yamaha	78	(United States) Grant Harlan	All
Team Tedder Monster Energy Mountain Motorsports	KTM	46	(United States) Justin Hill	All
Team Tedder Monster Energy Mountain Motorsports	KTM	751	(United States) Josh Hill	All
Madd Parts Kawasaki	Kawasaki	47	(Sweden) Fredrik Norén	All
Madd Parts Kawasaki	Kawasaki	73	(United States) John Short	1–10, 12–15
Madd Parts Kawasaki	Kawasaki	282	(United States) Theodore Pauli	1–9
Troy Lee Designs Gas Gas Factory Racing	Gas Gas	51	(United States) Justin Barcia	1–15
JSR Motorsports	Gas Gas	60	(United States) Justin Starling	1–4, 6–17
TiLube Storm Lake Honda Racing	Honda	66	(United States) Henry Miller	2–3
TiLube Storm Lake Honda Racing	Honda	460	(United States) Michael Hicks	16
Partzilla PRMX Kawasaki	Kawasaki	68	(United States) Cade Clason	1–11, 13–17
Partzilla PRMX Kawasaki	Kawasaki	170	(United States) Devin Simonson	12–17
Partzilla PRMX Kawasaki	Kawasaki	219	(United States) Chase Marquier	All
Partzilla PRMX Kawasaki	Kawasaki	500	(Canada) Julien Benek	7–8
Partzilla PRMX Kawasaki	Kawasaki	952	(France) Ludovic Macler	2–3
OnlyFans Kawasaki	Kawasaki	74	(United States) Logan Karnow	All
Team Solitaire Heartbeat Hot Sauce Yamaha	Yamaha	76	(Germany) Dominique Thury	17
Team Solitaire Heartbeat Hot Sauce Yamaha	Yamaha	83	(Canada) Cole Thompson	4–5
Tank Masters Red Line Oil Next Level KTM	KTM	80	(United States) Kevin Moranz	All
Rides Unlimited Rocky Mountain ATV/MC Racing	KTM	89	(United States) Kaeden Amerine	7–9, 15
Rides Unlimited Rocky Mountain ATV/MC Racing	KTM	364	(United States) Chad Saultz	5–6, 8–11, 14–15
Rides Unlimited Rocky Mountain ATV/MC Racing	KTM	604	(United States) Max Miller	4–5, 8–9, 15
Silverback Racing	Gas Gas	90	(United States) Tristan Lane	1–7, 12–17
Valley Ford Truck Dean Hushon Insulation	Honda	91	(United States) Jeremy Hand	14
Motorsport Hillsboro	KTM	97	(United States) Devin Harriman	7
	Gas Gas	98	(Australia) Geran Stapleton	17
Heritage 1855 Safe Inspect	KTM	105	(Australia) Hayden Mellross	12
Smartop MotoConcepts Honda Racing	Honda	111	(Venezuela) Anthony Rodriguez	12, 16–17
Smartop MotoConcepts Honda Racing	Honda	160	(United States) Cole Seely	11–12
3D Racing Yamaha	Yamaha	116	(United States) TJ Albright	16
Nicholas Nisbet Realty	Honda	117	(United States) Nicholas Nisbet	17
RRCZ KTM Team	KTM	118	(United States) Cheyenne Harmon	13–16
Team TPJ	Gas Gas	119	(United States) Logan Boye	2–3, 14
Team Faith	Kawasaki	120	(United States) Todd Bannister	4–5, 7–9, 12, 15, 17
Team Faith	Kawasaki	467	(United States) Isaiah Goodman	8–9, 12–13, 15
Smell Good Athlete	Yamaha	121	(United States) Chris Howell	15–17
Red Research Group	Honda	125	(United States) Luke Neese	16
CMS Racing R-Jerky Gasper Transportation	Yamaha	126	(United States) RJ Wageman	14, 17
Ez-Line Ronnie Prado Company	KTM	129	(United States) Lane Shaw	1–5, 7–10, 12–16
	Yamaha	132	(United States) Nick Desiderio	13–15
DMP Motorsports	Yamaha	138	(United States) David Pulley Jr.	6, 11–12, 16
Swapmoto Live	Yamaha	140	(United States) Alex Ray	1–5, 9–10, 17
	Kawasaki	141	(United States) Richard Taylor	1–3, 6, 11–17
Fenestella Riddles Motorsports	KTM	146	(United States) Brandon Marley	1–2, 4
The Pit Enterprise	Kawasaki	147	(United States) Ryan Carlson	11–12, 17
BRS Team Next Level Racing	Yamaha	173	(United States) Hunter Schlosser	4–5, 7–10, 13, 15, 17
Ronnie Prado Company	Gas Gas	191	(United States) Curren Thurman	1–3, 16
	KTM	195	(United States) Blake Ashley	1–2
Clarke Mfg	Kawasaki	207	(United States) Rider Fisher	11
Adams & Sons HVAC Underdog Fantasy	Kawasaki	208	(United States) Logan Leitzel	1–3, 11–12
	Suzuki	281	(United States) Cory Carsten	13–14
	Yamaha	289	(United States) Robert Hailey	16
BWR Engines	Honda	299	(United States) Konnor Visger	16
Vickery Motosports	Kawasaki	311	(United States) Mitchell Gifford	16
	Kawasaki	351	(United States) Jack Rogers	14
LeMonds Motorsports	Yamaha	371	(United States) Dawson Ryker	13
	KTM	372	(United States) Hayden Hefner	14
TDMX Graphics	Honda	388	(United States) Brandon Ray	8–9
Marionville Powersports	KTM	410	(United States) Brandon Scharer	1–2
	Husqvarna	411	(United States) Scott Meshey	1, 7–9
	Yamaha	412	(United States) Jared Lesher	1–2, 4–5, 7–9, 13–14, 16–17
Mosites Motosports TrueMX	Kawasaki	437	(United States) Vincent Luhovey	5, 8–10
HEP Motorsports	Suzuki	446	(United States) Blaine Silveira	17
RJC Racing Kelly's Kawasaki	Kawasaki	447	(United States) Deven Raper	1–4, 7–17
TCD Racing	Yamaha	483	(United States) Bryton Carroll	14
Ronnie Prado Company	Kawasaki	501	(United States) Scotty Wennerstrom	1–14
Team BWR	Honda	503	(United States) McClellan Hile	17
	Honda	509	(United States) Alexander Nagy	1–3, 7–10, 14–15, 17
	Honda	511	(United States) Jace Kessler	14
	Kawasaki	512	(United States) Austin Cozadd	All
	Yamaha	517	(United States) Ty Freehill	7–8
Holeshot Motorsports	KTM	518	(Canada) Parker Eales	11
Psychic Motorsports	Kawasaki	519	(United States) Joshua Cartwright	All
VPE	Yamaha	538	(United States) Addison Emory	6, 11, 17
	Husqvarna	542	(United States) Johnnie Buller	1, 3, 6, 11–12
Junior Mecanique Plus	KTM	551	(Canada) Guillaume St-Cyr	4–5, 7–8
Lasting Impression Race Team	Honda	581	(United States) Kyle Bitterman	14–15
Ramsey Subaru	Honda	597	(United States) Mason Kerr	1–5, 7–17
	Gas Gas	606	(United States) Ronnie Stewart	5, 8, 13–14
KBR	Honda	636	(United States) Luke Kalaitzian	17
Alien Lab CBD Deft Family	Yamaha	637	(United States) Bobby Piazza	1–5, 7–10, 13, 15–16
Fanelli Equipment Repair	Gas Gas	645	(United States) Colby Copp	7–8, 13–17
	Gas Gas	672	(United States) Brandon Pederson	7–9
MotoSport Hillsboro	Husqvarna	726	(United States) Gared Steinke	1–3, 6, 11–12, 17
	Kawasaki	770	(United States) Doug Manhire	2, 6
Sorensen Racing	Honda	814	(United States) Deven Sorensen	8
Team ShredCo	Kawasaki	824	(United States) Carter Stephenson	5, 7–8
LTech BWR Honda	Honda	837	(United States) Bryson Gardner	1–3, 6, 11–12
Namura Invictus Speed Crew	Kawasaki	848	(Spain) Joan Cros	All
Storm Lake Honda	Honda	942	(United States) Deegan Hepp	16
The Mahoney's MX4Christ	Gas Gas	976	(United States) Josh Greco	4–17
Estate Jewellers Imperial Construction	KTM	995	(United States) Christopher Prebula	13–15, 17
Yankton Motorsports	Kawasaki	996	(United States) Preston Taylor	4, 7, 9–10, 12–17

=== Championship Standings ===
Pos	Rider	Bike	ANA (California)	SDI (California)	ANA (California)	HOU (Texas)	TAM (Florida)	OAK (California)	ARL (Texas)	DAY (Florida)	IND (Indiana)	DET (Michigan)	SEA (Washington (state))	GLE (Arizona)	HAM (Georgia (U.S. state))	EAR (New Jersey)	NAS (Tennessee)	DEN (Colorado)	SLC (Utah)	Points
1	(United States) Chase Sexton	Honda	3	5	1	2	2	3	2	3	10	1	5	2	1	4	1	1	1	372
2	(United States) Eli Tomac	Yamaha	1	1	6	1	5	1	3	1	8	3	1	1	5	2	2	22		339
3	(United States) Cooper Webb	KTM	2	2	4	5	1	2	1	2	3	2	2	4	4	5	DNQ			304
4	(Germany) Ken Roczen	Suzuki	5	4	3	8	4	11	5	7	1	5	6	5	3	3	3	2	22	304
5	(United States) Justin Barcia	Gas Gas	11	3	8	6	8	6	7	4	2	4	3	3	2	1	21			267
6	(United States) Jason Anderson	Kawasaki	7	7	2	3	6	5	4	5	5	9	4	10	21	12	6			242
7	(United States) Aaron Plessinger	KTM	8	9	7	4	3	4	6	9	4	13	7	7	6				2	236
8	(United States) Justin Hill	KTM	15	13	14	20	13	14	10	12	9	7	10	12	10	9	5	4	3	212
9	(United States) Adam Cianciarulo	Kawasaki	9	8	9	10	12	15			6	8	8	6	7	DNQ	8	3	4	210
10	(United Kingdom) Dean Wilson	Honda	14	14	13	12	15	12	11	11	12	21	11	9	8	10	7	6	5	200
11	(United States) Shane McElrath	Suzuki	DNQ	16	16	15	17	16	15	13	13	17	16	13	12	6	20	5	7	151
12	(United States) Christian Craig	Husqvarna	13	11	11	11	10	7	8	10	7	6	9							150
13	(United States) Josh Hill	KTM	18	DNQ	DNQ	DNQ	14	13	13	15	11	10	12	15	11	18	10	7	6	149
14	(United States) Colt Nichols	Honda	6	12	12	13	11	9	14	DNQ				8	9	16	4	21		141
15	(United States) Kyle Chisholm	Suzuki	DNQ	17	17	DNQ	19	18	16		14	22	18	11	14	13	9	8	14	112
16	(United States) Kevin Moranz	KTM	20	DNQ	22	14	18	20	18	DNQ	16	16	20	19	16	7	12	20	11	96
17	(United States) Justin Starling	Gas Gas	19	20	19	16	DNQ	DNQ	21	18	17	18	19	22	19	14	11	10	8	94
18	(United States) Grant Harlan	Yamaha	17	DNQ	DNQ	DNQ	21	DNQ	17	14	18	12	13	17	17	15	22	9	10	94
19	(United States) Benny Bloss	Yamaha	DNQ		18	22	16	17	12	16	DNQ	11	15	14	13	8	DNQ			91
20	(United States) Joey Savatgy	Kawasaki	10	10	10	9	9	8	20											85
21	(Sweden) Fredrik Norén	Kawasaki	21	19	15	DNQ	DNQ	22	DNQ	DNQ	15	19	14	16	15	11	DNQ	14	17	78
22	(United States) Justin Cooper	Yamaha				7	7	10	9	6										76
23	(United States) Joshua Cartwright	Kawasaki	DNQ	18	21	19	DNQ	21	19	17	19	14	17	21	18	DNQ	14	12	16	76
24	(United States) Cade Clason	Kawasaki	DNQ	DNQ	20	17	20	19	DNQ	20	20	12	22		22	19	19	13	12	64
25	(France) Dylan Ferrandis	Yamaha	4	6	5	21				DNQ										56
26	(United States) Tristan Lane	Gas Gas	DNQ	DNQ	DNQ	DNQ	DNQ	DNQ	DNQ					DNQ	DNQ	20	13	17	13	29
27	(United States) Devin Simonson	Kawasaki												DNQ	DNQ	22	17	16	9	28
28	(United States) Chase Marquier	Kawasaki	DNQ	DNQ	DNQ	DNQ	DNQ	DNQ	DNQ	21	DNQ	20	DNQ	DNQ	DNQ	17	16	DNQ	19	22
29	(United States) Logan Karnow	Kawasaki	DNQ	DNQ	DNQ	DNQ	DNQ	DNQ	22	22	22	DNQ	DNQ	DNQ	DNQ	DNQ	15	18	20	19
30	(United States) RJ Hampshire	Husqvarna								8	DNQ									15
31	(Venezuela) Anthony Rodriguez	Honda												20				11	DNQ	15
32	(United States) Malcolm Stewart	Husqvarna	16	15																15
33	(United States) John Short	Kawasaki	22	22	DNQ	18	22	DNQ	DNQ	19	DNQ	DNQ		DNQ	DNQ	DNQ	DNQ			12
34	(France) Marvin Musquin	KTM	12																	11
35	(United States) Hunter Schlosser	Yamaha				DNQ	DNQ		DNQ	DNQ	DNQ	DNQ			DNQ		DNQ		15	8
36	(United States) Michael Hicks	Honda																15		8
37	(United States) Cole Seely	Honda											21	18						7
38	(Spain) Joan Cros	Kawasaki	DNQ	DNQ	DNQ	DNQ	DNQ	DNQ	DNQ	DNQ	21	DNQ	DNQ	DNQ	DNQ	DNQ	DNQ	DNQ	18	7
39	(United States) Max Miller	KTM				DNQ	DNQ			DNQ	DNQ						18			5
40	(United States) Jared Lesher	Yamaha	DNQ	DNQ		DNQ	DNQ		DNQ	DNQ	DNQ				20	DNQ		DNQ	21	5
41	(United States) Lane Shaw	Gas Gas	DNQ	DNQ	DNQ	DNQ	DNQ		DNQ	DNQ	DNQ	DNQ		DNQ	DNQ	DNQ	DNQ	19		4
42	(United States) Jeremy Hand	Honda														21				2
43	(United States) Alex Ray	Yamaha	DNQ	21	DNQ	DNQ	DNQ				DNQ	DNQ							DNQ	2
	(United States) Austin Cozadd	Kawasaki	DNQ	DNQ	DNQ	DNQ	DNQ	DNQ	DNQ	DNQ	DNQ	DNQ	DNQ	DNQ	DNQ	DNQ	DNQ	DNQ	DNQ	0
	(United States) Mason Kerr	Honda	DNQ	DNQ	DNQ	DNQ	DNQ		DNQ	DNQ	DNQ	DNQ	DNQ	DNQ	DNQ	DNQ	DNQ	DNQ	DNQ	0
	(United States) Deven Raper	Kawasaki	DNQ	DNQ	DNQ	DNQ			DNQ	DNQ	DNQ	DNQ	DNQ	DNQ	DNQ	DNQ	DNQ	DNQ	DNQ	0
	(United States) Scotty Wennerstrom	Kawasaki	DNQ	DNQ	DNQ	DNQ	DNQ	DNQ	DNQ	DNQ	DNQ	DNQ	DNQ	DNQ	DNQ	DNQ				0
	(United States) Josh Greco	Gas Gas				DNQ	DNQ	DNQ	DNQ	DNQ	DNQ	DNQ	DNQ	DNQ	DNQ	DNQ	DNQ	DNQ	DNQ	0
	(United States) Bobby Piazza	Yamaha	DNQ	DNQ	DNQ	DNQ	DNQ		DNQ	DNQ	DNQ	DNQ			DNQ		DNQ	DNQ		0
	(United States) Richard Taylor	Kawasaki	DNQ	DNQ	DNQ			DNQ					DNQ	DNQ	DNQ	DNQ	DNQ	DNQ	DNQ	0
	(United States) Alexander Nagy	Honda	DNQ	DNQ	DNQ				DNQ	DNQ	DNQ	DNQ				DNQ	DNQ		DNQ	0
	(United States) Preston Taylor	Kawasaki				DNQ			DNQ		DNQ	DNQ		DNQ	DNQ	DNQ	DNQ	DNQ	DNQ	0
	(United States) Theodore Pauli	Kawasaki	DNQ	DNQ	DNQ	DNQ	DNQ	DNQ	DNQ	DNQ	DNQ									0
	(United States) Todd Bannister	Kawasaki				DNQ	DNQ		DNQ	DNQ	DNQ			DNQ			DNQ		DNQ	0
	(United States) Chad Saultz	KTM					DNQ	DNQ		DNQ	DNQ	DNQ	DNQ			DNQ	DNQ			0
	(United States) Gared Steinke	Husqvarna	DNQ	DNQ	DNQ			DNQ					DNQ	DNQ					DNQ	0
	(United States) Colby Copp	Gas Gas							DNQ	DNQ					DNQ	DNQ	DNQ	DNQ	DNQ	0
	(United States) Bryson Gardner	Honda	DNQ	DNQ	DNQ			DNQ					DNQ	DNQ						0
	(United States) Logan Leitzel	Kawasaki	DNQ	DNQ	DNQ								DNQ	DNQ						0
	(United States) Johnnie Buller	Husqvarna	DNQ		DNQ			DNQ					DNQ	DNQ						0
	(United States) Isaiah Goodman	Kawasaki								DNQ	DNQ			DNQ	DNQ		DNQ			0
	(United States) Curren Thurman	Gas Gas	DNQ	DNQ	DNQ													DNQ		0
	(United States) Scott Meshey	Husqvarna	DNQ						DNQ	DNQ	DNQ									0
	(Canada) Guillaume St-Cyr	KTM				DNQ	DNQ		DNQ	DNQ										0
	(United States) Vincent Luhovey	Kawasaki					DNQ			DNQ	DNQ	DNQ								0
	(United States) Ronnie Stewart	Gas Gas					DNQ			DNQ					DNQ	DNQ				0
	(United States) David Pulley Jr.	Yamaha						DNQ					DNQ	DNQ				DNQ		0
	(United States) Kaeden Amerine	KTM							DNQ	DNQ	DNQ						DNQ			0
	(United States) Cheyenne Harmon	KTM													DNQ	DNQ	DNQ	DNQ		0
	(United States) Christopher Prebula	KTM													DNQ	DNQ	DNQ		DNQ	0
	(United States) Brandon Marley	KTM	DNQ	DNQ		DNQ														0
	(United States) Logan Boye	Gas Gas		DNQ	DNQ											DNQ				0
	(United States) Carter Stephenson	Kawasaki					DNQ		DNQ	DNQ										0
	(United States) Addison Emory	Yamaha						DNQ					DNQ						DNQ	0
	(United States) Brandon Pederson	Gas Gas							DNQ	DNQ	DNQ									0
	(United States) Ryan Carlson	Kawasaki											DNQ	DNQ					DNQ	0
	(United States) Nick Desiderio	Yamaha													DNQ	DNQ	DNQ			0
	(United States) Chris Howell	Yamaha															DNQ	DNQ	DNQ	0
	(United States) Brandon Scharer	KTM	DNQ	DNQ																0
	(United States) Blake Ashley	KTM	DNQ	DNQ																0
	(France) Ludovic Macler	Kawasaki		DNQ	DNQ															0
	(United States) Henry Miller	Honda		DNQ	DNQ															0
	(United States) Doug Manhire	Kawasaki		DNQ				DNQ												0
	(Canada) Cole Thompson	Yamaha				DNQ	DNQ													0
	(Canada) Julien Benek	Kawasaki							DNQ	DNQ										0
	(United States) Ty Freehill	Yamaha							DNQ	DNQ										0
	(United States) Brandon Ray	Honda								DNQ	DNQ									0
	(United States) Cory Carsten	Suzuki													DNQ	DNQ				0
	(United States) Kyle Bitterman	Honda														DNQ	DNQ			0
	(United States) RJ Wageman	Yamaha														DNQ			DNQ	0
	(United States) Devin Harriman	KTM							DNQ											0
	(United States) Devin Sorensen	Honda								DNQ										0
	(Canada) Parker Eales	KTM											DNQ							0
	(United States) Rider Fisher	Kawasaki											DNQ							0
	(Australia) Hayden Mellross	KTM												DNQ						0
	(United States) Dawson Ryker	Yamaha													DNQ					0
	(United States) Jack Rogers	Kawasaki														DNQ				0
	(United States) Bryton Carroll	Yamaha														DNQ				0
	(United States) Jace Kessler	Honda														DNQ				0
	(United States) Hayden Hefner	KTM														DNQ				0
	(United States) TJ Albright	Yamaha																DNQ		0
	(United States) Robert Hailey	Yamaha																DNQ		0
	(United States) Deegan Hepp	Honda																DNQ		0
	(United States) Luke Neese	Honda																DNQ		0
	(United States) Mitchell Gifford	Kawasaki																DNQ		0
	(United States) Konnor Visger	Honda																DNQ		0
	(United States) Luke Kalaitzian	Honda																	DNQ	0
	(Germany) Dominique Thury	Yamaha																	DNQ	0
	(United States) Blaine Silveira	Suzuki																	DNQ	0
	(United States) McClellan Hile	Honda																	DNQ	0
	(Australia) Geran Stapleton	Gas Gas																	DNQ	0
	(United States) Nicholas Nisbet	Honda																	DNQ	0
Pos	Rider	Bike	ANA (California)	SDI (California)	ANA (California)	HOU (Texas)	TAM (Florida)	OAK (California)	ARL (Texas)	DAY (Florida)	IND (Indiana)	DET (Michigan)	SEA (Washington (state))	GLE (Arizona)	HAM (Georgia (U.S. state))	EAR (New Jersey)	NAS (Tennessee)	DEN (Colorado)	SLC (Utah)	Points

== 250 SX West ==
=== Entry list ===
Team	Constructor	No	Rider	Rounds
Team Honda HRC	Honda	18	(Australia) Jett Lawrence	All
Rockstar Energy Husqvarna Factory Racing USA	Husqvarna	24	(United States) RJ Hampshire	All
Troy Lee Designs Gas Gas Factory Racing	Gas Gas	33	(United States) Pierce Brown	1–7
Red Bull KTM Factory Racing USA	KTM	34	(United States) Max Vohland	All
Monster Energy Star Racing Yamaha	Yamaha	40	(United States) Stilez Robertson	1–6
Monster Energy Star Racing Yamaha	Yamaha	43	(United States) Levi Kitchen	All
AEO Powersports KTM Racing	KTM	41	(United States) Derek Kelley	All
AEO Powersports KTM Racing	KTM	42	(United States) Joshua Varize	1–3, 5–7
Monster Energy Pro Circuit Kawasaki	Kawasaki	48	(United States) Cameron McAdoo	1–5
Monster Energy Pro Circuit Kawasaki	Kawasaki	52	(United States) Carson Mumford	5–9
Monster Energy Pro Circuit Kawasaki	Kawasaki	55	(United States) Austin Forkner	1
Smartop MotoConcepts Honda Racing	Honda	49	(United States) Mitchell Oldenburg	1–6, 8–9
Smartop MotoConcepts Honda Racing	Honda	111	(Venezuela) Anthony Rodriguez	1–5
BarX Suzuki	Suzuki	53	(United States) Derek Drake	1–2, 4–9
BarX Suzuki	Suzuki	59	(United States) Robbie Wageman	All
BarX Suzuki	Suzuki	81	(United States) Ty Masterpool	1–2
BarX Suzuki	Suzuki	100	(Australia) Matt Moss	4, 6
BarX Suzuki	Suzuki	410	(United States) Brandon Scharer	3–7
Muc-Off FXR ClubMX Yamaha Racing	Yamaha	56	(Brazil) Enzo Lopes	All
Muc-Off FXR ClubMX Yamaha Racing	Yamaha	69	(United States) Phil Nicoletti	1–4
Team Solitaire Heartbeat Hot Sauce Yamaha	Yamaha	76	(Germany) Dominique Thury	1–8
Team Solitaire Heartbeat Hot Sauce Yamaha	Yamaha	83	(Canada) Cole Thompson	All
Revo Grindstone Kawasaki	Kawasaki	79	(New Zealand) Dylan Walsh	1–5
OverStock Vehicles AJE Motorsports	Gas Gas	84	(United States) Mitchell Harrison	All
OverStock Vehicles AJE Motorsports	Gas Gas	93	(United States) Jerry Robin	1–3, 5–8
OverStock Vehicles AJE Motorsports	Gas Gas	981	(United States) Austin Politelli	All
Progressive Insurance ECSTAR Suzuki	Suzuki	85	(United States) Dilan Schwartz	All
Rides Unlimited Rocky Mountain ATV/MC Racing	KTM	89	(United States) Kaeden Amerine	All
Rides Unlimited Rocky Mountain ATV/MC Racing	KTM	364	(United States) Chad Saultz	1–3, 8–9
Rides Unlimited Rocky Mountain ATV/MC Racing	KTM	604	(United States) Max Miller	All
Motosport Hillsboro	KTM	97	(United States) Devin Harriman	1–4
	Gas Gas	98	(Australia) Geran Stapleton	1–6, 8
Fire Power Honda Racing	Honda	102	(Australia) Wilson Todd	1–2
Nicholas Nisbet Realty	Honda	117	(United States) Nicholas Nisbet	1–6, 8
Team Faith	Kawasaki	120	(United States) Todd Bannister	1–3, 8
Smell Good Athlete Integrity Electric	Yamaha	121	(United States) Chris Howell	1–6
Palmer Compound	Honda	123	(United States) Kayden Palmer	1–2
CMS Racing R-Jerky Gasper Transportation	Yamaha	126	(United States) RJ Wageman	1–6, 8
The Pit Enterprise	Kawasaki	147	(United States) Ryan Carlson	1–4, 8
D&D Racing Kawasaki Mexico	Kawasaki	158	(Mexico) Tre Fierro	1–3, 5–6, 8
Concrete Plants Inc.	Honda	162	(United States) Maxwell Sanford	1–6
BRS Team Next Level Racing	Yamaha	173	(United States) Hunter Schlosser	1–8
	Kawasaki	198	(United States) Jayce Baldwin	2, 4
Epcon Partners	Yamaha	246	(United States) Chance Blackburn	1–5, 8
	Kawasaki	259	(United States) Luis Macias	1, 8
	Gas Gas	260	(United Kingdom) Dylan Woodcock	1–3
ERA Moto	Gas Gas	271	(United States) Patrick Evans	6
Somnium Bobby Js Skillz Racing	Yamaha	357	(United States) Kameron Barboa	8–9
TDMX Graphics	Honda	388	(United States) Brandon Ray	1–4, 6, 8
HEP Motorsports	Suzuki	446	(United States) Blaine Silveira	5–6, 8
Partzilla PRMX Kawasaki	Kawasaki	500	(Canada) Julien Benek	1–5
Partzilla PRMX Kawasaki	Kawasaki	508	(United States) Hunter Yoder	All
Team BWR	Honda	503	(United States) McClellan Hile	1, 3–6, 8
	Honda	509	(United States) Alexander Nagy	8
	Yamaha	517	(United States) Ty Freehill	1–5
Holeshot Motorsports	KTM	518	(Canada) Parker Eales	1–3
VPE	Yamaha	538	(United States) Addison Emory	1–3, 6, 8
KBR	Honda	636	(United States) Luke Kalaitzian	2–6, 8
Fanelli Equipment Repair	Gas Gas	645	(United States) Colby Copp	1–6
	Gas Gas	672	(United States) Brandon Pederson	5–6
	KTM	702	(United States) Hunter Cross	1–5
FB Factory Motorsport	KTM	865	(France) Hugo Manzato	2–3
Backyard Design	Husqvarna	973	(Germany) Philipp Klakow	1
The Mahoney's MX4Christ	Gas Gas	976	(United States) Josh Greco	1–3
Estate Jewellers Imperial Construction	KTM	995	(United States) Christopher Prebula	1–3, 6, 8
Yankton Motorsports	Kawasaki	996	(United States) Preston Taylor	1–4

=== Championship Standings ===
Pos	Rider	Bike	ANA (California)	SDI (California)	ANA (California)	OAK (California)	SEA (Washington (state))	GLE (Arizona)	EAR (New Jersey)	DEN (Colorado)	SLC (Utah)	Points
1	(Australia) Jett Lawrence	Honda	1	1	2	1	1	1	2	3	1	233
2	(United States) RJ Hampshire	Husqvarna	2	2	11	2	2	2	13	1	2	186
3	(United States) Levi Kitchen	Yamaha	7	21	1	4	6	3	12	2	3	156
4	(Brazil) Enzo Lopes	Yamaha	6	4	13	6	4	5	5	4	11	149
5	(United States) Mitchell Oldenburg	Honda	4	7	4	8	9	7		5	9	131
6	(United States) Max Vohland	KTM	5	DNQ	5	7	5	8	4	6	DNQ	121
7	(United States) Cameron McAdoo	Kawasaki	3	3	6	3	3					101
8	(United States) Pierce Brown	Gas Gas	DNQ	5	8	5	7	4	11			98
9	(United States) Derek Kelley	KTM	10	9	7	21	15	6	DNQ	7	22	87
10	(Canada) Cole Thompson	Yamaha	13	10	14	9	10	11	21	9	DNQ	87
11	(United States) Robbie Wageman	Suzuki	15	13	DNQ	12	11	9	20	10	16	78
12	(United States) Carson Mumford	Kawasaki					8	10	7	8	10	72
13	(United States) Stilez Robertson	Yamaha	9	6	3	DNQ	22	21				55
14	(United States) Hunter Yoder	Kawasaki	17	14	15	15	14	16	DNQ	15	DNQ	55
15	(United States) Derek Drake	Suzuki	12	DNQ		14	13	12	DNQ	12	DNQ	52
16	(United States) Dilan Schwartz	Suzuki	20	19	18	13	DNQ	DNQ	16	11	13	51
17	(New Zealand) Dylan Walsh	Kawasaki	11	11	10	11	DNQ					49
18	(United States) Phil Nicoletti	Yamaha	8	8	9	DNQ						44
19	(United States) Mitchell Harrison	Gas Gas	DNQ	22	17	10	19	15	DNQ	13	21	44
20	(Venezuela) Anthony Rodriguez	Honda	14	15	12	16	18					40
21	(United States) Joshua Varize	KTM	DNQ	12	21		12	14	DNQ			33
22	(United States) Max Miller	KTM	DNQ	DNQ	20	DNQ	16	DNQ	DNQ	14	DNQ	19
23	(United States) Austin Politelli	Gas Gas	DNQ	DNQ	DNQ	17	17	DNQ	DNQ	16	DNQ	19
24	(United States) Jerry Robin	Gas Gas	18	DNQ	16		DNQ	18	DNQ	21		19
25	(United States) Brandon Scharer	Suzuki			19	DNQ	DNQ	13	DNQ			14
26	(United States) Hunter Schlosser	Yamaha	21	DNQ	DNQ	20	21	17	DNQ	DNQ		13
27	(United States) Maxwell Sanford	Honda	16	DNQ	DNQ	18	DNQ	DNQ		DNQ		12
28	(Germany) Dominique Thury	Yamaha	DNQ	16	DNQ	DNQ	DNQ	DNQ	DNQ	18		12
29	(Australia) Geran Stapleton	Gas Gas	DNQ	18	DNQ	DNQ	DNQ	DNQ		17		11
30	(United States) Kaeden Amerine	KTM	DNQ	DNQ	DNQ	DNQ	20	19	DNQ	19	DNQ	11
31	(Australia) Wilson Todd	Honda	DNQ	17								6
32	(United States) Hunter Cross	KTM	19	DNQ	DNQ	DNQ	DNQ					4
33	(Canada) Julien Benek	Kawasaki	DNQ	DNQ	DNQ	19	DNQ					4
34	(Australia) Matt Moss	Suzuki				22		20				4
35	(United States) Brandon Ray	Honda	DNQ	DNQ	22	DNQ		DNQ		20		4
36	(United Kingdom) Dylan Woodcock	Gas Gas	DNQ	20	DNQ							3
37	(United States) Luke Kalaitzian	Honda		DNQ	DNQ	DNQ	DNQ	22		22		2
38	(United States) Austin Forkner	Kawasaki	22									1
	(United States) RJ Wageman	Yamaha	DNQ	DNQ	DNQ	DNQ	DNQ	DNQ		DNQ		0
	(United States) Nicholas Nisbet	Honda	DNQ	DNQ	DNQ	DNQ	DNQ	DNQ		DNQ		0
	(United States) Colby Copp	Gas Gas	DNQ	DNQ	DNQ	DNQ	DNQ	DNQ				0
	(United States) Chris Howell	Yamaha	DNQ	DNQ	DNQ	DNQ	DNQ	DNQ				0
	(United States) Chance Blackburn	Yamaha	DNQ	DNQ	DNQ	DNQ	DNQ			DNQ		0
	(Mexico) Tre Fierro	Kawasaki	DNQ	DNQ	DNQ		DNQ	DNQ		DNQ		0
	(United States) McClellan Hile	Honda	DNQ		DNQ	DNQ	DNQ	DNQ		DNQ		0
	(United States) Ty Freehill	Yamaha	DNQ	DNQ	DNQ	DNQ	DNQ					0
	(United States) Ryan Carlson	Kawasaki	DNQ	DNQ	DNQ	DNQ				DNQ		0
	(United States) Christopher Prebula	KTM	DNQ	DNQ	DNQ			DNQ		DNQ		0
	(United States) Addison Emory	Yamaha	DNQ	DNQ	DNQ			DNQ		DNQ		0
	(United States) Chad Saultz	KTM	DNQ	DNQ	DNQ					DNQ	DNQ	0
	(United States) Preston Taylor	Kawasaki	DNQ	DNQ	DNQ	DNQ						0
	(United States) Devin Harriman	KTM	DNQ	DNQ	DNQ	DNQ						0
	(United States) Todd Bannister	Kawasaki	DNQ	DNQ	DNQ					DNQ		0
	(United States) Josh Greco	Gas Gas	DNQ	DNQ	DNQ							0
	(Canada) Parker Eales	KTM	DNQ	DNQ	DNQ							0
	(United States) Blaine Silveira	Suzuki					DNQ	DNQ		DNQ		0
	(United States) Ty Masterpool	Suzuki	DNQ	DNQ								0
	(United States) Kayden Palmer	Honda	DNQ	DNQ								0
	(United States) Luis Macias	Kawasaki	DNQ							DNQ		0
	(France) Hugo Manzato	KTM		DNQ	DNQ							0
	(United States) Jayce Baldwin	Kawasaki		DNQ		DNQ						0
	(United States) Brandon Pederson	Gas Gas					DNQ	DNQ				0
	(United States) Kameron Barboa	Yamaha								DNQ	DNQ	0
	(Germany) Philipp Klakow	Husqvarna	DNQ									0
	(United States) Patrick Evans	Gas Gas						DNQ				0
	(United States) Alexander Nagy	KTM								DNQ		0
Pos	Rider	Bike	ANA (California)	SDI (California)	ANA (California)	OAK (California)	SEA (Washington (state))	GLE (Arizona)	EAR (New Jersey)	DEN (Colorado)	SLC (Utah)	Points

== 250 SX East ==
=== Entry list ===
Team	Constructor	No	Rider	Rounds
Muc-Off FXR ClubMX Yamaha Racing	Yamaha	6	(United States) Jeremy Martin	1–7, 9–10
Muc-Off FXR ClubMX Yamaha Racing	Yamaha	71	(United States) Preston Kilroy	1
Monster Energy Star Racing Yamaha	Yamaha	29	(United States) Nate Thrasher	1–7
Monster Energy Star Racing Yamaha	Yamaha	58	(United States) Jordon Smith	All
Monster Energy Star Racing Yamaha	Yamaha	238	(United States) Haiden Deegan	All
Monster Energy Pro Circuit Kawasaki	Kawasaki	30	(Japan) Jo Shimoda	7–10
Monster Energy Pro Circuit Kawasaki	Kawasaki	35	(United States) Seth Hammaker	
Monster Energy Pro Circuit Kawasaki	Kawasaki	57	(United States) Chris Blose	All
Troy Lee Designs Gas Gas Factory Racing	Gas Gas	31	(United States) Michael Mosiman	1–4
Rockstar Energy Husqvarna Factory Racing USA	Husqvarna	38	(United States) Jalek Swoll	
Rockstar Energy Husqvarna Factory Racing USA	Husqvarna	339	(United States) Talon Hawkins	All
Progressive Insurance ECSTAR Suzuki	Suzuki	50	(United States) Marshal Weltin	1–9
Phoenix Racing Honda	Honda	62	(United States) Jace Owen	All
Phoenix Racing Honda	Honda	67	(United States) Cullin Park	All
Phoenix Racing Honda	Honda	243	(United States) Caden Braswell	1–9
Phoenix Racing Honda	Honda	285	(United States) Coty Schock	All
Fire Power Honda Racing	Honda	63	(United Kingdom) Max Anstie	All
Fire Power Honda Racing	Honda	602	(United States) Gage Linville	1–7
TiLube Storm Lake Honda Racing	Honda	66	(United States) Henry Miller	All
TiLube Storm Lake Honda Racing	Honda	460	(United States) Michael Hicks	All
Partzilla PRMX Kawasaki	Kawasaki	86	(New Zealand) Josiah Natzke	All
Partzilla PRMX Kawasaki	Kawasaki	170	(United States) Devin Simonson	1–6
Valley Ford Truck Dean Hushon Insulation	Honda	91	(United States) Jeremy Hand	1–7, 9
STR Honda	Honda	95	(United States) Lance Kobusch	6–7
Team Honda HRC	Honda	96	(Australia) Hunter Lawrence	All
Team Honda HRC	Honda	832	(United States) Chance Hymas	1–4
Namura Invictus Speed Crew	Kawasaki	99	(Chile) Hardy Muñoz	1–5, 7
Namura Invictus Speed Crew	Kawasaki	399	(Spain) Jorge Zaragoza	
Rides Unlimited Rocky Mountain ATV/MC Racing	KTM	115	(United States) Jonah Geistler	1–4
Rides Unlimited Rocky Mountain ATV/MC Racing	KTM	192	(United States) Jack Chambers	1–6
3D Racing Yamaha	Yamaha	116	(United States) TJ Albright	5–10
RCCZ KTM Team	KTM	118	(United States) Cheyenne Harmon	3–6
RCCZ KTM Team	KTM	343	(United States) Carter Biese	2–3
Team TPJ	Gas Gas	119	(United States) Logan Boye	1–7, 9
Team TPJ	Yamaha	242	(United States) Garrett Hoffman	1–2, 4–9
Team TPJ	KTM	504	(Honduras) Gerhard Matamoros	1–2, 4–7, 9
Team TPJ	KTM	971	(United States) Brian Saunier	2–10
Red Research Group	Honda	125	(United States) Luke Neese	1–3, 5–10
Red Bull KTM Factory Racing USA	KTM	128	(France) Tom Vialle	All
Team Hawkey	Kawasaki	130	(United States) Kyler Hawkey	3–5, 7, 9
Future MX	Kawasaki	137	(United States) Ayden Shive	1–4
Future MX	Kawasaki	427	(United States) Cole Bradford	1–3
DMP Motorsports	Yamaha	138	(United States) David Pulley Jr.	1–4, 6–10
Fenestella Riddles Motorsports	Yamaha	146	(United States) Brandon Marley	7–9
Manluk Rock River Yamaha	Yamaha	167	(United States) Jesse Flock	1–4
Manluk Rock River Yamaha	Yamaha	174	(United States) Luca Marsalisi	1–7
Manluk Rock River Yamaha	Yamaha	614	(Canada) Quinn Amyotte	2–4
Ronnie Prado Company	Gas Gas	191	(United States) Curren Thurman	1–5, 9
Adams & Sons HVAC Underdog Fantasy	Kawasaki	208	(United States) Logan Leitzel	1–6
Mosites Motorsports	Kawasaki	247	(United States) Brock Papi	1–6, 9
TCD Suspension	KTM	269	(United States) Blake Hazen	4–7, 9
Georgia Electrical Services	KTM	280	(United States) Jack Beeland	1–2, 4–5, 7, 9
	Suzuki	281	(United States) Cory Carsten	9
	Yamaha	289	(United States) Robert Hailey	All
Ford Brothers Racing	Yamaha	296	(United States) Ryder Floyd	1
BWR Engines	Honda	299	(United States) Konnor Visger	1–7, 9
Cornerstone Builders	Kawasaki	300	(United States) Lane Allison	1–7
The Shoals MX	Husqvarna	315	(United States) Cody Groves	7, 9
The Moto Academy	Honda	330	(United States) AJ Catanzaro	1–9
	Kawasaki	351	(United States) Jack Rogers	1–2, 4–7, 9
DRJ Racing	KTM	366	(United States) Blaze Cremaldi	1–2, 4–7
	KTM	372	(United States) Hayden Hefner	4, 6–7, 9
Munson Excavating	Kawasaki	382	(United States) Rylan Munson	1–2, 4–7, 9–10
Williams Motowerx	Gas Gas	464	(United States) Doc Smith	1–7, 9
TCD Racing	Yamaha	483	(United States) Bryton Carroll	1–7, 9
SGB Unlimited Honda	Honda	511	(United States) Jace Kessler	1–2, 4–7, 9
	Yamaha	544	(United States) Noah Willbrandt	1–7
RRCZ KTM Team	KTM	551	(Canada) Guillaume St-Cyr	5–7
Iron Supply Powersports	Gas Gas	552	(United States) Larry Reyes	1, 3–5
	Husqvarna	573	(United States) Christopher Blackmer	6
Lasting Impression Race Team	Honda	581	(United States) Kyle Bitterman	7
James A Dillin PLS	KTM	675	(United States) Kyle Dillin	9
CC Construction Camp Easy Ride	Kawasaki	689	(United States) Tony Usko	2, 4–5, 7, 9
Tjs Cycle	Gas Gas	812	(United States) Luke Dickey	9
TR Inscore	Gas Gas	822	(United States) Riley Ripper	1, 3–4
Fusion Motorsports	KTM	874	(United States) Zack Williams	1–3
Storm Lake Honda	Honda	942	(United States) Deegan Hepp	4, 6, 9
Adventure Moto	Husqvarna	958	(United States) Matthew Curler	1–3, 6

=== Championship Standings ===
Pos	Rider	Bike	HOU (Texas)	TAM (Florida)	ARL (Texas)	DAY (Florida)	IND (Indiana)	DET (Michigan)	HAM (Georgia (U.S. state))	EAR (New Jersey)	NAS (Tennessee)	SLC (Utah)	Points
1	(Australia) Hunter Lawrence	Honda	1	1	3	1	1	1	1	3	1	6	241
2	(United States) Haiden Deegan	Yamaha	4	4	8	3	7	3	3	6	4	8	183
3	(United Kingdom) Max Anstie	Honda	2	3	5	2	5	22	5	1	5	7	182
4	(United States) Jordon Smith	Yamaha	3	15	2	4	3	DNQ	2	18	3	5	159
5	(United States) Chris Blose	Kawasaki	10	13	9	7	6	5	7	10	8	12	143
6	(United States) Jeremy Martin	Yamaha	5	5	6	5	4	4	21		6	19	132
7	(United States) Nate Thrasher	Yamaha	15	2	1	10	2	2	19				120
8	(France) Tom Vialle	KTM	7	6	4	22	8	6	22	14	7	14	120
9	(United States) Cullin Park	Honda	9	DNQ	14	9	9	7	9	8	10	15	117
10	(United States) Coty Schock	Honda	12	11	17	8	10	8	18	17	17	18	94
11	(United States) Henry Miller	Honda	13	14	12	DNQ	12	9	6	DNQ	9	DNQ	86
12	(United States) Jace Owen	Honda	14	9	11	19	11	11	20	22	14	17	82
13	(Japan) Jo Shimoda	Kawasaki							4	9	2	4	75
14	(United States) Talon Hawkins	Husqvarna	11	19	13	18	15	15	8	DNQ	12	DNQ	73
15	(United States) Jeremy Hand	Honda	18	DNQ	15	12	16	13	12		13		62
16	(United States) Chance Hymas	Honda	8	8	10	6							60
17	(United States) Michael Hicks	Honda	19	22	21	14	13	10	15	19	19	20	58
18	(United States) Caden Braswell	Honda	DNQ	12	DNQ	20	17	12	10	DNQ	15		52
19	(United States) Michael Mosiman	Gas Gas	6	7	7	21							51
20	(United States) Luke Neese	Honda	20	16	20		21	DNQ	14	15	11	DNQ	44
21	(United States) Marshal Weltin	Suzuki	DNQ	DNQ	16	11	14	21	11	DNQ	DNQ		42
22	(Chile) Hardy Muñoz	Kawasaki	16	10	22	13	22		DNQ				32
23	(United States) Brock Papi	Kawasaki	17	18	18	DNQ	20	14			22		29
24	(United States) AJ Catanzaro	Honda	22	DNQ	19	DNQ	19	16	16	DNQ	18		28
25	(New Zealand) Josiah Natzke	Kawasaki	DNQ	21	DNQ	15	DNQ	DNQ	DNQ	DNQ	16	DNQ	17
26	(United States) Gage Linville	Honda	DNQ	DNQ	DNQ	DNQ	DNQ	19	13				14
27	(United States) Devin Simonson	Kawasaki	21	20	DNQ	16	DNQ	DNQ					12
28	(United States) Jack Chambers	KTM	DNQ	DNQ	DNQ	17	DNQ	17					12
29	(United States) Lane Allison	Kawasaki	DNQ	DNQ	DNQ	DNQ	18	18	DNQ				10
30	(United States) TJ Albright	Yamaha					DNQ	DNQ	17	DNQ	DNQ	DNQ	6
31	(United States) Luca Marsalisi	Yamaha	DNQ	17	DNQ	DNQ	DNQ	DNQ	DNQ				6
32	(United States) Lance Kobusch	Honda						20	DNQ				3
33	(United States) Garrett Hoffman	Yamaha	DNQ	DNQ		DNQ	DNQ	DNQ	DNQ	DNQ	20		3
34	(United States) Jace Kessler	Honda	DNQ	DNQ		DNQ	DNQ	DNQ	DNQ		21		2
	(United States) Robert Hailey	Yamaha	DNQ	DNQ	DNQ	DNQ	DNQ	DNQ	DNQ	DNQ	DNQ	DNQ	0
	(United States) David Pulley Jr.	Yamaha	DNQ	DNQ	DNQ	DNQ	DNQ	DNQ	DNQ	DNQ	DNQ	DNQ	0
	(United States) Brian Saunier	KTM		DNQ	DNQ	DNQ	DNQ	DNQ	DNQ	DNQ	DNQ	DNQ	0
	(United States) Bryton Carroll	Yamaha	DNQ	DNQ	DNQ	DNQ	DNQ	DNQ	DNQ		DNQ		0
	(United States) Logan Boye	Gas Gas	DNQ	DNQ	DNQ	DNQ	DNQ	DNQ	DNQ		DNQ		0
	(United States) Konnor Visger	Honda	DNQ	DNQ	DNQ	DNQ	DNQ	DNQ	DNQ		DNQ		0
	(United States) Doc Smith	Gas Gas	DNQ	DNQ	DNQ	DNQ	DNQ	DNQ	DNQ		DNQ		0
	(United States) Rylan Munson	Kawasaki	DNQ	DNQ		DNQ	DNQ	DNQ	DNQ		DNQ	DNQ	0
	(United States) Noah Willbrandt	Yamaha	DNQ	DNQ	DNQ	DNQ	DNQ	DNQ	DNQ				0
	(United States) Jack Rogers	Kawasaki	DNQ	DNQ		DNQ	DNQ	DNQ	DNQ		DNQ		0
	(Honduras) Gerhard Matamoros	KTM	DNQ	DNQ		DNQ	DNQ	DNQ	DNQ		DNQ		0
	(United States) Logan Leitzel	Kawasaki	DNQ	DNQ	DNQ	DNQ	DNQ	DNQ					0
	(United States) Curren Thurman	Gas Gas	DNQ	DNQ	DNQ	DNQ	DNQ				DNQ		0
	(United States) Blaze Cremaldi	KTM	DNQ	DNQ		DNQ	DNQ	DNQ	DNQ				0
	(United States) Jack Beeland	KTM	DNQ	DNQ		DNQ	DNQ		DNQ		DNQ		0
	(United States) Tony Usko	Kawasaki		DNQ		DNQ	DNQ		DNQ		DNQ		0
	(United States) Kyler Hawkey	Kawasaki			DNQ	DNQ	DNQ		DNQ		DNQ		0
	(United States) Blake Hazen	KTM				DNQ	DNQ	DNQ	DNQ		DNQ		0
	(United States) Jesse Flock	Yamaha	DNQ	DNQ	DNQ	DNQ							0
	(United States) Jonah Geistler	KTM	DNQ	DNQ	DNQ	DNQ							0
	(United States) Ayden Shive	Kawasaki	DNQ	DNQ	DNQ	DNQ							0
	(United States) Matthew Curler	Husqvarna	DNQ	DNQ	DNQ			DNQ					0
	(United States) Larry Reyes	Gas Gas	DNQ		DNQ	DNQ	DNQ						0
	(United States) Cheyenne Harmon	KTM			DNQ	DNQ	DNQ	DNQ					0
	(United States) Hayden Hefner	KTM				DNQ		DNQ	DNQ		DNQ		0
	(United States) Zack Williams	KTM	DNQ	DNQ	DNQ								0
	(United States) Cole Bradford	Kawasaki	DNQ	DNQ	DNQ								0
	(United States) Riley Ripper	Gas Gas	DNQ		DNQ	DNQ							0
	(Canada) Quinn Amyotte	Yamaha		DNQ	DNQ	DNQ							0
	(United States) Deegan Hepp	Honda				DNQ		DNQ			DNQ		0
	(Canada) Guillaume St-Cyr	KTM					DNQ	DNQ	DNQ				0
	(United States) Brandon Marley	Yamaha							DNQ	DNQ	DNQ		0
	(United States) Carter Biese	KTM		DNQ	DNQ								0
	(United States) Cody Groves	Husqvarna							DNQ		DNQ		0
	(United States) Ryder Floyd	Yamaha	DNQ										0
	(United States) Preston Kilroy	Yamaha	DNQ										0
	(United States) Christopher Blackmer	Husqvarna						DNQ					0
	(United States) Kyle Bitterman	Honda							DNQ				0
	(United States) Cory Carsten	Suzuki									DNQ		0
	(United States) Kyle Dillin	KTM									DNQ		0
	(United States) Luke Dickey	Gas Gas									DNQ		0
Pos	Rider	Bike	HOU (Texas)	TAM (Florida)	ARL (Texas)	DAY (Florida)	IND (Indiana)	DET (Michigan)	HAM (Georgia (U.S. state))	EAR (New Jersey)	NAS (Tennessee)	SLC (Utah)	Points
