= 2019 AMA National Motocross Championship =

Motorcycle racing season

The 2019 AMA Motocross Championship season is the 47th AMA Motocross National Championship season, the premier motocross series in USA. Eli Tomac goes into the season as the defending champion in the 450 class, after taking his second 450 national title in 2018.

== Calendar and Results ==
=== 450cc ===
| Round | Date | Location | Race 1 Winner | Race 2 Winner | Round Winner |
|---|---|---|---|---|---|
| 1 | May 18 | (California) Hangtown Motocross Classic | (Germany) Ken Roczen | (United States) Eli Tomac | (Germany) Ken Roczen |
| 2 | May 25 | (California) Fox Raceway at Pala | (United States) Eli Tomac | (United States) Eli Tomac | (United States) Eli Tomac |
| 3 | June 1 | (Colorado) Thunder Valley National | (Germany) Ken Roczen | (United States) Eli Tomac | (Germany) Ken Roczen |
| 4 | June 15 | (Pennsylvania) High Point National | (United States) Blake Baggett | (Germany) Ken Roczen | (United States) Eli Tomac |
| 5 | June 22 | (Florida) WW Ranch Motocross Park | (France) Marvin Musquin | (United States) Eli Tomac | (France) Marvin Musquin |
| 6 | June 29 | (Massachusetts) Southwick National | (France) Marvin Musquin | (United States) Zach Osborne | (France) Marvin Musquin |
| 7 | July 6 | (Michigan) Red Bud National | (United States) Eli Tomac | (France) Marvin Musquin | (United States) Eli Tomac |
| 8 | July 20 | (Minnesota) Spring Creek National | (United States) Cooper Webb | (United States) Cooper Webb | (United States) Cooper Webb |
| 9 | July 27 | (Washington (state)) Washougal National | (United States) Eli Tomac | (United States) Eli Tomac | (United States) Eli Tomac |
| 10 | August 10 | (New York (state)) Unadilla National | (Germany) Ken Roczen | (Germany) Ken Roczen | (Germany) Ken Roczen |
| 11 | August 17 | (Maryland) Budds Creek National | (United States) Eli Tomac | (United States) Eli Tomac | (United States) Eli Tomac |
| 12 | August 24 | (Indiana) Ironman National | (France) Marvin Musquin | (United States) Eli Tomac | (United States) Eli Tomac |

=== 250cc ===
| Round | Date | Location | Race 1 Winner | Race 2 Winner | Round Winner |
|---|---|---|---|---|---|
| 1 | May 18 | (California) Hangtown Motocross Classic | (United States) Justin Cooper | (United States) Adam Cianciarulo | (United States) Adam Cianciarulo |
| 2 | May 25 | (California) Fox Raceway at Pala | (United States) Justin Cooper | (United States) Adam Cianciarulo | (United States) Adam Cianciarulo |
| 3 | June 1 | (Colorado) Thunder Valley National | (United States) Justin Cooper | (United States) Adam Cianciarulo | (United States) Adam Cianciarulo |
| 4 | June 15 | (Pennsylvania) High Point National | (Australia) Hunter Lawrence | (United States) Adam Cianciarulo | (United States) Adam Cianciarulo |
| 5 | June 22 | (Florida) WW Ranch Motocross Park | (United States) Chase Sexton | (France) Dylan Ferrandis | (United States) Justin Cooper |
| 6 | June 29 | (Massachusetts) Southwick National | (United States) Adam Cianciarulo | (France) Dylan Ferrandis | (United States) Adam Cianciarulo |
| 7 | July 6 | (Michigan) Red Bud National | (France) Dylan Ferrandis | (France) Dylan Ferrandis | (France) Dylan Ferrandis |
| 8 | July 20 | (Minnesota) Spring Creek National | (Australia) Hunter Lawrence | (United States) Adam Cianciarulo | (United States) Adam Cianciarulo |
| 9 | July 27 | (Washington (state)) Washougal National | (France) Dylan Ferrandis | (France) Dylan Ferrandis | (France) Dylan Ferrandis |
| 10 | August 10 | (New York (state)) Unadilla National | (United States) Adam Cianciarulo | (France) Dylan Ferrandis | (France) Dylan Ferrandis |
| 11 | August 17 | (Maryland) Budds Creek National | (United States) Shane McElrath | (United States) Shane McElrath | (United States) Shane McElrath |
| 12 | August 24 | (Indiana) Ironman National | (France) Dylan Ferrandis | (France) Dylan Ferrandis | (France) Dylan Ferrandis |

== 450cc ==
=== Riders Championship ===
| Pos | No | Rider | Bike | HAN (California) | | FOX (California) | | THU (Colorado) | | HIG (Pennsylvania) | | WWR (Florida) | | SOU (Massachusetts) | | RED (Michigan) | | SPR (Minnesota) | | WAS (Washington (state)) | | UNA (New York (state)) | | BUD (Maryland) | | IRN (Indiana) | | Points |
|---|---|---|---|---|---|---|---|---|---|---|---|---|---|---|---|---|---|---|---|---|---|---|---|---|---|---|---|---|
| 1 | 1 | (United States) Eli Tomac | Kawasaki | 4 | 1 | 1 | 1 | 5 | 1 | 3 | 2 | 7 | 1 | 2 | 3 | 1 | 2 | 2 | 5 | 1 | 1 | 7 | 3 | 1 | 1 | 3 | 1 | 521 |
| 2 | 94 | (Germany) Ken Roczen | Honda | 1 | 2 | 2 | 3 | 1 | 2 | 6 | 1 | 2 | 10 | 12 | 10 | 6 | 3 | 14 | 2 | 2 | 3 | 1 | 1 | 2 | 7 | 2 | 3 | 463 |
| 3 | 25 | (France) Marvin Musquin | KTM | 7 | 4 | 3 | 2 | 8 | 3 | 4 | 7 | 1 | 3 | 1 | 2 | 7 | 1 | 3 | 7 | 5 | 2 | 2 | 2 | 3 | 3 | 1 | Ret | 451 |
| 4 | 21 | (United States) Jason Anderson | Husqvarna | 2 | 5 | 4 | 5 | 4 | 5 | 2 | 5 | 3 | 4 | 7 | 5 | 2 | 4 | 12 | 10 | 4 | 7 | 5 | 5 | 4 | 2 | 6 | 5 | 407 |
| 5 | 16 | (United States) Zach Osborne | Husqvarna | 5 | 3 | 5 | 4 | 2 | 4 | 5 | 4 | 5 | 2 | 3 | 1 | | | 4 | 3 | 9 | 4 | 4 | 4 | 5 | 4 | 5 | 2 | 403 |
| 6 | 2 | (United States) Cooper Webb | KTM | 3 | 6 | 6 | 6 | 3 | 8 | 7 | 3 | 4 | 5 | 4 | 4 | 3 | 5 | 1 | 1 | 3 | 5 | 37 | | | | | | 324 |
| 7 | 51 | (United States) Justin Barcia | Yamaha | 8 | 7 | 7 | 10 | 11 | 6 | 10 | 10 | 6 | 6 | 6 | 6 | Ret | 10 | 11 | 4 | 10 | 9 | 3 | 10 | 6 | 5 | 7 | 4 | 315 |
| 8 | 101 | (Sweden) Fredrik Norén | Suzuki | 17 | 17 | 9 | 9 | 15 | 13 | 15 | 17 | 9 | 8 | 5 | 7 | 8 | 13 | 7 | 11 | 8 | 8 | 12 | 8 | 15 | 13 | 10 | 10 | 240 |
| 9 | 19 | (United States) Justin Bogle | KTM | 10 | 9 | 12 | 12 | 10 | 10 | 9 | 8 | 19 | 12 | 11 | 13 | 4 | 6 | 10 | 16 | 12 | 11 | 10 | 9 | 19 | | 33 | 9 | 222 |
| 10 | 4 | (United States) Blake Baggett | KTM | 6 | 10 | 33 | 14 | 7 | 7 | 1 | 15 | 8 | 9 | 10 | 18 | 5 | 9 | 17 | 9 | | | | | | | | | 175 |
| 11 | 17 | (United States) Joey Savatgy | Kawasaki | | | | | Ret | Ret | 8 | 6 | 11 | 18 | Ret | 8 | Ret | Ret | 8 | Ret | 6 | 6 | 6 | 6 | | | 4 | 6 | 160 |
| 12 | 29 | (United States) Benny Bloss | KTM | | | | | | | 14 | 9 | 13 | 23 | 9 | Ret | 9 | 8 | 16 | 6 | Ret | | 9 | 7 | 7 | 11 | 8 | 8 | 160 |
| 13 | 15 | (United Kingdom) Dean Wilson | Husqvarna | | | | | | | | | | | | | 12 | 7 | 15 | 12 | 7 | 10 | 8 | 11 | 8 | 6 | 9 | 7 | 140 |
| 14 | 103 | (Australia) Dean Ferris | Yamaha | 11 | 8 | 10 | 13 | 6 | 9 | 11 | 11 | 10 | 7 | 8 | 12 | | | | | | | | | | | | | 136 |
| 15 | 63 | (United States) John Short | Honda | | | | | 25 | 16 | 20 | 13 | Ret | 17 | 15 | 9 | 33 | 15 | 6 | 8 | 11 | 12 | 15 | 13 | 10 | 10 | 11 | Ret | 135 |
| 16 | 49 | (United States) Henry Miller | KTM | 24 | 22 | 19 | 23 | 13 | 20 | 13 | 18 | 17 | 19 | 13 | Ret | 10 | 14 | 5 | 14 | 14 | 18 | 13 | 14 | Ret | Ret | 14 | 18 | 117 |
| 17 | 56 | (Venezuela) Lorenzo Locurcio | Kawasaki | 21 | 23 | 14 | 31 | 18 | 15 | 18 | 14 | 12 | 11 | Ret | 11 | 14 | 12 | 21 | 15 | 18 | 15 | 18 | 16 | 12 | Ret | | | 103 |
| 18 | 43 | (United States) Tyler Bowers | Kawasaki | 18 | 19 | 18 | 29 | 17 | 19 | 12 | 12 | 16 | 14 | 19 | Ret | 16 | 21 | 22 | 17 | 15 | 16 | Ret | 15 | 16 | 14 | 13 | 14 | 99 |
| 19 | 41 | (United States) Ben Lamay | Honda | 14 | 12 | Ret | 16 | 19 | 17 | 16 | 16 | 14 | 13 | 25 | 17 | 18 | Ret | 20 | Ret | 13 | 14 | 16 | 17 | Ret | Ret | | | 84 |
| 20 | 37 | (United States) Kyle Cunningham | Suzuki | | | | | | | | | | | | | 13 | Ret | Ret | 13 | | | 11 | 12 | 11 | 8 | 12 | 12 | 76 |
| 21 | 7 | (United States) Aaron Plessinger | Yamaha | | | | | | | | | | | 18 | 16 | 11 | 11 | 9 | Ret | Ret | 13 | 31 | 18 | 9 | 9 | 23 | | 75 |
| 22 | 14 | (United States) Cole Seely | Honda | 9 | 18 | 11 | 8 | 9 | 12 | | | | | | | | | | | | | | | | | | | 59 |
| 23 | 700 | (United States) James Weeks | Yamaha | Ret | Ret | 26 | 22 | 24 | 22 | 22 | 23 | 22 | 15 | 14 | 27 | 20 | Ret | 18 | Ret | 19 | 17 | 14 | 19 | 14 | 12 | 16 | 21 | 53 |
| 24 | 46 | (United States) Justin Hill | Suzuki | 16 | 21 | 8 | 7 | 12 | 11 | | | | | | | | | | | | | | | | | | | 51 |
| 25 | 477 | (Australia) Todd Waters | Husqvarna | 12 | 13 | 16 | 11 | 14 | 14 | | | | | | | | | | | | | | | | | | | 46 |
| 26 | 718 | (Japan) Toshiki Tomita | Honda | 36 | 14 | 24 | 18 | 21 | 18 | 19 | 19 | 18 | 32 | 20 | 36 | | | | | | | 20 | 39 | 18 | 15 | 18 | 16 | 39 |
| 27 | 319 | (United States) Coty Schock | KTM | | | | | | | 26 | 24 | 30 | 33 | 17 | 14 | 15 | 16 | 28 | 18 | | | 21 | 20 | 13 | 17 | 27 | Ret | 38 |
| 28 | 69 | (United States) Jake Masterpool | Honda | 13 | 11 | 13 | 26 | 16 | Ret | 17 | 29 | Ret | | | | | | | | | | | | | | | | 35 |
| 29 | 119 | (United States) Isaac Teasdale | Suzuki | | | | | | | 24 | 26 | | | 30 | 21 | 19 | 20 | 13 | 20 | 17 | 19 | 17 | 21 | 17 | 16 | 21 | 30 | 31 |
| 30 | 929 | (Japan) Taiki Koga | Kawasaki | 23 | 15 | 22 | 17 | 20 | Ret | Ret | | 31 | Ret | 31 | 21 | 35 | 17 | 19 | 34 | 16 | 32 | | | | | | | 23 |
| 31 | 54 | (United States) Dylan Merriam | Husqvarna | 20 | 16 | 15 | 15 | 28 | Ret | | | | | | | | | Ret | 30 | Ret | | | | | | | | 18 |
| 32 | 11 | (United States) Kyle Chisholm | Suzuki | | | | | | | 23 | 20 | 15 | 22 | | | 17 | 19 | | | | | | | | | | | 13 |
| 33 | 90 | (United States) Jeremy Hand | Honda | | | | | | | 27 | 22 | | | | | 25 | Ret | 24 | 22 | | | 23 | 22 | 20 | 18 | 17 | 17 | 12 |
| 34 | 285 | (United States) Marshal Weltin | KTM | | | | | | | | | | | | | | | | | | | | | | | 20 | 11 | 11 |
| 35 | 332 | (United States) Dustin Winter | Yamaha | 31 | 28 | 28 | 21 | Ret | 26 | | | | | | | 23 | 18 | Ret | Ret | | | Ret | | Ret | Ret | 19 | 15 | 11 |
| 36 | 70 | (United States) Joshua Osby | Yamaha | | | | | | | | | | | | | | | | | | | | | | | 15 | 20 | 7 |
| 37 | 711 | (United States) Tristan Lane | KTM | | | | | | | 29 | 31 | 24 | 21 | 22 | 15 | 24 | 24 | | | | | | | | | | | 6 |
| 38 | 48 | (New Zealand) Cody Cooper | Honda | 15 | Ret | 29 | Ret | 30 | 29 | | | | | | | | | | | | | | | | | | | 6 |
| 39 | 647 | (United States) Matthew Hubert | Husqvarna | | | 30 | 28 | | | | | 23 | 16 | | | Ret | 29 | Ret | 25 | | | 30 | 25 | Ret | 22 | 32 | 24 | 5 |
| 40 | 716 | (United States) Ryan Dowd | Suzuki | | | | | | | | | | | 16 | 24 | | | | | | | 26 | 28 | | | | | 5 |
| 41 | 218 | (Estonia) Erki Kahro | KTM | 22 | Ret | 17 | 20 | | | | | | | | | | | | | | | | | | | | | 5 |
| 42 | 444 | (United States) Caleb Tennant | KTM | 26 | Ret | | | | | | | | | | | | | | | 24 | 24 | 19 | Ret | 24 | Ret | 22 | 19 | 4 |
| 43 | 125 | (United States) Luke Neese | Honda | | | | | | | | | Ret | | | Ret | | | | | | | | | Ret | Ret | 29 | 18 | 3 |
| 44 | 577 | (Mexico) Félix López Guttiérez | KTM | | | | | | | 25 | 21 | 20 | Ret | | | 22 | 22 | 26 | 19 | | | 25 | 26 | 23 | 24 | Ret | Ret | 3 |
| 45 | 221 | (Denmark) Mathias Jørgensen | Honda | 25 | 20 | 25 | 19 | Ret | 24 | Ret | Ret | Ret | | | | | | | | | | | | | | | | 3 |
| 46 | 88 | (United States) Chris Canning | Kawasaki | | | | | | | | | | | 21 | 19 | | | | | | | | | | | | | 2 |
| 47 | 270 | (United States) Jacob Runkles | KTM | | | | | | | 30 | 30 | | 28 | Ret | 30 | 27 | 30 | 25 | 23 | | | 24 | 27 | 21 | 19 | 25 | 33 | 2 |
| 48 | 85 | (United States) Dare Demartile | Honda | 19 | 25 | 23 | 27 | Ret | 30 | | | | | | | | | | | | | | | | | | | 2 |
| 49 | 80 | (United States) Heath Harrison | Kawasaki | | | | | | | Ret | Ret | Ret | 20 | Ret | Ret | 29 | 23 | | | | | 33 | Ret | 28 | 21 | Ret | Ret | 1 |
| 50 | 174 | (United States) Noah McConahy | Yamaha | | | | | | | | | | | | | | | | | 22 | 20 | | | | | | | 1 |
| 51 | 68 | (United States) Brandan Leith | Kawasaki | 27 | Ret | 20 | 25 | 22 | 31 | | | | | | | | | | | | | | | | | | | 1 |
| 52 | 74 | (United States) Cade Autenrieth | KTM | Ret | Ret | Ret | 24 | | | | | | | | | | | | | 20 | 23 | | | | | | | 1 |
| 53 | 309 | (United States) Jeremy Smith | Honda | 29 | Ret | 35 | 33 | | | 28 | 37 | 28 | 26 | 32 | 32 | | | | | | | 34 | 23 | 26 | 20 | 34 | 32 | 1 |
| Pos | No | Rider | Bike | HAN (California) | | FOX (California) | | THU (Colorado) | | HIG (Pennsylvania) | | WWR (Florida) | | SOU (Massachusetts) | | RED (Michigan) | | SPR (Minnesota) | | WAS (Washington (state)) | | UNA (New York (state)) | | BUD (Maryland) | | IRN (Indiana) | | Points |

== 250cc ==
=== Riders Championship ===
| Pos | No | Rider | Bike | HAN (California) | | FOX (California) | | THU (Colorado) | | HIG (Pennsylvania) | | WWR (Florida) | | SOU (Massachusetts) | | RED (Michigan) | | SPR (Minnesota) | | WAS (Washington (state)) | | UNA (New York (state)) | | BUD (Maryland) | | IRN (Indiana) | | Points |
|---|---|---|---|---|---|---|---|---|---|---|---|---|---|---|---|---|---|---|---|---|---|---|---|---|---|---|---|---|
| 1 | 92 | (United States) Adam Cianciarulo | Kawasaki | 2 | 1 | 3 | 1 | 2 | 1 | 2 | 1 | 5 | 3 | 1 | 2 | 5 | 2 | 3 | 1 | 3 | 2 | 1 | 2 | 2 | 5 | 2 | 4 | 519 |
| 2 | 34 | (France) Dylan Ferrandis | Yamaha | 3 | 5 | 7 | 3 | 3 | 5 | 3 | 4 | 4 | 1 | 3 | 1 | 1 | 1 | 5 | 4 | 1 | 1 | 2 | 1 | 4 | 4 | 1 | 1 | 499 |
| 3 | 32 | (United States) Justin Cooper | Yamaha | 1 | 4 | 1 | 4 | 1 | 2 | 6 | 9 | 2 | 2 | 2 | 3 | 3 | 6 | 7 | 10 | 2 | 4 | 4 | 4 | 6 | 2 | 3 | 2 | 461 |
| 4 | 31 | (United States) RJ Hampshire | Honda | 6 | 7 | 2 | Ret | 5 | 11 | 9 | 6 | 6 | 11 | 4 | 4 | 2 | 8 | 6 | 11 | 8 | 5 | 12 | 7 | 3 | 8 | 9 | 6 | 337 |
| 5 | 23 | (United States) Chase Sexton | Honda | 4 | 6 | 5 | 5 | 7 | 6 | 4 | 2 | 1 | Ret | 13 | Ret | | | Ret | 7 | 4 | 6 | 3 | 3 | 12 | 6 | 4 | 3 | 316 |
| 6 | 26 | (United States) Alex Martin | Suzuki | 23 | 2 | 10 | 6 | 9 | 12 | 13 | 11 | 7 | 6 | 10 | 5 | 19 | 3 | 2 | 3 | 13 | 7 | 7 | 10 | 18 | 3 | 6 | 8 | 305 |
| 7 | 39 | (United States) Colt Nichols | Yamaha | 5 | 3 | 4 | 7 | 13 | 4 | 5 | 5 | 9 | 7 | 5 | 11 | 11 | 5 | 14 | 2 | 5 | 9 | 5 | 6 | Ret | | | | 292 |
| 8 | 36 | (United States) Michael Mosiman | Husqvarna | 7 | 11 | 8 | 11 | 4 | 3 | 7 | 8 | 3 | 5 | | | 10 | 7 | 21 | 8 | 7 | 3 | 6 | Ret | 5 | 14 | 5 | 5 | 290 |
| 9 | 12 | (United States) Shane McElrath | KTM | 14 | 8 | 15 | 10 | 8 | 10 | | | 11 | 13 | 6 | 7 | 12 | 9 | 4 | 5 | 14 | 10 | 8 | 5 | 1 | 1 | 8 | 9 | 285 |
| 10 | 196 | (Australia) Hunter Lawrence | Honda | 11 | 12 | Ret | 2 | 10 | 7 | 1 | 3 | 8 | 4 | 9 | 13 | 8 | 4 | 1 | 6 | | | | | 10 | 13 | | | 252 |
| 11 | 936 | (United States) Ty Masterpool | Yamaha | 12 | 14 | 12 | 17 | 6 | 16 | 19 | 18 | 16 | 16 | 8 | 15 | 4 | 11 | 11 | 13 | 12 | 15 | 11 | 13 | 7 | 11 | 10 | 12 | 206 |
| 12 | 45 | (United States) Brandon Hartranft | Yamaha | Ret | Ret | Ret | 13 | 16 | 14 | 14 | 14 | Ret | 9 | 7 | 8 | 6 | 12 | Ret | 12 | 9 | 12 | 10 | Ret | 15 | 7 | 15 | 11 | 174 |
| 13 | 44 | (United States) Cameron McAdoo | KTM | | | | | | | 8 | 7 | 15 | Ret | 11 | 6 | 9 | 10 | 9 | Ret | 6 | 8 | Ret | | 8 | 9 | 7 | 13 | 168 |
| 14 | 61 | (United States) Garrett Marchbanks | Kawasaki | 8 | 17 | 9 | 8 | 12 | 9 | Ret | | | | | | | | 10 | 9 | Ret | 19 | 13 | 9 | Ret | | 11 | 7 | 132 |
| 15 | 52 | (United States) Jordan Bailey | Husqvarna | 17 | 19 | 17 | 18 | Ret | | Ret | 15 | 10 | 12 | 15 | 18 | 14 | Ret | 19 | 16 | 15 | 16 | 15 | 11 | 11 | 15 | 13 | 15 | 119 |
| 16 | 55 | (United States) Kyle Peters | Suzuki | 16 | 16 | 27 | 20 | 18 | 20 | 17 | 16 | Ret | 14 | 16 | Ret | 7 | 20 | 17 | 15 | 19 | 14 | 17 | 14 | 14 | 19 | 17 | 24 | 94 |
| 17 | 66 | (United States) Mitchell Oldenburg | Yamaha | | | | | | | 10 | 19 | 12 | Ret | 19 | 14 | 15 | 13 | Ret | 14 | Ret | 11 | 9 | Ret | 16 | 10 | Ret | | 90 |
| 18 | 73 | (Ecuador) Martín Davalos | Kawasaki | 9 | Ret | 18 | 9 | 19 | 18 | 15 | 12 | 18 | 17 | 22 | Ret | | | | | | | 18 | 12 | 9 | Ret | Ret | 10 | 89 |
| 19 | 156 | (United States) Jacob Hayes | Yamaha | 18 | 21 | 14 | 16 | 17 | 15 | 16 | 24 | 13 | 8 | 12 | 9 | Ret | 14 | 23 | 18 | 32 | 17 | Ret | | | | | | 86 |
| 20 | 233 | (United States) Derek Drake | KTM | 10 | 25 | 13 | 12 | 22 | 13 | 11 | 17 | Ret | Ret | 21 | 23 | 23 | 21 | 18 | 17 | 10 | 18 | 14 | 16 | Ret | | | | 83 |
| 21 | 38 | (United States) Christian Craig | Honda | 13 | 10 | 6 | 15 | 15 | 19 | | | Ret | | | | | | Ret | 20 | 11 | 13 | | | | | | | 67 |
| 22 | 59 | (United States) Nick Gaines | Yamaha | 22 | 28 | Ret | 24 | 24 | Ret | 18 | 13 | 17 | Ret | 17 | 10 | 13 | 18 | 16 | Ret | | | Ret | 18 | 20 | 17 | 18 | Ret | 57 |
| 23 | 205 | (Australia) Wilson Todd | KTM | 15 | 9 | 29 | 14 | 14 | 17 | 12 | 10 | | | | | | | | | | | | | | | | | 56 |
| 24 | 28 | (United States) Jordon Smith | KTM | 19 | 13 | 16 | Ret | 11 | 8 | | | | | | | | | | | | | | | | | | | 38 |
| 25 | 123 | (United States) Mitchell Falk | KTM | Ret | | | | | | | | | | | | | | 8 | 19 | 17 | 21 | 27 | 17 | 21 | 16 | 16 | Ret | 33 |
| 26 | 496 | (Australia) Jett Lawrence | Honda | | | | | | | | | | | | | | | | | | | 21 | 8 | 24 | Ret | 12 | 14 | 29 |
| 27 | 374 | (Japan) Jo Shimoda | Honda | | | | | | | | | | | | | | | | | | | Ret | Ret | 13 | 12 | 14 | 16 | 29 |
| 28 | 346 | (United States) Kevin Moranz | Kawasaki | | | | | | | 28 | 27 | 21 | 15 | 24 | 16 | 18 | 19 | 12 | 21 | 18 | 22 | 24 | 25 | 22 | 22 | 26 | 21 | 28 |
| 29 | 78 | (Brazil) Ramyller Alves | KTM | | | | | | | | | Ret | 20 | 18 | 12 | 22 | 15 | 15 | Ret | 21 | 23 | Ret | Ret | 25 | 24 | 25 | | 25 |
| 30 | 194 | (United States) Jerry Robin | KTM | 21 | 18 | Ret | 28 | 20 | 21 | 21 | Ret | 22 | Ret | 14 | 17 | 16 | Ret | Ret | | | | 20 | Ret | 19 | 20 | 20 | Ret | 25 |
| 31 | 363 | (United States) Pierce Brown | KTM | | | | | | | | | 14 | 10 | | | | | | | | | | | | | | | 18 |
| 32 | 291 | (United States) Zane Merrett | KTM | 24 | 23 | 23 | 22 | 23 | 22 | 25 | 26 | 23 | 18 | Ret | 21 | 20 | 25 | 13 | Ret | 29 | 25 | 25 | Ret | 32 | 25 | 34 | 25 | 12 |
| 33 | 67 | (Brazil) Enzo Lopes | Suzuki | | | | | | | | | | | | | | | | | | | | | 17 | 18 | 19 | 18 | 12 |
| 34 | 112 | (United States) Thomas Covington | Husqvarna | 27 | 22 | 11 | 25 | 30 | 27 | | | | | | | | | | | | | | | 26 | Ret | 21 | 20 | 11 |
| 35 | 628 | (United States) Parker Mashburn | KTM | | | | | | | | | | | | | 17 | 16 | | | | | | | | | | | 9 |
| 36 | 285 | (United States) Marshal Weltin | Husqvarna | | | | | | | | | | | | | | | | | | | 19 | 15 | | | | | 8 |
| 37 | 40 | (United States) Sean Cantrell | KTM | | | | | | | | | | | | | | | 20 | Ret | 16 | 20 | Ret | 21 | 27 | Ret | | | 7 |
| 38 | 161 | (United States) Justin Thompson | Yamaha | | | | | | | 26 | 23 | 20 | 19 | 20 | 20 | 25 | 22 | | | | | 23 | 23 | 23 | 21 | 22 | 19 | 7 |
| 39 | 83 | (Switzerland) Killian Auberson | KTM | 28 | 15 | 22 | 23 | 25 | Ret | | | | | | | | | | | | | | | 33 | Ret | 29 | 23 | 6 |
| 40 | 822 | (United States) Carson Mumford | Honda | | | | | | | | | | | | | | | | | | | 16 | 20 | 31 | Ret | | | 6 |
| 41 | 667 | (United States) Jesse Flock | KTM | | | | | | | | | | | | | | | | | | | | | | | 23 | 17 | 4 |
| 42 | 89 | (United States) Joey Crown | Yamaha | | | | | | | | | | | | | Ret | 17 | | | | | | | | | | | 4 |
| 43 | 77 | (United States) Challen Tennant | KTM | Ret | 29 | 19 | 21 | Ret | | 20 | 20 | | | | | | | | | | | | | | | | | 4 |
| 44 | 72 | (Ecuador) Martín Castelo | Husqvarna | 20 | 26 | 20 | 19 | 21 | Ret | | | Ret | | | | | | | | | | | | | | | | 4 |
| 45 | 110 | (Japan) Yusuke Watanabe | Yamaha | 25 | Ret | Ret | | 26 | 23 | 24 | 21 | 19 | Ret | | | 24 | 26 | 26 | 26 | 20 | 29 | 26 | 22 | | | | | 3 |
| 46 | 352 | (United States) Jalek Swoll | Husqvarna | | | | | | | | | | | | | | | | | | | 22 | 19 | | | | | 2 |
| 47 | 610 | (United States) Hayden Halstead | Yamaha | | | | | | | | | | | 28 | 19 | 28 | Ret | | | | | | | | | | | 2 |
| 48 | 407 | (United States) Benjamin Nelko | Yamaha | 26 | 20 | | | 27 | 24 | 23 | 22 | 28 | 26 | | | Ret | 27 | | | | | 29 | 26 | | Ret | 30 | 26 | 1 |
| Pos | No | Rider | Bike | HAN (California) | | FOX (California) | | THU (Colorado) | | HIG (Pennsylvania) | | WWR (Florida) | | SOU (Massachusetts) | | RED (Michigan) | | SPR (Minnesota) | | WAS (Washington (state)) | | UNA (New York (state)) | | BUD (Maryland) | | IRN (Indiana) | | Points |
