= Shane McElrath =

American motocross racer (born 1994)

- Nationality: American
- Born: 11 August 1994 (age 32); Canton, North Carolina, U.S.
- Current team: Liqui Moly Beta Factory Racing
- Bike number: 12

Shane McElrath (born 11 August 1994) is an American professional Motocross and Supercross racer.

McElrath is a two-time FIM Supercross World Champion, winning the SX2 class in 2022 and 2024.

McElrath has ridden as a professional in the AMA Supercross Championship and AMA Motocross Championship since 2013. In this time, he has finished second twice in the 250SX West class and once in the 250SX East class.

In addition to his FIM World Championship titles, McElrath also won the SX2 class of the Australian Supercross Championship in 2024.

== Career ==
McElrath made his pro debut for the Troy Lee Designs Lucas Oil Honda team in the final three rounds of the 2013 AMA National Motocross Championship. He was retained for the following year by the team, where he made his debut in the AMA Supercross Championship. Competing in the 250SX West class, he recorded several top-ten finishes including a fifth in San Diego, with a final championship position of ninth. McElrath missed part of the 2014 AMA National Motocross Championship due to a hematoma sustained at the opening round. Despite this he was able to finish in 17th in the final standings with two tenth place finishes as his best results.

In 2015, McElrath stayed with the Troy Lee Designs team as they moved from Honda to KTM. McElrath finished in second place in that season's AMA Supercross Championship in the 250SX West class behind a dominant Cooper Webb, with two second places as his best results. With one third place at race two in Glen Helen, McElrath finished in ninth in the final 250 standings at the AMA National Motocross Championship for that year. A high point outdoors was that year's MXGP of USA, the final round of the 2015 FIM Motocross World Championship. McElrath qualified on pole after the winning the qualifying race in the MX2 class, before finishing in third and second in the grand prix races to finish second overall on his world championship debut.

McElrath switch to the 250SX East class in 2016, picking up two third places, on his way to seventh in the overall standings. His campaign outdoors resulted in his first overall podium in the AMA National Motocross Championship, with third overall at Muddy Creek in Tennessee. Unfortunately, an injury at round seven in Southwick ended his season. For 2017, McElrath moved back to the 250SX West class. The season started with him winning the first two rounds at Anaheim and San Diego, before his championship rival Justin Hill won the following four rounds. McElrath took another win at Salt Lake City, but ultimately finished the series as runner-up to Hill. In the 2017 AMA National Motocross Championship, he finished tenth in the final standings with an overall podium at the Budd's Creek round.

McElrath once again won the opening round of the season in the 250SX West championship at Anaheim in 2018. Another win at Salt Lake City later in the championship would secure him third in the final standings behind Aaron Plessinger and Adam Cianciarulo. The 2018 AMA National Motocross Championship would be McElrath's best motocross season up to that point, finishing fifth overall in the final standings in the 250 class. This included his first overall round win at Muddy Creek and his first individual race win in the second race at Washougal. There was one win for McElrath at the second Anaheim round of the 250SX West class in the 2019 AMA Supercross Championship. Unfortunately he was not able to finish the championship and ended in eighth overall. He finished ninth in the 250 standings in the 2019 AMA National Motocross Championship, where he won both races at the Budd's Creek round.

In 2020, McElrath moved away from the Troy Lee Designs team for the first time, as he signed with Star Racing Yamaha. This saw him switch back over to the 250SX East class for the 2020 AMA Supercross Championship, where he took three wins and five other podiums alongside. It would ultimately result in his third runner-up result in supercross, this time behind Chase Sexton. This would be coupled with a third place in the 250 standings in AMA motocross, where he picked up a race win and two overall podiums.

McElrath started his 450 career in 2021. He signed for the SmartTop Bullfrog Spas Honda team but unfortunately a shoulder injury pre-season meant that he missed the majority of his 450 debut supercross season. For 2022, McElrath signed for Rocky Mountain ATV/MC WPS KTM team for AMA Supercross and Motocross in the 450 class. McElrath improved as the season went on and began to post top-10 results, before the team folded after the second Detroit round. This left McElrath without a ride to complete the supercross series and race motocross in 2022. However, Rockstar Energy Husqvarna would sign McElrath for the 2022 AMA National Motocross Championship, as both of the team's main riders were out with injuries. A fifth place in the second race at Thunder Valley would be the highlight of this stint. With both injured riders returning at the Unadilla round, McElrath rode the final four rounds of the season for the Muc-Off FXR ClubMX Yamaha team.

Later in 2022, McElrath would be one of the riders signed up to race in the 2022 FIM Supercross World Championship, the first to take place after the demerging of the championship from the AMA Supercross series. Riding for Rick Ware Racing and dropping down to a 250 to race the SX2 class, McElrath was the overall winner of both rounds of the world championship, resulting in him being crowned FIM World Supercross Champion.

For 2023, McElrath signed to compete for the HEP Motorsports Suzuki team. He finished in eleventh overall in the 450SX class of the 2023 AMA Supercross Championship qualifying for all but one round with a best finish of fifth in Denver. McElrath began his defence of his SX2 world title with the Rick Ware Racing team by winning the opening round of the 2023 FIM Supercross World Championship in Great Britain. As several of the following rounds were ultimately cancelled, McElrath was able to compete in three rounds of the 2023 AMA National Motocross Championship, scoring points in four races. With only two rounds of the planned World Supercross calendar left after cancellations, McElrath lost his championship lead at the first of those. A bad qualifying at the Abu Dhabi round meant he started on the second row of a double stacked start line caused by the small size of the stadium. He was unable to come through the pack in the three races and entered the final round with a deficit of over thirty points to Max Anstie. After McElrath was not able to finish the first race in Melbourne, Anstie was crowned champion.

McElrath finished 13th in the final standings of the 2024 AMA Supercross Championship, qualifying and scoring points at all seventeen rounds. In the deep mud at the second round of the series, he was able to finish fourth, his best finish in the 450SX class to date. After the first eight rounds of the 2024 AMA National Motocross Championship, McElrath parted ways with the HEP Motorsports Suzuki team and moved to the MaddParts.com Kawasaki team for the final three rounds in a deal that also incorporated the 2025 season. Following the conclusion of the American season, McElrath joined the Fire Power Honda Racing team to compete in the 2024 FIM Supercross World Championship and the Australian Supercross Championship. With the reigning SX2 world champion Max Anstie only competing in the opening round of the championship as a wildcard, McElrath was able to win all four rounds of the series. This saw him regain the SX2 world title that he had lost in the previous season. In addition, McElrath was also able to win the SX2 class of the Australian series in the same period.

McElrath stayed with the same Honda team, renamed as Quadlock Honda Racing, for the 2025 AMA Supercross Championship. Building on good starts, McElrath became a consistent top-ten finisher by the end of the season. Alongside this he scored his first 450SX class podium with second place in the mud at Foxborough, Massachusetts, ending the series ninth in the final standings. Similarly to the previous season, McElrath rode the final three rounds of the 2025 AMA National Motocross Championship. Ensuring his qualification for the 2025 SuperMotocross World Championship playoffs, he ended the three-round series in 14th, with a best result of 11th at the final. McElrath entered the 2025 FIM Supercross World Championship as the defending champion in the SX2 class. With Max Anstie returning to the series full-time, McElrath struggled to match his pace across the first four rounds, before dominating the final round in South Africa. He ended the championship as runner-up for the second time in three years.

McElrath finished the 2026 AMA Supercross Championship in 13th in the overall standings, where a consistent season saw him record five top-ten finishes, including a sixth place at the fifteenth round. After not competing at any outdoor rounds, McElrath left the Quadlock Honda team for the Liqui Moly Beta Factory Racing team, ahead of the SuperMotocross playoff rounds. Beginning his two-year contract with the manufacturer in the playoff rounds of the 2026 SuperMotocross World Championship, McElrath finished fourteenth in the final standing. An eighth in the mud at the first playoff round gave him a top-ten on his debut with Beta.

== Honours ==
FIM Supercross World Championship

- SX2: 2022 & 2024 (gold) , 2023 & 2025 (silver)

AMA Supercross Championship

- 250SX East: 2020 (silver)
- 250SX West: 2015 & 2017 (silver) 2018 (bronze)

AMA Motocross Championship

- 250: 2020 (bronze)

Australian Supercross Championship

- SX2: 2024 (gold)

== Career statistics ==
=== FIM Supercross World Championship ===
==== By season ====
Season	Class	Number	Motorcycle	Team	Overall Wins	Overall Podium	Pts	Plcd
2022	SX2	12	Yamaha	Rick Ware Racing	2	2	123	1st
2023	SX2	1	Yamaha	Mobil 1 Rick Ware Racing	1	1	140	2nd
2024	SX2	12	Honda	Fire Power Honda Racing	4	4	398	1st
2025	SX2	1	Honda	Quad Lock Honda Racing	1	4	176	2nd

=== FIM Motocross World Championship ===
==== By season ====
Season	Class	Number	Motorcycle	Team	Race	Race Wins	Overall Wins	Race Top-3	Overall Podium	Pts	Plcd
2015	MX2	70	KTM	Troy Lee Designs Lucas Oil Red Bull KTM	2	0	0	2	1	42	29th

=== AMA Supercross Championship ===
==== By season ====
Season	Class	Number	Motorcycle	Team	Overall Wins	Overall Podium	Pts	Plcd
2014	250SX West	87	Honda	Troy Lee Designs Mav Tv Lucas Oil Honda	0	0	109	9th
2015	250SX West	40	KTM	Troy Lee Designs Lucas Oil Red Bull KTM	0	2	124	2nd
2016	250SX East	30	KTM	Troy Lee Designs Red Bull KTM	0	2	113	7th
2017	250SX West	38	KTM	Troy Lee Designs Red Bull KTM	3	6	164	2nd
2018	250SX West	28	KTM	Troy Lee Designs Red Bull KTM	2	5	193	3rd
2019	250SX West	12	KTM	Troy Lee Designs Red Bull KTM	1	3	123	8th
2020	250SX East	12	Yamaha	Monster Energy Star Racing Yamaha	3	8	209	2nd
2021	450SX	12	Honda	Smart Top Bullfrog Spas Honda	0	0	15	29th
2022	450SX	12	KTM	Rocky Mountain ATV/MC WPS KTM	0	0	101	18th
2023	450SX	12	Suzuki	Twisted Tea Suzuki Presented by Progressive Insurance	0	0	151	11th
2024	450SX	12	Suzuki	Twisted Tea Suzuki Presented by Progressive Insurance	0	0	132	13th
2025	450SX	12	Honda	Quadlock Honda Racing	0	1	192	9th
2026	450SX	12	Honda	Quadlock Honda Racing	0	0	150	13th
Total					9	27	1776	

=== AMA National Motocross Championship ===
==== By season ====
Season	Class	Number	Motorcycle	Team	Races	Race Wins	Overall Wins	Race Top-3	Overall Podium	Pts	Plcd
2013	250	127	Honda	Troy Lee Designs Lucas Oil Honda	6	0	0	0	0	24	26th
2014	250	87	Honda	Troy Lee Designs Mav Tv Lucas Oil Honda	12	0	0	0	0	90	17th
2015	250	40	KTM	Troy Lee Designs Lucas Oil Red Bull KTM	24	0	0	0	0	248	9th
2016	250	30	KTM	Troy Lee Designs Red Bull KTM	14	0	0	1	1	132	14th
2017	250	38	KTM	Troy Lee Designs Red Bull KTM	22	0	0	2	1	248	10th
2018	250	28	KTM	Troy Lee Designs Red Bull KTM	24	1	1	5	2	332	5th
2019	250	12	KTM	Troy Lee Designs Red Bull KTM	22	2	1	2	1	285	9th
2020	250	12	Yamaha	Monster Energy Star Racing Yamaha	18	1	0	4	2	288	3rd
2022	450	12	Husqvarna	Rockstar Energy Husqvarna Factory Racing	16	0	0	0	0	213	10th
2022	450	12	Yamaha	Muc-Off FXR Club MX	8	0	0	0	0	213	10th
2023	450	12	Yamaha	Rick Ware Racing Mobil 1	6	0	0	0	0	31	28th
2024	450	12	Suzuki	Twisted Tea Suzuki presented by Progressive Insurance	16	0	0	0	0	118	16th
2024	450	12	Kawasaki	MaddParts.com Kawasaki Race Team	6	0	0	0	0	118	16th
2025	450	12	Honda	Quadlock Honda Racing	6	0	0	0	0	29	29th
Total					200	4	2	14	7	2038	
