= 2024 FIM Supercross World Championship =

2024 Supercross World Championship season

The 2024 FIM Supercross World Championship was a supercross series sanctioned by the Fédération Internationale de Motocyclisme (FIM) as the world championship of the sport. This was the third season that the championship was organized by Australian promoter SX Global.

Ken Roczen was the reigning champion in the WSX class for 450cc motorcycles, whilst Max Anstie was the reigning champion in the SX2 class. Anstie only competed in the opening round as a wildcard, so did not defend his crown.

== Format Changes ==
Several format changes were brought in ahead of the season starting that would apply at each event.

SuperPole: Top four riders from the fifteen minute qualifying go to the SuperPole which determined the starting gate positions for the Main Events. Top three riders in the SuperPole scored championship points as follows:

Position	1st	2nd	3rd
Points	5	3	1

SuperFinal: The top eight riders from across the three Main Events in WSX and SX2 qualified for the SuperFinal at the end of the night. The SuperFinal allocated championship points to the finishers along the same scheme as for each Main Event.

== Calendar and results ==
The 2024 season had 4 events in Canada, Australia and United Arab Emirates.

Round	Date	Grand Prix	Location	Stadium	WSX Winner	SX2 Winner
1	26 October	(Canada) Canadian Grand Prix	Vancouver	BC Place	(United States) Eli Tomac	(United States) Shane McElrath
2	23 November	(Australia) Australian Grand Prix	Perth	HBF Park	(United States) Eli Tomac	(United States) Shane McElrath
3	24 November	(Australia) Australian Grand Prix	Perth	HBF Park	(United States) Eli Tomac	(United States) Shane McElrath
4	4 December	(United Arab Emirates) Abu Dhabi Grand Prix	Abu Dhabi	Etihad Arena	(Germany) Ken Roczen	(United States) Shane McElrath

== WSX ==
=== Entry list ===
Licensed Teams & Riders
Team	Constructor	No	Rider	Rounds
(United States) Progressive Insurance PMG Suzuki	Suzuki	1	(Germany) Ken Roczen	All
(United States) Progressive Insurance PMG Suzuki	Suzuki	6	(France) Thomas Ramette	4
(United States) Progressive Insurance PMG Suzuki	Suzuki	45	(United States) Colt Nichols	1–3
(Australia) Monster Energy CDR Yamaha Star Racing	Yamaha	3	(United States) Eli Tomac	All
(Australia) Monster Energy CDR Yamaha Star Racing	Yamaha	102	(Australia) Matt Moss	All
(United States) Smartop MotoConcepts Racing	Honda	4	(United States) Vince Friese	All
(United States) Smartop MotoConcepts Racing	Honda	21	(United States) Ryan Breece	All
(Australia) Fire Power Honda Racing	Honda	9	(Australia) Aaron Tanti	4
(Australia) Fire Power Honda Racing	Honda	15	(United Kingdom) Dean Wilson	1–3
(Australia) Fire Power Honda Racing	Honda	17	(United States) Joey Savatgy	All
(United States) Arby's Rick Ware Racing MX	Kawasaki	19	(Australia) Luke Clout	All
(United States) Arby's Rick Ware Racing MX	Kawasaki	48	(United States) Mitchell Oldenburg	All
(France) Team GSM HBI Dafy Michelin	Yamaha	20	(France) Grégory Aranda	All
(France) Team GSM HBI Dafy Michelin	Yamaha	692	(Spain) Ander Valentín	2–4
(France) Team GSM HBI Dafy Michelin	Yamaha	727	(France) Boris Maillard	1
(France) BUD Racing Kawasaki	Kawasaki	85	(France) Cédric Soubeyras	1
(France) BUD Racing Kawasaki	Kawasaki	137	(France) Adrien Escoffier	2–4
(France) BUD Racing Kawasaki	Kawasaki	945	(France) Anthony Bourdon	All
Wildcard Teams & Riders
(Brazil) KTM Racing Brasil	KTM	34	(Brazil) Lucas Dunka	1
(Canada) Partzilla PRMX Racing	Kawasaki	78	(United States) Cade Clason	1
(Australia) Boost Mobile Fire Power Honda HRC	Honda	96	(Australia) Kyle Webster	2–3
(Australia) KTM Racing Team	KTM	199	(Australia) Nathan Crawford	2–3

==== Riders Championship ====
Pos	Nr	Rider	Bike	CAN (Canada)				AUS (Australia)				AUS (Australia)				UAE (United Arab Emirates)				Points
1	3	(United States) Eli Tomac	Yamaha	2^{+3}	1	1	1	1^{+3}	1	1	1	1^{+5}	3	1	1	3^{+5}	2	2	1	397
2	1	(Germany) Ken Roczen	Suzuki	1^{+5}	11	2	2	2	3	2	2	3^{+3}	2	3	2	2^{+3}	1	1	2	354
3	17	(United States) Joey Savatgy	Honda	3^{+1}	2	3	5	4^{+5}	2	3	4	2	1	2	3	4^{+1}	4	3	3	328
4	4	(United States) Vince Friese	Honda	4	6	7	4	11	7	12	12	7	8	6	9	1	3	12	8	240
5	48	(United States) Mitchell Oldenburg	Kawasaki	8	4	6	8	12^{+1}	5	8	11	5	7	7	15	5	11	9	15	223
6	19	(Australia) Luke Clout	Kawasaki	15	5	15	DNQ	3	4	4	5	6	5	9	8	13	12	6	DNQ	191
7	20	(France) Grégory Aranda	Yamaha	7	7	8	16	16	6	5	DNQ	4^{+1}	6	5	7	DNS	DNS	DNS	DNQ	158
8	21	(United States) Ryan Breece	Honda	13	10	9	DNQ	10	12	14	DNQ	10	9	12	DNQ	7	6	4	11	153
9	945	(France) Anthony Bourdon	Kawasaki	9	12	10	DNQ	8	16	9	DNQ	8	10	11	DNQ	8	7	5	13	153
10	15	(United Kingdom) Dean Wilson	Honda	14	15	5	DNQ	5	9	6	3	14	4	4	16					148
11	102	(Australia) Matt Moss	Yamaha	6	8	11	11	9	10	7	DNQ	9	11	8	DNQ	6	13	DNS	DNQ	147
12	45	(United States) Colt Nichols	Suzuki	5	3	4	3	6	8	11	10	16	DNS	DNS	DNQ					128
13	137	(France) Adrien Escoffier	Kawasaki					14	13	15	DNQ	11	15	13	DNQ	9	5	7	12	102
14	692	(Spain) Ander Valentín	Yamaha					15	15	16	DNQ	15	14	15	DNQ	10	10	8	DNQ	71
15	96	(Australia) Kyle Webster	Honda					7	11	10	DNQ	13	13	10	DNQ					62
16	199	(Australia) Nathan Crawford	KTM					13	14	13	DNQ	12	12	14	DNQ					48
17	9	(Australia) Aaron Tanti	Honda													11	8	10	DNQ	34
18	727	(France) Boris Maillard	Honda	11	9	12	DNQ													31
19	6	(France) Thomas Ramette	Suzuki													12	9	11	DNQ	31
20	78	(United States) Cade Clason	Kawasaki	10	13	14	DNQ													26
21	34	(Brazil) Lucas Dunka	KTM	12	14	13	DNQ													24
	85	(France) Cédric Soubeyras	Honda	DNS	DNS	DNS	DNQ													0
Pos	Nr	Rider	Bike	CAN (Canada)				AUS (Australia)				AUS (Australia)				UAE (United Arab Emirates)				Points

== SX2 ==
=== Entry list ===
Licensed Teams & Riders
Team	Constructor	No	Rider	Rounds
(Australia) Fire Power Honda Racing	Honda	2	(Canada) Cole Thompson	All
(Australia) Fire Power Honda Racing	Honda	12	(United States) Shane McElrath	All
(United States) Smartop MotoConcepts Racing	Honda	7	(Canada) Noah Viney	All
(United States) Smartop MotoConcepts Racing	Honda	43	(United States) Cullin Park	All
(United States) Progressive Insurance PMG Suzuki	Suzuki	11	(United States) Kyle Chisholm	All
(United States) Progressive Insurance PMG Suzuki	Suzuki	58	(United States) Derek Kelley	All
(United States) Arby's Rick Ware Racing MX	Yamaha	16	(Brazil) Enzo Lopes	All
(United States) Arby's Rick Ware Racing MX	Yamaha	69	(United States) Coty Schock	All
(Australia) Monster Energy Yamalube CDR Yamaha	Yamaha	21	(Australia) Ryder Kingsford	All
(Australia) Monster Energy Yamalube CDR Yamaha	Yamaha	29	(United States) Phil Nicoletti	4
(Australia) Monster Energy Yamalube CDR Yamaha	Yamaha	41	(Australia) Kaleb Barham	1–2
(Australia) Monster Energy Yamalube CDR Yamaha	Yamaha	86	(Australia) Reid Taylor	3
(France) BUD Racing Kawasaki	Kawasaki	31	(France) Brice Maylin	All
(France) BUD Racing Kawasaki	Kawasaki	111	(France) Calvin Fonvieille	All
(France) Team GSM HBI Dafy Michelin	Yamaha	141	(France) Maxime Desprey	All
(France) Team GSM HBI Dafy Michelin	Yamaha	259	(France) Julien Lebeau	All
Wildcard Teams & Riders
(United States) Monster Energy CDR Yamaha Star Racing	Yamaha	1	(United Kingdom) Max Anstie	1
(Australia) KTM Racing Team	KTM	66	(Australia) Kayden Minear	2–3
(Canada) Partzilla PRMX Racing	Kawasaki	73	(United States) Preston Boespflug	1
(Australia) Empire Kawasaki	Kawasaki	86	(Australia) Reid Taylor	2

==== Riders Championship ====
Pos	Nr	Rider	Bike	CAN (Canada)				AUS (Australia)				AUS (Australia)				UAE (United Arab Emirates)				Points
1	12	(United States) Shane McElrath	Honda	7	1	1	6	2^{+5}	1	1	6	1^{+5}	1	2	4	1^{+5}	1	1	4	398
2	69	(United States) Coty Schock	Kawasaki	4^{+1}	3	6	9	1	5	2	8	5	4	1	6	3	12	5	5	303
3	2	(Canada) Cole Thompson	Honda	3^{+3}	4	3	10	4^{+3}	3	4	9	7^{+3}	5	4	11	4^{+3}	3	3	7	302
4	16	(Brazil) Enzo Lopes	Yamaha	5	5	2	7	3^{+1}	2	3	7	2^{+1}	3	13	5	14^{+1}	4	9	6	292
5	141	(France) Maxime Desprey	Yamaha	13	9	7	DNQ	5	8	5	16	3	6	5	13	5	2	2	9	233
6	43	(United States) Cullin Park	Honda	6	6	16	DNQ	7	4	6	14	8	2	3	10	2	5	14	10	230
7	11	(United States) Kyle Chisholm	Suzuki	8	7	4	14	6	9	10	13	11	7	6	14	10	9	8	DNQ	201
8	21	(Australia) Ryder Kingsford	Yamaha	2	14	14	12	15	6	9	DNQ	DNS	DNS	DNS	DNQ	11	10	4	16	137
9	31	(France) Brice Maylin	Kawasaki	10	13	8	DNQ	14	12	13	DNQ	9	9	9	DNQ	6	6	13	DNQ	130
10	111	(France) Calvin Fonvieille	Kawasaki	14	8	11	DNQ	10	14	8	DNQ	12	11	10	DNQ	7	13	6	DNQ	128
11	58	(United States) Derek Kelley	Suzuki	9	11	10	DNQ	11	15	DNS	DNQ	10	13	8	DNQ	8	7	11	DNQ	118
12	66	(Australia) Kayden Minear	KTM					8	10	7	15	4	10	7	12					96
13	7	(Canada) Noah Viney	Honda	16	12	12	DNQ	9	11	11	DNQ	14	8	11	DNQ	12	14	12	DNQ	110
14	259	(France) Julien Lebeau	Yamaha	15	15	13	DNQ	13	13	12	DNQ	13	12	12	DNQ	13	11	10	DNQ	100
15	1	(United Kingdom) Max Anstie	Yamaha	1^{+5}	2	9	13													79
16	29	(United States) Phil Nicoletti	Yamaha													9	8	7	14	53
17	41	(Australia) Kaleb Barham	Yamaha	11	10	5	15	DNS	DNS	DNS	DNQ									50
18	86	(Australia) Reid Taylor	Kawasaki					12	7	DNS	DNQ									44
18	86	(Australia) Reid Taylor	Yamaha									6	14	DNS	DNQ					44
19	73	(United States) Preston Boespflug	Kawasaki	12	16	15	DNQ													20
Pos	Nr	Rider	Bike	CAN (Canada)				AUS (Australia)				AUS (Australia)				UAE (United Arab Emirates)				Points
