= Australian Supercross Championship =

National sporting competition for the sport of Supercross

Fox Australian Supercross Championship
- Category: Motorcycle racing
- Country: Australia
- Inaugural season: 2015
- Classes: SX1 (450cc); SX2 (250cc); SX3 (250cc futures); KTM Junior 85cc; KTM Junior 65cc
- Constructors: Gas Gas; Honda; Husqvarna; Kawasaki; KTM; Yamaha
- Riders' champion: (United States) Joey Savatgy (SX1) (United States) Shane McElrath (SX2)
- Teams' champion: Team HRC Australia
- Official website: www.australiansupercross.com.au

The Australian Supercross Championship was inaugurated in 2015, following on from various series of this discipline of stadium motocross dating back to the late 1970s. The series is usually held over 4-5 rounds across various major stadiums, and takes place in spring and early summer, from October to December, and is sanctioned by Motorcycling Australia.

== History ==
The first Supercross race in Australia was held in 1978, six years after the inaugural 'Super Bowl of Motocross' in Los Angeles, at Sydney's Parramatta Raceway, between stars of the Mr Motocross series. There have been many Supercross series run in Australia in the past, including the Supercross Masters and the Australian Championships. Early Australian stars of the sport included Craig Dack, Glen Bell and Mark Kirkman.

The two series ran in tandem in the 1990s, when the sport reached its initial peak. Races were held in locations across the country, from arenas such as the Sydney Entertainment Centre to regional towns such as Griffith, Gosford and Wollongong. Towards the end of the 1990s the series unearthed Chad Reed, a future American and World Champion.

In the 2000s the series were consolidated into the Super X series, which lasted until 2014. The Australian Supercross Championship began in 2015, with the flagship season finale AUS-X Open beginning in the same year, with the inaugural event held at Qudos Bank Arena.

The 2020 and 2021 editions of the series were both cancelled due to the COVID-19 pandemic.

American action sports clothing brand Fox Racing was named the title sponsor of the series in 2021.

== Calendar ==
The series incorporates the AUS-X OPEN which also doubles as the first leg of the Oceania Supercross Championship (the second being the SX Open in Auckland), and the Australian Grand Prix of the FIM Supercross World Championship.

== Broadcast ==
As of 2023, the series is broadcast in Australia by the 7plus streaming service of the Seven Network, with occasional races shown on the 7mate broadcast channel.

Previous broadcast partners included Fox Sports, SBS and 10 Bold.

== Champions ==
American Justin Brayton has dominated the series in recent years, winning multiple titles.

List of Australian Supercross Champions
Season	SX1 (450cc)	SX2 (250cc)
2025	(United Kingdom) Dean Wilson (Quad Lock Honda)	(Australia) Ryder Kingsford (Monster Energy Yamalube Yamaha)
2024	(United States) Joey Savatgy (Fire Power Honda)	(United States) Shane McElrath (Fire Power Honda)
2023	(United Kingdom) Dean Wilson (Boost Mobile HRC Honda)	(United Kingdom) Max Anstie (Boost Mobile HRC Honda)
2022	(United States) Justin Brayton (Team HRC Honda)	(United Kingdom) Max Anstie (Team HRC Honda)
2020-21 Cancelled due to COVID-19 Pandemic
2019	(United States) Justin Brayton (Penrite Honda)	(United States) Chris Blose (CDR Yamaha)
2018	(United States) Justin Brayton (Penrite Honda)	(Australia) Jay Wilson (CDR Yamaha)
2017	(United States) Justin Brayton (Penrite Honda)	(Australia) Jackson Richardson (Monster Kawasaki)
2016	(United States) Justin Brayton (Honda Genuine)	(Australia) Jackson Richardson (Monster Kawasaki)
2015	(Australia) Daniel Reardon (CDR Yamaha)	(United States) Jimmy Decotis (Honda Genuine)

== Supercross Masters Champions ==
=== 250cc/SX1 Champions (1981-2007) ===
- 1981: (United States) Broc Glover
- 1982: (Australia) Jeff Liesk
- 1983: (United States) Danny LaPorte
- 1984: (United States) Jimmy Ellis
- 1985: (United States) Jim Holley
- 1986: (United States) Jo Jo Keller
- 1987: (Australia) James Deakin
- 1988: (United States) Jim Holley
- 1989: (Australia) Glen Bell
- 1990: (Australia) Craig Dack
- 1991: (Australia) Eddie Warren
- 1992: (Australia) Anthony Gobert

Joint Supercross Masters / Australian Champions

- 1993: (Australia) Glen Bell
- 1994: (Australia) Kim Ashkenazi
- 1995: (Australia) Eddie Warren
- 1996: (Australia) Peter Melton
- 1997: (Australia) Craig Anderson
- 1998: (Australia) Craig Anderson
- 1999: (Australia) Michael Byrne
- 2000: (Australia) Andrew McFarlane
- 2001: (Australia) Craig Anderson
- 2002: (Australia) Craig Anderson
- 2003: (Australia) Jay Marmont
- 2004: (Australia) Troy Carroll
- 2005: (Australia) Troy Carroll
- 2006: (Australia) Dan Reardon
- 2007: (Australia) Troy Carroll

=== 125cc/SX2 Champions (1990-2007) ===
- 1990: (United States) Eddie Warren
- 1991: (Australia) Anthony Gobert
- 1992: (Australia) Stan Burgin
- 1993: (Australia) Joel Elliott
- 1994:
- 1995:
- 1996: (Australia) Troy Carroll
- 1997: (Australia) Troy Carroll
- 1998: (Australia) Craig Carmichael
- 1999: (Australia) Troy Dorron
- 2000: (Australia) Brett Metcalfe
- 2001: (Australia) Troy Carroll
- 2002: (Australia) Troy Carroll
- 2003: (Australia) Troy Carroll
- 2004: (Australia) Cameron Taylor
- 2005: (Australia) Dan Reardon
- 2006: (Australia) Ryan Marmont
- 2007: (Australia) Lawson Bopping

== See also ==
- ProMX
- Motorcycling Australia
