= 2022 FIM Supercross World Championship =

2022 world championship season

The 2022 FIM Supercross World Championship was a supercross series sanctioned by the FIM as the world championship of the sport. This was the first season that the championship was organized by Australian promoter SX Global as it moved away from being merged with the America-based AMA Supercross Championship.

== Calendar and results ==
The 2022 season is scheduled to have 2 events in Great Britain and Australia.

| Round | Date | Grand Prix | Location | Stadium | WSX Winner | SX2 Winner |
|---|---|---|---|---|---|---|
| 1 | 8 October | (United Kingdom) British Grand Prix | Cardiff | Principality Stadium | (United States) Eli Tomac | (United States) Shane McElrath |
| 2 | 21–22 October | (Australia) Australian Grand Prix | Melbourne | Marvel Stadium | (United States) Joey Savatgy | (United States) Shane McElrath |

== WSX ==
=== Entry list ===
Licensed Teams & Riders
| Team | Constructor | No | Rider | Rounds |
|---|---|---|---|---|
| (United States) Motoconcepts Honda | Honda | 10 | (United States) Justin Brayton | All |
| (United States) Motoconcepts Honda | Honda | 19 | (United States) Vince Friese | All |
| (United States) Rick Ware Racing | Yamaha | 14 | (United States) Ryan Breece | All |
| (United States) Rick Ware Racing | Kawasaki | 17 | (United States) Joey Savatgy | All |
| (Australia) Honda Genuine Honda Racing | Honda | 15 | (United Kingdom) Dean Wilson | All |
| (Australia) Honda Genuine Honda Racing | Honda | 94 | (Germany) Ken Roczen | All |
| (Australia) Monster Energy CDR Yamaha | Yamaha | 18 | (Australia) Luke Clout | All |
| (Australia) Monster Energy CDR Yamaha | Yamaha | 75 | (United States) Josh Hill | All |
| (United States) MDK Motorsports | KTM | 22 | (Australia) Chad Reed | 1 |
| (United States) MDK Motorsports | Honda | 30 | (Australia) Joel Wightman | 2 |
| (United States) MDK Motorsports | Honda | 33 | (United States) Josh Grant | 1 |
| (United States) MDK Motorsports | Kawasaki | 57 | (Australia) Jackson Richardson | 2 |
| (France) Team GSM Dafy Michelin | Yamaha | 26 | (France) Thomas Ramette | All |
| (France) Team GSM Dafy Michelin | Yamaha | 945 | (France) Anthony Bourdon | All |
| (United States) Twisted Tea PMG Suzuki | Suzuki | 60 | (United States) Justin Starling | 1 |
| (United States) Twisted Tea PMG Suzuki | Suzuki | 61 | (Sweden) Fredrik Noren | All |
| (United States) Twisted Tea PMG Suzuki | Suzuki | 140 | (United States) Alex Ray | 2 |
| (United States) Muc-Off / FXR / ClubMX | Yamaha | 65 | (United States) Grant Harlan | All |
| (United States) Muc-Off / FXR / ClubMX | Yamaha | 78 | (United States) Cade Clason | All |
| (France) BUD Racing | Kawasaki | 85 | (France) Cédric Soubeyras | All |
| (France) BUD Racing | Kawasaki | 137 | (France) Adrien Escoffier | All |
| (Italy) Honda NILS | Honda | 911 | (France) Jordi Tixier | All |
| (Italy) Honda NILS | Honda | 941 | (Italy) Angelo Pellegrini | All |
Wildcard Teams & Riders
| (United States) Monster Energy Star Racing Yamaha | Yamaha | 3 | (United States) Eli Tomac | 1 |
| GasGas Racing Team Australia | Gas Gas | 45 | (Australia) Hayden Mellross | 2 |
| Team HRC Australia | Honda | 96 | (Australia) Kyle Webster | 2 |
| (United Kingdom) ASA United GasGas | Gas Gas | 155 | (United Kingdom) Jack Brunell | 1 |

==== Riders Championship ====
| Pos | Nr | Rider | Bike | GBR (United Kingdom) | | | AUS (Australia) | | | Points |
|---|---|---|---|---|---|---|---|---|---|---|
| 1 | 94 | (Germany) Ken Roczen | Honda | 3 | 2 | 4 | 1 | 15 | 2 | 116 |
| 2 | 17 | (United States) Joey Savatgy | Kawasaki | 19 | 5 | 2 | 2 | 1 | 1 | 112 |
| 3 | 19 | (United States) Vince Friese | Honda | 2 | 3 | 5 | 4 | 3 | 5 | 112 |
| 4 | 10 | (United States) Justin Brayton | Honda | 4 | 6 | 3 | 3 | 2 | 8 | 108 |
| 5 | 75 | (United States) Josh Hill | Yamaha | 5 | 7 | 7 | 6 | 17 | 3 | 83 |
| 6 | 3 | (United States) Eli Tomac | Yamaha | 1 | 1 | 1 | | | | 76 |
| 7 | 85 | (France) Cédric Soubeyras | Kawasaki | 12 | 4 | 6 | 16 | 10 | 7 | 72 |
| 8 | 911 | (France) Jordi Tixier | Honda | 15 | 12 | 9 | 7 | 6 | 9 | 68 |
| 9 | 945 | (France) Anthony Bourdon | Yamaha | 14 | 15 | 10 | 10 | 5 | 10 | 62 |
| 10 | 137 | (France) Adrien Escoffier | Kawasaki | 11 | 8 | 12 | 8 | 14 | 13 | 60 |
| 11 | 78 | (United States) Cade Clason | Yamaha | 17 | 11 | 17 | 12 | 4 | 6 | 60 |
| 12 | 941 | (Italy) Angelo Pellegrini | Honda | 6 | 13 | 8 | 9 | 9 | Ret | 60 |
| 13 | 15 | (United Kingdom) Dean Wilson | Honda | 8 | 18 | 19 | 5 | 16 | 4 | 57 |
| 14 | 26 | (France) Thomas Ramette | Yamaha | 7 | 10 | 14 | 13 | 13 | Ret | 48 |
| 15 | 14 | (United States) Ryan Breece | Yamaha | 10 | 14 | 13 | 14 | 18 | 14 | 43 |
| 16 | 65 | (United States) Grant Harlan | Yamaha | 16 | 17 | 15 | 15 | 8 | 12 | 43 |
| 17 | 61 | (Sweden) Fredrik Noren | Suzuki | 13 | 9 | 11 | 20 | Ret | Ret | 31 |
| 18 | 45 | (Australia) Hayden Mellross | Gas Gas | | | | 11 | 12 | 11 | 29 |
| 19 | 155 | (United Kingdom) Jack Brunell | Gas Gas | 9 | 16 | 16 | | | | 22 |
| 20 | 57 | (Australia) Jackson Richardson | Kawasaki | | | | 18 | 11 | 15 | 19 |
| 21 | 96 | (Australia) Kyle Webster | Kawasaki | | | | 17 | 7 | Ret | 18 |
| 22 | 60 | (United States) Justin Starling | Suzuki | 18 | 19 | 18 | | | | 8 |
| 23 | 140 | (United States) Alex Ray | Suzuki | | | | 19 | DNS | DNS | 2 |
| 24 | 18 | (Australia) Luke Clout | Yamaha | 20 | DNS | DNS | DNS | DNS | DNS | 1 |
| | 22 | (Australia) Chad Reed | KTM | DNS | DNS | DNS | | | | 0 |
| | 33 | (United States) Josh Grant | Honda | DNS | DNS | DNS | | | | 0 |
| | 30 | (Australia) Joel Wightman | Honda | | | | DNS | DNS | DNS | 0 |
| Pos | Nr | Rider | Bike | GBR (United Kingdom) | | | AUS (Australia) | | | Points |

==== Manufacturers Championship ====
| Pos | Brand | GBR (United Kingdom) | | | AUS (Australia) | | | Points |
|---|---|---|---|---|---|---|---|---|
| 1 | Honda | 2 | 2 | 3 | 1 | 2 | 2 | 135 |
| 2 | Yamaha | 1 | 1 | 1 | 6 | 4 | 3 | 128 |
| 3 | Kawasaki | 11 | 4 | 2 | 2 | 1 | 1 | 122 |
| 4 | Gas Gas | 9 | 16 | 16 | 11 | 12 | 11 | 51 |
| 5 | Suzuki | 13 | 9 | 11 | 19 | Ret | Ret | 32 |
| | KTM | DNS | DNS | DNS | | | | 0 |
| Pos | Brand | GBR (United Kingdom) | | | AUS (Australia) | | | Points |

== SX2 ==
=== Entry list ===
Licensed Teams & Riders
| Team | Constructor | No | Rider | Rounds |
|---|---|---|---|---|
| (Australia) Monster Energy CDR Yamaha | Yamaha | 11 | (United States) Kyle Chisholm | All |
| (Australia) Monster Energy CDR Yamaha | Yamaha | 19 | (Australia) Aaron Tanti | All |
| (United States) Rick Ware Racing | Yamaha | 12 | (United States) Shane McElrath | All |
| (United States) Rick Ware Racing | Yamaha | 45 | (United States) Henry Miller | All |
| (Australia) Honda Genuine Honda Racing | Honda | 20 | (Australia) Wilson Todd | All |
| (Australia) Honda Genuine Honda Racing | Honda | 99 | (United Kingdom) Max Anstie | All |
| (United States) Twisted Tea PMG Suzuki | Suzuki | 40 | (United States) Dilan Schwartz | All |
| (United States) Twisted Tea PMG Suzuki | Suzuki | 74 | (United States) Derek Kelley | All |
| (United States) Motoconcepts Honda | Honda | 48 | (United States) Mitchell Oldenburg | All |
| (United States) Motoconcepts Honda | Honda | 200 | (United States) Cole Seely | All |
| (France) BUD Racing | Kawasaki | 66 | (United States) Chris Blose | All |
| (France) BUD Racing | Kawasaki | 102 | (Australia) Matt Moss | All |
| (United States) MDK Motorsports | KTM | 79 | (United States) Derek Drake | All |
| (United States) MDK Motorsports | KTM | 891 | (United States) Justin Bogle | All |
| (France) Team GSM Dafy Michelin | Yamaha | 141 | (France) Maxime Desprey | All |
| (France) Team GSM Dafy Michelin | Yamaha | 910 | (United States) Carson Brown | All |
| (Italy) Honda NILS | Honda | 384 | (Italy) Lorenzo Camporese | All |
| (Italy) Honda NILS | Honda | 773 | (France) Thomas Do | All |
| (United States) Muc-Off / FXR / ClubMX | Yamaha | 401 | (United States) Jace Owen | All |
| (United States) Muc-Off / FXR / ClubMX | Yamaha | 715 | (United States) Phil Nicoletti | All |
Wildcard Teams & Riders
| (Australia) Yamalube Yamaha Racing Team | Yamaha | 22 | (Australia) Rhys Budd | 2 |
| (United Kingdom) Revo Seven Kawasaki | Kawasaki | 53 | (New Zealand) Dylan Walsh | 1 |
| KTM Racing Team Australia | KTM | 199 | (Australia) Nathan Crawford | 2 |
| (United Kingdom) SR75 World Team Suzuki | Suzuki | 275 | (United Kingdom) Dylan Woodcock | 1 |

==== Riders Championship ====
| Pos | Nr | Rider | Bike | GBR (United Kingdom) | | | AUS (Australia) | | | Points |
|---|---|---|---|---|---|---|---|---|---|---|
| 1 | 12 | (United States) Shane McElrath | Yamaha | 4 | 3 | 5 | 2 | 2 | 1 | 123 |
| 2 | 99 | (United Kingdom) Max Anstie | Honda | 11 | 1 | 10 | 1 | 3 | 2 | 114 |
| 3 | 66 | (United States) Chris Blose | Kawasaki | 2 | 4 | 8 | 4 | 5 | 4 | 105 |
| 4 | 19 | (Australia) Aaron Tanti | Yamaha | 7 | 9 | 3 | 12 | 1 | 3 | 100 |
| 5 | 48 | (United States) Mitchell Oldenburg | Honda | 1 | 19 | 1 | 7 | 4 | 6 | 99 |
| 6 | 910 | (United States) Carson Brown | Yamaha | 6 | 7 | 4 | 8 | 7 | 19 | 76 |
| 7 | 20 | (Australia) Wilson Todd | Honda | 13 | 5 | 12 | 6 | 13 | 7 | 70 |
| 8 | 141 | (France) Maxime Desprey | Yamaha | 12 | 2 | 14 | 10 | 15 | 8 | 68 |
| 9 | 102 | (Australia) Matt Moss | Kawasaki | 3 | Ret | 11 | 20 | 6 | 5 | 62 |
| 10 | 715 | (United States) Phil Nicoletti | Yamaha | 10 | 13 | 15 | 5 | 12 | 12 | 59 |
| 11 | 41 | (United States) Derek Kelley | Suzuki | 9 | 6 | 7 | 16 | 17 | 13 | 58 |
| 12 | 384 | (Italy) Lorenzo Camporese | Honda | 8 | 18 | 16 | 9 | 14 | 14 | 47 |
| 13 | 45 | (United States) Henry Miller | Yamaha | 14 | 15 | 17 | 13 | 10 | 10 | 47 |
| 14 | 40 | (United States) Dilan Schwartz | Suzuki | 15 | 14 | 18 | 15 | 9 | 9 | 46 |
| 15 | 401 | (United States) Jace Owen | Yamaha | 19 | 12 | 9 | 3 | 20 | DNS | 44 |
| 16 | 891 | (United States) Justin Bogle | KTM | Ret | 8 | 6 | 11 | Ret | DNS | 38 |
| 17 | 200 | (United States) Cole Seely | Honda | 17 | 20 | 2 | Ret | 18 | 17 | 35 |
| 18 | 53 | (New Zealand) Dylan Walsh | Kawasaki | 5 | 10 | 19 | | | | 29 |
| 19 | 11 | (United States) Kyle Chisholm | Yamaha | Ret | 17 | 13 | 19 | 11 | 18 | 27 |
| 20 | 199 | (Australia) Nathan Crawford | KTM | | | | 17 | 8 | 16 | 22 |
| 21 | 22 | (Australia) Rhys Budd | Yamaha | | | | 14 | 16 | 11 | 22 |
| 22 | 773 | (France) Thomas Do | Honda | 16 | Ret | 20 | 18 | 19 | 15 | 17 |
| 23 | 79 | (United States) Derek Drake | KTM | 20 | 11 | Ret | DNS | DNS | DNS | 11 |
| 24 | 275 | (United Kingdom) Dylan Woodcock | Suzuki | 18 | 16 | 21 | | | | 8 |
| Pos | Nr | Rider | Bike | GBR (United Kingdom) | | | AUS (Australia) | | | Points |

==== Manufacturers Championship ====
| Pos | Brand | GBR (United Kingdom) | | | AUS (Australia) | | | Points |
|---|---|---|---|---|---|---|---|---|
| 1 | Honda | 1 | 1 | 1 | 1 | 3 | 2 | 142 |
| 2 | Yamaha | 4 | 2 | 3 | 2 | 1 | 1 | 132 |
| 3 | Kawasaki | 2 | 4 | 8 | 4 | 5 | 4 | 105 |
| 4 | Suzuki | 9 | 6 | 7 | 15 | 9 | 9 | 71 |
| 5 | KTM | 20 | 8 | 6 | 11 | 8 | 16 | 57 |
| Pos | Brand | GBR (United Kingdom) | | | AUS (Australia) | | | Points |
