= Joey Savatgy =

American motocross racer (born 1994)

- Nationality: American
- Born: 19 February 1994 (age 32); Thomasville, Georgia, U.S.
- Current team: Quadlock Honda Racing
- Bike number: 17

Joey Savatgy (born 19 February 1994) is an American professional motocross and Supercross racer. Savatgy is a five-time winner in the 250 classes of the AMA Supercross Championship, finishing second in the 250SX West class in 2016.

Savatgy turned professional at the beginning of the 2013 season, and between 2015 to 2018, competed for the Monster Energy Pro Circuit Kawasaki, where he achieved his best results aboard a 250cc motorcycle. Alongside his supercross results, he has seven overall wins in the AMA Motocross Championship, finishing third in the 250 class overall standings in 2015 and 2016.

Outside of America, Savatgy has been successful in the WSX class of the FIM Supercross World Championship, taking two overall Grand Prix wins and finishing runner-up in the series in 2022, 2023 and 2025.

In 2024, Savatgy became champion in the SX1 class of the Australian Supercross Championship.

Before turning professional, Savatgy became the 2011 FIM Motocross Junior World Champion in the 125cc class.

== Career ==
=== Junior career ===
Savatgy worked his way through the ranks of the American amateur system, appearing at the AMA Amateur National Motocross Championship for the first time in 2005. At the 2008 edition of the event, Savatgy won two titles whilst riding an 85cc Honda. Upon moving up to a 125cc motorcycle, he became part of the Rockstar Energy Suzuki Amateur team - a move that would see him win the Schoolboy 2 class at the 2010 edition of the event. In the same season, Savatgy represented his country at the FIM Motocross Junior World Championship for the first time, where he led both main races and eventually took home the silver medal behind champion Jordi Tixier.

Savatgy returned to the FIM Junior World Championship in 2011, where by recording two second place finishes he was able to become World Champion in the 125cc class. His final season as an amateur would come in 2012, which was highlighted by picking up two third place finishes at the AMA Amateur National Motocross Championship.

=== 250 Career ===
Savatgy left Suzuki to make his professional debut with the JDR J-Star KTM Racing Team in 2013. Starting his rookie season in the 250SX West class of the AMA Supercross Championship, he recorded six top-ten finished to eventually end the championship ninth in the final standings. These performances saw Savatgy awarded the 2013 Supercross Rookie of the Year award. The JDR team collapsed at the end of the supercross season and Savatgy signed a last minute deal with the FMF Orange Brigade KTM team to race in the AMA Motocross Championship for the first time. He again adapted quickly to the class, scoring a fifth place in the second race at the fourth round. Savatgy then sustained a broken wrist at the sixth round which saw him ruled out for the rest of the championship.

Savatgy signed for the Rockstar Energy Racing team for the 2014 season but would miss the entire supercross season due to a number of injuries he sustained in a pre-season crash. Savatgy returned for the 2014 AMA Motocross season, where he improved as the season progressed by scoring five top-ten overall finishes in the last five rounds. Included within this was his first podium as a professional rider, when he finished second overall at the penultimate round. Following this results, Savatgy was picked up by the Monster Energy Pro Circuit Kawasaki team for 2015. In the 250SX East class of the AMA Supercross Championship, he started the season by achieving his first professional supercross podium by finishing third at the opening round. Savatgy finished on the bottom step of the podium in each of the last three rounds to finish fourth in the final standings. He was similarly competitive in the 2015 AMA Motocross season, scoring four podiums including his first overall professional motocross win at Unadilla to finish third in the final standings.

Savatgy had a strong start to the 2016 supercross season, finishing as the runner-up at the second round before taking his first professional supercross win at the fourth round in Oakland. This combined with a non-finish by Cooper Webb gave Savatgy the championship lead. With a third place at the following round behind Webb, the championship lead became tied but swung back to Savatgy when he took his second win at the sixth round in San Diego. With only being able to finish tenth at the following round, he lost the lead to Webb again and with a third at the penultimate round he went into the final sixteen points behind. Despite this, Savatgy was able to win the final round in Las Vegas and with Webb finishing eleventh, he finished runner-up in the 250SX West class by a single point. The following outdoor season started similarly strongly for Savatgy, where he won the opening round of the 250 class by winning both races. He would go on to take two more overall wins at the third and fourth rounds, before finishing second overall at the fifth round. He would, however, lose the championship lead at the following round and eventually finish third in the standings after not picking up any further overall podiums or race wins.

Savatgy began the 2017 season by competing in the 250SX East class in supercross, taking a win at the opening round in Minneapolis. He scored four further podiums throughout the season and went into the final round one point off the championship lead in a tight three-way championship battle. In the final lap of a chaotic race, Savatgy was involved in an incident with eventual champion Zach Osborne, for which Osborne was later fined. In the 2017 AMA National Motocross Championship, Savatgy was able to take three overall wins and four race wins. After missing the last two rounds due to a foot injury, he finished the season in fifth in the final standings. Savatgy again started strong in the 2018 supercross season and tied for the championship lead after winning the third round of the 250SX West class. He would drop to third after the following round and with two more podiums throughout the season finished fourth in the final standings. Following this, he was less successful in the 2018 AMA National Motocross Championship than he had been in previous seasons, with a single race win and third overall at the ninth round being the highlight.

=== 450 Career ===
Towards the end of the 2018 season, it was announced that Savatgy would join Kawasaki's factory team in the 450 class. He made his 450 debut at the Monster Energy Cup, where he surprised many by finishing third overall. The event saw Savatgy leading the final race before letting new teammate Eli Tomac past on the last lap so he could take the overall win. He made his full-time 450 debut in the 2019 AMA Supercross Championship, where he scored six top-six finishes with a best of fourth in Minneapolis. At the final round, he crashed during qualifying and sustained a hematoma in his leg that stopped him competing in the main event. Despite this, he was still able to pick up the 2019 Rookie of the Year award in the 450SX class. Due to the recovery from the hematoma and other injuries that had been picked up, Savatgy missed the first two rounds of the 2019 AMA National Motocross Championship. After he returned, he was able to score several top-six finishes and at the final round had his best result with fourth overall.

After the conclusion of the 2019 season, it was announced that Savatgy would not continue with the factory Kawasaki team, instead joining the JGR Yoshimura Suzuki Factory Racing team. He debuted with the team at the Paris Supercross event in November 2019 and went on to compete in the AUS-X Open series after this. Whilst racing in Australia, Savatgy had a crash causing a broken heel and navicular bone. This ultimately ruled him out of the entire 2020 AMA Supercross Championship, with him returning for the start of the 2020 AMA National Motocross Championship. He was able to secure five top-ten overall finishes across the championship to finish eleventh in the final standings. At the end of the season, the JGR team closed its doors and Savatgy joined the Rocky Mountain ATV/MC KTM team for 2021. He completed the full 2021 AMA Supercross Championship, scoring eight top-ten finishes to end the season in tenth overall. Following this, Savatgy was a consistent top-ten finisher in the 2021 AMA National Motocross Championship - including a sixth overall at the ninth round, as he finished eighth in the final standings.

Staying with the Rocky Mountain team, Savatgy only competed in the opening two rounds of the 2022 AMA Supercross Championship due to a knee injury. After the team folded after the end of the supercross season, Savatgy was signed to return to the Monster Energy Kawasaki team as a replacement rider in the 2022 AMA National Motocross Championship. The return to the factory Kawasaki team saw some of his best results outdoors on a 450, which included a third place in the first race at the fifth round. Savatgy then competed in the two-round 2022 FIM Supercross World Championship for the Rick Ware Racing team, winning the second round overall and finishing second in the WSX championship. As he committed to the second year of the FIM Supercross World Championship for the following season, Savatgy only competed in the first seven rounds of the 2023 AMA Supercross Championship, finishing in the top-ten in six of these. In the 2023 FIM Supercross World Championship, Savatgy finished second overall at the opening round before winning the second round in Abu Dhabi. This gave him the championship lead going into the final in Australia but with rival Ken Roczen winning the overall round and Savatgy being taken out in the first corner in one of the races, he had to settle for second in the final standings again.

With Triumph's return to off road racing in 2024, Savatgy was signed by the manufacturer as part of their factory team in America. As Triumph only had a 250 motorcycle ready to race, Savatgy was not allowed to compete in the AMA Supercross Championship due to AMA rules based on the results he previously achieved on a 250. In the 2024 AMA National Motocross Championship, he was able to record three top-ten overall finishes as his best results to finish twelfth in the final standings. At the end of the championship, Savatgy parted ways with Triumph and joined Fire Power Honda for the 2024 FIM Supercross World Championship and the Australian Supercross Championship. He was able to podium in each of the four rounds of the world championship and won a race at the third round to finish third in the final standings. In addition, Savatgy was able to become champion in the SX1 class of the Australian championship. Staying with the same Honda team, now named Quadlock Honda Racing, Savatgy returned to racing in the 450SX class in the 2025 AMA Supercross Championship. With nine top-ten finishes, which included two fifth places in Philadelphia and Salt Lake City, he finished the series in eleventh in the final standings. Savatgy had a consistent start to the 2025 AMA National Motocross Championship, finishing eighth overall at the opening round and sixth overall at the fourth round. A leg injury sustained at the sixth round saw him miss the rest of the season, coming back for the 2025 SuperMotocross World Championship playoff rounds. In SuperMotocross, Savatgy performed well, scoring two ninth places and an eighth in the final - resulting in ninth in the final standings. He ended the year competing in the 2025 FIM Supercross World Championship and after placing consistently over the first three rounds he found himself in the battle for the championship with two rounds to go. After picking up a race win at the penultimate round, Savatgy went into the final round tied on points with Jason Anderson but would ultimately end the championship as runner-up, after a hard fought final round battle with Anderson.

Savatgy secured some of his best 450SX results to date during the 2026 AMA Supercross Championship, securing six top-six main event finishes, with a high of fourth at the round in Philadelphia. Despite a foot injury ruling him out for the tenth round and missing the final round due to a wrist injury, Savatgy finished eighth in the final standings. He did not return until the season-ending 2026 SuperMotocross World Championship playoff rounds, where he finished a strong fifth in the mud at the opening event. At the remaining two rounds he was not able to finish the races due to lingering issues with his wrist from earlier in the year.

== Honours ==
FIM Supercross World Championship

- WSX: 2022, 2023 & 2025 (silver) , 2024 (bronze)

FIM Motocross Junior World Championship

- 125cc: 2011 (gold) , 2010 (silver)

AMA Supercross Championship

- 250SX West: 2016 (silver)
- 250SX East: 2017 (bronze)
- AMA Supercross Rookie of the Year: 2013 (gold) , 2019 (gold)

AMA Motocross Championship

- 250: 2015 & 2016 (bronze)

Australian Supercross Championship

- SX1: 2024 (gold)

Monster Energy Cup

- Monster Cup: 2018 (bronze)

AMA Amateur National Motocross Championship

- 450 A: 2012 (bronze)
- 250 A: 2012 (bronze)
- Schoolboy 2 (13–16) B/C: 2010 (gold)
- 85 (12–13) Modified: 2008 (gold)
- 85 (12–13) Stock: 2008 (gold)

== Career statistics ==
=== FIM Supercross World Championship ===
==== By season ====
Season	Class	Number	Motorcycle	Team	Overall Wins	Overall Podium	Pts	Plcd
2022	WSX	17	Kawasaki	Rick Ware Racing	1	1	112	2nd
2023	WSX	17	Kawasaki	Mobil 1 Rick Ware Racing	1	2	176	2nd
2024	WSX	17	Honda	Fire Power Honda Racing	0	4	328	3rd
2025	WSX	17	Honda	Quad Lock Honda Racing	0	2	166	2nd
Total					2	9	782	

=== AMA Supercross Championship ===
==== By season ====
Season	Class	Number	Motorcycle	Team	Overall Wins	Overall Podium	Pts	Plcd
2013	250SX West	176	KTM	JDR J-Star KTM	0	0	98	9th
2015	250SX East	37	Kawasaki	Monster Energy Pro Circuit Kawasaki	0	4	133	4th
2016	250SX West	37	Kawasaki	Monster Energy Pro Circuit Kawasaki	3	6	179	2nd
2017	250SX East	17	Kawasaki	Monster Energy Pro Circuit Kawasaki	1	5	166	3rd
2018	250SX West	17	Kawasaki	Monster Energy Pro Circuit Kawasaki	1	4	193	4th
2019	450SX	17	Kawasaki	Monster Energy Kawasaki	0	0	208	8th
2021	450SX	17	KTM	Rocky Mountain ATV/MC KTM WPS	0	0	207	10th
2022	450SX	17	KTM	Rocky Mountain ATV/MC KTM WPS	0	0	27	28th
2023	450SX	17	Kawasaki	Rick Ware Racing	0	0	85	20th
2025	450SX	17	Honda	Quadlock Honda Racing	0	0	153	11th
2026	450SX	17	Honda	Quadlock Honda Racing	0	0	194	8th
Total					5	19	1643	

=== AMA National Motocross Championship ===
==== By season ====
Season	Class	Number	Motorcycle	Team	Races	Race Wins	Overall Wins	Race Top-3	Overall Podium	Pts	Plcd
2013	250	176	KTM	FMF Orange Brigade KTM Lites Team	12	0	0	0	0	89	17th
2014	250	43	KTM	Rockstar Energy Racing	22	0	0	1	1	221	11th
2015	250	37	Kawasaki	Monster Energy Pro Circuit Kawasaki	24	0	1	7	4	348	3rd
2016	250	37	Kawasaki	Monster Energy Pro Circuit Kawasaki	24	5	3	11	4	383	3rd
2017	250	17	Kawasaki	Monster Energy Pro Circuit Kawasaki	20	4	3	6	4	324	5th
2018	250	17	Kawasaki	Monster Energy Pro Circuit Kawasaki	24	1	0	2	1	275	9th
2019	450	17	Kawasaki	Monster Energy Kawasaki	18	0	0	0	0	160	11th
2020	450	17	Suzuki	JGR Yoshimura Suzuki Factory Racing	15	0	0	0	0	147	11th
2021	450	17	KTM	Rocky Mountain ATV/MC KTM WPS	22	0	0	0	0	240	8th
2022	450	17	Kawasaki	Monster Energy Kawasaki	19	0	0	1	0	222	9th
2024	250	17	Triumph	Triumph Racing	21	0	0	0	0	192	12th
2025	450	17	Honda	Quadlock Honda Racing	12	0	0	0	0	124	17th
Total					233	10	7	28	14	2725	
