= Ryan Carlson =

American art director

Ryan L. Carlson (born 1974) is an American art director for animated films. He served as the production designer for the 2011 independent film Hoodwinked Too! Hood vs. Evil and for the 2026 DreamWorks film Forgotten Island.

== Education ==
Carlson studied at the San Jose State University, where he graduated in the late 1990s.

== Career ==
His first credited work on an animated film was as an effects inbetween artist for Brad Bird's 1999 animated film The Iron Giant.

In 2007, Carlson was recruited by Disney animator Mike Disa to serve as production designer for a sequel to the 2005 independent film Hoodwinked! funded by The Weinstein Company. Disa credited Carlson with expanding the environment of Hoodwinked! from a lone village to a "vast and intricate and unique world" for the sequel, and due to its limited budget compared to their other studio projects, Carlson worked with Disa and story writer Jeff Siergey in planning out "99.9 percent of all the designs and characters" before the film was storyboarded. Animation for the project was finished by 2009, and Hoodwinked Too! Hood vs. Evil was released in April 2011 to poor reviews.

After his work on Hoodwinked Too!, Carlson served as art director for the DisneyToon Studios film Planes. During pre-production, he followed executive producer John Lasseter's mandate to maintain accuracy in the design of each individual airplane while keeping them "pudgier" in design, stating that "We did multiple 'walk arounds' of each character to make sure we got all of their flaps, ailerons, trim tabs and actuators right." Carlson was also credited with designing the character of Rochelle. In the mid-2010s, Carlson began preparations for what was intended to be the third installment in the Planes film series, but the project was cancelled upon the studio's closure in 2018. At Sony Pictures Animation, he worked on the film The Emoji Movie (2017), for which he laid out a color script upon which the film's visuals can be based on for use in the storytelling.

Carlson served as the production designer for the 2026 DreamWorks Animation film Forgotten Island.

== Filmography ==
=== Film ===
Year	Title	Role	Notes
1999	The Iron Giant	Effects inbetween artist	
2000	The Emperors New Groove	Inbetween artist	Characters: Misty, Yzma Cat, Chicha
2001	Atlantis: The Lost Empire	Additional clean-up animator	
2004	Home on the Range	Inbetween artist	Characters: Sherriff, Jeb, Pearl, vultures
2004	One by One	Cleanup artist	Short film
2005	The Origin of Stitch		Short film
2006	The Little Matchgirl	Inbetween artist	Short film
2008	Tinker Bell	Art director	
2011	Hoodwinked Too! Hood vs. Evil	Production designer/art director	
2013	Planes	Art director	
2017	The Emoji Movie	Art director	
2018	Mary Poppins Returns	Environment designer	
2022	DC League of Super-Pets	Art director	
2024	The Wild Robot	Additional visual development artist	
2026	Forgotten Island	Production designer	

=== Television ===
Year	Title	Role	Notes
2004	Stripperella	Lead character designer	Episode: "The Curse of the WereBeaver"
2004	Cartoon Monsoon	Art director	Episode: "Creepwood" (Part 1 and 2)
