= Cole Seely =

American motorcycle racer

- Nationality: American
- Born: March 10, 1990 (age 36) Newbury Park, California

Motocross career
- Years active: 2005 - 8/1/2019
- Teams: Honda

Cole Seely (born March 10, 1990) is an American professional motocross racer. Racing for Honda in 2023, he began riding professionally in 2009. Seely began his 450cc rookie season in 2015 riding for the factory Honda team. He was named Monster Energy Supercross Rookie of the Year in 2015.

In 2017, Seely finished seventh in Supercross and fifth in Motocross, earning him a position on the Motocross des Nations US team. After retiring in 2019 due to injuries, he returned to racing in 2022, competing in the 2022 FIM Supercross World Championship on the Honda team.

== Early life ==
Cole Seely was born on March 10, 1990 and is from Newbury Park, California. He used to go to the motocross track with his father and grandfather, and began racing for fun with Trey Canard starting at age 12. He competed in a few BMX nationals, but preferred motorcycles and soon focused on motocross.

== Career ==
=== Troy Lee Designs (2009-2014) ===
Seely began riding professionally in 2009, signing with the Honda-backed Troy Lee Designs team in 2010. With this team, he raced a CRF250R motorcycle. Also on the Troy Lee Designs Honda satellite squad, he had three appearances as a substitute rider on Team Muscle Milk in the premier class. Early in his career, Seely finished fourth overall in the 250cc Western Region Supercross and 14th in the 250cc AMA Motocross Championship in 2011 riding for HRC Honda.

In a 2012 crash, Seely lacerated his liver and damaged an artery leading to a kidney, missing the majority of the 2012 Supercross and Motocross seasons. He was off his bike for half a year, before returning in 2013. In March 2014, he filled in as injury replacement on the Honda team for Trey Canard, earning a career-best eighth place. He was the 2014 250SX Class Western Regional championship runner-up. He ultimately spent five years with Troy Lee Designs, with five 250SX wins.

=== Honda factory team and retirement (2014-2019) ===
Seely was signed to the Honda factory team on August 25, 2014, to ride a Honda CRF450R in both AMA Supercross championships and AMA Pro Motocross championships. Seely began his 450cc rookie season in 2015 riding for the factory Honda team.

In 2015, Seely became the first premier-class rookie to win a race in the 450SX series. It was his first 450SX win. He was named 450SX Rookie of the Year in the 2015 Monster Energy AMA Supercross Series. It was his first full-time campaign in the premier division, where he earned 10 top-five finishes, along with his main event win, and had third place in the final points standings. He was the 2015 Monster Energy Cup Champion.

In the 2017 Monster Energy AMA Supercross season, by March, Seely had finished no worse than sixth across 11 rounds, and he had placed second in Arlington, Texas, and placed third in Anaheim, California. He continued to ride the factory Honda CRF450R. Racing for Team Honda HRC, he finished sixth overall at Thunder Valley National in the third round of the 2017 AMA Pro Motocross Championship. At the time, he was dealing with two injuries, one from a crash in the first round, and the other a leg injury in supercross. After the event, he moved from his home in Costa Mesa, California to Claremont, Florida for the season. In 2017, Seely finished seventh in Supercross and fifth in Motocross, earning him a position on the Motocross des Nations US team. He represented Team USA at the 2017 Motocross des Nations event.

On February 24, 2018, Seely ejected over his handlebar in a race, with his rear wheel landing on him. He was taken off the tracks at Tampa supercross after breaking his pelvis, which required surgery. On April 6, 2019, he raced in the Nashville Supercross event at the Nissan Stadium. He raced with the Honda factory team until 2019, when he announced his retirement from the team and the sport. Aged 29 at the time, Seely cited injuries, particularly a shoulder injury in 2018, as the reason.

In 2019, Seely joined his relative Jeannie Seely performing at the Grand Ole Opry. According to Motocross Action Magazine, Seely is a car enthusiast and built his own drift car.

=== Return to racing (2023-) ===
In 2022, Seely competed in the 2022 FIM Supercross World Championship in Melbourne, Australia.

In 2023, Seely returned to World Supercross racing with the MotoConcepts Racing team, then racing WSX 450cc class. He competed in the 2023 Supercross races in Seattle, racing for Honda and ultimately ranking 21 out of 22 in the 450 main event. He was one of 24 riders from the United States competing in the 2023 FIM Supercross World Championship, racing in the premier WSX division for MotoConcepts.
