= 2024 AMA National Motocross Championship =

2024 AMA motocross championship season

The 2024 AMA Motocross Championship season was the 53rd AMA Motocross National Championship season, the premier motocross series in USA. Jett Lawrence was the defending champion in the 450 class, after winning every race on the way to title in 2023.

In the 250 class, due to moving up to the 450 class for 2024, Hunter Lawrence did not defend the title he won for the first time in the previous season.

The championship formed the second part of the 2024 SuperMotocross World Championship season.

== Calendar and Results ==
=== 450cc ===
| Round | Date | Location | Race 1 Winner | Race 2 Winner | Round Winner |
|---|---|---|---|---|---|
| 1 | May 25 | (California) Fox Raceway National | (Australia) Jett Lawrence | (Australia) Jett Lawrence | (Australia) Jett Lawrence |
| 2 | June 1 | (California) Hangtown Motocross Classic | (United States) Chase Sexton | (United States) Chase Sexton | (United States) Chase Sexton |
| 3 | June 8 | (Colorado) Thunder Valley National | (Australia) Hunter Lawrence | (Australia) Jett Lawrence | (Australia) Jett Lawrence |
| 4 | June 15 | (Pennsylvania) High Point National | (Australia) Jett Lawrence | (Australia) Jett Lawrence | (Australia) Jett Lawrence |
| 5 | June 29 | (Massachusetts) Southwick National | (Australia) Jett Lawrence | (United States) Chase Sexton | (Australia) Jett Lawrence |
| 6 | July 6 | (Michigan) Red Bud National | (United States) Chase Sexton | (United States) Chase Sexton | (United States) Chase Sexton |
| 7 | July 13 | (Minnesota) Spring Creek National | (United States) Chase Sexton | (United States) Chase Sexton | (United States) Chase Sexton |
| 8 | July 20 | (Washington (state)) Washougal National | (United States) Chase Sexton | (United States) Chase Sexton | (United States) Chase Sexton |
| 9 | August 10 | (New York (state)) Unadilla National | (Australia) Hunter Lawrence | (United States) Chase Sexton | (United States) Chase Sexton |
| 10 | August 17 | (Maryland) Budds Creek National | (Australia) Hunter Lawrence | (United States) Chase Sexton | (United States) Chase Sexton |
| 11 | August 24 | (Indiana) Ironman National | (United States) Chase Sexton | (United States) Chase Sexton | (United States) Chase Sexton |

=== 250cc ===
| Round | Date | Location | Race 1 Winner | Race 2 Winner | Round Winner |
|---|---|---|---|---|---|
| 1 | May 25 | (California) Fox Raceway National | (United States) Haiden Deegan | (United States) Haiden Deegan | (United States) Haiden Deegan |
| 2 | June 1 | (California) Hangtown Motocross Classic | (United States) Haiden Deegan | (France) Tom Vialle | (United States) Haiden Deegan |
| 3 | June 8 | (Colorado) Thunder Valley National | (United States) Haiden Deegan | (United States) Chance Hymas | (United States) Haiden Deegan |
| 4 | June 15 | (Pennsylvania) High Point National | (United States) Haiden Deegan | (United States) Ty Masterpool | (United States) Ty Masterpool |
| 5 | June 29 | (Massachusetts) Southwick National | (United States) Haiden Deegan | (Japan) Jo Shimoda | (United States) Haiden Deegan |
| 6 | July 6 | (Michigan) Red Bud National | (United States) Ty Masterpool | (United States) Chance Hymas | (United States) Chance Hymas |
| 7 | July 13 | (Minnesota) Spring Creek National | (United States) Levi Kitchen | (United States) Levi Kitchen | (United States) Levi Kitchen |
| 8 | July 20 | (Washington (state)) Washougal National | (France) Tom Vialle | (United States) Haiden Deegan | (United States) Haiden Deegan |
| 9 | August 10 | (New York (state)) Unadilla National | (United States) Haiden Deegan | (United States) Levi Kitchen | (United States) Levi Kitchen |
| 10 | August 17 | (Maryland) Budds Creek National | (United States) Haiden Deegan | (United States) Levi Kitchen | (United States) Levi Kitchen |
| 11 | August 24 | (Indiana) Ironman National | (France) Tom Vialle | (United States) Haiden Deegan | (France) Tom Vialle |

=== Track locations ===
2024 AMA Motocross Championship locations

== 450cc ==
=== Entry list ===
| Team | Constructor | No | Rider | Rounds |
|---|---|---|---|---|
| Team Honda HRC | Honda | 1 | (Australia) Jett Lawrence | 1–5 |
| Team Honda HRC | Honda | 96 | (Australia) Hunter Lawrence | All |
| Monster Energy Yamaha Star Racing | Yamaha | 2 | (United States) Cooper Webb | 9 |
| Monster Energy Yamaha Star Racing | Yamaha | 3 | (United States) Eli Tomac | 10–11 |
| Monster Energy Yamaha Star Racing | Yamaha | 32 | (United States) Justin Cooper | All |
| Red Bull KTM Factory Racing USA | KTM | 4 | (United States) Chase Sexton | All |
| Red Bull KTM Factory Racing USA | KTM | 7 | (United States) Aaron Plessinger | All |
| Twisted Tea Suzuki Presented by Progressive Insurance | Suzuki | 11 | (United States) Kyle Chisholm | All |
| Twisted Tea Suzuki Presented by Progressive Insurance | Suzuki | 12 | (United States) Shane McElrath | 1–8 |
| Twisted Tea Suzuki Presented by Progressive Insurance | Suzuki | 45 | (United States) Colt Nichols | 9–11 |
| Progressive Insurance ECSTAR Suzuki | Suzuki | 94 | (Germany) Ken Roczen | 9 |
| MaddParts.com Kawasaki Race Team | Kawasaki | 12 | (United States) Shane McElrath | 9–11 |
| MaddParts.com Kawasaki Race Team | Kawasaki | 22 | (Sweden) Fredrik Noren | All |
| MaddParts.com Kawasaki Race Team | Kawasaki | 199 | (United States) John Short | 1–5, 7–8 |
| Phoenix Racing Honda | Honda | 14 | (France) Dylan Ferrandis | All |
| Phoenix Racing Honda | Honda | 58 | (United States) Cullin Park | All |
| Phoenix Racing Honda | Honda | 184 | (United States) Mike Witkowski | 5–6 |
| FirePower Honda Racing | Honda | 15 | (United Kingdom) Dean Wilson | 1, 6, 8, 10–11 |
| Monster Energy Kawasaki | Kawasaki | 21 | (United States) Jason Anderson | All |
| Monster Energy Kawasaki | Kawasaki | 938 | (United States) Broc Tickle | 6, 10 |
| Gizmo Mods Rock River Yamaha Racing | Yamaha | 23 | (United States) Grant Harlan | All |
| Gizmo Mods Rock River Yamaha Racing | Yamaha | 75 | (United States) Marshal Weltin | All |
| Gizmo Mods Rock River Yamaha Racing | Yamaha | 93 | (United States) Bryce Shelly | All |
| Gizmo Mods Rock River Yamaha Racing | Yamaha | 332 | (United States) Colton Eigenmann | 1–9 |
| Muc-Off FXR ClubMX Yamaha Racing | Yamaha | 26 | (United States) Garrett Marchbanks | 5–7 |
| Muc-Off FXR ClubMX Yamaha Racing | Yamaha | 36 | (United States) Phil Nicoletti | 1–2, 4–11 |
| Muc-Off FXR ClubMX Yamaha Racing | Yamaha | 91 | (United States) Devin Simonson | 10–11 |
| Rockstar Energy Husqvarna Factory Racing USA | Husqvarna | 27 | (United States) Malcolm Stewart | All |
| Rockstar Energy Husqvarna Factory Racing USA | Husqvarna | 28 | (United States) Christian Craig | All |
| Team Tedder Monster Energy KTM | KTM | 46 | (United States) Justin Hill | 1–3 |
| Troy Lee Designs Red Bull GASGAS Factory Racing | GASGAS | 51 | (United States) Justin Barcia | 1–5 |
| AEO Powersports KTM Racing | KTM | 53 | (United States) Derek Kelley | All |
| Valley Automotive Group | Honda | 56 | (United States) Jeremy Hand | 3–6, 9–11 |
| Wildcat Race Team | Gas Gas | 60 | (Venezuela) Lorenzo Locurcio | All |
| Kevin Moranz Racing Champion KTM | KTM | 62 | (United States) Kevin Moranz | 6–7, 11 |
| Tech Service Racing/Storm Lake Honda | Honda | 65 | (United States) Henry Miller | 1, 3–7, 10–11 |
| TPJ Fly Racing Team | Gas Gas | 68 | (France) Romain Pape | All |
| TPJ Fly Racing Team | Kawasaki | 119 | (United States) Logan Boye | 1–4, 9–11 |
| TPJ Fly Racing Team | KTM | 746 | (United States) Trevor Schmidt | 4 |
| Estenson Racing/TruLine Corp | Yamaha | 70 | (United States) Jerry Robin | 1–6, 9–11 |
| Team Solitaire Heartbeat Hot Sauce Yamaha | Yamaha | 73 | (United States) Robbie Wageman | 1–2 |
| MX101 FXR Yamaha | Yamaha | 77 | (United States) Preston Kilroy | 10–11 |
| JT Construction/Ilves Transport | KTM | 79 | (Estonia) Harri Kullas | 2, 4–11 |
| Partzilla PRMX Kawasaki | Kawasaki | 81 | (United States) Cade Clason | 4, 6, 11 |
| Rides Unlimited Rocky Mountain ATV MC Racing | KTM | 84 | (Venezuela) Anthony Rodríguez | All |
| Horse Power Solutions | Honda | 86 | (United States) Luca Marsalisi | 1–4 |
| Toyota Redlands BARX Suzuki | Suzuki | 87 | (United States) Max Miller | All |
| Kessler Concrete ATeam RevX Yamaha | Yamaha | 92 | (United States) Jace Kessler | 3–7, 9–11 |
| Tristan Lane Racing/Silverback Racing | KTM | 97 | (United States) Tristan Lane | 5–6 |
| Team VHR/MXECOACHING | Gas Gas | 103 | (France) Scotty Verhaeghe | 1–8 |
| Muc-Off FXR ClubMX Yamaha Racing | Yamaha | 112 | (United States) Trevin Nelson | 4, 6–7 |
| Dylan Kappeler Racing | Yamaha | 124 | (United States) Dylan Kappeler | 1–2 |
| HBI Racing Kawasaki | Kawasaki | 137 | (United States) Ayden Shive | 1–7, 9 |
| Ellicott City Motorsports | KTM | 148 | (United States) Justin Rodbell | 4–5 |
| Bowlin Racing | Yamaha | 148 | (United States) Justin Rodbell | 7, 9–11 |
| Shralp Nation/Bell Motosports | Yamaha | 153 | (United States) C.J. Tucker | 2, 8 |
| Wraptor Custom Designs/Schmidtys/Coldwell Banker | Yamaha | 165 | (United States) Jack Winland | 4, 6, 10–11 |
| Connecticut Land Design | KTM | 170 | (United States) Adam Dobrovich | 9–10 |
| Motocross Action | KTM | 171 | (United States) Josh Mosiman | 1–2 |
| | Yamaha | 176 | (United States) Brandon Green | 7 |
| Tomahawk MX | Honda | 177 | (United States) Tyler Stepek | 2–6, 9–10 |
| Stanley's Mobile Service | Kawasaki | 178 | (United States) Justin Kurtz | 7, 9–11 |
| Morgantown Powersports/Bonzi Suspension/DH1Mods | Yamaha | 183 | (United States) Mitchell Zaremba | 3–4, 6–7 |
| We1racing | Honda | 190 | (United States) Dominic Desimone | 1 |
| Beaver Creek Cycle | KTM | 193 | (United States) Ryan Diezic | 4, 6–7, 9–11 |
| Motosport Hillsboro/Core Powersports | Kawasaki | 207 | (United States) Rider Fisher | 8 |
| | Husqvarna | 217 | (United States) Cory Gilliam | 4, 10 |
| Deep End Designs | Kawasaki | 218 | (United States) Mason Haberek | 9 |
| Triple Deuce MX | Husqvarna | 222 | (United States) Brandon Hugney | 4, 9–10 |
| Dawson Kaub Racing | Kawasaki | 223 | (United States) Dawson Kaub | 7–8 |
| Tech OneDesigns/GNG Logistics | Yamaha | 224 | (United States) Casey Carmichael | 1–3, 6, 8 |
| Lets Ride | Honda | 226 | (United States) Cameron Horner | 1–8 |
| FXR/Racetech/Black Diamond MX | KTM | 229 | (United States) Cameron Skaalerud | 7, 11 |
| Meadow Valley Motocross | KTM | 233 | (United States) Josh Boaz | 1–5, 7 |
| Grassroots MX/Fasst Company | Honda | 234 | (United States) McCoy Brough | 3 |
| Kyle Bushee Racing | Yamaha | 236 | (United States) Kyle Bushee | 5, 9 |
| Tohoku TRAS/NANPO Corporation | Honda | 240 | (Japan) Takumu Yokosawa | 5–8 |
| Devol/Fusion Graphix/PDR | Yamaha | 246 | (United States) Chance Blackburn | 8 |
| Lahman Racing | Yamaha | 252 | (United States) Zachary Lahman | 10 |
| Cook Construction | KTM | 254 | (United States) Cole Cook | 1 |
| | Husqvarna | 257 | (United States) Joey DeNeen | 4 |
| Fredericktown Yamaha | Yamaha | 268 | (United States) Gage Stine | 3–5 |
| FXR/RM Army Suzuki | Suzuki | 281 | (United States) Cory Carsten | 1–3, 5–6, 11 |
| JWR Honda | Honda | 290 | (Sweden) Alvin Östlund | 5–6 |
| Fusion Graphix/Omni Interiors | Honda | 291 | (United States) Corey Kirkland | 8 |
| 296 | Honda | 296 | (United States) Ryder Floyd | 1–5, 7–8 |
| Rosemary's Thyme Mexican Restaurant | Yamaha | 297 | (United States) Vincent Harrison | 4–5 |
| Arma Sport | Yamaha | 305 | (United States) Jack Saggau | 1–2 |
| Kennedys Cycle | Yamaha | 308 | (United States) Jacob Beverage | 4, 6, 9–11 |
| Roth Racing | Honda | 309 | (United States) Jeremy Smith | 3 |
| 3Bros Hatch Racing | Husqvarna | 310 | (United States) Kai Aiello | 2 |
| FDR Motorsports/Dirtab Concepts | Suzuki | 312 | (United States) Trevor Dunn | 6–7, 10–11 |
| Th Shop | Kawasaki | 315 | (United States) Cody Groves | 4–6, 9–11 |
| Westfield Powersports | Yamaha | 324 | (United States) Bo Cooper | 6–7, 11 |
| Gadola's | Kawasaki | 327 | (United States) Alex Panzarella | 9 |
| Cycle Sport Yamaha KTM | KTM | 333 | (United States) Zane Klemz | 6, 11 |
| Monster Energy Twisted Development Yamaha | Yamaha | 334 | (Australia) Brad West | 1–2, 8 |
| 338 | Husqvarna | 338 | (United States) Will Stockland | 3, 7–8 |
| ATV and more/JH2 Suspension | KTM | 340 | (United States) Skyler Leaf | 4, 6 |
| TagMX | Kawasaki | 342 | (United States) Cory Broyles | 4 |
| Galaxy Cloaking | Gas Gas | 346 | (United States) Charles Tolleson | 3 |
| Ferrellcat Racing | Yamaha | 348 | (United States) Jack Ferrell | 2, 8 |
| K&M Rebar Fusion | Honda | 349 | (United States) Kile Epperson | All |
| | Husqvarna | 350 | (United States) Chandler Baker | 3, 7 |
| Heyser Cycle | Kawasaki | 351 | (United States) Jack Rogers | 4–5, 9–10 |
| LC Lawn/Schoolboy Designs | Yamaha | 356 | (United States) Chris Cornish | 2, 8 |
| Hays MX | Gas Gas | 358 | (United States) Ivon Hays | 6, 11 |
| IDD | KTM | 363 | (United States) Taylor Beckwith | 4 |
| 110 Racing/AP Contracting | Yamaha | 366 | (United States) Blaze Cremaldi | 1–5 |
| ORR Motorsports | Honda | 369 | (United States) Nicholas Hunt | 6–7 |
| | Yamaha | 370 | (United States) Patrick Anderson | 4, 10 |
| 374 | Kawasaki | 374 | (United States) Jared Gumeson | 1–2, 8 |
| BDMX/FXR/CFR/Larsons Cycle | Yamaha | 380 | (United States) Nick Jackson | 7 |
| Churn Racing | Gas Gas | 383 | (United States) James Churn | 10 |
| JT Construction Honda | Honda | 387 | (Estonia) Gert Krestinov | 5–7 |
| Monty's Motorsports | Gas Gas | 390 | (United States) Trevor Brown | 5, 9 |
| Lennon Racing | KTM | 394 | (United States) Michael Lennon | 4, 10 |
| Watkins Lighting & Sign | KTM | 411 | (United States) Scott Meshey | 5, 7, 9 |
| Grgurich Racing | Yamaha | 415 | (United States) Brendan Grgurich | 7, 11 |
| HBI Racing | Gas Gas | 416 | (United States) Jake Masterpool | 1–2, 5–6, 8–9 |
| Shred MX | Honda | 418 | (United States) Zach Peters | 4, 6, 9, 11 |
| | Gas Gas | 419 | (United States) Kiliaen Van Rensselaer | 10 |
| SC Sporthomes Husqvarna | Husqvarna | 421 | (South Africa) Tristan Purdon | 2–4, 9–11 |
| SC Sporthomes Husqvarna | Husqvarna | 591 | (United Kingdom) Charlie Putnam | 2–4, 9–11 |
| 433 | Kawasaki | 433 | (United States) Anthony Gonsalves | 2 |
| Mosites Powersports/Fast Track Moto/TrueMX | Honda | 437 | (United States) Vinny Luhovey | 4–6, 9–11 |
| Johnson Racing | KTM | 442 | (United States) Zach Johnson | 5 |
| Basco Racing | Gas Gas | 444 | (United States) Justin Cokinos | 4–6, 9 |
| GDOGG Racing Yamaha | Yamaha | 445 | (United States) Noah Miesen | 1–3, 7, 10 |
| Team Jit Loader | Kawasaki | 450 | (United States) Brad Burkhart | 2, 8 |
| FXR | KTM | 455 | (United States) Kollin Lund | 7, 11 |
| Empire Construction/Big D Homes | KTM | 466 | (United States) Mike Kruger | 3, 6–7 |
| | Yamaha | 471 | (United States) Daniel Netti | 9 |
| Rising Motorsports Racing Team | KTM | 475 | (Australia) Zachary Watson | 2 |
| FXR/Ogio/Black Diamond MX | Honda | 477 | (United States) Mitchell Prescott | 7 |
| Grindstone Compound | Yamaha | 481 | (United States) Jonah Schmidt | 1, 8 |
| Muc-Off FXR ClubMX Yamaha Racing | Yamaha | 482 | (United States) Hayden Justice | 6, 10 |
| YT - Life of a Privateer | Yamaha | 483 | (United States) Bryton Carroll | 1–7, 9 |
| Randanella Septic Inc | Kawasaki | 489 | (United States) Ricci Randanella | 5 |
| KDR | Yamaha | 495 | (United States) Jud Wisdom | 11 |
| Lets Ride Powersports | Yamaha | 496 | (United States) Kevin Clinton | 1–3, 8 |
| Masters Motoplex/PTD/Phase Moto | Yamaha | 498 | (United States) Jason Dragonetti | 10 |
| Precision Dairy Equipment | Honda | 510 | (United States) Travis Prier | 7 |
| Hames Trucking | Yamaha | 512 | (United States) Austin Cozadd | 10 |
| Roth Racing | Yamaha | 514 | (United States) Anthony Roth | 10 |
| Team Blue Groove Graphix | Husqvarna | 516 | (Mexico) Jorge Rubalcava | 3 |
| Clastic Designs/FLY Racing/Dunlop | Kawasaki | 517 | (United States) Jimmy Hazel | 2, 8 |
| Graham KTM/TCD/Slipshot | KTM | 525 | (United States) Spencer Winter | 11 |
| Full Throttle Motorsports | Kawasaki | 528 | (United States) Ryan Peters | 6–8 |
| Bonzi Suspension/Moto Marks/Axcel Energy | Kawasaki | 529 | (United States) Brett Heidorn | 10–11 |
| STC Motorsports/Kean Construction | KTM | 530 | (United States) Dawson Draycott | 3 |
| MGR | Honda | 531 | (United States) Tayler Grall | 7 |
| MX23 | Yamaha | 534 | (United States) Jason Brooks | 5 |
| Full Throttle Motorsports | Husqvarna | 546 | (United States) Harris Huizenga | 7 |
| NCAuto All Terrain Motorsports | Yamaha | 550 | (United States) John Citrola | 3 |
| Heberton Lima Racing | Kawasaki | 555 | (Brazil) Heberton Lima | 5, 9–10 |
| Nasdaq | KTM | 558 | (United States) Matt Barber | 2 |
| Underground RC | KTM | 561 | (United States) Caleb Hall | 4, 9 |
| | KTM | 563 | (United States) Dante Oliveira | 8 |
| Rose Racing | KTM | 566 | (United States) Jacob Rose | 4, 10 |
| Lead by Faith Construction | Honda | 571 | (United States) Jordan Isola | 1–2 |
| Lechien Racing | Yamaha | 574 | (United States) Ryan Lechien | 4, 6, 9 |
| DC3 | KTM | 578 | (United States) Steve Avery | 5 |
| Motobros | KTM | 580 | (United States) Dustin Jensen | 4 |
| Miserable Clothing Co | KTM | 586 | (United States) Nick Reekers | 7 |
| Race Tech | Kawasaki | 588 | (United States) Eddie Norred | 1–4, 6–11 |
| | Yamaha | 595 | (United States) Michael Kitzmiller | 6 |
| Fox Racing | Gas Gas | 600 | (United States) Connor Olson | 8 |
| Mountain Motorsports | Yamaha | 603 | (United States) Matty Silva | 5 |
| Baxter Built/Clover Hill | KTM | 610 | (United States) Nick Gonzales | 8, 11 |
| BFM Motorsports | Honda | 615 | (United States) Kyle Vidovich | 6 |
| EVO BillDog Racing | Honda | 617 | (United States) Hayden Cordell | 8 |
| FMK | Honda | 618 | (United States) Talon Gorman | 8 |
| MXTire/110 Racing/DirtLab Concepts | Husqvarna | 620 | (United States) Peyton Jackson | 5 |
| Triangle Cycles | Yamaha | 621 | (United States) Bennett Mantooth | 4, 9–11 |
| Chilsons Logistics/Mt Glen Farm | Honda | 630 | (United States) Matthew Jackson | 4–6, 9–11 |
| @Motorsportscafe/KBR | Honda | 636 | (United States) Luke Kalaitzian | 1–2 |
| BPMX | Yamaha | 637 | (United States) Bobby Piazza | 3–4, 9–10 |
| Genshore Mechanical/Syncor Contracting | Honda | 638 | (Canada) Lucas Giardino | 7 |
| | Honda | 641 | (United States) Tommy Flora | 8 |
| Hubert Racing | Yamaha | 647 | (United States) Matt Hubert | 8 |
| Kris Kowalsky Racing | Honda | 651 | (United States) Jeremy Kowalsky | 3 |
| NiftyFive | Husqvarna | 654 | (Canada) Vincent Lauzon | 5–6, 9 |
| GFR | Honda | 662 | (United States) Dean Gall | 11 |
| Allen Racing | KTM | 666 | (United States) Collin Hinrichs | 6–7 |
| NorCal Suspension and Services | KTM | 671 | (United States) Tyler DuCray | 2 |
| GPS Racing | Yamaha | 672 | (United States) Brandon Pederson | 1–8, 10 |
| Central Collision Repair | Honda | 673 | (United States) Landon Armbruster | 6, 11 |
| Podium Works/First Bike Motorsports | Yamaha | 680 | (United States) TJ Squib | 4, 6, 9–11 |
| Storm Lake Honda | Honda | 682 | (United States) Izaih Clark | 6–7, 9–11 |
| McLam Racing | Yamaha | 685 | (United States) Pat McLam | 3, 8 |
| Stew Heating Racing | Kawasaki | 688 | (United States) Brandan Leith | 3, 8 |
| Black Diamond MX/Krystal Klean Detailing | Honda | 692 | (United States) Brett McLaud | 7 |
| Race Tech Titanium/Twisted Team | Honda | 693 | (United States) Bryce McLaud | 7 |
| 4PR Performance | KTM | 694 | (United States) Nick Inman | 1–6, 11 |
| Kaptain Kunzee MX | Honda | 696 | (United States) Nick Kraeger | 5, 9 |
| DK Off-Road powered by Aces Motorcycles | Honda | 700 | (United Kingdom) Brad Todd | 3 |
| Eglentowicz Motosports | Yamaha | 715 | (United States) Ian Kearon | 9–10 |
| Unleashed Tech Service Racing | Gas Gas | 717 | (United States) Billy Clark | 5, 11 |
| FDR Motorsports | Honda | 720 | (United States) Jordon Fancher | 7, 10–11 |
| AWOL Racing | Yamaha | 721 | (United States) Nathan Murphy | 4–5, 9–10 |
| Motosport Hillsboro/Heatwave Vault | Husqvarna | 726 | (United States) Gared Steinke | 2, 8 |
| Shawn MacDonald Racing | Yamaha | 728 | (United States) Shawn MacDonald | 5 |
| MX Locker/Steelkorr | Husqvarna | 734 | (United States) Dayton Briggs | 1–3 |
| EMX 13 INC 631MX | Yamaha | 740 | (United States) Sebastian Balbuena | 4–5, 9–10 |
| MXU/Precision Auto Rebuilders | Yamaha | 749 | (United States) James Manni | 5 |
| Resilience | Kawasaki | 755 | (United States) Eric Rivera | 1–2 |
| Matt Tovani Racing | Yamaha | 761 | (United States) Matt Tovani | 5 |
| Mobile X FirePower Honda | Honda | 762 | (Australia) Kyle Webster | 5–6 |
| Kessler Racing | Honda | 776 | (United States) Seamus Sullivan | 5 |
| Tech Service Racing | Yamaha | 777 | (United States) James Harrington | 2–7, 9 |
| SLR Honda | Honda | 790 | (United States) Jaxon Pascal | 9–11 |
| Young Powersports | Kawasaki | 791 | (United States) Matt Thomas | 8 |
| Platinum Powersports | Yamaha | 797 | (United States) Karter DeLong | 4–7, 11 |
| TroyLee Design/Hoosier Tires/Pro Circuit | Husqvarna | 801 | (United States) Brian DeRuyter | 2 |
| Mason Agency/DeGrange Electric | Kawasaki | 802 | (United States) Marshall MacIntyre | 5 |
| Lojaks Cycles | Yamaha | 808 | (United States) Zach Gareis | 4, 6, 11 |
| Sorensen Racing | Honda | 814 | (United States) Deven Sorensen | 5 |
| HBI Auto | Yamaha | 820 | (United States) Matthew Burkeen | 3, 9–10 |
| FMK (FACTORYMOTOKIDS) | Honda | 821 | (United States) Jeffrey Gorman | 2 |
| Duke Cycles/TR Inscore LLC | Husqvarna | 822 | (United States) Riley Ripper | 1–3, 7 |
| Daystar Builders | Honda | 826 | (United States) Trent Yoder | 4 |
| KTM Sarholz Racing Team | KTM | 829 | (Germany) Henry Jacobi | 9–10 |
| Motocross Action/Thor/AEO | Yamaha | 830 | (United States) Ezra Lewis | 1 |
| FXR/#1 Gripper/Limited Decal/ODI | KTM | 831 | (United States) Jacob Glenn | 1–3 |
| TPR Klim Edemanns Racing | KTM | 834 | (United States) Kris Corey | 5, 9 |
| Pure Adrenaline/Let's Ride/Pocatello TMX | Yamaha | 835 | (United States) Conner Lords | 1, 3 |
| Walker Motorsports | Gas Gas | 841 | (United States) Jeff Walker | 1–7, 11 |
| Laurense Motors Kawasaki Racing | Kawasaki | 844 | (Netherlands) Robert Fobbe | 1–2 |
| | Yamaha | 851 | (United States) Neal Allen | 8 |
| Carol Stream Powersports | Kawasaki | 855 | (United States) Jeff Shuck | 7 |
| Iverson Racing | KTM | 856 | (United States) Scott Iverson | 5, 9 |
| FXR Moto/X Brand Goggles | KTM | 859 | (United States) Ethan Eslinger | 6–7, 11 |
| Weiler Excavating/Jonny Weis | Kawasaki | 860 | (United States) Kyle Petrie | 5–7 |
| Ben Riddle/Pro Action FL | Kawasaki | 871 | (United States) Griffin Maxwell | 6 |
| Rocket MX | Husqvarna | 872 | (United States) Josh Hoover | 9–10 |
| Jeff Orres | Honda | 873 | (United States) Ronnie Orres | 7, 11 |
| Fusion/RSR/Stussy | Honda | 874 | (United States) Zack Williams | 1–4, 6–10 |
| Kelleher Ceilings/FXR/Razee | Honda | 887 | (United States) Shane Kelleher | 5 |
| PCP Motorsports | Yamaha | 888 | (United States) Blake Ballard | 2, 8 |
| FXR | Yamaha | 891 | (United States) Kyle Koosmann | 3, 6 |
| Forge MX Training/Lokey Powersports | KTM | 901 | (United States) Brayden Lessler | 1–4, 8 |
| Jena Miller Racing | Yamaha | 907 | (United States) Dustin Miller | 10 |
| 909 Motors/Tony Stack Suspension | Yamaha | 909 | (United States) Ryan Wadsworth | 5 |
| Red Bull/BBR Motorsports/MotoSport.com | Yamaha | 910 | (United States) Carson Brown | 8 |
| Rocky Mountain ATV/MC | Gas Gas | 919 | (United States) Jayce Cannon | 3, 8 |
| The Farm MX/Fingerlakes Towing | KTM | 920 | (United States) Nick Smith | 4, 9–10 |
| Moto United/H&H Racing | Kawasaki | 922 | (United States) Hunter Carmody | 3, 8 |
| Dewitt Custom Concrete | Yamaha | 927 | (United States) Shane Kehoe | 11 |
| Roseville Moto/Eastbay | Yamaha | 928 | (United States) Bryce Hammond | 1–5, 8–9 |
| Pro-Moto Suspension | Yamaha | 930 | (Australia) Joel Wightman | 1 |
| Pro-Moto Suspension | KTM | 936 | (Australia) Travis Silk | 1 |
| Talbott Racing | Yamaha | 940 | (United States) Evan Talbott | 4–11 |
| Interlakes Sports Center | Yamaha | 947 | (United States) Cody Hutchison | 11 |
| | KTM | 955 | (United States) Jayden Shindel | 4, 10 |
| Smith Pro Rodeos | KTM | 958 | (United States) Matthew Curler | 3 |
| Georgetown Heating and Cooling | Yamaha | 962 | (United States) Joe Tait | 4–5 |
| Batchlor Racing | Gas Gas | 963 | (United States) Isaac Langston | 6, 11 |
| Quality Auto Sales | Yamaha | 966 | (United States) Koltyn Thompson | 3 |
| Melo Design Co./Outdoor Motorsports | Yamaha | 972 | (United States) Nick Niles | 9 |
| Olson Racing | Yamaha | 982 | (United States) Skylar Olson | 3, 7 |
| Whitcraft Rider Development/Bonzi Suspension | KTM | 988 | (United States) Gavin Mays | 3–4, 6, 10–11 |
| Dulcella/Lustrada/Regart Design | KTM | 994 | (United States) Juan Paul Sanchez | 5 |
| Kaplan Cycles/Factory Connection | Gas Gas | 997 | (United States) Jimmy Hebert | 5, 9 |

=== Riders Championship ===
| Pos | Rider | Bike | FOX (California) | | HAN (California) | | THU (Colorado) | | HIG (Pennsylvania) | | SOU (Massachusetts) | | RED (Michigan) | | SPR (Minnesota) | | WAS (Washington (state)) | | UNA (New York (state)) | | BUD (Maryland) | | IRN (Indiana) | | Points |
|---|---|---|---|---|---|---|---|---|---|---|---|---|---|---|---|---|---|---|---|---|---|---|---|---|---|
| 1 | (United States) Chase Sexton | KTM | 4 | 2 | 1 | 1 | 6 | 5 | 3 | 2 | 3 | 1 | 1 | 1 | 1 | 1 | 1 | 1 | 2 | 1 | 2 | 1 | 1 | 1 | 504 |
| 2 | (Australia) Hunter Lawrence | Honda | 2 | 3 | 2 | 4 | 1 | 2 | 2 | 3 | 2 | 3 | 2 | 4 | 2 | 2 | 5 | 4 | 1 | 2 | 1 | 2 | 3 | 6 | 462 |
| 3 | (United States) Aaron Plessinger | KTM | 3 | 12 | 5 | 2 | 5 | 8 | 5 | 5 | 12 | 4 | 4 | 2 | 3 | 5 | 2 | 3 | 3 | 4 | 3 | 3 | 2 | 2 | 403 |
| 4 | (United States) Justin Cooper | Yamaha | 5 | 8 | 4 | 3 | 3 | 3 | 4 | 6 | 5 | 6 | 3 | 6 | 5 | 3 | 3 | 7 | 4 | 7 | 20 | 4 | 6 | 4 | 371 |
| 5 | (United States) Jason Anderson | Kawasaki | 10 | 4 | 3 | 5 | 10 | 4 | 7 | 4 | 4 | Ret | 5 | 3 | 4 | 4 | 4 | 2 | 5 | 5 | 5 | 6 | 5 | 5 | 362 |
| 6 | (United States) Malcolm Stewart | Husqvarna | 8 | 7 | 7 | 9 | 7 | 7 | 9 | 9 | 8 | 16 | 6 | 7 | 8 | 15 | 10 | 6 | 10 | 9 | 6 | 5 | 7 | 11 | 297 |
| 7 | (France) Dylan Ferrandis | Honda | 7 | 5 | 6 | 8 | 8 | 9 | 6 | 7 | 7 | 5 | 19 | 5 | 6 | 6 | 6 | 5 | 6 | 3 | Ret | 7 | Ret | DNS | 288 |
| 8 | (United States) Christian Craig | Husqvarna | 15 | 17 | 12 | 11 | 9 | 10 | Ret | 13 | 20 | 8 | 8 | 13 | 7 | 7 | 7 | 12 | 9 | 8 | 7 | 8 | 10 | 7 | 244 |
| 9 | (Australia) Jett Lawrence | Honda | 1 | 1 | 24 | 6 | 2 | 1 | 1 | 1 | 1 | 2 | | | | | | | | | | | | | 210 |
| 10 | (Sweden) Fredrik Norén | Kawasaki | 13 | 10 | 9 | 10 | 11 | 11 | 19 | 11 | 19 | 17 | 16 | Ret | 19 | 10 | 8 | 8 | 12 | 11 | 17 | 9 | 9 | 9 | 204 |
| 11 | (United States) Phil Nicoletti | Yamaha | 9 | 9 | 10 | Ret | | | 11 | 20 | 9 | 9 | 28 | 10 | 9 | 8 | Ret | 13 | 13 | 15 | 8 | 12 | 8 | 8 | 193 |
| 12 | (Estonia) Harri Kullas | KTM | | | 15 | 13 | | | 13 | 17 | 10 | 10 | 9 | 12 | 10 | 12 | 13 | 10 | 15 | 12 | 14 | 26 | 12 | 14 | 163 |
| 13 | (United States) Marshal Weltin | Yamaha | 16 | 11 | 14 | 16 | 13 | 13 | 18 | 12 | 23 | Ret | 17 | 14 | 13 | 13 | 11 | 9 | 14 | Ret | 13 | 15 | 11 | 13 | 162 |
| 14 | (United States) Justin Barcia | Gas Gas | 6 | 6 | 8 | 7 | 4 | 6 | 10 | 8 | 6 | 11 | | | | | | | | | | | | | 148 |
| 15 | (United States) Grant Harlan | Yamaha | 17 | 18 | 11 | 12 | 12 | 14 | 12 | 14 | Ret | 18 | 11 | 11 | 23 | 22 | 9 | Ret | 11 | 10 | 30 | 14 | 14 | Ret | 144 |
| 16 | (United States) Shane McElrath | Suzuki | 30 | 14 | 21 | 24 | 22 | 16 | 8 | 10 | 27 | 14 | 13 | 19 | 16 | 9 | 21 | 21 | | | | | | | 118 |
| 16 | (United States) Shane McElrath | Kawasaki | | | | | | | | | | | | | | | | | 16 | 13 | 22 | 23 | 13 | 10 | 118 |
| 17 | (France) Romain Pape | Gas Gas | 20 | 13 | 26 | 17 | 16 | 15 | 14 | 22 | 26 | 20 | 24 | 16 | 11 | 17 | 12 | Ret | 19 | 16 | 12 | 13 | 24 | 15 | 106 |
| 18 | (United States) Derek Kelley | KTM | 14 | Ret | 13 | 15 | Ret | DNS | 16 | 15 | 22 | Ret | 20 | Ret | 21 | 11 | 14 | 11 | 20 | Ret | 15 | 17 | 18 | 16 | 94 |
| 19 | (United States) Cullin Park | Honda | 12 | 15 | 18 | 19 | 20 | 19 | 35 | Ret | 13 | 21 | 15 | 26 | 14 | 27 | 18 | 14 | 25 | 21 | 11 | 18 | 16 | 19 | 91 |
| 20 | (United States) Kyle Chisholm | Suzuki | 28 | 21 | 17 | 23 | 23 | 18 | 20 | Ret | 21 | 15 | 21 | 18 | 12 | 16 | 15 | 16 | 22 | 17 | 16 | 19 | 21 | 17 | 74 |
| 21 | (United States) Eli Tomac | Yamaha | | | | | | | | | | | | | | | | | | | 4 | 11 | 4 | 3 | 67 |
| 22 | (United States) Garrett Marchbanks | Yamaha | | | | | | | | | 15 | 12 | 7 | 8 | Ret | 18 | | | | | | | | | 50 |
| 23 | (Australia) Kyle Webster | Honda | | | | | | | | | 17 | 7 | 10 | 9 | | | | | | | | | | | 45 |
| 24 | (United Kingdom) Dean Wilson | Honda | 11 | 16 | | | | | | | | | DNQ | DNQ | | | 16 | 17 | | | Ret | 21 | 17 | 12 | 44 |
| 25 | (United States) Broc Tickle | Kawasaki | | | | | | | | | | | 12 | 15 | | | | | | | 9 | 10 | | | 42 |
| 26 | (Venezuela) Anthony Rodríguez | KTM | Ret | 24 | 19 | 18 | 30 | 20 | Ret | Ret | DNQ | 27 | 14 | 20 | 15 | 14 | Ret | 18 | 27 | 19 | Ret | DNS | Ret | DNS | 41 |
| 27 | (United States) Justin Hill | KTM | 19 | 26 | 16 | 14 | 14 | 12 | | | | | | | | | | | | | | | | | 35 |
| 28 | (Germany) Ken Roczen | Suzuki | | | | | | | | | | | | | | | | | 6 | 5 | | | | | 31 |
| 29 | (Venezuela) Lorenzo Locurcio | Gas Gas | 29 | 23 | 23 | 20 | 17 | 17 | 27 | 19 | 24 | 26 | DNQ | DNQ | Ret | 21 | 25 | 15 | 28 | 20 | 23 | 16 | Ret | DNS | 31 |
| 30 | (United States) Jerry Robin | Yamaha | 18 | 22 | 20 | 21 | 15 | Ret | 22 | 23 | 18 | Ret | Ret | DNS | | | | | 18 | Ret | DNS | DNS | 19 | Ret | 25 |
| 31 | (United States) Jeremy Hand | Honda | | | | | 27 | 23 | 15 | 18 | 31 | 29 | 27 | 28 | | | | | 24 | 18 | 18 | 20 | 23 | 24 | 21 |
| 32 | (Sweden) Alvin Östlund | Honda | | | | | | | | | 11 | 24 | 18 | 17 | | | | | | | | | | | 20 |
| 33 | (Germany) Henry Jacobi | KTM | | | | | | | | | | | | | | | | | 17 | Ret | 10 | Ret | | | 17 |
| 34 | (Estonia) Gert Krestinov | Honda | | | | | | | | | 16 | 13 | 23 | 27 | 24 | Ret | | | | | | | | | 15 |
| 35 | (United States) Cooper Webb | Yamaha | | | | | | | | | | | | | | | | | 8 | Ret | | | | | 14 |
| 36 | (United States) Henry Miller | Honda | 32 | 30 | | | 21 | 21 | 17 | 21 | DNQ | DNQ | 31 | 23 | 17 | Ret | | | | | 25 | 24 | 22 | 22 | 13 |
| 37 | (United States) Max Miller | Suzuki | 27 | 19 | 29 | 25 | 19 | 22 | 28 | 26 | 36 | 25 | 29 | 25 | 26 | 20 | 17 | 30 | Ret | DNS | 31 | 35 | Ret | 27 | 13 |
| 38 | (United States) Colt Nichols | Suzuki | | | | | | | | | | | | | | | | | 23 | 14 | 19 | Ret | Ret | DNS | 11 |
| 39 | (United States) Devin Simonson | Yamaha | | | | | | | | | | | | | | | | | | | DNQ | 28 | 15 | 18 | 11 |
| 40 | (France) Scotty Verhaeghe | Gas Gas | 24 | 20 | 27 | Ret | 24 | 25 | 21 | 16 | 28 | Ret | 22 | 22 | 27 | 23 | 27 | 22 | | | | | | | 9 |
| 41 | (United States) James Harrington | Yamaha | | | DNQ | DNQ | 32 | 26 | DNQ | DNQ | 14 | 22 | 25 | 29 | 31 | 28 | | | DNQ | DNQ | | | | | 8 |
| 42 | (United States) Bryce Shelly | Yamaha | Ret | 29 | 22 | Ret | 18 | 27 | 24 | 25 | 25 | Ret | 26 | 21 | 28 | 32 | Ret | 25 | 21 | 22 | 24 | 25 | 20 | 23 | 8 |
| 43 | (United States) John Short | Kawasaki | DNQ | DNQ | DNQ | DNQ | DNQ | DNQ | DNQ | DNQ | DNQ | DNQ | | | DNQ | DNQ | 20 | 19 | | | | | | | 5 |
| 44 | (United States) Trevin Nelson | Yamaha | | | | | | | 26 | 32 | | | 32 | 24 | 20 | 19 | | | | | | | | | 5 |
| 45 | (United States) Ryder Floyd | Honda | 22 | 36 | 25 | 27 | 28 | 30 | 34 | 27 | DNQ | DNQ | | | 18 | 30 | 26 | 26 | | | | | | | 4 |
| 46 | (United States) Carson Brown | Yamaha | | | | | | | | | | | | | | | 19 | 23 | | | | | | | 3 |
| 47 | (United States) Tristan Lane | KTM | | | | | | | | | 29 | 19 | DNQ | Ret | | | | | | | | | | | 3 |
| 48 | (South Africa) Tristan Purdon | Husqvarna | | | 28 | 22 | 25 | 24 | 23 | 24 | | | | | | | | | 26 | 26 | 21 | 27 | Ret | 20 | 3 |
| 49 | (United States) Jake Masterpool | Gas Gas | 21 | Ret | Ret | Ret | | | | | DNQ | DNQ | DNQ | DNQ | | | Ret | 20 | 29 | DNS | | | | | 3 |
| 50 | (United States) Preston Kilroy | Yamaha | | | | | | | | | | | | | | | | | | | 33 | 22 | Ret | 21 | 1 |
| | (Australia) Brad West | Yamaha | 25 | 25 | Ret | 26 | | | | | | | | | | | 22 | Ret | | | | | | | 0 |
| | (United States) Josh Boaz | KTM | 36 | 35 | DNQ | DNQ | 35 | 35 | DNQ | DNQ | Ret | DNS | | | 22 | 31 | | | | | | | | | 0 |
| | (United States) Zack Williams | Honda | 23 | 32 | 31 | 28 | DNQ | 31 | 29 | 29 | | | DNQ | DNQ | Ret | 29 | 23 | 24 | 30 | 24 | 29 | 33 | | | 0 |
| | (United States) Izaih Clark | Honda | | | | | | | | | | | 36 | 33 | 25 | 24 | | | 31 | 23 | 28 | 29 | 25 | Ret | 0 |
| | (United States) Justin Cokinos | Gas Gas | | | | | | | 33 | Ret | 30 | 23 | DNQ | DNQ | | | | | 36 | 30 | | | | | 0 |
| | (United States) Brandan Leith | Kawasaki | | | | | DNQ | DNQ | | | | | | | | | 24 | Ret | | | | | | | 0 |
| | (United States) Vinny Luhovey | Honda | | | | | | | Ret | Ret | DNQ | DNQ | Ret | Ret | | | | | 32 | 25 | 26 | 31 | 27 | Ret | 0 |
| | (United States) Justin Rodbell | KTM | | | | | | | 25 | 28 | 35 | 30 | | | | | | | | | | | | | 0 |
| | (United States) Justin Rodbell | Yamaha | | | | | | | | | | | | | Ret | 35 | | | 37 | 34 | 27 | 34 | 30 | 33 | 0 |
| | (United States) Kevin Moranz | KTM | | | | | | | | | | | 34 | 30 | 29 | 25 | | | | | | | 28 | 30 | 0 |
| | (United States) Cade Clason | Kawasaki | | | | | | | 32 | 31 | | | DNQ | DNQ | | | | | | | | | Ret | 25 | 0 |
| | (United States) Jace Kessler | Yamaha | | | | | DNQ | DNQ | 37 | 30 | DNQ | DNQ | 37 | 35 | DNQ | DNQ | | | DNQ | DNQ | 32 | 30 | 26 | 26 | 0 |
| | (United States) Tyler Stepek | Honda | | | 36 | Ret | 26 | 29 | DNQ | DNQ | Ret | Ret | DNQ | DNQ | | | | | Ret | 27 | 34 | 36 | | | 0 |
| | (United States) Chandler Baker | Husqvarna | | | | | 34 | 28 | | | | | | | Ret | 26 | | | | | | | | | 0 |
| | (United States) Robbie Wageman | Yamaha | 26 | 31 | 33 | Ret | | | | | | | | | | | | | | | | | | | 0 |
| | (United States) Bryce Hammond | Yamaha | 31 | 27 | DNQ | DNQ | DNQ | DNQ | DNQ | DNQ | DNQ | DNQ | | | | | 28 | DNS | DNQ | DNQ | | | | | 0 |
| | (United States) Kile Epperson | Honda | DNQ | DNQ | DNQ | DNQ | DNQ | DNQ | DNQ | DNQ | DNQ | DNQ | DNQ | DNQ | 33 | 33 | 29 | 27 | DNQ | DNQ | DNQ | DNQ | 31 | 32 | 0 |
| | (United Kingdom) Charlie Putnam | Husqvarna | | | DNQ | DNQ | DNQ | DNQ | DNQ | DNQ | | | | | | | | | DNQ | 28 | DNQ | DNQ | DNQ | 28 | 0 |
| | (United States) Ayden Shive | Kawasaki | DNQ | DNQ | 30 | 29 | 29 | DNS | DNQ | DNQ | 32 | 28 | 35 | 31 | 30 | 36 | | | 35 | 29 | | | | | 0 |
| | (United States) C.J. Tucker | Yamaha | | | 35 | 32 | | | | | | | | | | | 31 | 28 | | | | | | | 0 |
| | (United States) Luke Kalaitzian | Honda | 34 | 28 | DNQ | DNQ | | | | | | | | | | | | | | | | | | | 0 |
| | (United States) Jaxon Pascal | Honda | | | | | | | | | | | | | | | | | DNQ | DNQ | DNQ | DNQ | 29 | Ret | 0 |
| | (United States) Cory Carsten | Suzuki | DNQ | DNQ | DNQ | DNQ | DNQ | DNQ | | | DNQ | DNQ | DNQ | DNQ | | | | | | | | | DNQ | 29 | 0 |
| | (United States) Ryan Peters | Kawasaki | | | | | | | | | | | DNQ | DNQ | DNQ | DNQ | DNQ | 29 | | | | | | | 0 |
| | (United States) Jeff Walker | Gas Gas | DNQ | DNQ | 37 | 31 | 33 | 36 | DNQ | DNQ | DNQ | DNQ | 30 | Ret | DNQ | DNQ | | | | | | | 32 | Ret | 0 |
| | (United States) Hayden Cordell | Honda | | | | | | | | | | | | | | | 30 | 31 | | | | | | | 0 |
| | (Australia) Zachary Watson | KTM | | | 34 | 30 | | | | | | | | | | | | | | | | | | | 0 |
| | (United States) Bryton Carroll | Yamaha | DNQ | DNQ | DNQ | DNQ | DNQ | DNQ | 30 | Ret | DNQ | DNQ | DNQ | DNQ | DNQ | DNQ | | | 38 | Ret | | | | | 0 |
| | (United States) Luca Marsalisi | Honda | DNQ | DNQ | DNQ | DNQ | 31 | 34 | 31 | Ret | | | | | | | | | | | | | | | 0 |
| | (United States) Sebastian Balbuena | Yamaha | | | | | | | DNQ | DNQ | 34 | Ret | | | | | | | DNQ | 31 | DNQ | DNQ | | | 0 |
| | (United States) Cody Groves | Kawasaki | | | | | | | DNQ | DNQ | DNQ | DNQ | DNQ | DNQ | | | | | DNQ | DNQ | DNQ | DNQ | DNQ | 31 | 0 |
| | (United States) Colton Eigenmann | Yamaha | 38 | Ret | 38 | 33 | DNQ | DNQ | DNQ | DNQ | DNQ | DNQ | 38 | 34 | 32 | 34 | Ret | Ret | DNQ | DNQ | | | | | 0 |
| | (United States) Jack Rogers | Kawasaki | | | | | | | DNQ | DNQ | DNQ | DNQ | | | | | | | 34 | 33 | DNQ | 32 | | | 0 |
| | (United States) Scott Meshey | KTM | | | | | | | | | DNQ | DNQ | | | Ret | Ret | | | 33 | 32 | | | | | 0 |
| | (Japan) Takumu Yokosawa | Honda | | | | | | | | | DNQ | DNQ | 33 | 32 | DNQ | DNQ | Ret | DNS | | | | | | | 0 |
| | (United States) Chris Cornish | Yamaha | | | DNQ | DNQ | | | | | | | | | | | 33 | 32 | | | | | | | 0 |
| | (United States) Josh Mosiman | KTM | 37 | 37 | 32 | 34 | | | | | | | | | | | | | | | | | | | 0 |
| | (United States) Blake Ballard | Yamaha | | | DNQ | DNQ | | | | | | | | | | | 32 | Ret | | | | | | | 0 |
| | (United Kingdom) Brad Todd | Honda | | | | | DNQ | 32 | | | | | | | | | | | | | | | | | 0 |
| | (United States) Dayton Briggs | Husqvarna | 33 | 34 | DNQ | DNQ | DNQ | DNQ | | | | | | | | | | | | | | | | | 0 |
| | (Australia) Joel Wightman | Yamaha | 35 | 33 | | | | | | | | | | | | | | | | | | | | | 0 |
| | (United States) Gage Stine | Yamaha | | | | | 37 | 33 | 36 | Ret | DNQ | DNQ | | | | | | | | | | | | | 0 |
| | (United States) Joe Tait | Yamaha | | | | | | | DNQ | DNQ | 33 | Ret | | | | | | | | | | | | | 0 |
| | (United States) Matt Hubert | Yamaha | | | | | | | | | | | | | | | DNQ | 33 | | | | | | | 0 |
| | (United States) Mitchell Zaremba | Yamaha | | | | | DNQ | DNQ | DNQ | DNQ | | | DNQ | DNQ | 34 | 37 | | | | | | | | | 0 |
| | (United States) Eddie Norred | Kawasaki | DNQ | DNQ | DNQ | DNQ | DNQ | DNQ | DNQ | DNQ | | | DNQ | DNQ | DNQ | DNQ | DNQ | DNQ | DNQ | DNQ | DNQ | DNQ | DNQ | 34 | 0 |
| | (United States) Ryan Diezic | KTM | | | | | | | DNQ | DNQ | | | DNQ | DNQ | DNQ | DNQ | | | DNQ | DNQ | 35 | Ret | DNQ | DNQ | 0 |
| | (United States) Matthew Burkeen | Yamaha | | | | | 36 | 38 | | | | | | | | | | | DNQ | DNQ | DNQ | DNQ | | | 0 |
| | (United States) Dawson Draycott | KTM | | | | | Ret | 37 | | | | | | | | | | | | | | | | | 0 |
| | (United States) Jason Brooks | Yamaha | | | | | | | | | 37 | Ret | | | | | | | | | | | | | 0 |
| | (United States) Jeremy Smith | Honda | | | | | 38 | 39 | | | | | | | | | | | | | | | | | 0 |
| | (United States) Bobby Piazza | Yamaha | | | | | DNQ | DNQ | DNQ | DNQ | | | | | | | | | DNQ | DNQ | Ret | Ret | | | 0 |
| | (United States) Dante Oliveira | KTM | | | | | | | | | | | | | | | Ret | DNS | | | | | | | 0 |
| | (United States) Gared Steinke | Husqvarna | | | DNQ | DNQ | | | | | | | | | | | DNS | DNS | | | | | | | 0 |
| | (United States) Brandon Pederson | Yamaha | DNQ | DNQ | DNQ | DNQ | DNQ | DNQ | DNQ | DNQ | DNQ | DNQ | DNQ | DNQ | DNQ | DNQ | DNQ | DNQ | | | DNQ | DNQ | | | 0 |
| | (United States) Cameron Horner | Honda | DNQ | DNQ | DNQ | DNQ | DNQ | DNQ | DNQ | DNQ | DNQ | DNQ | DNQ | DNQ | DNQ | DNQ | DNQ | DNQ | | | | | | | 0 |
| | (United States) Evan Talbott | Yamaha | | | | | | | DNQ | DNQ | DNQ | DNQ | DNQ | DNQ | DNQ | DNQ | DNQ | DNQ | DNQ | DNQ | DNQ | DNQ | DNQ | DNQ | 0 |
| | (United States) Nick Inman | KTM | DNQ | DNQ | DNQ | DNQ | DNQ | DNQ | DNQ | DNQ | DNQ | DNQ | DNQ | DNQ | | | | | | | | | DNQ | DNQ | 0 |
| | (United States) Logan Boye | Kawasaki | DNQ | DNQ | DNQ | DNQ | DNQ | DNQ | DNQ | DNQ | | | | | | | | | DNQ | DNQ | DNQ | DNQ | DNQ | DNQ | 0 |
| | (United States) Matthew Jackson | Honda | | | | | | | DNQ | DNQ | DNQ | DNQ | DNQ | DNQ | | | | | DNQ | DNQ | DNQ | DNQ | DNQ | DNQ | 0 |
| | (United States) Blaze Cremaldi | Yamaha | DNQ | DNQ | DNQ | DNQ | DNQ | DNQ | DNQ | DNQ | DNQ | DNQ | | | | | | | | | | | | | 0 |
| | (United States) Brayden Lessler | KTM | DNQ | DNQ | DNQ | DNQ | DNQ | DNQ | DNQ | DNQ | | | | | | | DNQ | DNQ | | | | | | | 0 |
| | (United States) Casey Carmichael | Yamaha | DNQ | DNQ | DNQ | DNQ | DNQ | DNQ | | | | | DNQ | DNQ | | | DNQ | DNQ | | | | | | | 0 |
| | (United States) Noah Miesen | Yamaha | DNQ | DNQ | DNQ | DNQ | DNQ | DNQ | | | | | | | DNQ | DNQ | | | | | DNQ | DNQ | | | 0 |
| | (United States) Gavin Mays | KTM | | | | | DNQ | DNQ | DNQ | DNQ | | | DNQ | DNQ | | | | | | | DNQ | DNQ | DNQ | DNQ | 0 |
| | (United States) Karter DeLong | Yamaha | | | | | | | DNQ | DNQ | DNQ | DNQ | DNQ | DNQ | DNQ | DNQ | | | | | | | DNQ | DNQ | 0 |
| | (United States) TJ Squib | Yamaha | | | | | | | DNQ | DNQ | | | DNQ | DNQ | | | | | DNQ | DNQ | DNQ | DNQ | DNQ | DNQ | 0 |
| | (United States) Jacob Beverage | Yamaha | | | | | | | DNQ | DNQ | | | DNQ | DNQ | | | | | DNQ | DNQ | DNQ | DNQ | DNQ | DNQ | 0 |
| | (United States) Riley Ripper | Husqvarna | DNQ | DNQ | DNQ | DNQ | DNQ | DNQ | | | | | | | DNQ | DNQ | | | | | | | | | 0 |
| | (United States) Kevin Clinton | Yamaha | DNQ | DNQ | DNQ | DNQ | DNQ | DNQ | | | | | | | | | DNQ | DNQ | | | | | | | 0 |
| | (United States) Nathan Murphy | Yamaha | | | | | | | DNQ | DNQ | DNQ | DNQ | | | | | | | DNQ | DNQ | DNQ | DNQ | | | 0 |
| | (United States) Zach Peters | Honda | | | | | | | DNQ | DNQ | | | DNQ | DNQ | | | | | DNQ | DNQ | | | DNQ | DNQ | 0 |
| | (United States) Jack Winland | Yamaha | | | | | | | DNQ | DNQ | | | DNQ | DNQ | | | | | | | DNQ | DNQ | DNQ | DNQ | 0 |
| | (United States) Bennett Mantooth | Yamaha | | | | | | | DNQ | DNQ | | | | | | | | | DNQ | DNQ | DNQ | DNQ | DNQ | DNQ | 0 |
| | (United States) Trevor Dunn | Suzuki | | | | | | | | | | | DNQ | DNQ | DNQ | DNQ | | | | | DNQ | DNQ | DNQ | DNQ | 0 |
| | (United States) Justin Kurtz | Kawasaki | | | | | | | | | | | | | DNQ | DNQ | | | DNQ | DNQ | DNQ | DNQ | DNQ | DNQ | 0 |
| | (United States) Jacob Glenn | KTM | DNQ | DNQ | DNQ | DNQ | DNQ | DNQ | | | | | | | | | | | | | | | | | 0 |
| | (United States) Jared Gumeson | Kawasaki | DNQ | DNQ | DNQ | DNQ | | | | | | | | | | | DNQ | DNQ | | | | | | | 0 |
| | (United States) Mike Kruger | KTM | | | | | DNQ | DNQ | | | | | DNQ | DNQ | DNQ | DNQ | | | | | | | | | 0 |
| | (United States) Will Stockland | Husqvarna | | | | | DNQ | DNQ | | | | | | | DNQ | DNQ | DNQ | DNQ | | | | | | | 0 |
| | (United States) Ryan Lechien | Yamaha | | | | | | | DNQ | DNQ | | | DNQ | DNQ | | | | | DNQ | DNQ | | | | | 0 |
| | (United States) Zach Gareis | Yamaha | | | | | | | DNQ | DNQ | | | DNQ | DNQ | | | | | | | | | DNQ | DNQ | 0 |
| | (United States) Brandon Hugney | Husqvarna | | | | | | | DNQ | DNQ | | | | | | | | | DNQ | DNQ | DNQ | DNQ | | | 0 |
| | (United States) Nick Smith | KTM | | | | | | | DNQ | DNQ | | | | | | | | | DNQ | DNQ | DNQ | DNQ | | | 0 |
| | (United States) Kyle Petrie | Kawasaki | | | | | | | | | DNQ | DNQ | DNQ | DNQ | DNQ | DNQ | | | | | | | | | 0 |
| | (Canada) Vincent Lauzon | Husqvarna | | | | | | | | | DNQ | DNQ | DNQ | DNQ | | | | | DNQ | DNQ | | | | | 0 |
| | (Brazil) Heberton Lima | Kawasaki | | | | | | | | | DNQ | DNQ | | | | | | | DNQ | DNQ | DNQ | DNQ | | | 0 |
| | (United States) Ethan Eslinger | KTM | | | | | | | | | | | DNQ | DNQ | DNQ | DNQ | | | | | | | DNQ | DNQ | 0 |
| | (United States) Bo Cooper | Yamaha | | | | | | | | | | | DNQ | DNQ | DNQ | DNQ | | | | | | | DNQ | DNQ | 0 |
| | (United States) Jordon Fancher | Honda | | | | | | | | | | | | | DNQ | DNQ | | | | | DNQ | DNQ | DNQ | DNQ | 0 |
| | (Netherlands) Robert Fobbe | Kawasaki | DNQ | DNQ | DNQ | DNQ | | | | | | | | | | | | | | | | | | | 0 |
| | (United States) Dylan Kappeler | Yamaha | DNQ | DNQ | DNQ | DNQ | | | | | | | | | | | | | | | | | | | 0 |
| | (United States) Jack Saggau | Yamaha | DNQ | DNQ | DNQ | DNQ | | | | | | | | | | | | | | | | | | | 0 |
| | (United States) Eric Rivera | Kawasaki | DNQ | DNQ | DNQ | DNQ | | | | | | | | | | | | | | | | | | | 0 |
| | (United States) Jordan Isola | Honda | DNQ | DNQ | DNQ | DNQ | | | | | | | | | | | | | | | | | | | 0 |
| | (United States) Conner Lords | Yamaha | DNQ | DNQ | | | DNQ | DNQ | | | | | | | | | | | | | | | | | 0 |
| | (United States) Jonah Schmidt | Yamaha | DNQ | DNQ | | | | | | | | | | | | | DNQ | DNQ | | | | | | | 0 |
| | (United States) Jimmy Hazel | Kawasaki | | | DNQ | DNQ | | | | | | | | | | | DNQ | DNQ | | | | | | | 0 |
| | (United States) Brad Burkhart | Kawasaki | | | DNQ | DNQ | | | | | | | | | | | DNQ | DNQ | | | | | | | 0 |
| | (United States) Jack Ferrell | Yamaha | | | DNQ | DNQ | | | | | | | | | | | DNQ | DNQ | | | | | | | 0 |
| | (United States) Kyle Koosmann | Yamaha | | | | | DNQ | DNQ | | | | | DNQ | DNQ | | | | | | | | | | | 0 |
| | (United States) Skylar Olson | Yamaha | | | | | DNQ | DNQ | | | | | | | DNQ | DNQ | | | | | | | | | 0 |
| | (United States) Hunter Carmody | Kawasaki | | | | | DNQ | DNQ | | | | | | | | | DNQ | DNQ | | | | | | | 0 |
| | (United States) Jayce Cannon | Gas Gas | | | | | DNQ | DNQ | | | | | | | | | DNQ | DNQ | | | | | | | 0 |
| | (United States) Pat McLam | Yamaha | | | | | DNQ | DNQ | | | | | | | | | DNQ | DNQ | | | | | | | 0 |
| | (United States) Vincent Harrison | Yamaha | | | | | | | DNQ | DNQ | DNQ | DNQ | | | | | | | | | | | | | 0 |
| | (United States) Skylar Leaf | KTM | | | | | | | DNQ | DNQ | | | DNQ | DNQ | | | | | | | | | | | 0 |
| | (United States) Caleb Hall | KTM | | | | | | | DNQ | DNQ | | | | | | | | | DNQ | DNQ | | | | | 0 |
| | (United States) Jacob Rose | KTM | | | | | | | DNQ | DNQ | | | | | | | | | | | DNQ | DNQ | | | 0 |
| | (United States) Patrick Anderson | Yamaha | | | | | | | DNQ | DNQ | | | | | | | | | | | DNQ | DNQ | | | 0 |
| | (United States) Cory Gilliam | Husqvarna | | | | | | | DNQ | DNQ | | | | | | | | | | | DNQ | DNQ | | | 0 |
| | (United States) Michael Lennon | KTM | | | | | | | DNQ | DNQ | | | | | | | | | | | DNQ | DNQ | | | 0 |
| | (United States) Jayden Shindel | KTM | | | | | | | DNQ | DNQ | | | | | | | | | | | DNQ | DNQ | | | 0 |
| | (United States) Mike Witkowski | Honda | | | | | | | | | DNQ | DNQ | DNQ | DNQ | | | | | | | | | | | 0 |
| | (United States) Kris Corey | KTM | | | | | | | | | DNQ | DNQ | | | | | | | DNQ | DNQ | | | | | 0 |
| | (United States) Kyle Bushee | Yamaha | | | | | | | | | DNQ | DNQ | | | | | | | DNQ | DNQ | | | | | 0 |
| | (United States) Nick Kraeger | Honda | | | | | | | | | DNQ | DNQ | | | | | | | DNQ | DNQ | | | | | 0 |
| | (United States) Scott Iverson | KTM | | | | | | | | | DNQ | DNQ | | | | | | | DNQ | DNQ | | | | | 0 |
| | (United States) Trevor Brown | Gas Gas | | | | | | | | | DNQ | DNQ | | | | | | | DNQ | DNQ | | | | | 0 |
| | (United States) Jimmy Hebert | Gas Gas | | | | | | | | | DNQ | DNQ | | | | | | | DNQ | DNQ | | | | | 0 |
| | (United States) Billy Clark | Gas Gas | | | | | | | | | DNQ | DNQ | | | | | | | | | | | DNQ | DNQ | 0 |
| | (United States) Collin Hinrichs | KTM | | | | | | | | | | | DNQ | DNQ | DNQ | DNQ | | | | | | | | | 0 |
| | (United States) Nicholas Hunt | Honda | | | | | | | | | | | DNQ | DNQ | DNQ | DNQ | | | | | | | | | 0 |
| | (United States) Hayden Justice | Yamaha | | | | | | | | | | | DNQ | DNQ | | | | | | | DNQ | DNQ | | | 0 |
| | (United States) Ivon Hays | Gas Gas | | | | | | | | | | | DNQ | DNQ | | | | | | | | | DNQ | DNQ | 0 |
| | (United States) Zane Klemz | KTM | | | | | | | | | | | DNQ | DNQ | | | | | | | | | DNQ | DNQ | 0 |
| | (United States) Landon Armbruster | Honda | | | | | | | | | | | DNQ | DNQ | | | | | | | | | DNQ | DNQ | 0 |
| | (United States) Isaac Langston | Gas Gas | | | | | | | | | | | DNQ | DNQ | | | | | | | | | DNQ | DNQ | 0 |
| | (United States) Dawson Kaub | Kawasaki | | | | | | | | | | | | | DNQ | DNQ | DNQ | DNQ | | | | | | | 0 |
| | (United States) Ronnie Orres | Honda | | | | | | | | | | | | | DNQ | DNQ | | | | | | | DNQ | DNQ | 0 |
| | (United States) Cameron Skaalerud | KTM | | | | | | | | | | | | | DNQ | DNQ | | | | | | | DNQ | DNQ | 0 |
| | (United States) Kollin Lund | KTM | | | | | | | | | | | | | DNQ | DNQ | | | | | | | DNQ | DNQ | 0 |
| | (United States) Brendan Grgurich | Yamaha | | | | | | | | | | | | | DNQ | DNQ | | | | | | | DNQ | DNQ | 0 |
| | (United States) Nick Gonzales | KTM | | | | | | | | | | | | | | | DNQ | DNQ | | | | | DNQ | DNQ | 0 |
| | (United States) Josh Hoover | Husqvarna | | | | | | | | | | | | | | | | | DNQ | DNQ | DNQ | DNQ | | | 0 |
| | (United States) Ian Kearon | Yamaha | | | | | | | | | | | | | | | | | DNQ | DNQ | DNQ | DNQ | | | 0 |
| | (United States) Adam Dobrovich | KTM | | | | | | | | | | | | | | | | | DNQ | DNQ | DNQ | DNQ | | | 0 |
| | (United States) Brett Heidorn | Kawasaki | | | | | | | | | | | | | | | | | | | DNQ | DNQ | DNQ | DNQ | 0 |
| | (Australia) Travis Silk | KTM | DNQ | DNQ | | | | | | | | | | | | | | | | | | | | | 0 |
| | (United States) Ezra Lewis | Yamaha | DNQ | DNQ | | | | | | | | | | | | | | | | | | | | | 0 |
| | (United States) Cole Cook | KTM | DNQ | DNQ | | | | | | | | | | | | | | | | | | | | | 0 |
| | (United States) Dominic Desimone | Honda | DNQ | DNQ | | | | | | | | | | | | | | | | | | | | | 0 |
| | (United States) Kai Aiello | Husqvarna | | | DNQ | DNQ | | | | | | | | | | | | | | | | | | | 0 |
| | (United States) Tyler DuCray | KTM | | | DNQ | DNQ | | | | | | | | | | | | | | | | | | | 0 |
| | (United States) Brian DeRuyter | Husqvarna | | | DNQ | DNQ | | | | | | | | | | | | | | | | | | | 0 |
| | (United States) Anthony Gonsalves | Kawasaki | | | DNQ | DNQ | | | | | | | | | | | | | | | | | | | 0 |
| | (United States) Matt Barber | KTM | | | DNQ | DNQ | | | | | | | | | | | | | | | | | | | 0 |
| | (United States) Jeffrey Gorman | Honda | | | DNQ | DNQ | | | | | | | | | | | | | | | | | | | 0 |
| | (United States) Matthew Curler | KTM | | | | | DNQ | DNQ | | | | | | | | | | | | | | | | | 0 |
| | (United States) McCoy Brough | Honda | | | | | DNQ | DNQ | | | | | | | | | | | | | | | | | 0 |
| | (Mexico) Jorge Rubalcava | Husqvarna | | | | | DNQ | DNQ | | | | | | | | | | | | | | | | | 0 |
| | (United States) Jeremy Kowalsky | Honda | | | | | DNQ | DNQ | | | | | | | | | | | | | | | | | 0 |
| | (United States) Charles Tolleson | Gas Gas | | | | | DNQ | DNQ | | | | | | | | | | | | | | | | | 0 |
| | (United States) John Citrola | Yamaha | | | | | DNQ | DNQ | | | | | | | | | | | | | | | | | 0 |
| | (United States) Koltyn Thompson | Yamaha | | | | | DNQ | DNQ | | | | | | | | | | | | | | | | | 0 |
| | (United States) Taylor Beckwith | KTM | | | | | | | DNQ | DNQ | | | | | | | | | | | | | | | 0 |
| | (United States) Trevor Schmidt | KTM | | | | | | | DNQ | DNQ | | | | | | | | | | | | | | | 0 |
| | (United States) Joey DeNeen | Husqvarna | | | | | | | DNQ | DNQ | | | | | | | | | | | | | | | 0 |
| | (United States) Dustin Jensen | KTM | | | | | | | DNQ | DNQ | | | | | | | | | | | | | | | 0 |
| | (United States) Trent Yoder | Honda | | | | | | | DNQ | DNQ | | | | | | | | | | | | | | | 0 |
| | (United States) Cory Broyles | Kawasaki | | | | | | | DNQ | DNQ | | | | | | | | | | | | | | | 0 |
| | (United States) Ricci Randanella | Kawasaki | | | | | | | | | DNQ | DNQ | | | | | | | | | | | | | 0 |
| | (United States) Marshall MacIntyre | Kawasaki | | | | | | | | | DNQ | DNQ | | | | | | | | | | | | | 0 |
| | (United States) Seamus Sullivan | Honda | | | | | | | | | DNQ | DNQ | | | | | | | | | | | | | 0 |
| | (United States) Steve Avery | KTM | | | | | | | | | DNQ | DNQ | | | | | | | | | | | | | 0 |
| | (United States) Zach Johnson | KTM | | | | | | | | | DNQ | DNQ | | | | | | | | | | | | | 0 |
| | (United States) Shawn MacDonald | Yamaha | | | | | | | | | DNQ | DNQ | | | | | | | | | | | | | 0 |
| | (United States) Matty Silva | Yamaha | | | | | | | | | DNQ | DNQ | | | | | | | | | | | | | 0 |
| | (United States) Peyton Jackson | Husqvarna | | | | | | | | | DNQ | DNQ | | | | | | | | | | | | | 0 |
| | (United States) Deven Sorensen | Honda | | | | | | | | | DNQ | DNQ | | | | | | | | | | | | | 0 |
| | (United States) Juan Paul Sanchez | KTM | | | | | | | | | DNQ | DNQ | | | | | | | | | | | | | 0 |
| | (United States) Shane Kelleher | Honda | | | | | | | | | DNQ | DNQ | | | | | | | | | | | | | 0 |
| | (United States) James Manni | Yamaha | | | | | | | | | DNQ | DNQ | | | | | | | | | | | | | 0 |
| | (United States) Matt Tovani | Yamaha | | | | | | | | | DNQ | DNQ | | | | | | | | | | | | | 0 |
| | (United States) Ryan Wadsworth | Yamaha | | | | | | | | | DNQ | DNQ | | | | | | | | | | | | | 0 |
| | (United States) Griffin Maxwell | Kawasaki | | | | | | | | | | | DNQ | DNQ | | | | | | | | | | | 0 |
| | (United States) Kyle Vidovich | Honda | | | | | | | | | | | DNQ | DNQ | | | | | | | | | | | 0 |
| | (United States) Michael Kitzmiller | Yamaha | | | | | | | | | | | DNQ | DNQ | | | | | | | | | | | 0 |
| | (United States) Harris Huizenga | Husqvarna | | | | | | | | | | | | | DNQ | DNQ | | | | | | | | | 0 |
| | (United States) Travis Prier | Honda | | | | | | | | | | | | | DNQ | DNQ | | | | | | | | | 0 |
| | (United States) Nick Jackson | Yamaha | | | | | | | | | | | | | DNQ | DNQ | | | | | | | | | 0 |
| | (United States) Tayler Grall | Honda | | | | | | | | | | | | | DNQ | DNQ | | | | | | | | | 0 |
| | (United States) Brandon Green | Yamaha | | | | | | | | | | | | | DNQ | DNQ | | | | | | | | | 0 |
| | (United States) Mitchell Prescott | Honda | | | | | | | | | | | | | DNQ | DNQ | | | | | | | | | 0 |
| | (United States) Brett McLaud | Honda | | | | | | | | | | | | | DNQ | DNQ | | | | | | | | | 0 |
| | (United States) Bryce McLaud | Honda | | | | | | | | | | | | | DNQ | DNQ | | | | | | | | | 0 |
| | (Canada) Lucas Giardino | Honda | | | | | | | | | | | | | DNQ | DNQ | | | | | | | | | 0 |
| | (United States) Nick Reekers | KTM | | | | | | | | | | | | | DNQ | DNQ | | | | | | | | | 0 |
| | (United States) Jeff Shuck | Kawasaki | | | | | | | | | | | | | DNQ | DNQ | | | | | | | | | 0 |
| | (United States) Chance Blackburn | Yamaha | | | | | | | | | | | | | | | DNQ | DNQ | | | | | | | 0 |
| | (United States) Connor Olson | Gas Gas | | | | | | | | | | | | | | | DNQ | DNQ | | | | | | | 0 |
| | (United States) Neal Allen | Yamaha | | | | | | | | | | | | | | | DNQ | DNQ | | | | | | | 0 |
| | (United States) Corey Kirkland | Honda | | | | | | | | | | | | | | | DNQ | DNQ | | | | | | | 0 |
| | (United States) Tommy Flora | Honda | | | | | | | | | | | | | | | DNQ | DNQ | | | | | | | 0 |
| | (United States) Talon Gorman | Honda | | | | | | | | | | | | | | | DNQ | DNQ | | | | | | | 0 |
| | (United States) Rider Fisher | Kawasaki | | | | | | | | | | | | | | | DNQ | DNQ | | | | | | | 0 |
| | (United States) Matt Thomas | Kawasaki | | | | | | | | | | | | | | | DNQ | DNQ | | | | | | | 0 |
| | (United States) Nick Niles | Yamaha | | | | | | | | | | | | | | | | | DNQ | DNQ | | | | | 0 |
| | (United States) Alex Panzarella | Kawasaki | | | | | | | | | | | | | | | | | DNQ | DNQ | | | | | 0 |
| | (United States) Mason Haberek | Kawasaki | | | | | | | | | | | | | | | | | DNQ | DNQ | | | | | 0 |
| | (United States) Daniel Netti | Yamaha | | | | | | | | | | | | | | | | | DNQ | DNQ | | | | | 0 |
| | (United States) Dustin Miller | Yamaha | | | | | | | | | | | | | | | | | | | DNQ | DNQ | | | 0 |
| | (United States) Austin Cozadd | Yamaha | | | | | | | | | | | | | | | | | | | DNQ | DNQ | | | 0 |
| | (United States) Anthony Roth | Yamaha | | | | | | | | | | | | | | | | | | | DNQ | DNQ | | | 0 |
| | (United States) Jason Dragonetti | Yamaha | | | | | | | | | | | | | | | | | | | DNQ | DNQ | | | 0 |
| | (United States) Kiliaen Van Rensselaer | Gas Gas | | | | | | | | | | | | | | | | | | | DNQ | DNQ | | | 0 |
| | (United States) Zachary Lahman | Yamaha | | | | | | | | | | | | | | | | | | | DNQ | DNQ | | | 0 |
| | (United States) James Churn | Gas Gas | | | | | | | | | | | | | | | | | | | DNQ | DNQ | | | 0 |
| | (United States) Jud Wisdom | Yamaha | | | | | | | | | | | | | | | | | | | | | DNQ | DNQ | 0 |
| | (United States) Spencer Winter | KTM | | | | | | | | | | | | | | | | | | | | | DNQ | DNQ | 0 |
| | (United States) Dean Gall | Honda | | | | | | | | | | | | | | | | | | | | | DNQ | DNQ | 0 |
| | (United States) Cody Hutchison | Yamaha | | | | | | | | | | | | | | | | | | | | | DNQ | DNQ | 0 |
| | (United States) Shane Kehoe | Yamaha | | | | | | | | | | | | | | | | | | | | | DNQ | DNQ | 0 |
| Pos | Rider | Bike | FOX (California) | | HAN (California) | | THU (Colorado) | | HIG (Pennsylvania) | | SOU (Massachusetts) | | RED (Michigan) | | SPR (Minnesota) | | WAS (Washington (state)) | | UNA (New York (state)) | | BUD (Maryland) | | IRN (Indiana) | | Points |

== 250cc ==
=== Entry list ===
| Team | Constructor | No | Rider | Rounds |
|---|---|---|---|---|
| Red Bull KTM Factory Racing USA | KTM | 16 | (France) Tom Vialle | All |
| Red Bull KTM Factory Racing USA | KTM | 929 | (United States) Julien Beaumer | 1–5, 7–11 |
| Triumph Racing | Triumph | 17 | (United States) Joey Savatgy | All |
| Triumph Racing | Triumph | 33 | (United States) Jalek Swoll | All |
| Rockstar Energy Husqvarna Factory Racing | Husqvarna | 24 | (United States) RJ Hampshire | 10–11 |
| Rockstar Energy Husqvarna Factory Racing | Husqvarna | 166 | (United States) Casey Cochran | 1–9 |
| Monster Energy Pro Circuit Kawasaki | Kawasaki | 26 | (United States) Garrett Marchbanks | 9–11 |
| Monster Energy Pro Circuit Kawasaki | Kawasaki | 29 | (United States) Ty Masterpool | All |
| Monster Energy Pro Circuit Kawasaki | Kawasaki | 47 | (United States) Levi Kitchen | All |
| Monster Energy Pro Circuit Kawasaki | Kawasaki | 593 | (United States) Drew Adams | 11 |
| Team Honda HRC | Honda | 30 | (Japan) Jo Shimoda | 1–9 |
| Team Honda HRC | Honda | 48 | (United States) Chance Hymas | All |
| Monster Energy Star Racing Yamaha | Yamaha | 31 | (United States) Jordon Smith | All |
| Monster Energy Star Racing Yamaha | Yamaha | 37 | (United Kingdom) Max Anstie | 5–11 |
| Monster Energy Star Racing Yamaha | Yamaha | 38 | (United States) Haiden Deegan | All |
| Monster Energy Star Racing Yamaha | Yamaha | 57 | (United States) Nate Thrasher | 1–2 |
| Monster Energy Star Racing Yamaha | Yamaha | 59 | (United States) Daxton Bennick | All |
| Monster Energy Star Racing Yamaha | Yamaha | 511 | (United States) Nick Romano | All |
| Troy Lee Designs Red Bull Gas Gas | GASGAS | 34 | (United States) Ryder DiFrancesco | All |
| Troy Lee Designs Red Bull Gas Gas | GASGAS | 39 | (United States) Pierce Brown | All |
| AEO Powersports KTM Racing | KTM | 35 | (United States) Talon Hawkins | All |
| AEO Powersports KTM Racing | KTM | 107 | (Canada) Ryder McNabb | 1–5 |
| AEO Powersports KTM Racing | KTM | 473 | (United States) Lux Turner | All |
| AEO Powersports KTM Racing | KTM | 775 | (United States) C.J. Benard | 1 |
| Toyota Redlands BARX Suzuki | Suzuki | 40 | (United States) Dilan Schwartz | All |
| Toyota Redlands BARX Suzuki | Suzuki | 100 | (France) Anthony Bourdon | 1 |
| Toyota Redlands BARX Suzuki | Suzuki | 128 | (United States) Preston Boespflug | 1–2, 8–11 |
| Toyota Redlands BARX Suzuki | Suzuki | 154 | (United States) Leo Tucker | 1–3, 5–7, 9–11 |
| Muc-Off FXR ClubMX Yamaha Racing | Yamaha | 69 | (United States) Coty Schock | 1–4, 9–11 |
| Muc-Off FXR ClubMX Yamaha Racing | Yamaha | 99 | (United States) Jett Reynolds | 1–8 |
| Muc-Off FXR ClubMX Yamaha Racing | Yamaha | 112 | (United States) Trevin Nelson | 10–11 |
| Muc-Off FXR ClubMX Yamaha Racing | Yamaha | 705 | (United States) Mark Fineis | All |
| MX Pro Parts/RJC Racing | KTM | 78 | (United States) Joshua Varize | 2 |
| HBI Racing Kawasaki | Kawasaki | 90 | (Chile) Hardy Muñoz | 1–4 |
| HBI Racing Kawasaki | Kawasaki | 805 | (United States) Slade Varola | All |
| Kessler Concrete ATeam RevX Yamaha | Yamaha | 92 | (United States) Jace Kessler | 1–2 |
| Progressive Insurances ECSTAR Suzuki | Suzuki | 94 | (Germany) Ken Roczen | 11 |
| Rides Unlimited Rocky Mountain ATV MC Racing | KTM | 108 | (Estonia) Jörgen-Matthias Talviku | 1–9 |
| Rides Unlimited Rocky Mountain ATV MC Racing | KTM | 284 | (United States) Hunter DaSilva | 1–3, 5–7 |
| Rides Unlimited Rocky Mountain ATV MC Racing | KTM | 337 | (South Africa) Slade Smith | All |
| Rides Unlimited Rocky Mountain ATV MC Racing | KTM | 364 | (United States) Chad Saultz | 5–7, 11 |
| Rides Unlimited Rocky Mountain ATV MC Racing | KTM | 435 | (South Africa) Marcus Phelps | 1–4, 6–7, 9–11 |
| Yoothapina Farming/Burton Estate Agents | Kawasaki | 114 | (Australia) Geran Stapleton | 5 |
| Palmer Compound | Triumph | 123 | (United States) Kayden Palmer | 8 |
| Sun Enterprise | Honda | 127 | (United States) Jake Bork | 3 |
| Kobusch Racing | Husqvarna | 135 | (United States) Lance Kobusch | 3, 10–11 |
| Hustle Hard Energy | Gas Gas | 158 | (Mexico) Tre Fierro | 1–2 |
| Host Grindstone Kawasaki | Kawasaki | 162 | (United States) Maxwell Sanford | 1–2, 4–6, 9–10 |
| Host Grindstone Kawasaki | Kawasaki | 425 | (United States) Reven Gordon | 1 |
| Peeweecycle.com/SC3/Asagi | Gas Gas | 168 | (United States) Cale Kuchnicki | 10–11 |
| Tim Hoover | Yamaha | 172 | (United States) Hayden Hoover | 1, 3, 7, 9, 11 |
| Snack Truck | Gas Gas | 179 | (United States) Evan Richard | 4–5, 9, 11 |
| 180Decals | Yamaha | 180 | (United States) Bryar Perry | 7–8 |
| Tech Service/The 606 Factory | Yamaha | 181 | (United States) Ashton Arruda | 4–6, 9–10 |
| Vacendak Construction | Husqvarna | 185 | (United States) Matthew Vacendak | 5, 9 |
| Grateful Ones MC/Roseville Yamaha | Yamaha | 194 | (United States) Derik Denzin | 2 |
| TPJ Fly Racing Team | KTM | 197 | (United States) Brian Saunier | All |
| TPJ Fly Racing Team | Kawasaki | 378 | (United States) Kyle Wise | All |
| TPJ Fly Racing Team | Husqvarna | 420 | (United States) Jackson Gray | 1–2 |
| TPJ Fly Racing Team | Kawasaki | 512 | (United States) Austin Cozadd | 1–2 |
| TPJ Fly Racing Team | KTM | 746 | (United States) Trevor Schmidt | 5–6, 9 |
| ThirtyOne3 Cycles | Yamaha | 203 | (United States) Andrew Boccarossa | 5 |
| DCLLL Suspension/FMF/FXR | Yamaha | 205 | (United States) Tom Albano | 5, 9 |
| EDM Performance | Kawasaki | 208 | (United States) Logan Leitzel | 7 |
| Nuevo Camino Speed Machines | Kawasaki | 211 | (United States) Jason Fichera | 1, 3, 8 |
| Agrarian Farm Management/F1 Genetics | Yamaha | 212 | (United States) Wyatt Fields | 2 |
| Three Seventeen Moto | KTM | 215 | (United States) Jason Neidigh | 4, 6, 9–11 |
| Sun Powersports Racing | KTM | 220 | (United States) Raice Hernandez | 3 |
| Vet MX | Gas Gas | 225 | (United States) Brett Stralo | 1, 3, 8 |
| JMC Motorsports | Gas Gas | 230 | (United States) Dylan Summerlin | 8 |
| | Yamaha | 235 | (United States) Patrick Murphy | 6–7, 10–11 |
| Su7&8 | Suzuki | 238 | (United States) Benji Robinson | 5 |
| ScrubnDirt/FXR/Mech Co | KTM | 239 | (United States) Bryson Raymond | 6, 10–11 |
| O'Neal/Factory Connection/Motorbikes Plus | Husqvarna | 241 | (United States) Cameron Dufault | 4–5 |
| Owen Motorsports/PR2 Racing | Yamaha | 243 | (United States) Brandon Bollino | 6 |
| MJ Racing AJE Motorsports | Gas Gas | 245 | (Denmark) Matti Jørgensen | 1–3, 5–7, 10–11 |
| Immortal Insulation | KTM | 249 | (United States) Bailey Kroone | 3, 6 |
| C&D Truck Equipment | Honda | 251 | (United States) Kyle Czworkowski | 4–5, 10 |
| Chasing the Dream | Honda | 253 | (United States) Nick Jones | 1 |
| Cook Construction | KTM | 254 | (United States) Cole Cook | 2, 8 |
| Double Down Heavy Equipment Repair | Yamaha | 263 | (United States) Talon Schwall | 1–3, 6, 8 |
| Big 4 Motorsports | Honda | 264 | (United States) Ben Blakely | 1 |
| Honda of the Ozarks | Honda | 266 | (United States) Brett Greenley | 4, 6–7, 10–11 |
| Fredericktown Yamaha | Yamaha | 268 | (United States) Gage Stine | 6, 10–11 |
| WestEnd/Roseville Motorsports | Yamaha | 270 | (United States) Bryson Olson | 1–2 |
| SBR/Vertical Tank | KTM | 273 | (United States) Brock Bennett | All |
| Grindstone | Husqvarna | 276 | (United States) Jaret Finch | 1–2 |
| EKS Brand/Fly Racing/All Balls Racing Group | Yamaha | 277 | (United States) Lucas Padrutt | 3, 11 |
| Purvines Yamaha Simi Valley Cycles | Yamaha | 279 | (United States) Wyatt Mattson | 2 |
| FXR/RM Army Suzuki | Suzuki | 281 | (United States) Cory Carsten | 4, 9–10 |
| Bon Air Exteriors | Yamaha | 283 | (United States) Aidan Dickens | 6, 10–11 |
| Donahues Supersports | Yamaha | 285 | (United States) Luke Van Lyssel | 7–8, 11 |
| Adventure Moto KTM | KTM | 286 | (United States) Grayson Fair | 11 |
| Crestview Construction/Montys Motosport | Gas Gas | 294 | (United States) Nick McDonnell | 5 |
| Floyd Racing | Honda | 296 | (United States) Ryder Floyd | 10–11 |
| US27 Motorsports/Sofa Brand MX | Honda | 299 | (United States) Konnor Visger | All |
| SLR Honda | Honda | 302 | (United States) Parker Ross | 9–11 |
| SLR Honda | Honda | 736 | (United States) Jace Allred | 9–11 |
| Vickery Motosports | Yamaha | 306 | (United States) Damon Strobel | 3 |
| 3Bros Hatch Racing | Husqvarna | 310 | (United States) Kai Aiello | 3, 8 |
| VPE Racing | Yamaha | 313 | (United States) Ronnie Snyder | 4, 9 |
| Steelhorse Ministries/MPS Enterprises | KTM | 316 | (United States) Ty Freehill | 1–3 |
| | Yamaha | 318 | (United States) Seth Crotty | 8 |
| SC Sporthomes Husqvarna | Husqvarna | 322 | (United Kingdom) Charlie Heyman | 9–11 |
| Gibson Racing | KTM | 328 | (United States) Brayden Gibson | 4–7, 9–11 |
| TAGMX | Triumph | 342 | (United States) Cory Broyles | 6, 9–10 |
| The Functional Neurology Center | Kawasaki | 343 | (United States) Carter Biese | 4, 6–7, 9, 11 |
| Heat Wave Visual/ARACOM Racing | Husqvarna | 344 | (United States) Justin Aragaki | 1–2, 8 |
| | Gas Gas | 346 | (United States) Charles Tolleson | 9–11 |
| Militia Dirt Worx | Husqvarna | 350 | (United States) Chandler Baker | 8–11 |
| 808 Enterprises/Fiv11/Motofab | KTM | 353 | (United States) Brodie Bennett | 6, 11 |
| Mobile X FirePower Honda | Honda | 359 | (Australia) Jake Cannon | 6 |
| Smedley's Chevrolet | Honda | 362 | (United States) Braden Gray | 4, 11 |
| IDD | KTM | 363 | (United States) Taylor Beckwith | 5–7, 9–11 |
| 110 Racing/AP Contracting | Yamaha | 366 | (United States) Blaze Cremaldi | 9 |
| Morgantown Powersports | Yamaha | 367 | (United States) Christian McCauley | 4, 9–11 |
| Rob's Performance/Samax Products | Husqvarna | 368 | (United States) May Mayer | 6, 10–11 |
| Kaplan Cycles | KTM | 375 | (United States) Larry Fortin | 4–6, 9 |
| O'Neal Racing/Pro Circuit/Dirt Tricks | KTM | 376 | (United States) Thomas Welch | 1–3 |
| J&H Custom Construction | KTM | 377 | (United States) Austin Black | 8 |
| STP Trucking/Championship Powersports | Gas Gas | 391 | (United States) R.J Schroyer | 4, 6 |
| Pawel Maslak Racing | Honda | 392 | (United States) Pawel Maslak | 5, 9 |
| Gizmo Mods Rock River Yamaha Racing | Yamaha | 401 | (United States) Blake Gardner | 1–10 |
| Gizmo Mods Rock River Yamaha Racing | Yamaha | 413 | (United States) Crockett Myers | 1–8 |
| Gizmo Mods Rock River Yamaha Racing | Yamaha | 900 | (United States) Keegan Rowley | 1–7, 10–11 |
| Wildcat Race Team | Gas Gas | 404 | (France) Tom Guyon | 5–6 |
| Wildcat Race Team | Gas Gas | 751 | (United States) Evan Ferry | All |
| Fort Collins Motorsports | Yamaha | 405 | (United States) Tyler Aldor | 3 |
| Walker Racing | KTM | 406 | (United States) Jake Walker | 5 |
| Championship Powerspoerts | Honda | 422 | (United States) Steven Keil | 4, 6, 11 |
| Factory Connection/Hinson Clutch/Bills Pipes | Yamaha | 432 | (United States) Sal Colangelo | 4–6, 10 |
| MX101 FXR Yamaha | Yamaha | 434 | (Canada) Austin Jones | 10–11 |
| MX101 FXR Yamaha | Yamaha | 612 | (Canada) Sebastien Racine | 10–11 |
| HOP Racing | Yamaha | 440 | (United States) Austin Kapoukranidis | 9 |
| Big St Charles | KTM | 441 | (United States) Zayden Mason | 4–6, 11 |
| Bar Aviation/Extreme Adventure Park | Kawasaki | 451 | (South Africa) Dalton Venter | 3–11 |
| Bar Aviation/Extreme Adventure Park | Kawasaki | 565 | (Uganda) Stav Orland | All |
| Genden Auto Parts/Team Justice Racing | KTM | 459 | (United States) Austin Brooks | 5, 9 |
| Lafrance Hospitality/Granite State Contract Furnishings | Yamaha | 460 | (United States) Grant Lafrance | 5 |
| Excel Concrete/Steel Ridge Detailing | KTM | 462 | (United States) Skyler Adams | 8 |
| US27 Motorsports | Kawasaki | 470 | (United States) Ethan Day | 1–3, 7–11 |
| | KTM | 474 | (United States) Tucker Nelson | 7 |
| Motorbikes Plus/Factory Connection | KTM | 478 | (United States) Trevor Pelotte | 5 |
| Life of a Privateer | Triumph | 483 | (United States) Bryton Carroll | 10 |
| Maple Ridge Motorsports/BCL Construction | Kawasaki | 485 | (Canada) Devyn Smith | 10–11 |
| Randanella Septic Inc | KTM | 488 | (United States) Travis Randanella | 4–5, 10 |
| Randanella Septic Inc | Kawasaki | 489 | (United States) Ricci Randanella | 4, 10 |
| FXR/Factory Connection/Capitol Cycle | Gas Gas | 490 | (United States) Ragan Cochran | 1–3 |
| Xtreme Motorworks | Gas Gas | 492 | (United States) Matthew Wilson | 8 |
| Humboldt Motorsports | Kawasaki | 497 | (United States) Josh Lee | 1–2, 8 |
| Team Green Kawasaki | Kawasaki | 505 | (United States) Nick Peccarelli | 4–7, 9 |
| Reprieve Recovery Center | Husqvarna | 506 | (United States) Andrew Wallace | 4, 6 |
| Privateer Paddock | Husqvarna | 508 | (United States) Jesse Wessell | 4–5 |
| Mentom Payments/Rockwell/SKVI | Honda | 509 | (United States) Alex Nagy | 7 |
| Tim Roth | Honda | 514 | (United States) Anthony Roth | 3 |
| Team 524 | KTM | 524 | (United States) Ty Lepicier | 9–10 |
| Hammer Church | Yamaha | 527 | (United States) Matt Hammer | 5 |
| BMC Racing/Victorico's Mexican Food | KTM | 532 | (United States) Chase Reid | 8 |
| Feine Tune Motorsports | KTM | 536 | (United States) Gavin Tilford | 3–4, 6–7, 10–11 |
| Waxed Racing | Husqvarna | 537 | (United States) Travis Mecking | 4–5, 8–10 |
| Procaliber/Legacy Racewear/Flow Vision | Kawasaki | 540 | (United States) Preston Wittkopp | All |
| Shirt Racing | Yamaha | 544 | (United States) Noah Willbrandt | 6 |
| Troll Training/180Decals | Gas Gas | 548 | (United States) Brandon Espe | 7 |
| Owen Bills Racing | Yamaha | 553 | (United States) Owen Bills | 2, 8 |
| Motorbikes+/Crow Hill/Rynopower | Husqvarna | 560 | (United States) Kyle Murdoch | 5 |
| NPR 4 Autism | KTM | 583 | (United States) Brady Neys | 11 |
| KTM South Africa | KTM | 584 | (South Africa) Cameron Durow | 1–3, 5–11 |
| Race Tech | Kawasaki | 588 | (United States) Eddie Norred | 5 |
| Hydraulic Solutions Fire Protection | KTM | 605 | (United States) Blake Broderick | 4–5, 9–10 |
| Cooper Racing | Honda | 609 | (United States) Cory Cooper | 10 |
| MXTire/110 Racing/DirtLab Concepts | Husqvarna | 620 | (United States) Peyton Jackson | 4, 6, 9–11 |
| Kawasaki Team Green KB5 | Kawasaki | 625 | (United States) Patrick Coreno | 5 |
| Motorbikes Plus/Alias MX | KTM | 629 | (United States) Jake Varney | 5 |
| Factory Connection | KTM | 640 | (United States) Aaron Zielfelder | 5 |
| Triangle Cycles/MX Tire/FXR | Yamaha | 642 | (United States) Hamden Hudson | 6, 10 |
| Williams Motowerx | Yamaha | 646 | (United States) Elijah Tetzlaff | 3–4, 6–7, 11 |
| Kris Kowalsky Racing | Honda | 651 | (United States) Jeremy Kowalsky | 7 |
| Louds Racing | KTM | 655 | (United States) Tyler Loud | 5, 9–10 |
| White Distributors/EHR/Factory Connection | KTM | 659 | (United States) Alex White | 5 |
| GFR | Honda | 662 | (United States) Dean Gall | 6–7, 9 |
| 631MX/Waxed Racing | Husqvarna | 664 | (United States) Hunter Stempel | 5 |
| Pocatello PowerSports/Fasst Company | Honda | 670 | (United States) Gavin Brough | 1–3, 6–8, 10–11 |
| Team Sakai Racing | Yamaha | 690 | (United States) Michael McLing | 6, 11 |
| Powerband/Rolling Designs | Yamaha | 699 | (United States) Domenic Hegman | 6–8, 11 |
| | KTM | 701 | (United States) Kyle Kunstman | 4, 6–7, 11 |
| MX23/Aggressive Graphics | KTM | 712 | (United States) Sam St Laurent | 5 |
| FDR Motorsports | Honda | 720 | (United States) Jordon Fancher | 6 |
| Kibuk Cycles | Suzuki | 722 | (United States) Josh Carson | 4, 6, 9–11 |
| MX Locker/Steelkorr | Husqvarna | 734 | (United States) Dayton Briggs | 8 |
| Outdoor Motorsports/RPM's Apparel | Honda | 741 | (United States) Spencer Mang | 9 |
| New Hampshire Motocross | Yamaha | 778 | (United States) Tony Lorusso | 5 |
| Forsberg Racing | Yamaha | 779 | (United States) Chase Forsberg | 2 |
| Reinke Racing | Yamaha | 799 | (United States) Alex Reinke | 6–7, 11 |
| Phase Moto/Factory Connection/Acerbis USA | Yamaha | 809 | (United States) Brayden Ehlermann | 4–6, 9–11 |
| Rosenau Powersports | Suzuki | 811 | (United States) Chris Williams | 4–6, 11 |
| Popeyes Paving | Husqvarna | 817 | (United States) Max Darling | 1–6 |
| Pure Adrenaline/Let's Ride/Pocatello TMX | Yamaha | 835 | (United States) Conner Lords | 6–8 |
| ONeil Racing | Kawasaki | 845 | (United States) Bryan O'Neil | 8 |
| JB Electric | Yamaha | 866 | (United States) Ashton Bloxom | All |
| Dieselwerx/rdrco/viral | Yamaha | 894 | (United States) Luke Bierek | 1–2, 8 |
| 3D Racing/KTM | KTM | 914 | (United States) Russell Buccheri | 4–6, 9–11 |
| Hulsey Racing/Midwest Sports Center | Kawasaki | 924 | (United States) Gage Hulsey | All |
| Sassy Balls | Yamaha | 933 | (United States) Dylan Moriarty | 9 |
| MXA/SteelKorr/Pasha Racing | Suzuki | 934 | (United States) Brian Medeiros | 1–2, 8 |
| Alias MX | KTM | 935 | (United States) Eric Grondahl | 5, 9 |
| Storm Lake Honda | Honda | 942 | (United States) Deegan Hepp | 3, 7 |
| Fasthouse/Jones Excavating | Yamaha | 946 | (United States) Cole Jones | 4, 10 |
| M.P. Langan General Contractor | Yamaha | 967 | (United States) Ryan Langan | 5 |
| Vickery Motorsports/Fitch Racing Suspension | Yamaha | 970 | (United States) Kyle DeRoche | 3 |
| Triple JJJ Services | KTM | 999 | (United States) Jesse Jacobsen | 3–4, 6–7 |

=== Riders Championship ===
| Pos | Rider | Bike | FOX (California) | | HAN (California) | | THU (Colorado) | | HIG (Pennsylvania) | | SOU (Massachusetts) | | RED (Michigan) | | SPR (Minnesota) | | WAS (Washington (state)) | | UNA (New York (state)) | | BUD (Maryland) | | IRN (Indiana) | | Points |
|---|---|---|---|---|---|---|---|---|---|---|---|---|---|---|---|---|---|---|---|---|---|---|---|---|---|
| 1 | (United States) Haiden Deegan | Yamaha | 1 | 1 | 1 | 2 | 1 | 2 | 1 | 2 | 1 | 2 | 2 | 6 | 3 | 4 | 2 | 1 | 1 | 2 | 1 | 10 | 11 | 1 | 481 |
| 2 | (France) Tom Vialle | KTM | 4 | 3 | 4 | 1 | 2 | 4 | 8 | 4 | 2 | 3 | 3 | 4 | 2 | 17 | 1 | 2 | 22 | 3 | 2 | 3 | 1 | 4 | 412 |
| 3 | (United States) Levi Kitchen | Kawasaki | 2 | 2 | 3 | 3 | 3 | 7 | 10 | 9 | 4 | 7 | 6 | 3 | 1 | 1 | 12 | 4 | 2 | 1 | 3 | 1 | 2 | Ret | 405 |
| 4 | (United States) Chance Hymas | Honda | 3 | 4 | 2 | 4 | 4 | 1 | 4 | 3 | 3 | 5 | 4 | 1 | 5 | Ret | 8 | 12 | 32 | Ret | 8 | 2 | 6 | 2 | 349 |
| 5 | (United States) Ty Masterpool | Kawasaki | 24 | 10 | 6 | 11 | 8 | 6 | 2 | 1 | 6 | 8 | 1 | 5 | 8 | 10 | 10 | 15 | 9 | 9 | 11 | 9 | 5 | 6 | 316 |
| 6 | (Japan) Jo Shimoda | Honda | 8 | 6 | 7 | 5 | 5 | 3 | 3 | 5 | 9 | 1 | 5 | 2 | 4 | Ret | 3 | 3 | 4 | Ret | | | | | 289 |
| 7 | (United States) Jalek Swoll | Triumph | 6 | 5 | 8 | 8 | 7 | 5 | 7 | 14 | Ret | 14 | 8 | Ret | 11 | 12 | 7 | 9 | 6 | 4 | 6 | 4 | 12 | 10 | 277 |
| 8 | (United States) Pierce Brown | Gas Gas | 10 | 8 | 5 | 10 | 6 | 9 | 13 | 6 | 8 | 12 | 10 | Ret | 13 | 14 | 6 | 5 | 7 | 7 | 7 | 5 | 10 | Ret | 269 |
| 9 | (United States) Jordon Smith | Yamaha | 7 | 18 | Ret | 6 | 11 | 11 | 9 | 10 | 7 | 4 | Ret | 10 | 6 | 13 | 11 | 17 | 12 | 6 | 10 | 6 | 3 | 8 | 253 |
| 10 | (United States) Ryder DiFrancesco | Gas Gas | 9 | 12 | 14 | 18 | 18 | 14 | 5 | 13 | 10 | 11 | 13 | 7 | 12 | 5 | 4 | 6 | 10 | 11 | 13 | 17 | 7 | 5 | 250 |
| 11 | (United States) Julien Beaumer | KTM | 13 | 9 | 9 | 9 | 9 | 10 | 6 | 8 | 18 | Ret | | | 15 | 8 | 16 | 8 | 8 | 10 | 4 | 7 | 8 | Ret | 221 |
| 12 | (United States) Joey Savatgy | Triumph | 5 | 13 | Ret | 7 | 17 | 8 | 19 | 7 | 5 | 6 | Ret | DNS | 29 | 9 | 9 | 7 | Ret | 12 | 5 | Ret | Ret | 9 | 192 |
| 13 | (United States) Casey Cochran | Husqvarna | 15 | 21 | 12 | 12 | 16 | 16 | Ret | 11 | 11 | 10 | 7 | 9 | 9 | 2 | 15 | 13 | 11 | Ret | | | | | 164 |
| 14 | (United States) Dilan Schwartz | Suzuki | 12 | 15 | 15 | 19 | 10 | 18 | 11 | 15 | 21 | 17 | 14 | 16 | 10 | 6 | 17 | 11 | 14 | Ret | Ret | 18 | 14 | 16 | 151 |
| 15 | (United Kingdom) Max Anstie | Yamaha | | | | | | | | | Ret | 9 | 9 | 13 | 7 | 3 | 5 | Ret | 3 | 8 | Ret | DNS | 13 | 7 | 145 |
| 16 | (United States) Nick Romano | Yamaha | 18 | Ret | 17 | 16 | 12 | 12 | 12 | 16 | 17 | 20 | 12 | 14 | Ret | 15 | 18 | 14 | 13 | 14 | 12 | 12 | 17 | 14 | 145 |
| 17 | (United States) Daxton Bennick | Yamaha | 20 | 14 | 11 | 15 | 15 | 17 | 18 | 26 | 13 | 15 | 16 | 8 | Ret | 7 | 25 | 22 | 15 | 13 | 17 | 14 | DNS | DNS | 124 |
| 18 | (United States) Jett Reynolds | Yamaha | 16 | 16 | 27 | 17 | 20 | 19 | 17 | 18 | 12 | Ret | 15 | 11 | 14 | 11 | 13 | 10 | | | | | | | 99 |
| 19 | (United States) Talon Hawkins | KTM | 35 | 20 | 16 | 25 | 19 | 21 | 21 | 19 | 15 | 16 | 17 | 17 | 16 | 20 | 14 | 24 | 18 | 17 | 15 | 15 | 18 | 15 | 89 |
| 20 | (United States) Coty Schock | Yamaha | 19 | 17 | 13 | 24 | 14 | 13 | 14 | 12 | | | | | | | | | 16 | 18 | 14 | 13 | Ret | 13 | 88 |
| 21 | (United States) Mark Fineis | Yamaha | 14 | 11 | Ret | 13 | 32 | 15 | 16 | Ret | 14 | Ret | 11 | 12 | DNS | DNS | 19 | 18 | 30 | 26 | 35 | Ret | 20 | 18 | 83 |
| 22 | (United States) RJ Hampshire | Husqvarna | | | | | | | | | | | | | | | | | | | 9 | 8 | 4 | 3 | 65 |
| 23 | (United States) Garrett Marchbanks | Kawasaki | | | | | | | | | | | | | | | | | 5 | 5 | 16 | 11 | Ret | DNS | 51 |
| 24 | (United States) Lux Turner | KTM | 17 | 35 | Ret | 29 | 27 | 20 | 24 | 23 | Ret | 18 | 18 | 19 | 19 | 18 | Ret | 20 | 17 | 16 | 18 | 20 | 25 | 19 | 47 |
| 25 | (United States) Nate Thrasher | Yamaha | 11 | 7 | 10 | 14 | | | | | | | | | | | | | | | | | | | 46 |
| 26 | (Canada) Ryder McNabb | KTM | 36 | 19 | 19 | 21 | 13 | 23 | 15 | 17 | 16 | 19 | | | | | | | | | | | | | 37 |
| 27 | (Germany) Ken Roczen | Suzuki | | | | | | | | | | | | | | | | | | | | | 9 | 12 | 23 |
| 28 | (Estonia) Jörgen-Matthias Talviku | KTM | Ret | 31 | 22 | Ret | 25 | 27 | 23 | 20 | 23 | 13 | 23 | 21 | 17 | 19 | 21 | 16 | Ret | DNS | | | | | 22 |
| 29 | (United States) Drew Adams | Kawasaki | | | | | | | | | | | | | | | | | | | | | 15 | 11 | 18 |
| 30 | (United States) Brock Bennett | KTM | 21 | 25 | 18 | 20 | 28 | 31 | DNQ | DNQ | DNQ | DNQ | 25 | Ret | Ret | 22 | 23 | 21 | 20 | 19 | 31 | 19 | 26 | 20 | 18 |
| 31 | (United States) Chandler Baker | Husqvarna | | | | | | | | | | | | | | | 20 | Ret | Ret | 15 | 19 | 31 | Ret | 17 | 17 |
| 32 | (United States) Parker Ross | Honda | | | | | | | | | | | | | | | | | 26 | 20 | 21 | 16 | 16 | Ret | 15 |
| 33 | (United States) Crockett Myers | Yamaha | 27 | 30 | 26 | 27 | 21 | 26 | 20 | Ret | 19 | 21 | 20 | 22 | 18 | Ret | Ret | Ret | | | | | | | 13 |
| 34 | (United States) Blake Gardner | Yamaha | DNQ | DNQ | Ret | 26 | 23 | 25 | DNQ | DNQ | DNQ | DNQ | Ret | 33 | 24 | 16 | 22 | Ret | 36 | 21 | 20 | 22 | | | 9 |
| 35 | (South Africa) Marcus Phelps | KTM | Ret | 36 | 20 | Ret | 22 | 22 | Ret | DNS | | | 19 | 27 | 23 | 24 | | | 19 | 32 | 27 | 24 | 31 | DNS | 8 |
| 36 | (France) Tom Guyon | Gas Gas | | | | | | | | | 22 | Ret | 22 | 15 | | | | | | | | | | | 7 |
| 37 | (United States) Evan Ferry | Gas Gas | 32 | 37 | 29 | DNS | 39 | 24 | DNQ | DNQ | 24 | 22 | 21 | 20 | 20 | Ret | 30 | Ret | 23 | Ret | Ret | Ret | Ret | 23 | 5 |
| 38 | (Australia) Jake Cannon | Honda | | | | | | | | | | | 31 | 18 | | | | | | | | | | | 4 |
| 39 | (South Africa) Slade Smith | KTM | 31 | 26 | 24 | 22 | 38 | Ret | Ret | 24 | DNQ | DNQ | DNQ | DNQ | 21 | 27 | 26 | 19 | DNQ | DNQ | 32 | 23 | DNQ | DNQ | 4 |
| 40 | (United States) Trevin Nelson | Yamaha | | | | | | | | | | | | | | | | | | | DNQ | DNQ | 19 | 29 | 3 |
| 41 | (United States) Russell Buccheri | KTM | | | | | | | 30 | 33 | 20 | 29 | DNQ | DNQ | | | | | DNQ | DNQ | DNQ | DNQ | DNQ | 27 | 2 |
| 42 | (Uganda) Stav Orland | Kawasaki | DNQ | DNQ | Ret | 32 | 29 | 39 | DNQ | 22 | DNQ | DNQ | 28 | 23 | 26 | 21 | Ret | 30 | 25 | 22 | 23 | Ret | 24 | Ret | 1 |
| 43 | (Denmark) Matti Jørgensen | Gas Gas | DNQ | DNQ | 28 | 28 | DNQ | DNQ | | | DNQ | DNQ | 27 | 25 | 22 | 26 | | | | | 22 | 21 | DNQ | DNQ | 1 |
| 44 | (United States) Maxwell Sanford | Kawasaki | 34 | 28 | 30 | 31 | | | 22 | 21 | 30 | Ret | 24 | Ret | | | | | 37 | 28 | 26 | Ret | | | 1 |
| 45 | (United States) Lance Kobusch | Husqvarna | | | | | DNS | DNS | | | | | | | | | | | | | 34 | Ret | 22 | 21 | 1 |
| 46 | (United States) Kyle Wise | Kawasaki | 30 | 27 | DNQ | DNQ | Ret | 28 | DNQ | DNQ | DNQ | DNQ | 33 | 24 | DNQ | DNQ | 35 | 23 | 34 | 24 | 25 | Ret | 21 | 24 | 1 |
| 47 | (United Kingdom) Charlie Heyman | Husqvarna | | | | | | | | | | | | | | | | | 21 | 25 | Ret | DNS | DNQ | DNQ | 1 |
| 48 | (United States) Joshua Varize | KTM | | | 21 | Ret | | | | | | | | | | | | | | | | | | | 1 |
| | (United States) Preston Boespflug | Suzuki | 22 | 22 | Ret | DNS | | | | | | | | | | | 24 | DNS | DNQ | 23 | 24 | 32 | DNQ | Ret | 0 |
| | (Canada) Sebastien Racine | Yamaha | | | | | | | | | | | | | | | | | | | DNQ | DNQ | Ret | 22 | 0 |
| | (South Africa) Cameron Durow | KTM | 26 | 34 | 25 | 23 | 31 | 30 | | | Ret | 27 | DNQ | 28 | 25 | 25 | 27 | 27 | 28 | 31 | 30 | 25 | 23 | 25 | 0 |
| | (United States) C.J. Benard | KTM | 23 | 23 | | | | | | | | | | | | | | | | | | | | | 0 |
| | (United States) Slade Varola | Kawasaki | 33 | 33 | Ret | 35 | 35 | 37 | 29 | 30 | Ret | 30 | 26 | Ret | Ret | 23 | 33 | 26 | 27 | 30 | 29 | 29 | 29 | DNS | 0 |
| | (United States) Kyle Murdoch | Husqvarna | | | | | | | | | 26 | 23 | | | | | | | | | | | | | 0 |
| | (United States) Wyatt Mattson | Yamaha | | | 23 | 30 | | | | | | | | | | | | | | | | | | | 0 |
| | (South Africa) Dalton Venter | Kawasaki | | | | | 24 | 34 | 26 | 28 | DNQ | DNQ | 30 | 29 | Ret | 31 | 31 | 25 | 33 | Ret | 28 | Ret | 28 | Ret | 0 |
| | (Australia) Geran Stapleton | Kawasaki | | | | | | | | | 25 | 24 | | | | | | | | | | | | | 0 |
| | (Chile) Hardy Muñoz | Kawasaki | Ret | 24 | Ret | DNS | 26 | 29 | DNQ | DNQ | | | | | | | | | | | | | | | 0 |
| | (United States) Jace Allred | Honda | | | | | | | | | | | | | | | | | 24 | 29 | DNQ | 30 | DNQ | DNQ | 0 |
| | (United States) Cory Carsten | Suzuki | | | | | | | 25 | 25 | | | | | | | | | DNQ | DNQ | DNQ | DNQ | | | 0 |
| | (United States) Eric Grondahl | KTM | | | | | | | | | 27 | 25 | | | | | | | DNQ | DNQ | | | | | 0 |
| | (France) Anthony Bourdon | Suzuki | 25 | Ret | | | | | | | | | | | | | | | | | | | | | 0 |
| | (United States) Ashton Arruda | Yamaha | | | | | | | 28 | DNS | 28 | 26 | DNQ | DNQ | | | | | 29 | 27 | DNQ | DNQ | | | 0 |
| | (United States) Gage Stine | Yamaha | | | | | | | | | | | 29 | 26 | | | | | | | DNQ | DNQ | Ret | DNS | 0 |
| | (United States) Patrick Murphy | Yamaha | | | | | | | | | | | Ret | DNS | DNQ | DNQ | | | | | DNQ | DNQ | 30 | 26 | 0 |
| | (United States) Ryder Floyd | Honda | | | | | | | | | | | | | | | | | | | 33 | 26 | Ret | DNS | 0 |
| | (United States) Jesse Wessell | Husqvarna | | | | | | | 27 | 27 | 32 | Ret | | | | | | | | | | | | | 0 |
| | (United States) Gavin Brough | Honda | 29 | 32 | DNQ | 33 | 34 | 35 | | | | | DNQ | DNQ | 27 | 29 | 28 | 32 | | | DNQ | DNQ | DNQ | 28 | 0 |
| | (United States) Leo Tucker | Suzuki | DNQ | DNQ | DNQ | Ret | DNQ | DNQ | | | DNQ | DNQ | 32 | 30 | Ret | 30 | | | DNQ | DNQ | 36 | 27 | DNQ | Ret | 0 |
| | (United States) Carter Biese | Kawasaki | | | | | | | 32 | 32 | | | DNQ | DNQ | 30 | Ret | | | 35 | Ret | | | 27 | Ret | 0 |
| | (United States) Reven Gordon | Kawasaki | 28 | 29 | | | | | | | | | | | | | | | | | | | | | 0 |
| | (United States) Ricci Randanella | Kawasaki | | | | | | | 31 | 31 | | | | | | | | | | | DNQ | 28 | | | 0 |
| | (United States) Jesse Jacobsen | KTM | | | | | 33 | 38 | DNQ | DNQ | | | DNQ | 32 | 28 | Ret | | | | | | | | | 0 |
| | (United States) Austin Black | KTM | | | | | | | | | | | | | | | 32 | 28 | | | | | | | 0 |
| | (United States) Aaron Zielfelder | KTM | | | | | | | | | 33 | 28 | | | | | | | | | | | | | 0 |
| | (United States) Logan Leitzel | Kawasaki | | | | | | | | | | | | | 33 | 28 | | | | | | | | | 0 |
| | (United States) Kai Aiello | Husqvarna | | | | | 30 | 32 | | | | | | | | | 29 | 29 | | | | | | | 0 |
| | (United States) Peyton Jackson | Husqvarna | | | | | | | 35 | 29 | | | DNQ | DNQ | | | | | DNQ | DNQ | DNQ | DNQ | DNQ | DNQ | 0 |
| | (United States) Grant Lafrance | Yamaha | | | | | | | | | 29 | Ret | | | | | | | | | | | | | 0 |
| | (United States) Ashton Bloxom | Yamaha | 37 | 38 | DNQ | DNQ | DNQ | DNQ | DNQ | DNQ | DNQ | DNQ | DNQ | DNQ | 31 | 32 | DNQ | DNQ | DNQ | DNQ | DNQ | DNQ | DNQ | DNQ | 0 |
| | (United States) Larry Fortin | KTM | | | | | | | 33 | 36 | 31 | Ret | DNQ | DNQ | | | | | DNQ | DNQ | | | | | 0 |
| | (United States) Trevor Schmidt | KTM | | | | | | | | | 34 | Ret | DNQ | DNQ | | | | | 31 | Ret | | | | | 0 |
| | (United States) Konnor Visger | Honda | DNQ | DNQ | DNQ | DNQ | DNQ | DNQ | DNQ | 35 | DNQ | DNQ | DNQ | DNQ | DNQ | DNQ | DNQ | 31 | DNQ | DNQ | DNQ | DNQ | DNQ | DNQ | 0 |
| | (United States) Zayden Mason | KTM | | | | | | | DNQ | DNQ | 35 | 31 | DNQ | DNQ | | | | | | | | | DNQ | DNQ | 0 |
| | (United States) Thomas Welch | KTM | DNQ | DNQ | 31 | 36 | 37 | 36 | | | | | | | | | | | | | | | | | 0 |
| | (United States) Aidan Dickens | Yamaha | | | | | | | | | | | DNQ | 31 | | | | | | | DNQ | DNQ | Ret | DNS | 0 |
| | (United States) Keegan Rowley | Yamaha | DNQ | DNQ | DNQ | DNQ | DNQ | DNQ | DNQ | DNQ | DNQ | DNQ | DNQ | DNQ | 32 | 33 | | | | | DNQ | DNQ | DNQ | DNQ | 0 |
| | (United States) Travis Mecking | Husqvarna | | | | | | | 36 | 34 | DNQ | DNQ | | | | | 36 | 33 | DNQ | DNQ | DNQ | DNQ | | | 0 |
| | (United States) Bailey Kroone | KTM | | | | | 36 | 33 | | | | | Ret | Ret | | | | | | | | | | | 0 |
| | (United States) R.J Schroyer | Gas Gas | | | | | | | 34 | Ret | | | Ret | DNS | | | | | | | | | | | 0 |
| | (United States) Chad Saultz | KTM | | | | | | | | | DNQ | DNQ | DNQ | DNQ | 34 | Ret | | | | | | | DNQ | DNQ | 0 |
| | (United States) Dayton Briggs | Husqvarna | | | | | | | | | | | | | | | 34 | Ret | | | | | | | 0 |
| | (Mexico) Tre Fierro | Gas Gas | DNQ | DNQ | DNQ | 34 | | | | | | | | | | | | | | | | | | | 0 |
| | (United States) Kayden Palmer | Triumph | | | | | | | | | | | | | | | 37 | Ret | | | | | | | 0 |
| | (United States) Brett Greenley | Honda | | | | | | | DNQ | 37 | | | DNQ | DNQ | DNQ | DNQ | | | | | DNQ | DNQ | DNQ | DNQ | 0 |
| | (United States) Hamden Hudson | Yamaha | | | | | | | | | | | Ret | Ret | | | | | | | DNQ | DNQ | | | 0 |
| | (United States) Blake Broderick | KTM | | | | | | | Ret | DNS | DNQ | DNQ | | | | | | | DNQ | DNQ | DNQ | DNQ | | | 0 |
| | (United States) Bryson Raymond | KTM | | | | | | | | | | | DNQ | DNQ | | | | | | | DNQ | DNQ | DNQ | Ret | 0 |
| | (United States) Preston Wittkopp | Kawasaki | DNQ | DNQ | DNQ | DNQ | DNQ | DNQ | DNQ | DNQ | DNQ | DNQ | DNQ | DNQ | DNQ | DNQ | DNQ | DNQ | DNQ | DNQ | DNQ | DNQ | DNQ | DNQ | 0 |
| | (United States) Gage Hulsey | Kawasaki | DNQ | DNQ | DNQ | DNQ | DNQ | DNQ | DNQ | DNQ | DNQ | DNQ | DNQ | DNQ | DNQ | DNQ | DNQ | DNQ | DNQ | DNQ | DNQ | DNQ | DNQ | DNQ | 0 |
| | (United States) Brian Saunier | KTM | DNQ | DNQ | DNQ | DNQ | DNQ | DNQ | DNQ | DNQ | DNQ | DNQ | DNQ | DNQ | DNQ | DNQ | DNQ | DNQ | DNQ | DNQ | DNQ | DNQ | DNQ | DNQ | 0 |
| | (United States) Ethan Day | Kawasaki | DNQ | DNQ | DNQ | DNQ | DNQ | DNQ | | | | | | | DNQ | DNQ | DNQ | DNQ | DNQ | DNQ | DNQ | DNQ | DNQ | DNQ | 0 |
| | (United States) Brayden Gibson | KTM | | | | | | | DNQ | DNQ | DNQ | DNQ | DNQ | DNQ | DNQ | DNQ | | | DNQ | DNQ | DNQ | DNQ | DNQ | DNQ | 0 |
| | (United States) Max Darling | Husqvarna | DNQ | DNQ | DNQ | DNQ | DNQ | DNQ | DNQ | DNQ | DNQ | DNQ | DNQ | DNQ | | | | | | | | | | | 0 |
| | (United States) Hunter DaSilva | KTM | DNQ | DNQ | DNQ | DNQ | DNQ | DNQ | | | DNQ | DNQ | DNQ | DNQ | DNQ | DNQ | | | | | | | | | 0 |
| | (United States) Gavin Tilford | KTM | | | | | DNQ | DNQ | DNQ | DNQ | | | DNQ | DNQ | DNQ | DNQ | | | | | DNQ | DNQ | DNQ | DNQ | 0 |
| | (United States) Brayden Ehlermann | Yamaha | | | | | | | DNQ | DNQ | DNQ | DNQ | DNQ | DNQ | | | | | DNQ | DNQ | DNQ | DNQ | DNQ | DNQ | 0 |
| | (United States) Taylor Beckwith | KTM | | | | | | | | | DNQ | DNQ | DNQ | DNQ | DNQ | DNQ | | | DNQ | DNQ | DNQ | DNQ | DNQ | DNQ | 0 |
| | (United States) Talon Schwall | Yamaha | DNQ | DNQ | DNQ | DNQ | DNQ | DNQ | | | | | DNQ | DNQ | | | DNQ | DNQ | | | | | | | 0 |
| | (United States) Hayden Hoover | Yamaha | DNQ | DNQ | | | DNQ | DNQ | | | | | | | DNQ | DNQ | | | DNQ | DNQ | | | DNQ | DNQ | 0 |
| | (United States) Elijah Tetzlaff | Yamaha | | | | | DNQ | DNQ | DNQ | DNQ | | | DNQ | DNQ | DNQ | DNQ | | | | | | | DNQ | DNQ | 0 |
| | (United States) Nick Peccarelli | Kawasaki | | | | | | | DNQ | DNQ | DNQ | DNQ | DNQ | DNQ | DNQ | DNQ | | | DNQ | DNQ | | | | | 0 |
| | (United States) Jason Neidigh | KTM | | | | | | | DNQ | DNQ | | | DNQ | DNQ | | | | | DNQ | DNQ | DNQ | DNQ | DNQ | DNQ | 0 |
| | (United States) Josh Carson | Suzuki | | | | | | | DNQ | DNQ | | | DNQ | DNQ | | | | | DNQ | DNQ | DNQ | DNQ | DNQ | DNQ | 0 |
| | (United States) Sal Colangelo | Yamaha | | | | | | | DNQ | DNQ | DNQ | DNQ | DNQ | DNQ | | | | | | | DNQ | DNQ | | | 0 |
| | (United States) Chris Williams | Suzuki | | | | | | | DNQ | DNQ | DNQ | DNQ | DNQ | DNQ | | | | | | | | | DNQ | DNQ | 0 |
| | (United States) Evan Richard | Gas Gas | | | | | | | DNQ | DNQ | DNQ | DNQ | | | | | | | DNQ | DNQ | | | DNQ | DNQ | 0 |
| | (United States) Kyle Kunstman | KTM | | | | | | | DNQ | DNQ | | | DNQ | DNQ | DNQ | DNQ | | | | | | | DNQ | DNQ | 0 |
| | (United States) Christian McCauley | Yamaha | | | | | | | DNQ | DNQ | | | | | | | | | DNQ | DNQ | DNQ | DNQ | DNQ | DNQ | 0 |
| | (United States) Domenic Hegman | Yamaha | | | | | | | | | | | DNQ | DNQ | DNQ | DNQ | DNQ | DNQ | | | | | DNQ | DNQ | 0 |
| | (United States) Ragan Cochran | Gas Gas | DNQ | DNQ | DNQ | DNQ | DNQ | DNQ | | | | | | | | | | | | | | | | | 0 |
| | (United States) Ty Freehill | KTM | DNQ | DNQ | DNQ | DNQ | DNQ | DNQ | | | | | | | | | | | | | | | | | 0 |
| | (United States) Justin Aragaki | Husqvarna | DNQ | DNQ | DNQ | DNQ | | | | | | | | | | | DNQ | DNQ | | | | | | | 0 |
| | (United States) Brian Medeiros | Suzuki | DNQ | DNQ | DNQ | DNQ | | | | | | | | | | | DNQ | DNQ | | | | | | | 0 |
| | (United States) Josh Lee | Kawasaki | DNQ | DNQ | DNQ | DNQ | | | | | | | | | | | DNQ | DNQ | | | | | | | 0 |
| | (United States) Luke Bierek | Yamaha | DNQ | DNQ | DNQ | DNQ | | | | | | | | | | | DNQ | DNQ | | | | | | | 0 |
| | (United States) Jason Fichera | Kawasaki | DNQ | DNQ | | | DNQ | DNQ | | | | | | | | | DNQ | DNQ | | | | | | | 0 |
| | (United States) Brett Stralo | Gas Gas | DNQ | DNQ | | | DNQ | DNQ | | | | | | | | | DNQ | DNQ | | | | | | | 0 |
| | (United States) Travis Randanella | KTM | | | | | | | DNQ | DNQ | DNQ | DNQ | | | | | | | | | DNQ | DNQ | | | 0 |
| | (United States) Kyle Czworkowski | Honda | | | | | | | DNQ | DNQ | DNQ | DNQ | | | | | | | | | DNQ | DNQ | | | 0 |
| | (United States) Steven Keil | Honda | | | | | | | DNQ | DNQ | | | DNQ | DNQ | | | | | | | | | DNQ | DNQ | 0 |
| | (United States) Tyler Loud | KTM | | | | | | | | | DNQ | DNQ | | | | | | | DNQ | DNQ | DNQ | DNQ | | | 0 |
| | (United States) Conner Lords | Yamaha | | | | | | | | | | | DNQ | DNQ | DNQ | DNQ | DNQ | DNQ | | | | | | | 0 |
| | (United States) Dean Gall | Honda | | | | | | | | | | | DNQ | DNQ | DNQ | DNQ | | | DNQ | DNQ | | | | | 0 |
| | (United States) Alex Reinke | Yamaha | | | | | | | | | | | DNQ | DNQ | DNQ | DNQ | | | | | | | DNQ | DNQ | 0 |
| | (United States) Cory Broyles | Triumph | | | | | | | | | | | DNQ | DNQ | | | | | DNQ | DNQ | DNQ | DNQ | | | 0 |
| | (United States) Max Mayer | Husqvarna | | | | | | | | | | | DNQ | DNQ | | | | | | | DNQ | DNQ | DNQ | DNQ | 0 |
| | (United States) Luke Van Lyssel | Yamaha | | | | | | | | | | | | | DNQ | DNQ | DNQ | DNQ | | | | | DNQ | DNQ | 0 |
| | (United States) Charles Tolleson | Gas Gas | | | | | | | | | | | | | | | | | DNQ | DNQ | DNQ | DNQ | DNQ | DNQ | 0 |
| | (United States) Jace Kessler | Yamaha | DNQ | DNQ | DNQ | DNQ | | | | | | | | | | | | | | | | | | | 0 |
| | (United States) Jackson Gray | Husqvarna | DNQ | DNQ | DNQ | DNQ | | | | | | | | | | | | | | | | | | | 0 |
| | (United States) Jaret Finch | Husqvarna | DNQ | DNQ | DNQ | DNQ | | | | | | | | | | | | | | | | | | | 0 |
| | (United States) Austin Cozadd | Kawasaki | DNQ | DNQ | DNQ | DNQ | | | | | | | | | | | | | | | | | | | 0 |
| | (United States) Bryson Olson | Yamaha | DNQ | DNQ | DNQ | DNQ | | | | | | | | | | | | | | | | | | | 0 |
| | (United States) Owen Bills | Yamaha | | | DNQ | DNQ | | | | | | | | | | | DNQ | DNQ | | | | | | | 0 |
| | (United States) Cole Cook | KTM | | | DNQ | DNQ | | | | | | | | | | | DNQ | DNQ | | | | | | | 0 |
| | (United States) Deegan Hepp | Honda | | | | | DNQ | DNQ | | | | | | | DNQ | DNQ | | | | | | | | | 0 |
| | (United States) Lucas Padrutt | Yamaha | | | | | DNQ | DNQ | | | | | | | | | | | | | | | DNQ | DNQ | 0 |
| | (United States) Cameron Dufault | Husqvarna | | | | | | | DNQ | DNQ | DNQ | DNQ | | | | | | | | | | | | | 0 |
| | (United States) Andrew Wallace | Husqvarna | | | | | | | DNQ | DNQ | | | DNQ | DNQ | | | | | | | | | | | 0 |
| | (United States) Ronnie Snyder | Yamaha | | | | | | | DNQ | DNQ | | | | | | | | | DNQ | DNQ | | | | | 0 |
| | (United States) Cole Jones | Yamaha | | | | | | | DNQ | DNQ | | | | | | | | | | | DNQ | DNQ | | | 0 |
| | (United States) Braden Gray | Honda | | | | | | | DNQ | DNQ | | | | | | | | | | | | | DNQ | DNQ | 0 |
| | (United States) Pawel Maslak | Honda | | | | | | | | | DNQ | DNQ | | | | | | | DNQ | DNQ | | | | | 0 |
| | (United States) Tom Albano | Yamaha | | | | | | | | | DNQ | DNQ | | | | | | | DNQ | DNQ | | | | | 0 |
| | (United States) Matthew Vacendak | Husqvarna | | | | | | | | | DNQ | DNQ | | | | | | | DNQ | DNQ | | | | | 0 |
| | (United States) Austin Brooks | KTM | | | | | | | | | DNQ | DNQ | | | | | | | DNQ | DNQ | | | | | 0 |
| | (United States) Brodie Bennett | KTM | | | | | | | | | | | DNQ | DNQ | | | | | | | | | DNQ | DNQ | 0 |
| | (United States) Michael McLing | Yamaha | | | | | | | | | | | DNQ | DNQ | | | | | | | | | DNQ | DNQ | 0 |
| | (United States) Bryar Perry | Yamaha | | | | | | | | | | | | | DNQ | DNQ | DNQ | DNQ | | | | | | | 0 |
| | (United States) Ty Lepicier | KTM | | | | | | | | | | | | | | | | | DNQ | DNQ | DNQ | DNQ | | | 0 |
| | (Canada) Austin Jones | Yamaha | | | | | | | | | | | | | | | | | | | DNQ | DNQ | DNQ | DNQ | 0 |
| | (Canada) Devyn Smith | Kawasaki | | | | | | | | | | | | | | | | | | | DNQ | DNQ | DNQ | DNQ | 0 |
| | (United States) Cale Kuchnicki | Gas Gas | | | | | | | | | | | | | | | | | | | DNQ | DNQ | DNQ | DNQ | 0 |
| | (United States) Nick Jones | Honda | DNQ | DNQ | | | | | | | | | | | | | | | | | | | | | 0 |
| | (United States) Ben Blakely | Honda | DNQ | DNQ | | | | | | | | | | | | | | | | | | | | | 0 |
| | (United States) Wyatt Fields | Yamaha | | | DNQ | DNQ | | | | | | | | | | | | | | | | | | | 0 |
| | (United States) Derik Denzin | Yamaha | | | DNQ | DNQ | | | | | | | | | | | | | | | | | | | 0 |
| | (United States) Chase Forsberg | Yamaha | | | DNQ | DNQ | | | | | | | | | | | | | | | | | | | 0 |
| | (United States) Raice Hernandez | KTM | | | | | DNQ | DNQ | | | | | | | | | | | | | | | | | 0 |
| | (United States) Kyle DeRoche | Yamaha | | | | | DNQ | DNQ | | | | | | | | | | | | | | | | | 0 |
| | (United States) Damon Strobel | Yamaha | | | | | DNQ | DNQ | | | | | | | | | | | | | | | | | 0 |
| | (United States) Jake Bork | Honda | | | | | DNQ | DNQ | | | | | | | | | | | | | | | | | 0 |
| | (United States) Anthony Roth | Honda | | | | | DNQ | DNQ | | | | | | | | | | | | | | | | | 0 |
| | (United States) Tyler Aldor | Yamaha | | | | | DNQ | DNQ | | | | | | | | | | | | | | | | | 0 |
| | (United States) Jake Walker | KTM | | | | | | | | | DNQ | DNQ | | | | | | | | | | | | | 0 |
| | (United States) Nick McDonnell | Gas Gas | | | | | | | | | DNQ | DNQ | | | | | | | | | | | | | 0 |
| | (United States) Tony Lorusso | Yamaha | | | | | | | | | DNQ | DNQ | | | | | | | | | | | | | 0 |
| | (United States) Jake Varney | KTM | | | | | | | | | DNQ | DNQ | | | | | | | | | | | | | 0 |
| | (United States) Matt Hammer | Yamaha | | | | | | | | | DNQ | DNQ | | | | | | | | | | | | | 0 |
| | (United States) Benji Robinson | Suzuki | | | | | | | | | DNQ | DNQ | | | | | | | | | | | | | 0 |
| | (United States) Andrew Boccarossa | Yamaha | | | | | | | | | DNQ | DNQ | | | | | | | | | | | | | 0 |
| | (United States) Sam St Laurent | KTM | | | | | | | | | DNQ | DNQ | | | | | | | | | | | | | 0 |
| | (United States) Eddie Norred | Kawasaki | | | | | | | | | DNQ | DNQ | | | | | | | | | | | | | 0 |
| | (United States) Travis Pelotte | KTM | | | | | | | | | DNQ | DNQ | | | | | | | | | | | | | 0 |
| | (United States) Hunter Stempel | Husqvarna | | | | | | | | | DNQ | DNQ | | | | | | | | | | | | | 0 |
| | (United States) Ryan Langan | Yamaha | | | | | | | | | DNQ | DNQ | | | | | | | | | | | | | 0 |
| | (United States) Alex White | KTM | | | | | | | | | DNQ | DNQ | | | | | | | | | | | | | 0 |
| | (United States) Patrick Coreno | Kawasaki | | | | | | | | | DNQ | DNQ | | | | | | | | | | | | | 0 |
| | (United States) Noah Willbrandt | Yamaha | | | | | | | | | | | DNQ | DNQ | | | | | | | | | | | 0 |
| | (United States) Brandon Bollino | Yamaha | | | | | | | | | | | DNQ | DNQ | | | | | | | | | | | 0 |
| | (United States) Jordon Fancher | Honda | | | | | | | | | | | DNQ | DNQ | | | | | | | | | | | 0 |
| | (United States) Alex Nagy | Honda | | | | | | | | | | | | | DNQ | DNQ | | | | | | | | | 0 |
| | (United States) Brandon Espe | Gas Gas | | | | | | | | | | | | | DNQ | DNQ | | | | | | | | | 0 |
| | (United States) Tucker Nelson | KTM | | | | | | | | | | | | | DNQ | DNQ | | | | | | | | | 0 |
| | (United States) Jeremy Kowalsky | Honda | | | | | | | | | | | | | DNQ | DNQ | | | | | | | | | 0 |
| | (United States) Dylan Summerlin | Gas Gas | | | | | | | | | | | | | | | DNQ | DNQ | | | | | | | 0 |
| | (United States) Seth Crotty | Yamaha | | | | | | | | | | | | | | | DNQ | DNQ | | | | | | | 0 |
| | (United States) Chase Reid | KTM | | | | | | | | | | | | | | | DNQ | DNQ | | | | | | | 0 |
| | (United States) Bryan O'Neil | Kawasaki | | | | | | | | | | | | | | | DNQ | DNQ | | | | | | | 0 |
| | (United States) Skyler Adams | KTM | | | | | | | | | | | | | | | DNQ | DNQ | | | | | | | 0 |
| | (United States) Matthew Wilson | Gas Gas | | | | | | | | | | | | | | | DNQ | DNQ | | | | | | | 0 |
| | (United States) Austin Kapoukranidis | Yamaha | | | | | | | | | | | | | | | | | DNQ | DNQ | | | | | 0 |
| | (United States) Blaze Cremaldi | Yamaha | | | | | | | | | | | | | | | | | DNQ | DNQ | | | | | 0 |
| | (United States) Dylan Moriarty | Yamaha | | | | | | | | | | | | | | | | | DNQ | DNQ | | | | | 0 |
| | (United States) Spencer Mang | Honda | | | | | | | | | | | | | | | | | DNQ | DNQ | | | | | 0 |
| | (United States) Bryton Carroll | Triumph | | | | | | | | | | | | | | | | | | | DNQ | DNQ | | | 0 |
| | (United States) Cory Cooper | Honda | | | | | | | | | | | | | | | | | | | DNQ | DNQ | | | 0 |
| | (United States) Grayson Fair | KTM | | | | | | | | | | | | | | | | | | | | | DNQ | DNQ | 0 |
| | (United States) Brady Neys | KTM | | | | | | | | | | | | | | | | | | | | | DNQ | DNQ | 0 |
| Pos | Rider | Bike | FOX (California) | | HAN (California) | | THU (Colorado) | | HIG (Pennsylvania) | | SOU (Massachusetts) | | RED (Michigan) | | SPR (Minnesota) | | WAS (Washington (state)) | | UNA (New York (state)) | | BUD (Maryland) | | IRN (Indiana) | | Points |
