= 2023 FIM Supercross World Championship =

2023 Supercross World Championship season

The 2023 FIM Supercross World Championship is a supercross series sanctioned by the Fédération Internationale de Motocyclisme (FIM) as the world championship of the sport. This is the second season that the championship is being organized by Australian promoter SX Global. Ken Roczen is the reigning champion in the WSX class for 450cc motorcycles, whilst Shane McElrath is the reigning champion in the SX2 class.

Ultimately, many of the initially scheduled rounds were later cancelled, producing a three round series. Roczen was able to successfully defend his title in the WSX championship, whilst it was Max Anstie who triumphed in SX2 where he became the first British champion of an FIM-sanctioned supercross world championship.

== Calendar and results ==
The 2023 season is scheduled to have 6 events in Europe, Canada, Singapore, UAE and Australia. A French round was initially meant to be part of the calendar, but was later replaced by the round in UAE.

| Round | Date | Grand Prix | Location | Stadium | WSX Winner | SX2 Winner |
|---|---|---|---|---|---|---|
| 1 | 1 July | (United Kingdom) British Grand Prix | Birmingham | Villa Park | (Germany) Ken Roczen | (United States) Shane McElrath |
| 2 | 4–5 November | (United Arab Emirates) Abu Dhabi Grand Prix | Abu Dhabi | Etihad Arena | (United States) Joey Savatgy | (United Kingdom) Max Anstie |
| 3 | 24–25 November | (Australia) Australian Grand Prix | Melbourne | Marvel Stadium | (Germany) Ken Roczen | (United Kingdom) Max Anstie |

== WSX ==
=== Entry list ===
Licensed Teams & Riders
| Team | Constructor | No | Rider | Rounds |
|---|---|---|---|---|
| (United States) Progressive ECSTAR PMG | Suzuki | 1 | (Germany) Ken Roczen | All |
| (United States) Progressive ECSTAR PMG | Suzuki | 11 | (United States) Kyle Chisholm | All |
| (United States) MCR Honda | Honda | 3 | (United States) Vince Friese | All |
| (United States) MCR Honda | Honda | 14 | (United States) Cole Seely | 1 |
| (United States) MCR Honda | Honda | 49 | (United States) Mitchell Oldenburg | 2–3 |
| (France) Team GSM HBI Michelin | Yamaha | 6 | (France) Thomas Ramette | All |
| (France) Team GSM HBI Michelin | Yamaha | 20 | (France) Grégory Aranda | All |
| (United States) MDK Motorsports | KTM | 7 | (Venezuela) Anthony Rodríguez | All |
| (United States) MDK Motorsports | KTM | 68 | (United States) Cade Clason | All |
| (Australia) Monster Energy CDR Yamaha | Yamaha | 9 | (Australia) Aaron Tanti | 2 |
| (Australia) Monster Energy CDR Yamaha | Yamaha | 75 | (United States) Josh Hill | All |
| (Australia) Monster Energy CDR Yamaha | Yamaha | 78 | (United States) Grant Harlan | 1 |
| (Australia) Fire Power Honda Racing | Honda | 10 | (United States) Justin Brayton | All |
| (Australia) Fire Power Honda Racing | Honda | 15 | (United Kingdom) Dean Wilson | All |
| (United States) FXR ClubMX | Yamaha | 16 | (Canada) Cole Thompson | |
| (United States) FXR ClubMX | Yamaha | 22 | (Australia) Rhys Budd | 3 |
| (United States) FXR ClubMX | Yamaha | 69 | (United States) Phil Nicoletti | 2–3 |
| (United States) FXR ClubMX | Yamaha | 102 | (Australia) Matt Moss | 1–2 |
| (United States) FXR ClubMX | Yamaha | 519 | (United States) Josh Cartwright | 1 |
| (United States) Mobil 1 Rick Ware Racing MX | Kawasaki | 17 | (United States) Joey Savatgy | All |
| (United States) Mobil 1 Rick Ware Racing MX | Kawasaki | 45 | (United States) Colt Nichols | All |
| (France) Team BUD Kawasaki | Kawasaki | 46 | (United States) Justin Hill | All |
| (France) Team BUD Kawasaki | Kawasaki | 85 | (France) Cédric Soubeyras | All |
| (Italy) Honda NILS WSX | Honda | 80 | (United States) Kevin Moranz | All |
| (Italy) Honda NILS WSX | Honda | 911 | (France) Jordi Tixier | All |
Wildcard Teams & Riders
| (Australia) Boom Racing Fox Husqvarna | Husqvarna | 64 | (Australia) Dylan Wills | 3 |
| (United Kingdom) FUS Marsh Geartec Husqvarna | Husqvarna | 155 | (United Kingdom) Jack Brunell | 1 |
| (United Kingdom) SR75 World Team Suzuki | Suzuki | 225 | (France) Charles Lefrançois | 1 |

==== Riders Championship ====
| Pos | Nr | Rider | Bike | GBR (United Kingdom) | | | UAE (United Arab Emirates) | | | AUS (Australia) | | | Points |
|---|---|---|---|---|---|---|---|---|---|---|---|---|---|
| 1 | 1 | (Germany) Ken Roczen | Suzuki | 1 | 4 | 1 | 14 | 3 | 1 | 1 | 1 | 3 | 193 |
| 2 | 17 | (United States) Joey Savatgy | Kawasaki | 4 | 2 | 2 | 1 | 4 | 2 | 3 | 10 | 4 | 176 |
| 3 | 15 | (United Kingdom) Dean Wilson | Honda | 6 | 5 | 3 | 6 | 1 | 3 | 5 | 4 | 2 | 167 |
| 4 | 3 | (United States) Vince Friese | Honda | 2 | 3 | 10 | 3 | 2 | 8 | 4 | 12 | 7 | 149 |
| 5 | 46 | (United States) Justin Hill | Kawasaki | 3 | 1 | 15 | 7 | 8 | 12 | 12 | 9 | 8 | 122 |
| 6 | 20 | (France) Grégory Aranda | Yamaha | 16 | 6 | 5 | 16 | 5 | 4 | 16 | 2 | 6 | 117 |
| 7 | 85 | (France) Cédric Soubeyras | Kawasaki | 18 | 12 | 12 | 2 | 6 | 5 | 6 | 7 | 10 | 114 |
| 8 | 11 | (United States) Kyle Chisholm | Suzuki | 10 | 7 | 4 | 11 | 12 | 6 | 9 | 14 | 9 | 108 |
| 9 | 49 | (United States) Mitchell Oldenburg | Honda | | | | 4 | 9 | DSQ | 2 | 3 | 5 | 89 |
| 10 | 45 | (United States) Colt Nichols | Kawasaki | 7 | 9 | 8 | 15 | 18 | DNS | 15 | 13 | 1 | 87 |
| 11 | 75 | (United States) Josh Hill | Yamaha | 12 | 13 | 6 | 18 | 11 | 9 | 17 | 8 | 12 | 83 |
| 12 | 68 | (United States) Cade Clason | KTM | 19 | 11 | 11 | 8 | 15 | 11 | 8 | 15 | 11 | 80 |
| 13 | 10 | (United States) Justin Brayton | Honda | 5 | 8 | 9 | Ret | DNS | DNS | 7 | 6 | 15 | 76 |
| 14 | 80 | (United States) Kevin Moranz | Honda | 13 | 10 | 7 | 10 | 14 | 10 | 19 | 20 | 17 | 69 |
| 15 | 911 | (France) Jordi Tixier | Honda | 15 | 16 | 14 | 12 | 13 | DNS | 11 | 11 | 8 | 63 |
| 16 | 6 | (France) Thomas Ramette | Yamaha | 9 | 18 | 19 | 5 | 17 | 7 | 20 | 18 | 18 | 58 |
| 17 | 7 | (Venezuela) Anthony Rodríguez | KTM | 14 | 14 | 13 | 13 | 16 | 13 | 13 | 16 | 19 | 58 |
| 18 | 69 | (United States) Phil Nicoletti | Yamaha | | | | 9 | 7 | 14 | 14 | 5 | 20 | 57 |
| 19 | 102 | (Australia) Matt Moss | Yamaha | 11 | Ret | DNS | 17 | 10 | 15 | | | | 32 |
| 20 | 22 | (Australia) Rhys Budd | Yamaha | | | | | | | 10 | 17 | 14 | 22 |
| 21 | 14 | (United States) Cole Seely | Honda | 8 | 15 | 20 | | | | | | | 20 |
| 22 | 64 | (Australia) Dylan Wills | Husqvarna | | | | | | | 18 | 19 | 16 | 10 |
| 23 | 155 | (United Kingdom) Jack Brunell | Husqvarna | 21 | 17 | 17 | | | | | | | 8 |
| 24 | 225 | (France) Charles Lefrançois | Suzuki | 22 | 19 | 16 | | | | | | | 7 |
| 25 | 519 | (United States) Josh Cartwright | Yamaha | 20 | 20 | 18 | | | | | | | 5 |
| 26 | 78 | (United States) Grant Harlan | Yamaha | 17 | 21 | DNS | | | | | | | 4 |
| | 9 | (Australia) Aaron Tanti | Yamaha | | | | Ret | DNS | DNS | | | | 0 |
| Pos | Nr | Rider | Bike | GBR (United Kingdom) | | | UAE (United Arab Emirates) | | | AUS (Australia) | | | Points |

== SX2 ==
=== Entry list ===
Licensed Teams & Riders
| Team | Constructor | No | Rider | Rounds |
|---|---|---|---|---|
| (United States) Mobil 1 Rick Ware Racing MX | Yamaha | 1 | (United States) Shane McElrath | All |
| (United States) Mobil 1 Rick Ware Racing MX | Yamaha | 66 | (United States) Henry Miller | All |
| (Italy) Honda NILS WSX | Honda | 3 | (United States) Chris Blose | All |
| (Italy) Honda NILS WSX | Honda | 96 | (Australia) Kyle Webster | 2–3 |
| (Italy) Honda NILS WSX | Honda | 110 | (United States) Kyle Peters | 1 |
| (Australia) Monster Energy CDR Yamaha | Yamaha | 4 | (Australia) Luke Clout | All |
| (Australia) Monster Energy CDR Yamaha | Yamaha | 9 | (Australia) Aaron Tanti | 1 |
| (Australia) Monster Energy CDR Yamaha | Yamaha | 59 | (United States) Robbie Wageman | 2–3 |
| (United States) MCR Honda | Honda | 7 | (United States) Mitchell Oldenburg | 1 |
| (United States) MCR Honda | Honda | 122 | (United States) Carson Mumford | 2–3 |
| (United States) MCR Honda | Honda | 800 | (United States) Mike Alessi | All |
| (United States) FXR ClubMX | Yamaha | 16 | (Canada) Cole Thompson | 2–3 |
| (United States) FXR ClubMX | Yamaha | 56 | (Brazil) Enzo Lopes | 1 |
| (United States) FXR ClubMX | Yamaha | 125 | (United States) Luke Neese | All |
| (United States) MDK Motorsports | KTM | 19 | (United States) Justin Bogle | All |
| (United States) MDK Motorsports | KTM | 604 | (United States) Max Miller | All |
| (Australia) Fire Power Honda Racing | Honda | 20 | (Australia) Wilson Todd | 2–3 |
| (Australia) Fire Power Honda Racing | Honda | 40 | (United States) Gage Linville | 1 |
| (Australia) Fire Power Honda Racing | Honda | 99 | (United Kingdom) Max Anstie | All |
| (United States) Progressive ECSTAR PMG | Suzuki | 58 | (United States) Hunter Yoder | All |
| (United States) Progressive ECSTAR PMG | Suzuki | 67 | (United States) Cullin Park | All |
| (France) Team BUD Kawasaki | Kawasaki | 137 | (France) Adrien Escoffier | All |
| (France) Team BUD Kawasaki | Kawasaki | 945 | (France) Anthony Bourdon | All |
| (France) Team GSM HBI Michelin | Yamaha | 141 | (France) Maxime Desprey | All |
| (France) Team GSM HBI Michelin | Yamaha | 401 | (United States) Jace Owen | All |
Wildcard Teams & Riders
| (Australia) Yamalube Yamaha Racing | Yamaha | 116 | (Australia) Kaleb Barham | 3 |
| (Australia) KTM Racing Team | KTM | 199 | (Australia) Nathan Crawford | 3 |
| (United Kingdom) 723 Troy Lee Designs Fantic | Fantic | 260 | (United Kingdom) Dylan Woodcock | 1 |

==== Riders Championship ====
| Pos | Nr | Rider | Bike | GBR (United Kingdom) | | | UAE (United Arab Emirates) | | | AUS (Australia) | | | Points |
|---|---|---|---|---|---|---|---|---|---|---|---|---|---|
| 1 | 99 | (United Kingdom) Max Anstie | Honda | 2 | 1 | 2 | 3 | 1 | 1 | 1 | 1 | 1 | 216 |
| 2 | 1 | (United States) Shane McElrath | Yamaha | 1 | 2 | 1 | 8 | 8 | 11 | 19 | 3 | 11 | 140 |
| 3 | 4 | (Australia) Luke Clout | Yamaha | 5 | Ret | 8 | 4 | 15 | 7 | 2 | 4 | 3 | 127 |
| 4 | 141 | (France) Maxime Desprey | Yamaha | 10 | 7 | 5 | 2 | 9 | 2 | 16 | 8 | 14 | 122 |
| 5 | 67 | (United States) Cullin Park | Suzuki | 8 | 19 | 7 | 5 | 18 | 5 | 4 | 5 | 4 | 116 |
| 6 | 16 | (Canada) Cole Thompson | Yamaha | | | | 6 | 2 | 10 | 5 | 2 | 2 | 108 |
| 7 | 3 | (United States) Chris Blose | Honda | 12 | 4 | 20 | 1 | 3 | 3 | 18 | 17 | 16 | 105 |
| 8 | 945 | (France) Anthony Bourdon | Kawasaki | 15 | 12 | 14 | 17 | 14 | 8 | 7 | 7 | 8 | 87 |
| 9 | 66 | (United States) Henry Miller | Yamaha | 9 | 9 | 9 | 18 | 11 | 19 | 8 | 14 | 13 | 79 |
| 10 | 20 | (Australia) Wilson Todd | Honda | | | | 7 | 17 | 4 | 11 | 6 | 5 | 77 |
| 11 | 137 | (France) Adrien Escoffier | Kawasaki | Ret | 10 | 13 | 12 | 12 | 13 | 14 | 9 | 12 | 73 |
| 12 | 122 | (United States) Carson Mumford | Honda | | | | 16 | 10 | 14 | 3 | 11 | 6 | 68 |
| 13 | 125 | (United States) Luke Neese | Yamaha | 20 | 17 | 17 | 9 | 5 | 6 | 13 | 19 | 17 | 66 |
| 14 | 58 | (United States) Hunter Yoder | Suzuki | 17 | 18 | 12 | 19 | 13 | 20 | 6 | 13 | 7 | 64 |
| 15 | 401 | (United States) Jace Owen | Yamaha | 11 | 5 | 15 | 20 | 7 | 9 | DNS | DNS | DNS | 59 |
| 16 | 59 | (United States) Robbie Wageman | Yamaha | | | | 13 | 6 | 15 | 9 | 10 | 15 | 58 |
| 17 | 56 | (Brazil) Enzo Lopes | Yamaha | 4 | 3 | 4 | | | | | | | 57 |
| 18 | 7 | (United States) Mitchell Oldenburg | Honda | 3 | 14 | 3 | | | | | | | 47 |
| 19 | 604 | (United States) Max Miller | KTM | 14 | 16 | 11 | 14 | 20 | 17 | 12 | 18 | 20 | 47 |
| 20 | 110 | (United States) Kyle Peters | Honda | 6 | 6 | 6 | | | | | | | 45 |
| 21 | 19 | (United States) Justin Bogle | KTM | 13 | 20 | 16 | 11 | 19 | 16 | Ret | 15 | 18 | 40 |
| 22 | 96 | (Australia) Kyle Webster | Honda | | | | 10 | 4 | 12 | 20 | DNS | 21 | 39 |
| 23 | 800 | (United States) Mike Alessi | Honda | 19 | 11 | Ret | 15 | 16 | 18 | 15 | 16 | 19 | 39 |
| 24 | 9 | (Australia) Aaron Tanti | Yamaha | 7 | 8 | 10 | | | | | | | 38 |
| 25 | 116 | (Australia) Kaleb Barham | Yamaha | | | | | | | 10 | 12 | 10 | 39 |
| 26 | 199 | (Australia) Nathan Crawford | KTM | | | | | | | 17 | 20 | 9 | 17 |
| 27 | 260 | (United Kingdom) Dylan Woodcock | Fantic | 16 | 15 | 18 | | | | | | | 14 |
| 28 | 40 | (United States) Gage Linville | Honda | 18 | 13 | 19 | | | | | | | 13 |
| Pos | Nr | Rider | Bike | GBR (United Kingdom) | | | UAE (United Arab Emirates) | | | AUS (Australia) | | | Points |
