= Jalek Swoll =

American motocross racer

- Nationality: American
- Born: 16 April 2000 (age 26); Belleview, Florida

Jalek Swoll (born 16 April 2000) is an American professional Motocross and Supercross racer. Swoll has competed professionally in the AMA Supercross Championship and AMA Motocross Championship since making his debut towards the end of the 2019 outdoor season.

Swoll took his first professional win during the 2021 AMA National Motocross Championship, when he won the 250 class at the third round.

Prior to turning professional, Swoll won six titles in the AMA Amateur National Motocross Championship and was awarded the AMA Nicky Hayden Amateur Horizon Award in 2019.

== Career ==
=== Amateur career ===
Swoll progressed through the ranks of the American amateur system, achieving notable results through each class at the AMA Amateur National Motocross Championship. Winning five titles prior to his final amateur season, Swoll was able to win the Open Pro Sport class in 2019, despite suffering from a groin injury. In addition to this title, Swoll was named the Nicky Hayden AMA Horizon Award winner.

=== 250 career ===
Rockstar Husqvarna

After receiving support from the Rockstar Energy Husqvarna Factory Racing team during the latter part of his amateur career, Swoll made his professional debut for them at tenth round of the 2019 AMA National Motocross Championship. Racing in the 250SX East class, Swoll finished in the top-ten in all but two rounds, with a sixth at the third Salt Lake City round being his best result. He had a tough first full outdoor season in the 2020 AMA National Motocross Championship, picking up a concussion at the opening round, which ruled him out until round four. After returning, his debut outdoor season ended prematurely due to a lingering shoulder injury that required surgery, meaning he missed the final two rounds.

Swoll raced in the 250SX West class in the 2021 AMA Supercross Championship, finishing in the top-six across five of the nine rounds. Included within this was his first professional supercross podium at the fourth round in Arlington, Texas. After finishing fifth in the supercross standings, Swoll showed further improvement in the outdoor season, taking his professional race and overall win at the third round of the series. Later in the season, he crashed during qualifying at the tenth round, resulting in a dislocated shoulder that ruled him out for the rest of the year. Returning for the start of the 250SX West class of the 2022 AMA Supercross Championship, Swoll had a crash in the heat race at the opening round, ruling him out until round three. He would eventually finish tenth in the final standings, with a fifth at the fourth round being his best result. Swoll finished fourteenth in the 2022 AMA National Motocross Championship, with eighth overall at the penultimate event being his best result.

After initially being scheduled to compete in the 250SX East class of the 2023 AMA Supercross Championship, Swoll broke his arm during a practice crash and subsequently missed the indoor season entirely. Returning for the 2023 AMA National Motocross Championship, Swoll finished ninth in the standings, with a third place race finish at the penultimate round being the highlight.

Triumph

For the 2024 season, Swoll signed for the Triumph Racing team, forming part of the manufacturer's first professional team in American off-road motorcycle racing. Racing in the 250SX East class, he finished seventh in the final standings, with fifth at the seventh round being his best result. In the 2024 AMA National Motocross Championship, Swoll improved on the previous season's results, pushing back into the top-six regularly and securing third overall at the ninth round. A crash at the first of the season ending SuperMotocross rounds saw him pick up a concussion that ended his season. Swoll's injury woes continued into the 2025 season, where he missed the entire supercross campaign following a torn achilles picked up before the first round. Swoll was not able to return until the fourth round of the 2025 AMA National Motocross Championship, landing on the podium two rounds later with second overall at Red Bud. After aggravating a thumb injury and tearing a calf muscle at the ninth round, Swoll ended his season to recover from the injuries.

Swoll returned from injury in the 250SX East class of the 2026 AMA Supercross Championship but another achilles injury during qualifying at the fourth round ended his season prematurely.

== Honours ==
AMA Amateur National Motocross Championship

- Open Pro Sport: 2019 (gold)
- 250 B: 2018 (gold)
- Schoolboy 2 (12-17) B/C: 2018 (gold)
- 125 (12-16) B/C: 2016 (gold)
- Schoolboy 1 (12-16) B/C: 2016 (gold)
- Mini Sr.1 (12-13): 2014 (silver)
- Mini Sr.2 (12-14): 2014 (bronze)
- 85 (9-11) Limited: 2013 (gold)
- 85 (9-11): 2013 (bronze)
- 65 (7-9) Stock: 2011 (bronze)

Monster Energy Cup

- 250 Futures: 2019 (silver)
- All-Stars: 2018 (silver)

AMA Nicky Hayden Amateur Horizon Award

- 2019 (gold)

== Career statistics ==
=== AMA Supercross Championship ===
==== By season ====
Season	Class	Number	Motorcycle	Team	Overall Wins	Overall Podium	Pts	Plcd
2020	250SX East	352	Husqvarna	Rockstar Energy Husqvarna Factory Racing	0	0	104	7th
2021	250SX West	47	Husqvarna	Rockstar Energy Husqvarna Factory Racing	0	1	153	5th
2022	250SX West	31	Husqvarna	Rockstar Energy Husqvarna Factory Racing	0	0	106	10th
2024	250SX East	33	Triumph	Triumph Racing	0	0	116	7th
2026	250SX East	56	Triumph	Triumph Factory Racing Team	0	0	27	22nd
Total					0	1	506	

=== AMA National Motocross Championship ===
==== By season ====
Season	Class	Number	Motorcycle	Team	Races	Race Wins	Overall Wins	Race Top-3	Overall Podium	Pts	Plcd
2019	250	352	Husqvarna	Rockstar Energy Husqvarna Factory Racing	2	0	0	0	0	2	46th
2020	250	352	Husqvarna	Rockstar Energy Husqvarna Factory Racing	9	0	0	0	0	19	28th
2021	250	47	Husqvarna	Rockstar Energy Husqvarna Factory Racing	17	1	1	2	1	195	11th
2022	250	31	Husqvarna	Rockstar Energy Husqvarna Factory Racing	20	0	0	0	0	142	14th
2023	250	38	Husqvarna	Rockstar Energy Husqvarna Factory Racing	22	0	0	1	0	221	9th
2024	250	33	Triumph	Triumph Racing	22	0	0	0	1	277	7th
2025	250	22	Triumph	Triumph Factory Racing Team	11	0	0	1	1	115	20th
Total					103	1	1	4	3	971	
