= 2025 AMA National Motocross Championship =

2024 AMA motocross championship season

The 2025 AMA Motocross Championship season was the 54th AMA Motocross National Championship season, the premier motocross series in USA.

Chase Sexton was the defending champion in the 450 class, after winning the title in 2024. Sexton was unable to defend his title after missing part of the season due to an injury sustained at the opening round. Jett Lawrence won all but two rounds of the series to take his second premier class title.

In the 250 class, Haiden Deegan was the defending champion. Deegan was able to successfully defend his championship, taking thirteen race wins and seven overall victories.

The championship formed the second part of the 2025 SuperMotocross World Championship season.

== Calendar and Results ==
=== 450cc ===
Round	Date	Location	Race 1 Winner	Race 2 Winner	Round Winner
1	May 24	(California) Fox Raceway National	(Australia) Jett Lawrence	(Australia) Jett Lawrence	(Australia) Jett Lawrence
2	May 31	(California) Hangtown Motocross Classic	(United States) Eli Tomac	(Australia) Jett Lawrence	(Australia) Jett Lawrence
3	June 7	(Colorado) Thunder Valley National	(Australia) Jett Lawrence	(Australia) Jett Lawrence	(Australia) Jett Lawrence
4	June 14	(Pennsylvania) High Point National	(Australia) Jett Lawrence	(United States) Eli Tomac	(Australia) Jett Lawrence
5	June 28	(Massachusetts) Southwick National	(Australia) Jett Lawrence	(Australia) Jett Lawrence	(Australia) Jett Lawrence
6	July 5	(Michigan) Red Bud National	(Australia) Jett Lawrence	(Australia) Jett Lawrence	(Australia) Jett Lawrence
7	July 12	(Minnesota) Spring Creek National	(Australia) Hunter Lawrence	(Australia) Jett Lawrence	(Australia) Jett Lawrence
8	July 19	(Washington (state)) Washougal National	(United States) Chase Sexton	(Australia) Jett Lawrence	(United States) Chase Sexton
9	August 9	(Indiana) Ironman National	(United States) Chase Sexton	(Australia) Jett Lawrence	(Australia) Hunter Lawrence
10	August 16	(New York (state)) Unadilla National	(Australia) Jett Lawrence	(Australia) Jett Lawrence	(Australia) Jett Lawrence
11	August 23	(Maryland) Budds Creek National	(Australia) Jett Lawrence	(Australia) Hunter Lawrence	(Australia) Jett Lawrence

=== 250cc ===
Round	Date	Location	Race 1 Winner	Race 2 Winner	Round Winner
1	May 24	(California) Fox Raceway National	(United States) Haiden Deegan	(United States) Haiden Deegan	(United States) Haiden Deegan
2	May 31	(California) Hangtown Motocross Classic	(United States) Haiden Deegan	(United States) Haiden Deegan	(United States) Haiden Deegan
3	June 7	(Colorado) Thunder Valley National	(United States) Chance Hymas	(United States) Chance Hymas	(United States) Chance Hymas
4	June 14	(Pennsylvania) High Point National	(United States) Haiden Deegan	(United States) Haiden Deegan	(United States) Haiden Deegan
5	June 28	(Massachusetts) Southwick National	(United States) Haiden Deegan	(United States) Haiden Deegan	(United States) Haiden Deegan
6	July 5	(Michigan) Red Bud National	(Japan) Jo Shimoda	(Japan) Jo Shimoda	(Japan) Jo Shimoda
7	July 12	(Minnesota) Spring Creek National	(United States) Haiden Deegan	(United States) Jeremy Martin	(United States) Haiden Deegan
8	July 19	(Washington (state)) Washougal National	(United States) Haiden Deegan	(Japan) Jo Shimoda	(Japan) Jo Shimoda
9	August 9	(Indiana) Ironman National	(United States) Haiden Deegan	(United States) Haiden Deegan	(United States) Haiden Deegan
10	August 16	(New York (state)) Unadilla National	(Japan) Jo Shimoda	(Japan) Jo Shimoda	(Japan) Jo Shimoda
11	August 23	(Maryland) Budds Creek National	(New Zealand) Cole Davies	(United States) Haiden Deegan	(United States) Haiden Deegan

=== Track locations ===
2025 AMA Motocross Championship locations

== 450cc ==
=== Entry list ===
Team	Constructor	No	Rider	Rounds
Red Bull KTM Factory Racing	KTM	1	(United States) Chase Sexton	1, 6–9
Red Bull KTM Factory Racing	KTM	7	(United States) Aaron Plessinger	1–7
Monster Energy Yamaha Star Racing	Yamaha	2	(United States) Cooper Webb	1–6
Monster Energy Yamaha Star Racing	Yamaha	3	(United States) Eli Tomac	All
Monster Energy Yamaha Star Racing	Yamaha	32	(United States) Justin Cooper	All
QuadLock Honda Racing	Honda	12	(United States) Shane McElrath	9–11
QuadLock Honda Racing	Honda	17	(United States) Joey Savatgy	1–6
QuadLock Honda Racing	Honda	69	(Australia) Kyle Webster	9–11
Phoenix Racing Honda	Honda	14	(France) Dylan Ferrandis	9–11
Phoenix Racing Honda	Honda	184	(United States) Mike Witkowski	5
Team Honda HRC Progressive	Honda	18	(Australia) Jett Lawrence	All
Team Honda HRC Progressive	Honda	96	(Australia) Hunter Lawrence	All
Monster Energy Kawasaki	Kawasaki	21	(United States) Jason Anderson	1–6
Monster Energy Kawasaki	Kawasaki	70	(Spain) Jorge Prado	All
Rockstar Energy Husqvarna Factory Racing	Husqvarna	24	(United States) RJ Hampshire	All
Rockstar Energy Husqvarna Factory Racing	Husqvarna	27	(United States) Malcolm Stewart	All
International Supercross Race Team	Kawasaki	33	(Sweden) Fredrik Norén	1–5
International Supercross Race Team	Kawasaki	79	(United States) Max Miller	6–11
International Supercross Race Team	Kawasaki	208	(United States) Logan Leitzel	3–7, 9–11
International Supercross Race Team	Kawasaki	271	(Italy) Nicholas Lapucci	1
Gizmo Mods Rock River Yamaha Racing	Yamaha	35	(United States) Marshal Weltin	6–11
Gizmo Mods Rock River Yamaha Racing	Yamaha	43	(United States) Grant Harlan	1–2, 4–6
Gizmo Mods Rock River Yamaha Racing	Yamaha	97	(United States) Bryce Shelly	All
Gizmo Mods Rock River Yamaha Racing	Yamaha	992	(Switzerland) Valentin Guillod	All
Muc-Off FXR ClubMX Yamaha Racing	Yamaha	37	(United States) Coty Schock	All
MRPSBR Husqvarna Racing	Husqvarna	42	(Estonia) Harri Kullas	All
MRPSBR Husqvarna Racing	Husqvarna	81	(Denmark) Matti Jørgensen	All
MRPSBR Husqvarna Racing	Husqvarna	328	(United States) Brayden Gibson	All
MRPSBR Husqvarna Racing	Husqvarna	667	(Sweden) Anton Nordström	8
Twisted Tea Suzuki Presented by Progressive Insurance	Suzuki	45	(United States) Colt Nichols	1–8
Twisted Tea Suzuki Presented by Progressive Insurance	Suzuki	102	(France) Benoît Paturel	All
Rockstar Energy GASGAS Factory Racing	Gas Gas	51	(United States) Justin Barcia	5–11
Team VHR Racing	Yamaha	53	(France) Romain Pape	All
Team VHR Racing	Yamaha	103	(France) Scotty Verhaeghe	All
MX6 Racing Team	Yamaha	55	(United States) Henry Miller	6–11
MX6 Racing Team	Yamaha	58	(United States) Derek Kelley	1–6
MX6 Racing Team	Yamaha	314	(United States) Tyler Stepek	1–6
MX6 Racing Team	Yamaha	771	(Netherlands) Kevin Buitenhuis	5
Factory Liqui Moly Beta Racing	Beta	57	(United States) Benny Bloss	2–4
Factory Liqui Moly Beta Racing	Beta	837	(United States) Bryson Gardner	2–4
Valley Motorsports	Honda	68	(United States) Jeremy Hand	4, 6–11
Rides Unlimited Rocky Mountain ATV MC Racing	KTM	72	(Venezuela) Anthony Rodríguez	6
Wildcat Race Team	Gas Gas	74	(Venezuela) Lorenzo Locurcio	1–2, 4–11
Wildcat Race Team	Gas Gas	259	(Venezuela) Daniel Bortolín	1–2
Partzilla Blaster Power PRMX Kawasaki	Kawasaki	78	(United States) Cade Clason	4, 6–8
Partzilla Blaster Power PRMX Kawasaki	Kawasaki	86	(United States) Mitchell Harrison	All
Miller Racing	Yamaha	79	(United States) Max Miller	1–3
Toyota Redlands BarX Yamaha	Yamaha	80	(United States) Derek Drake	1–5, 8
Toyota Redlands BarX Yamaha	Yamaha	334	(Australia) Brad West	1–4, 8
Maxim Yamaha	Yamaha	82	(United States) Ryder Floyd	6
Progressive Insurance ECSTAR Suzuki	Suzuki	94	(Germany) Ken Roczen	10
Nelson Racing	Yamaha	112	(United States) Trevin Nelson	4–7
BC Granite and Marble Yamaha	Yamaha	127	(United States) Jake Bork	3
We1 Racing	KTM	133	(United States) Dominic DeSimone	1
Champion Tool Storage Geebo KMR KTM	KTM	146	(United States) Kevin Moranz	6–9
Rodbell Racing	Honda	148	(United States) Justin Rodbell	4–6, 10–11
PMX Racing Lainer USA Beta	Beta	153	(United States) Clayton Tucker	1–2, 8
Holle Racing	Kawasaki	161	(United States) Dalton Holle	7
Smith Racing	Suzuki	162	(United States) Whispern Smith	3, 7
Winland Racing	Yamaha	165	(United States) Jack Winland	4, 6–7, 9
Motocross Action Magazine	Yamaha	171	(United States) Josh Mosiman	1–2, 8
Team Next Level Racing	Honda	173	(United States) Hunter Schlosser	1–3, 6–7
BGR Enterprise	Yamaha	176	(United States) Brandon Green	7
Enloe Racing	Husqvarna	177	(United States) Ace Enloe	9
Trinity Motorsports	Kawasaki	178	(United States) Justin Kurtz	All
Tech Service Racing	Yamaha	181	(United States) Ashton Arruda	10–11
Tech Service Racing	Yamaha	777	(United States) James Harrington	3–6, 10
Grateful Ones MC/Roseville Motorsports/Denzin Racing	Yamaha	194	(United States) Derik Denzin	2
RPM KTM Racing Team	KTM	196	(Australia) Mason Semmens	1–2
McGinley Clinic Privateer Support Program	KTM	197	(United States) Brian Saunier	11
McGinley Clinic Privateer Support Program	Triumph	420	(United States) Jackson Gray	4–6, 8–11
McGinley Clinic Privateer Support Program	Yamaha	512	(United States) Austin Cozadd	5, 7–8, 10–11
IQ Racing Team	Honda	199	(United States) John Short	All
Beta Factory Racing	Beta	202	(United States) Dare DeMartile	2
Rocky Mountain/Red Bear Kawasaki	Kawasaki	206	(United States) Josh Toth	5
Motosport Hillsboro/Legacy Racewear Kawasaki	Kawasaki	207	(United States) Rider Fisher	8
	Yamaha	216	(United States) Grant Hoffman	9
Cody Walker Racing	Yamaha	221	(United States) Cody Walker	1–2
Factory Connection	Ducati	222	(Italy) Antonio Cairoli	6–7
MacDonald Racing	Yamaha	228	(United States) Shawn MacDonald	5
Ridezilla	Honda	231	(United States) Adam Conway	2
Club57 K2 Homes Racing	KTM	233	(United States) Joshua Boaz	1–4, 6–7
RMArmy Suzuki	Suzuki	238	(United States) Ben Robinson	5
Robs Performance	KTM	255	(United States) Jackson Oehlhof	7, 10
Robs Performance	Husqvarna	273	(United States) Max Mayer	7
SloJoe Racing	Honda	257	(United States) Joey Deneen	4
Honda of the Ozarks	Honda	266	(United States) Brett Greenley	4
FrederickTown Yamaha	Yamaha	268	(United States) Gage Stine	10–11
Grindstone	Husqvarna	276	(United States) Jaret Finch	2
Wyatt Mattson Racing	Yamaha	279	(United States) Wyatt Mattson	4
Carsten Racing	Suzuki	281	(United States) Cory Carsten	5–6, 9–11
Kirkland Racing Honda	Honda	291	(United States) Corey Kirkland	8
Dirt Surferz Co.	Honda	293	(United States) Blane Pickens	6, 10
Harrison Racing	Yamaha	297	(United States) Vincent Harrison	4–5
US 27 Motorsports	Beta	299	(United States) Konnor Visger	All
US 27 Motorsports	Kawasaki	535	(United States) Joey Crown	5–7, 9–10
Arma Sport/101 Bikes Yamaha Racing Team	Yamaha	305	(United States) Jack Saggau	1–2
306 Motorsports	Yamaha	306	(United States) Damon Strobel	1–3, 5–10
Moto Nation Kwikset Suzuki	Kawasaki	315	(United States) Cody Groves	4, 10–11
Ty Freehill Racing	Honda	316	(United States) Ty Freehill	8
Crotty Racing	Yamaha	318	(United States) Seth Crotty	8
Cooper Racing	Yamaha	324	(United States) Bo Cooper	7, 9
Panzarella Racing	Kawasaki	327	(United States) Alex Panzarella	5, 10
Smiles Limited Racing	Yamaha	329	(United States) Sebastian Toth	1–2, 8
	KTM	330	(United States) Trevor Paine	6, 10
	Kawasaki	331	(United States) Alex Lewis	10
Privateer Program	Kawasaki	333	(United States) Zane Klemz	3, 5–7, 9
ARACOM Racing	Husqvarna	344	(United States) Justin Aragaki	1–2
K&M Rebar Legacy Honda	Honda	349	(United States) Kile Epperson	4
Jack Rogers Racing	Kawasaki	351	(United States) Jack Rogers	10–11
Cornish Racing	Yamaha	356	(United States) Chris Cornish	7–8
110 Racing	KTM	366	(United States) Blaze Cremaldi	4
110 Racing	Honda	529	(United States) Brett Heidorn	4, 6, 9–11
McCauley Racing	Yamaha	367	(United States) Christian McCauley	4, 11
Welch Racing	Kawasaki	376	(United States) Thomas Welch	10–11
JRC3 Parts and Sales	Gas Gas	383	(United States) JR Churn III	10–11
Penwell Racing	Kawasaki	384	(United States) Cody Penwell	11
Raylentless Racing	Honda	388	(United States) Brandon Ray	All
Lennon Racing	KTM	394	(United States) Michael Lennon	11
Team Brown Racing	Gas Gas	398	(United States) Trevor Brown	5
Organic MX	KTM	398	(United States) Austin Goeken	9
Nich Cycling/Wilson Powersports Yamaha	Yamaha	401	(United States) Blake Gardner	7–11
MK Excavation Racing	Kawasaki	402	(United States) Matt Karwat	4–5, 11
Grgurich Racing	Yamaha	415	(United States) Brendan Grgurich	7
JWR Honda Racing	Honda	417	(Norway) Cornelius Tøndel	5–7
SC Sporthomes Husqvarna	Husqvarna	421	(South Africa) Tristan Purdon	1–2
SC Sporthomes Husqvarna	Husqvarna	591	(United Kingdom) Charlie Putnam	1–2
Cade Groen Racing	Gas Gas	423	(United States) Cade Groen	9, 11
	Kawasaki	433	(United States) Anthony Gonsalves	2
Mosites Motorsports	Kawasaki	437	(United States) Vinny Luhovey	4–6, 9–11
Big St Charles Motorsports	KTM	441	(United States) Zayden Mason	4–7, 9–10
Basco	Yamaha	444	(United States) Justin Cokinos	5
GDOGG Racing Yamaha	Yamaha	445	(United States) Noah Miesen	1–7, 9–11
TLJ Forever Two Wheels PCC Yamaha	Yamaha	450	(United States) Brad Burkhart	1–3, 8
Bonita Racing	KTM	452	(United States) Justin Bonita	2, 8
Trinity Motorsports	KTM	455	(United States) Kollin Lund	6–7, 9
Big Daddy Racing	KTM	459	(United States) Austin Brooks	5
	Kawasaki	467	(United States) Isaiah Goodman	3
Carls Towing/M9 Suspension Yamaha	Yamaha	480	(United States) Ashton Oudman	2, 8
Tuna Fish Racing	Yamaha	481	(United States) Jonah Schmidt	8
Noowell All Balls Racing EBR Yamaha	Yamaha	483	(United States) Bryton Carroll	4–7, 9–10
Randanella Racing	Kawasaki	488	(United States) Travis Randanella	4–5
Randanella Racing	Kawasaki	489	(United States) Ricci Randanella	4–5
Clinton Racing	Yamaha	496	(United States) KC Clinton	2–3
Paradise MX Race Team	Yamaha	498	(United States) Jason Dragonetti	5
Roth Racing	Yamaha	514	(United States) Anthony Roth	11
Clastic Designs	Kawasaki	517	(United States) Jimmy Hazel	2
Full Throttle Motorsports	Kawasaki	528	(United States) Ryan Peters	5, 8
Full Throttle Motorsports	Yamaha	546	(United States) Harris Huizenga	5, 7
MGR	Honda	531	(United States) Tyler Grall	7
Honda Canada GDR Fox Racing	Honda	533	(Canada) Dylan Wright	11
Jason Brooks Racing	Yamaha	534	(United States) Jason Brooks	5
Feine Tune Racing	Honda	536	(United States) Gavin Tilford	7–9
Jansen Racing	KTM	543	(United States) Taylor Jansen	3, 6–7, 9
Snirt Racing	Yamaha	544	(United States) Noah Willbrandt	4, 6–7, 9, 11
JB 552.0	KTM	552	(United States) Jeremy Byrne	1
	Kawasaki	555	(Brazil) Heberton Lima	10
FMF Red Bull KTM Off-Road Team	KTM	563	(United States) Dante Oliveira	2
Trinity Motorsports	KTM	566	(United States) Jacob Rose	4
Backyard Design Racing	KTM	570	(Germany) Robin Goldammer	11
Backyard Design Racing	Kawasaki	973	(Germany) Philipp Klakow	11
Jordan Isola Racing	Honda	571	(United States) Jordan Isola	1
CCR Racing	Yamaha	573	(United States) Christopher Blackmer	7, 9
Costanzos Off-Road	Yamaha	574	(United States) Ryan Lechien	4, 10
Red Bull KTM South Africa	KTM	584	(South Africa) Cameron Durow	1, 3–4, 6–11
Trinity Motorsports	Kawasaki	588	(United States) Eddie Norred	3–7, 9–11
Factory Moto Kids	Honda	618	(United States) Talon Gorman	2
	Yamaha	620	(United States) PJ Jackson	4
Trinity Motorsports	Yamaha	621	(United States) Bennett Mantooth	6–7, 9–11
FFPS Husqvarna	Triumph	630	(United States) Matt Jackson	10–11
Piazza Racing	Yamaha	637	(United States) Bobby Piazza	4, 11
Flora Racing	Honda	641	(United States) Tommy Flora Jr	8
Louds Racing	Gas Gas	655	(United States) Tyler Loud	10
GFR	Honda	662	(United States) Dean Gall	3, 6, 9–10
Allen Racing	Kawasaki	666	(United States) Collin Hinrichs	7, 9
Grassroots MX	Honda	670	(United States) Gavin Brough	1
NorCal PCP Motorsports	KTM	671	(United States) Tyler DuCray	1–2
TJ Squib Racing	Kawasaki	680	(United States) TJ Squib	4–6, 10
Pat McLam Racing	Yamaha	685	(United States) Pat McLam	8
Usko Racing	KTM	689	(United States) Tony Usko	11
Mobile Motorcycle Mechanic	KTM	691	(United States) Maliki Constantino	6–7, 9, 11
Racetech Titanium/Twisted Team	Kawasaki	693	(United States) Bryce McLaud	7, 9
Ace Motorcycles	Honda	700	(United Kingdom) Brad Todd	3, 7–10
Tom Zont Racing	Gas Gas	701	(United States) Kyle Kunstman	3, 6–7, 9
Mowry Racing	Husqvarna	703	(United States) Conner Mowry	11
DSI Racing	Yamaha	706	(United States) Gary Smith	9, 11
	KTM	707	(United States) Jacob Stevens	10
Powercurve MX	Yamaha	715	(United States) Ian Kearon	9, 11
Unleashed Tech Service Racing	Gas Gas	717	(United States) Billy Clark	10
AWOL Racing	Yamaha	721	(United States) Nathan Murphy	4–5, 11
Axcel Energy/Live Sent Ministries Kawasaki	Kawasaki	733	(United States) Steve Mages	6
Hebelers Motorsports	KTM	746	(United States) Trevor Schmidt	4, 10
Thomas Brothers Racing	KTM	747	(United States) Robbie Thomas	10–11
Revenant	Honda	766	(United States) Eric Rivera	1–2
Wharton Racing	Kawasaki	767	(United States) Mason Wharton	8
Shondeck Racing	Gas Gas	768	(United States) Cole Shondeck	11
Rossi SLS	KTM	769	(United States) Andrew Rossi	5
Morgan Racing	Yamaha	774	(United States) Hayden Morgan	9
	Yamaha	778	(United States) Tony Lorusso	5
Forsberg Racing	Yamaha	779	(United States) Chase Forsberg	2
HBI Racing	KTM	793	(United States) Michael Ashe	10–11
Platinum Powersports Yamaha	Yamaha	797	(United States) Karter Delong	10
AR Motorsport	Yamaha	799	(United States) Alex Reinke	4–7, 9–11
AJE Motorsports Gas Gas	Gas Gas	800	(Canada) Preston Masciangelo	6, 9, 11
Macintyre Racing	Kawasaki	802	(United States) Marshall Macintyre	5
Lojaks Cycles	Yamaha	808	(United States) Zach Gareis	4, 6, 9–11
Sorensen Racing	Honda	814	(United States) Deven Sorensen	5
Ronnie Snyder Racing	Kawasaki	818	(United States) Ronnie Snyder	11
Ripper 822	Husqvarna	822	(United States) Riley Ripper	1–3
Profast	KTM	831	(United States) Jacob Glenn	5, 10–11
Klim/Edelmanns/Walker Property Services Racing	KTM	834	(United States) Kris Corey	5
Lords Racing	Yamaha	835	(United States) Conner Lords	1–3, 6, 8
Walker Motorsports	KTM	841	(United States) Jeff Walker	4–6
Moto Rising	Yamaha	851	(United States) Neal Allen	8
Tech Service Racing	Yamaha	856	(United States) Scott Iverson	5, 10
Eslinger Custom Homes Racing	KTM	859	(United States) Ethan Eslinger	9
Kyle Petrie Racing	Kawasaki	860	(United States) Kyle Petrie	6, 9
Williams Racing	Honda	874	(United States) Zack Williams	7–11
Team Yosemite Fire and Security	Yamaha	877	(United States) Anthony Castaneda	1
Team 887	Honda	887	(United States) Shane Kelleher	5
Team BWR	Honda	902	(United States) Schae Thomas	11
Biese Brothers Racing	Kawasaki	911	(United States) Jordan Biese	6–7, 9
MVMT Company/3 Seas Recreation Beta	Beta	912	(United States) Bryn Steffan	4
	Yamaha	921	(United States) Gavin Brumfield	4, 6, 9
Moriarty Racing	Yamaha	933	(United States) Dylan Moriarty	4–5, 11
Trinity Motorsports	Yamaha	940	(United States) Evan Talbott	4, 9–11
Shindel Racing	KTM	955	(United States) Jayden Shindel	4, 11
	Kawasaki	960	(United States) Bryce Walborn	10
Olson Racing	Yamaha	982	(United States) Skylar Olson	3
Gavin Mays Racing	KTM	988	(United States) Gavin Mays	4, 9–10
Eastside Dogs	Yamaha	993	(United States) Jake Rassa	4, 11
Jimmy Hebert Racing	Gas Gas	997	(United States) Jimmy Hebert	5

=== Riders Championship ===
Pos	Rider	Bike	FOX (California)		HAN (California)		THU (Colorado)		HIG (Pennsylvania)		SOU (Massachusetts)		RED (Michigan)		SPR (Minnesota)		WAS (Washington (state))		IRN (Indiana)		UNA (New York (state))		BUD (Maryland)		Points
1	(Australia) Jett Lawrence	Honda	1	1	3	1	1	1	1	3	1	1	1	1	2	1	3	1	17	1	1	1	1	2	509
2	(Australia) Hunter Lawrence	Honda	3	4	5	4	4	4	2	2	2	2	2	3	1	2	5	4	2	2	2	2	3	1	454
3	(United States) Eli Tomac	Yamaha	4	2	1	9	3	2	5	1	3	3	Ret	7	6	9	2	3	6	3	3	3	5	8	395
4	(United States) Justin Cooper	Yamaha	2	8	4	2	5	3	4	5	6	5	4	2	5	13	6	5	4	5	6	4	2	4	389
5	(United States) RJ Hampshire	Husqvarna	6	12	6	8	6	7	6	8	8	4	3	6	4	4	4	6	3	4	4	5	4	3	366
6	(Spain) Jorge Prado	Kawasaki	7	6	12	5	8	Ret	12	23	5	6	7	5	12	5	8	19	5	6	15	12	11	12	262
7	(United States) Malcolm Stewart	Husqvarna	12	Ret	8	10	10	10	Ret	DNS	12	10	11	10	7	8	16	8	9	7	10	7	7	6	240
8	(United States) Aaron Plessinger	KTM	5	3	2	3	2	5	3	4	4	8	6	DNS	Ret	DNS									204
9	(Switzerland) Valentin Guillod	Yamaha	10	13	15	20	14	8	17	13	16	15	17	Ret	10	6	9	10	14	11	11	10	12	10	201
10	(United States) Justin Barcia	Gas Gas									10	9	8	9	8	7	7	7	8	9	9	8	8	5	196
11	(United States) Coty Schock	Yamaha	15	Ret	11	12	11	20	10	9	18	12	13	Ret	9	11	23	16	11	10	12	11	9	15	183
12	(Estonia) Harri Kullas	Husqvarna	16	21	20	21	15	12	16	18	9	13	12	11	13	14	11	12	12	13	20	DNS	14	11	158
13	(United States) Cooper Webb	Yamaha	Ret	7	7	7	7	6	9	11	7	7	15	8											151
14	(United States) Chase Sexton	KTM	Ret	DNS									5	4	3	3	1	2	1	Ret					147
15	(France) Benoît Paturel	Suzuki	11	9	13	14	30	Ret	11	10	14	14	14	12	16	Ret	28	Ret	13	19	16	13	24	Ret	131
16	(United States) Mitchell Harrison	Kawasaki	Ret	Ret	25	18	18	14	14	14	19	19	19	14	18	16	10	11	10	15	14	14	10	Ret	129
17	(United States) Joey Savatgy	Honda	8	10	10	11	9	16	8	6	13	11	16	Ret											124
18	(Venezuela) Lorenzo Locurcio	Gas Gas	19	Ret	17	15			21	20	15	16	22	15	11	12	13	14	16	12	13	15	15	16	121
19	(United States) Jason Anderson	Kawasaki	9	5	9	6	12	Ret	7	7	Ret	Ret	10	Ret											111
20	(France) Dylan Ferrandis	Honda																	7	8	7	6	6	7	91
21	(United States) Colt Nichols	Suzuki	13	Ret	19	13	Ret	9	13	12	Ret	Ret	29	Ret	15	15	12	9							90
22	(France) Romain Pape	Yamaha	23	15	23	25	16	17	19	Ret	24	Ret	18	16	24	19	19	13	Ret	18	17	19	22	17	63
23	(United States) Grant Harlan	Yamaha	14	11	14	Ret			15	16	17	17	Ret	DNS											50
24	(United States) Marshal Weltin	Yamaha											26	17	26	17	15	15	18	14	Ret	17	28	13	50
25	(United States) Henry Miller	Yamaha											Ret	13	14	18	14	Ret	15	16	18	20	23	25	48
26	(Australia) Kyle Webster	Honda																	19	DNS	8	9	20	9	45
27	(United States) John Short	Honda	34	30	24	23	20	19	Ret	27	DNQ	DNQ	20	19	22	Ret	31	18	25	Ret	21	18	19	14	30
28	(United States) Derek Kelley	Yamaha	30	16	16	16	21	15	22	29	23	18	DNQ	DNQ											30
29	(United States) Shane McElrath	Honda																	20	17	19	16	13	18	29
30	(Italy) Tony Cairoli	Ducati											9	Ret	23	10									25
31	(United States) Derek Drake	Yamaha	17	14	Ret	Ret	Ret	11	28	Ret	Ret	22					Ret	DNS							24
32	(Sweden) Fredrik Norén	Kawasaki	21	17	18	17	29	Ret	18	17	DNQ	DNQ													24
33	(Denmark) Matti Jørgensen	Husqvarna	33	28	31	28	Ret	DNS	DNQ	25	21	24	Ret	18	19	20	30	25	22	20	DNQ	32	17	19	20
34	(United States) Bryce Shelly	Yamaha	20	19	27	Ret	Ret	18	Ret	24	22	20	23	28	20	21	20	20	31	31	23	21	21	34	20
35	(Norway) Cornelius Tøndel	Honda									11	Ret	Ret	20	17	Ret									18
36	(United States) Benny Bloss	Beta			22	Ret	13	13	30	Ret															18
37	(Germany) Ken Roczen	Suzuki																			5	Ret			17
38	(United States) Jeremy Hand	Honda							20	21			25	31	21	23	17	35	23	27	22	25	16	22	15
39	(France) Scotty Verhaeghe	Yamaha	27	Ret	30	31	17	22	29	22	27	Ret	21	22	25	22	24	21	21	21	25	22	29	23	9
40	(Australia) Mason Semmens	KTM	18	18	21	26																			9
41	(United States) Bryson Gardner	Beta			33	24	24	23	24	15															7
42	(United States) Max Miller	Yamaha	22	Ret	Ret	Ret	Ret	24																	7
42	(United States) Max Miller	Kawasaki											DNQ	DNQ	Ret	Ret	21	17	24	33	27	23	30	21	7
43	(Australia) Brad West	Yamaha	25	22	Ret	29	DNS	DNS	Ret	19							18	Ret							7
44	(United States) Jack Rogers	Kawasaki																			29	28	18	29	4
45	(United States) Tyler Stepek	Yamaha	29	26	26	33	19	21	26	Ret	DNQ	DNQ	30	32											4
46	(United States) Dante Oliveira	KTM			28	19																			3
47	(United States) James Harrington	Yamaha					25	30	DNQ	DNQ	20	Ret	DNQ	DNQ							DNQ	DNQ			2
48	(United States) Justin Rodbell	Honda							32	26	DNQ	DNQ	32	33							35	36	26	20	2
49	(Italy) Nicholas Lapucci	Kawasaki	Ret	20																					2
50	(United States) Ryder Floyd	Yamaha											24	21											1
51	(United States) Justin Cokinos	Yamaha									29	21													1
	(United States) Brandon Ray	Honda	32	23	34	Ret	22	Ret	35	28	Ret	29	DNQ	DNQ	32	30	22	22	Ret	38	DNS	DNS	25	Ret	0
	(United States) Logan Leitzel	Kawasaki					27	27	DNQ	30	DNQ	DNQ	DNQ	DNQ	33	33			33	22	37	35	33	30	0
	(United States) Dare DeMartile	Beta			32	22																			0
	(United States) Vinny Luhovey	Kawasaki							23	Ret	DNQ	DNQ	28	23					26	25	26	24	27	26	0
	(South Africa) Cameron Durow	KTM	26	25			26	26	DNQ	DNQ			DNQ	DNQ	28	24	27	24	27	23	30	33	32	28	0
	(United States) Cade Clason	Kawasaki							25	Ret			27	25	35	Ret	33	23							0
	(United States) Joshua Boaz	KTM	31	29	36	27	23	25	34	31			DNQ	29	34	28									0
	(United States) Mike Witkowski	Honda									31	23													0
	(United States) Blake Gardner	Yamaha													29	27	29	29	Ret	24	28	26	34	24	0
	(South Africa) Tristan Purdon	Husqvarna	24	24	29	Ret																			0
	(United States) Trevin Nelson	Yamaha							33	34	DNQ	DNQ	Ret	24	27	25									0
	(United States) Bryton Carroll	Yamaha							27	33	DNQ	DNQ	DNQ	26	DNQ	DNQ			36	35	24	Ret			0
	(United States) Josh Toth	Kawasaki									25	26													0
	(United States) Zack Williams	Honda													31	29	25	27	32	29	33	31	36	31	0
	(United States) Ricci Randanella	Kawasaki							31	32	28	25													0
	(United States) Joey Crown	Kawasaki									26	27	31	30	37	26			30	26	38	37			0
	(United States) Kevin Moranz	KTM											33	27	30	Ret	26	26	28	28					0
	(United Kingdom) Brad Todd	Honda					28	31							36	31	34	34	Ret	32	31	27			0
	(United States) Gage Stine	Yamaha																			36	29	31	27	0
	(Venezuela) Daniel Bortolín	Gas Gas	36	27	DNQ	DNQ																			0
	(United States) Josh Mosiman	Yamaha	28	Ret	35	30											32	32							0
	(United States) Hunter Schlosser	Honda	35	31	DNQ	DNQ	31	28					DNQ	DNQ	38	Ret									0
	(United States) Cory Carsten	Suzuki									32	28	DNQ	DNQ					DNQ	DNQ	DNQ	DNQ	38	33	0
	(United States) Clayton Tucker	Beta	DNQ	DNQ	37	32											Ret	28							0
	(Canada) Preston Masciangelo	Gas Gas											DNQ	DNQ					29	30			35	Ret	0
	(United States) Conner Lords	Yamaha	DNQ	DNQ	DNQ	DNQ	32	29					DNQ	DNQ			DNQ	DNQ							0
	(United States) Ashton Arruda	Yamaha																			32	30	DNQ	DNQ	0
	(United States) Kris Corey	KTM									33	30													0
	(United States) Ashton Oudman	Yamaha			DNQ	DNQ											36	30							0
	(United States) Jason Brooks	Yamaha									30	Ret													0
	(United States) Deven Sorensen	Honda									34	31													0
	(United States) Ty Freehill	Honda															37	31							0
	(United States) Cody Groves	Kawasaki							DNQ	DNQ											34	34	37	32	0
	(United States) Christopher Blackmer	Yamaha													DNQ	32			34	36					0
	(United States) Marshall Macintyre	Kawasaki									35	32													0
	(United States) Gavin Brough	Honda	DNQ	32																					0
	(United States) Eddie Norred	Kawasaki					DNQ	32	DNQ	DNQ	DNQ	DNQ	DNQ	DNQ	DNQ	DNQ			DNQ	DNQ	DNQ	DNQ	DNQ	DNQ	0
	(United States) Damon Strobel	Yamaha	DNQ	DNQ	DNQ	DNQ	35	33			DNQ	DNQ	DNQ	DNQ	DNQ	DNQ	DNQ	DNQ	DNQ	DNQ	DNQ	DNQ			0
	(United States) Whispern Smith	Suzuki					33	Ret							DNQ	DNQ									0
	(United States) Konnor Visger	Beta	DNQ	DNQ	DNQ	DNQ	DNQ	DNQ	DNQ	DNQ	DNQ	DNQ	DNQ	DNQ	DNQ	DNQ	DNQ	33	DNQ	DNQ	DNQ	DNQ	DNQ	DNQ	0
	(United States) Dean Gall	Honda					34	34					DNQ	DNQ					DNQ	DNQ	DNQ	DNQ			0
	(United States) Jackson Gray	Triumph							DNQ	DNQ	DNQ	DNQ	DNQ	DNQ			38	36	DNQ	34	DNQ	DNQ	39	36	0
	(United States) Zayden Mason	KTM							DNQ	DNQ	DNQ	DNQ	DNQ	DNQ	DNQ	DNQ			35	37	DNQ	DNQ			0
	(United States) Thomas Welch	Kawasaki																			DNQ	DNQ	40	35	0
	(Sweden) Anton Nordström	Husqvarna															35	Ret							0
	(United States) Austin Cozadd	Yamaha									DNQ	DNQ			DNQ	DNQ	DNQ	DNQ			DNQ	DNQ	41	37	0
	(United States) Trevor Schmidt	KTM							DNQ	DNQ											Ret	Ret			0
	(Netherlands) Kevin Buitenhuis	Yamaha									Ret	Ret													0
	(Venezuela) Anthony Rodríguez	KTM											Ret	Ret											0
	(United States) Jeff Walker	KTM							Ret	DNS	DNQ	DNQ	DNQ	DNQ											0
	(Canada) Dylan Wright	Honda																					DNS	DNS	0
	(United States) Justin Kurtz	Kawasaki	DNQ	DNQ	DNQ	DNQ	DNQ	DNQ	DNQ	DNQ	DNQ	DNQ	DNQ	DNQ	DNQ	DNQ	DNQ	DNQ	DNQ	DNQ	DNQ	DNQ	DNQ	DNQ	0
	(United States) Brayden Gibson	Husqvarna	DNQ	DNQ	DNQ	DNQ	DNQ	DNQ	DNQ	DNQ	DNQ	DNQ	DNQ	DNQ	DNQ	DNQ	DNQ	DNQ	DNQ	DNQ	DNQ	DNQ	DNQ	DNQ	0
	(United States) Noah Miesen	Yamaha	DNQ	DNQ	DNQ	DNQ	DNQ	DNQ	DNQ	DNQ	DNQ	DNQ	DNQ	DNQ	DNQ	DNQ			DNQ	DNQ	DNQ	DNQ	DNQ	DNQ	0
	(United States) Alex Reinke	Yamaha							DNQ	DNQ	DNQ	DNQ	DNQ	DNQ	DNQ	DNQ			DNQ	DNQ	DNQ	DNQ	DNQ	DNQ	0
	(United States) Zane Klemz	Kawasaki					DNQ	DNQ			DNQ	DNQ	DNQ	DNQ	DNQ	DNQ			DNQ	DNQ					0
	(United States) Noah Willbrandt	Yamaha							DNQ	DNQ			DNQ	DNQ	DNQ	DNQ			DNQ	DNQ			DNQ	DNQ	0
	(United States) Zach Gareis	Yamaha							DNQ	DNQ			DNQ	DNQ					DNQ	DNQ	DNQ	DNQ	DNQ	DNQ	0
	(United States) Brett Heidorn	Honda							DNQ	DNQ			DNQ	DNQ					DNQ	DNQ	DNQ	DNQ	DNQ	DNQ	0
	(United States) Bennett Mantooth	Yamaha											DNQ	DNQ	DNQ	DNQ			DNQ	DNQ	DNQ	DNQ	DNQ	DNQ	0
	(United States) Brad Burkhart	Yamaha	DNQ	DNQ	DNQ	DNQ	DNQ	DNQ									DNQ	DNQ							0
	(United States) Kyle Kunstman	Gas Gas					DNQ	DNQ					DNQ	DNQ	DNQ	DNQ			DNQ	DNQ					0
	(United States) Taylor Jansen	KTM					DNQ	DNQ					DNQ	DNQ	DNQ	DNQ			DNQ	DNQ					0
	(United States) TJ Squib	Kawasaki							DNQ	DNQ	DNQ	DNQ	DNQ	DNQ							DNQ	DNQ			0
	(United States) Jack Winland	Yamaha							DNQ	DNQ			DNQ	DNQ	DNQ	DNQ			DNQ	DNQ					0
	(United States) Evan Talbott	Yamaha							DNQ	DNQ									DNQ	DNQ	DNQ	DNQ	DNQ	DNQ	0
	(United States) Maliki Constantino	KTM											DNQ	DNQ	DNQ	DNQ			DNQ	DNQ			DNQ	DNQ	0
	(United States) Riley Ripper	Husqvarna	DNQ	DNQ	DNQ	DNQ	DNQ	DNQ																	0
	(United States) Sebastian Toth	Yamaha	DNQ	DNQ	DNQ	DNQ											DNQ	DNQ							0
	(United States) Nathan Murphy	Yamaha							DNQ	DNQ	DNQ	DNQ											DNQ	DNQ	0
	(United States) Matt Karwat	Kawasaki							DNQ	DNQ	DNQ	DNQ											DNQ	DNQ	0
	(United States) Dylan Moriarty	Yamaha							DNQ	DNQ	DNQ	DNQ											DNQ	DNQ	0
	(United States) Gavin Brumfield	Yamaha							DNQ	DNQ			DNQ	DNQ					DNQ	DNQ					0
	(United States) Gavin Mays	KTM							DNQ	DNQ									DNQ	DNQ	DNQ	DNQ			0
	(United States) Jacob Glenn	KTM									DNQ	DNQ									DNQ	DNQ	DNQ	DNQ	0
	(United States) Jordan Biese	Kawasaki											DNQ	DNQ	DNQ	DNQ			DNQ	DNQ					0
	(United States) Kollin Lund	KTM											DNQ	DNQ	DNQ	DNQ			DNQ	DNQ					0
	(United States) Gavin Tilford	Honda													DNQ	DNQ	DNQ	DNQ	DNQ	DNQ					0
	(United Kingdom) Charlie Putnam	Husqvarna	DNQ	DNQ	DNQ	DNQ																			0
	(United States) Cody Walker	Yamaha	DNQ	DNQ	DNQ	DNQ																			0
	(United States) Justin Aragaki	Husqvarna	DNQ	DNQ	DNQ	DNQ																			0
	(United States) Tyler DuCray	KTM	DNQ	DNQ	DNQ	DNQ																			0
	(United States) Jack Saggau	Yamaha	DNQ	DNQ	DNQ	DNQ																			0
	(United States) Eric Rivera	Honda	DNQ	DNQ	DNQ	DNQ																			0
	(United States) KC Clinton	Yamaha			DNQ	DNQ	DNQ	DNQ																	0
	(United States) Justin Bonita	KTM			DNQ	DNQ											DNQ	DNQ							0
	(United States) Travis Randanella	Kawasaki							DNQ	DNQ	DNQ	DNQ													0
	(United States) Vincent Harrison	Yamaha							DNQ	DNQ	DNQ	DNQ													0
	(United States) Ryan Lechien	Yamaha							DNQ	DNQ											DNQ	DNQ			0
	(United States) Jake Rassa	Yamaha							DNQ	DNQ													DNQ	DNQ	0
	(United States) Christian McCauley	Yamaha							DNQ	DNQ													DNQ	DNQ	0
	(United States) Bobby Piazza	Yamaha							DNQ	DNQ													DNQ	DNQ	0
	(United States) Jayden Shindel	KTM							DNQ	DNQ													DNQ	DNQ	0
	(United States) Harris Huizenga	Husqvarna									DNQ	DNQ			DNQ	DNQ									0
	(United States) Ryan Peters	Kawasaki									DNQ	DNQ					DNQ	DNQ							0
	(United States) Alex Panzarella	Kawasaki									DNQ	DNQ									DNQ	DNQ			0
	(United States) Scott Iverson	Yamaha									DNQ	DNQ									DNQ	DNQ			0
	(United States) Kyle Petrie	Kawasaki											DNQ	DNQ					DNQ	DNQ					0
	(United States) Trevor Paine	KTM											DNQ	DNQ							DNQ	DNQ			0
	(United States) Blane Pickens	Honda											DNQ	DNQ							DNQ	DNQ			0
	(United States) Chris Cornish	Yamaha													DNQ	DNQ	DNQ	DNQ							0
	(United States) Collin Hinrichs	Kawasaki													DNQ	DNQ			DNQ	DNQ					0
	(United States) Bryce McLaud	Kawasaki													DNQ	DNQ			DNQ	DNQ					0
	(United States) Bo Cooper	Yamaha													DNQ	DNQ			DNQ	DNQ					0
	(United States) Jackson Oehlhof	KTM													DNQ	DNQ					DNQ	DNQ			0
	(United States) Cade Groen	Gas Gas																	DNQ	DNQ			DNQ	DNQ	0
	(United States) Gary Smith	Yamaha																	DNQ	DNQ			DNQ	DNQ	0
	(United States) Ian Kearon	Yamaha																	DNQ	DNQ			DNQ	DNQ	0
	(United States) Michael Ashe	KTM																			DNQ	DNQ	DNQ	DNQ	0
	(United States) Robbie Thomas	KTM																			DNQ	DNQ	DNQ	DNQ	0
	(United States) Matt Jackson	Triumph																			DNQ	DNQ	DNQ	DNQ	0
	(United States) JR Churn III	Gas Gas																			DNQ	DNQ	DNQ	DNQ	0
	(United States) Dominic DeSimone	KTM	DNQ	DNQ																					0
	(United States) Anthony Castaneda	Yamaha	DNQ	DNQ																					0
	(United States) Jeremy Byrne	KTM	DNQ	DNQ																					0
	(United States) Jordan Isola	Honda	DNQ	DNQ																					0
	(United States) Jaret Finch	Husqvarna			DNQ	DNQ																			0
	(United States) Jimmy Hazel	Kawasaki			DNQ	DNQ																			0
	(United States) Talon Gorman	Honda			DNQ	DNQ																			0
	(United States) Anthony Gonsalves	Kawasaki			DNQ	DNQ																			0
	(United States) Derik Denzin	Yamaha			DNQ	DNQ																			0
	(United States) Chase Forsberg	Yamaha			DNQ	DNQ																			0
	(United States) Adam Conway	Honda			DNQ	DNQ																			0
	(United States) Jake Bork	Yamaha					DNQ	DNQ																	0
	(United States) Isaiah Goodman	Kawasaki					DNQ	DNQ																	0
	(United States) Skylar Olson	Yamaha					DNQ	DNQ																	0
	(United States) Wyatt Mattson	Yamaha							DNQ	DNQ															0
	(United States) Kile Epperson	Honda							DNQ	DNQ															0
	(United States) PJ Jackson	Yamaha							DNQ	DNQ															0
	(United States) Brett Greenley	Honda							DNQ	DNQ															0
	(United States) Blaze Cremaldi	KTM							DNQ	DNQ															0
	(United States) Bryn Steffan	Beta							DNQ	DNQ															0
	(United States) Joey Deneen	Honda							DNQ	DNQ															0
	(United States) Jacob Rose	KTM							DNQ	DNQ															0
	(United States) Tony Lorusso	Yamaha									DNQ	DNQ													0
	(United States) Jason Dragonetti	Yamaha									DNQ	DNQ													0
	(United States) Shane Kelleher	Honda									DNQ	DNQ													0
	(United States) Andrew Rossi	KTM									DNQ	DNQ													0
	(United States) Trevor Brown	Gas Gas									DNQ	DNQ													0
	(United States) Austin Brooks	KTM									DNQ	DNQ													0
	(United States) Ben Robinson	Suzuki									DNQ	DNQ													0
	(United States) Shawn MacDonald	Yamaha									DNQ	DNQ													0
	(United States) Jimmy Hebert	Gas Gas									DNQ	DNQ													0
	(United States) Steve Mages	Kawasaki											DNQ	DNQ											0
	(United States) Brandon Green	Yamaha													DNQ	DNQ									0
	(United States) Tayler Grall	Honda													DNQ	DNQ									0
	(United States) Brendan Grgurich	Yamaha													DNQ	DNQ									0
	(United States) Max Mayer	Husqvarna													DNQ	DNQ									0
	(United States) Dalton Holle	Kawasaki													DNQ	DNQ									0
	(United States) Seth Crotty	Yamaha															DNQ	DNQ							0
	(United States) Corey Kirkland	Honda															DNQ	DNQ							0
	(United States) Mason Wharton	Kawasaki															DNQ	DNQ							0
	(United States) Tommy Flora Jr	Honda															DNQ	DNQ							0
	(United States) Rider Fisher	Kawasaki															DNQ	DNQ							0
	(United States) Neal Allen	Yamaha															DNQ	DNQ							0
	(United States) Pat McLam	Yamaha															DNQ	DNQ							0
	(United States) Jonah Schmidt	Yamaha															DNQ	DNQ							0
	(United States) Ace Enloe	Husqvarna																	DNQ	DNQ					0
	(United States) Ethan Eslinger	KTM																	DNQ	DNQ					0
	(United States) Grant Hoffman	Yamaha																	DNQ	DNQ					0
	(United States) Austin Goeken	KTM																	DNQ	DNQ					0
	(United States) Hayden Morgan	Yamaha																	DNQ	DNQ					0
	(United States) Karter Delong	Yamaha																			DNQ	DNQ			0
	(United States) Tyler Loud	Gas Gas																			DNQ	DNQ			0
	(United States) Jacob Stevens	KTM																			DNQ	DNQ			0
	(United States) Bryce Walborn	Kawasaki																			DNQ	DNQ			0
	(United States) Alex Lewis	Kawasaki																			DNQ	DNQ			0
	(United States) Billy Clark	Gas Gas																			DNQ	DNQ			0
	(Brazil) Heberton Lima	Kawasaki																			DNQ	DNQ			0
	(United States) Conner Mowry	Husqvarna																					DNQ	DNQ	0
	(United States) Cody Penwell	Kawasaki																					DNQ	DNQ	0
	(Germany) Robin Goldammer	KTM																					DNQ	DNQ	0
	(United States) Schae Thomas	Honda																					DNQ	DNQ	0
	(United States) Cole Shondeck	Gas Gas																					DNQ	DNQ	0
	(United States) Ronnie Snyder	Kawasaki																					DNQ	DNQ	0
	(United States) Tony Usko	KTM																					DNQ	DNQ	0
	(United States) Michael Lennon	KTM																					DNQ	DNQ	0
	(United States) Anthony Roth	Yamaha																					DNQ	DNQ	0
	(Germany) Philipp Klakow	Kawasaki																					DNQ	DNQ	0
	(United States) Brian Saunier	KTM																					DNQ	DNQ	0
Pos	Rider	Bike	FOX (California)		HAN (California)		THU (Colorado)		HIG (Pennsylvania)		SOU (Massachusetts)		RED (Michigan)		SPR (Minnesota)		WAS (Washington (state))		IRN (Indiana)		UNA (New York (state))		BUD (Maryland)		Points

== 250cc ==
=== Entry list ===
Team	Constructor	No	Rider	Rounds
Monster Energy Star Racing Yamaha	Yamaha	1	(United States) Haiden Deegan	All
Monster Energy Star Racing Yamaha	Yamaha	6	(United States) Jeremy Martin	1–2, 7
Monster Energy Star Racing Yamaha	Yamaha	20	(United States) Pierce Brown	9
Monster Energy Star Racing Yamaha	Yamaha	34	(United States) Daxton Bennick	9–11
Monster Energy Star Racing Yamaha	Yamaha	41	(United States) Nate Thrasher	All
Monster Energy Star Racing Yamaha	Yamaha	93	(United States) Michael Mosiman	1–10
Monster Energy Star Racing Yamaha	Yamaha	100	(New Zealand) Cole Davies	10–11
Monster Energy Star Racing Yamaha	Yamaha	106	(Australia) Kayden Minear	3–4
Monster Energy Star Racing Yamaha	Yamaha	400	(United States) Caden Dudney	10–11
Honda HRC Progressive	Honda	10	(United States) Chance Hymas	1–4
Honda HRC Progressive	Honda	30	(Japan) Jo Shimoda	All
Red Bull KTM Factory Racing	KTM	16	(France) Tom Vialle	1–7, 9–11
Red Bull KTM Factory Racing	KTM	23	(United States) Julien Beaumer	1–6, 9–11
Triumph Factory Racing Team	Triumph	19	(United States) Jordon Smith	All
Triumph Factory Racing Team	Triumph	22	(United States) Jalek Swoll	4–9
Triumph Factory Racing Team	Triumph	83	(United States) Austin Forkner	All
Triumph Factory Racing Team	Triumph	107	(Denmark) Mikkel Haarup	1–10
Triumph Factory Racing Team	Triumph	325	(United States) Stilez Robertson	1
Rockstar Energy GASGAS Factory Racing	Gas Gas	25	(United States) Ryder DiFrancesco	All
Rockstar Energy GASGAS Factory Racing	Gas Gas	40	(United States) Casey Cochran	1–5
Monster Energy Pro Circuit Kawasaki	Kawasaki	26	(United States) Ty Masterpool	1–5, 10–11
Monster Energy Pro Circuit Kawasaki	Kawasaki	36	(United States) Garrett Marchbanks	All
Monster Energy Pro Circuit Kawasaki	Kawasaki	47	(United States) Levi Kitchen	All
Monster Energy Pro Circuit Kawasaki	Kawasaki	56	(United States) Seth Hammaker	1–2, 4–11
Monster Energy Pro Circuit Kawasaki	Kawasaki	98	(United States) Drew Adams	1–4, 6–11
Phoenix Racing Honda	Honda	39	(United States) Nicholas Romano	1
Phoenix Racing Honda	Honda	59	(United States) Cullin Park	8–11
Phoenix Racing Honda	Honda	91	(United States) TJ Albright	5–8, 10
Phoenix Racing Honda	Honda	115	(United States) Gavin Towers	1–4
Toyota Redlands BarX Yamaha	Yamaha	44	(United States) Dilan Schwartz	All
Toyota Redlands BarX Yamaha	Yamaha	302	(United States) Parker Ross	All
Toyota Redlands BarX Yamaha	Yamaha	443	(United States) Cole Timboe	1–4, 6–9
Muc-Off FXR ClubMX Yamaha Racing	Yamaha	54	(United States) Jett Reynolds	9
Muc-Off FXR ClubMX Yamaha Racing	Yamaha	92	(United States) Maximus Vohland	All
Muc-Off FXR ClubMX Yamaha Racing	Yamaha	186	(Australia) Reid Taylor	4, 9–10
Muc-Off FXR ClubMX Yamaha Racing	Yamaha	784	(United States) Alexander Fedortsov	1–8
Partzilla Blaster Power PRMX Kawasaki	Kawasaki	62	(United States) Mark Fineis	1
Partzilla Blaster Power PRMX Kawasaki	Kawasaki	63	(United States) Hunter Yoder	1–4, 10–11
Partzilla Blaster Power PRMX Kawasaki	Kawasaki	192	(United States) Jack Chambers	1–10
TiLube Honda	Honda	62	(United States) Mark Fineis	4–9
TiLube Honda	Honda	82	(United States) Ryder Floyd	1
TiLube Honda	Honda	89	(United States) Trevor Colip	1–2
TiLube Honda	Honda	235	(United States) Patrick Murphy	All
TiLube Honda	Honda	682	(United States) Izaih Clark	6–11
AEO Powersports KTM Racing Team	KTM	65	(United States) Lux Turner	All
AEO Powersports KTM Racing Team	KTM	134	(United States) Avery Long	All
AEO Powersports KTM Racing Team	KTM	775	(United States) CJ Benard	All
The Dirt Bike Depot WMR KTM	KTM	75	(United States) Gage Linville	4–6, 9–10
The Dirt Bike Depot WMR KTM	KTM	105	(South Africa) Marcus Phelps	10–11
The Dirt Bike Depot WMR KTM	KTM	142	(United States) Crockett Myers	1–3, 9–11
The Dirt Bike Depot WMR KTM	KTM	511	(United States) Jace Kessler	4–7, 9–11
Oak Hill Training Facility	Yamaha	82	(United States) Ryder Floyd	3
Host Grindstone Friesen Group	Kawasaki	85	(United States) Maxwell Sanford	1, 4–5, 11
MRPSBR Husqvarna Racing	Husqvarna	99	(United States) Brock Bennett	1–6, 8–11
MRPSBR Husqvarna Racing	Husqvarna	155	(United States) Dylan Cunha	All
MRPSBR Husqvarna Racing	Husqvarna	401	(United States) Blake Gardner	1–2
MRPSBR Husqvarna Racing	Husqvarna	734	(United States) Dayton Briggs	1–6
MRPSBR Husqvarna Racing	Husqvarna	805	(United States) Slade Varola	1–2
The McGinley Clinic Privateer Support Program	KTM	104	(South Africa) Barend Du Toit	1–4, 6–8
The McGinley Clinic Privateer Support Program	KTM	197	(United States) Brian Saunier	4–6
The McGinley Clinic Privateer Support Program	Honda	251	(United States) Kyle Czworkowski	4–7, 9–11
Fortin Racing	KTM	111	(United States) Larry Fortin	4
Privateer Paddock	Yamaha	113	(United States) Braden Spangle	8
HBI Racing	KTM	137	(United States) Ayden Shive	4, 7, 9–11
HBI Racing	Kawasaki	518	(United States) Matthew Mowery	4–11
3D Racing KTM	KTM	140	(United States) Russell Buccheri	4–7, 9–11
Gizmo Mods Rock River Yamaha Racing	Yamaha	143	(United States) Jaxen Driskell	1–2
Gizmo Mods Rock River Yamaha Racing	Yamaha	378	(United States) Kyle Wise	All
Gizmo Mods Rock River Yamaha Racing	Yamaha	900	(United States) Keegan Rowley	4–7
Bon Air Exteriors Racing	Yamaha	151	(United States) Aidan Dickens	1–8
J4 Racing	Yamaha	164	(United States) Evan Johnson	4, 11
PeeWeecycle.com PW50 Parts	Gas Gas	168	(United States) Cale Kuchnicki	9, 11
Hoover Racing	Yamaha	172	(United States) Hayden Hoover	4–6, 9, 11
Enloe Racing	Husqvarna	177	(United States) Ace Enloe	7
Arruda Racing	Yamaha	181	(United States) Ashton Arruda	5
Zaremba Racing	Yamaha	183	(United States) Mitchell Zaremba	11
Wildcat Race Team	Gas Gas	188	(United States) Hamden Hudson	All
Gwynn Racing	Kawasaki	190	(United States) Ryder Gwynn	6–7
Mainquist Racing	KTM	191	(United States) Carson Mainquist	All
SPR	Honda	195	(United States) Lance Kobusch	1–7
The Dirt Bike Depot Racing	Yamaha	198	(United States) Joey De Santi	9–11
Monster Energy Kawasaki Team Green	Kawasaki	201	(United States) Enzo Temmerman	1–2, 8
ThirtyOne3 Cycles	Yamaha	203	(United States) Andrew Boccarossa	5
	Yamaha	205	(United States) Thomas Albano	5, 10
2 Roosters Racing	Yamaha	212	(United States) Wyatt Fields	2, 8
Spangle Racing	Honda	213	(United States) Grady Spangle	8
Warrior MX	Gas Gas	225	(United States) Brett Stralo	1, 3
Skaalerud Racing	KTM	229	(United States) Cameron Skaalerud	7
Raymond Racing	Gas Gas	239	(United States) Bryson Raymond	3, 6–7, 9, 11
EBR SPR Racing	Yamaha	245	(United States) Hayes Edwards	3, 5–11
Lahman Racing	Yamaha	252	(United States) Zachary Lahman	4, 11
Talon Schwall Racing	Yamaha	263	(United States) Talon Schwall	1–3, 6, 8
Blakely Racing	Yamaha	264	(United States) Ben Blakely	8
Honda of the Ozarks	Honda	266	(United States) Brett Greenley	6–7, 9
FrederickTown Yamaha	Yamaha	268	(United States) Gage Stine	1–3, 5–6, 9
Bloxom Racing	Honda	274	(United States) Ashton Bloxom	3–11
Grindstone	Husqvarna	276	(United States) Jaret Finch	1
Wyatt Mattson Racing	Yamaha	279	(United States) Wyatt Mattson	1–3, 5–11
Carsten Racing	Suzuki	281	(United States) Cory Carsten	4, 7
Van Lyssel Racing	Yamaha	285	(United States) Luke Van Lyssel	7–9
Crestview Construction	Gas Gas	294	(United States) Nick McDonnell	5, 10
Jordan Jarvis Racing	Yamaha	301	(United States) Jordan Jarvis	4
3Bros Hatch Racing Husqvarna	Husqvarna	310	(United States) Kai Aiello	1–3, 8
Sun Powersports KTM	KTM	311	(United States) Raice Hernandez	3
Ty Freehill Racing	KTM	316	(United States) Ty Freehill	1–3
Geppert Racing	KTM	320	(United States) Cooper Geppert	4, 11
SC Sporthomes Husqvarna	Husqvarna	322	(United Kingdom) Charlie Heyman	1–2, 10–11
	KTM	340	(United States) Skyler Leaf	7, 9
Biese Racing	Kawasaki	343	(United States) Carter Biese	6–7, 9
Bad Dad Racing	Gas Gas	345	(United States) Joshua Prior	5
Turn One Powersports/Galaxy Cloaking Husqvarna	Husqvarna	350	(United States) Chandler Baker	1–2
Jack Rogers Racing	Kawasaki	351	(United States) Jack Rogers	4, 6, 9
Rock River Yamaha	Yamaha	352	(United States) Bronson McClure	1–3, 6–7
	Suzuki	361	(United States) Chase Yentzer	4
Beckwith Racing	KTM	363	(United States) Taylor Beckwith	6, 11
Wingardner Racing	KTM	365	(United States) Cody Wingardner	1–3, 8
110 Racing	KTM	366	(United States) Blaze Cremaldi	10
McCauley Racing	Yamaha	367	(United States) Christian McCauley	9–10
Team Sakai Racing	Kawasaki	368	(United States) Brock Stiener	6
Werks Powersports Triumph Racing	Triumph	369	(United States) Nicholas Hunt	7, 9–11
MX6 Racing	Yamaha	373	(United States) Gavin Betts	9–11
Austin Black Racing	KTM	377	(United States) Austin Black	1–2, 8–10
Maslak Racing	Yamaha	392	(United States) Pawel Maslak	5, 10
Lennon Racing	KTM	394	(United States) Michael Lennon	1
SLK Motorsports	Honda	422	(United States) Steven Keil	5, 7
RG Racing	Kawasaki	425	(United States) Reven Gordon	1–2
HOP Racing	Yamaha	440	(United States) Austin Kapoukranidis	5, 10
Big St Charles Motorsports	KTM	441	(United States) Zayden Mason	1–2, 11
Bar Aviation Racing	Yamaha	451	(South Africa) Dalton Venter	All
Bar Aviation Racing	Yamaha	565	(Uganda) Stav Orland	All
	Honda	457	(United States) Rashidi Kerrison	10–11
US27 Motorsports/Woolf Aircraft	Kawasaki	470	(United States) Ethan Day	4–7, 9–11
737 Performance KTM	KTM	472	(France) Mathys Boisramé	9–10
Trinity Motorsports	Honda	477	(United States) Mitchell Prescott	6–7
Clinton Racing	Yamaha	496	(United States) KC Clinton	1
NoEgoLife Racing	Kawasaki	497	(United States) Josh Lee	2, 8
Privateer Support Program	KTM	504	(Honduras) Gerhard Matamoros	9, 11
	Kawasaki	505	(United States) Nick Peccarelli	4–6, 10–11
Dirt Care USA	KTM	507	(United States) TJ Lanphear	4–5, 10
	Husqvarna	508	(United States) Jesse Wessell	5
	Yamaha	514	(United States) Anthony Roth	10
	KTM	516	(Mexico) Jorge Rubalcava	3
Team Moto Academy	KTM	524	(United States) Ty Lepicier	5, 10
	Husqvarna	537	(United States) Travis Mecking	4–5
Lake Elsinore Casino Husqvarna Racing	Husqvarna	539	(United States) Cole Zeller	10–11
Procaliber K&M Rebar	Kawasaki	540	(United States) Preston Wittkopp	4
Espe-Tiegs Racing	Gas Gas	548	(United States) Brandon Espe-Tiegs	7–11
	Kawasaki	560	(United States) Kyle Murdoch	5
DHI Rocket Valley KTM	KTM	568	(United States) Justin Hushon	4
Fast Forward Racing	Triumph	577	(United States) Logan Forward	10
US 27 Motorsports/iSchuring Racing	Yamaha	587	(United States) Noah Schuring	5–7, 9, 11
Kitzmiller Racing	Yamaha	595	(United States) Mike Kitzmiller	6
	KTM	605	(United States) Blake Broderick	4, 6, 9
Priority Thor Gas Gas	Gas Gas	613	(Canada) Cole Pranger	11
FFPS Triumph	Triumph	630	(United States) Matt Jackson	4, 6
	Kawasaki	650	(United States) Trevor Hazlett	10
Louds Racing	KTM	655	(United States) Tyler Loud	5
Alex White Racing	KTM	659	(United States) Alex White	5
Chambers Racing	Husqvarna	661	(United States) Noah Chambers	5
GFR	Honda	662	(United States) Dean Gall	7
	Husqvarna	664	(United States) Hunter Stempel	5
Stan Benson	Kawasaki	672	(United States) Brandon Pederson	1, 3, 8
Millikan Racing	Yamaha	674	(United States) Carson Millikan	6, 11
Usko Racing	KTM	689	(United States) Tony Usko	4, 9
Torres Racing	KTM	710	(United States) Jordan Torres	2
Strode Racing	Honda	714	(United States) Kaiser Strode	3, 8
	Suzuki	722	(United States) Josh Carson	4, 6
Rockstar Husqvarna	Husqvarna	723	(United States) Landon Gibson	10–11
McBride Racing	Triumph	732	(United States) Josh McBride	8
SLR Honda	Honda	736	(United States) Jace Allred	1–3, 6, 8–11
Mang Racing	Honda	741	(United States) Spencer Mang	10
Twisted/AAAmx Team	Yamaha	743	(United States) Colton Pursley	6–7, 9
MXU Precision Auto Triumph	Triumph	749	(United States) James Manni	5
Selock Racing	Gas Gas	753	(United States) Jacob Selock	6–7
SDS Racing	Kawasaki	758	(United States) Thomas Ralston	1–3, 6–8
DSC Motorsports	Honda	772	(United States) Dan Schmid	8
Quadlock Honda Racing	Honda	788	(New Zealand) Brodie Connolly	9–11
Platinum Powersports Yamaha	Yamaha	797	(United States) Karter Delong	4–7, 9
AJE Motorsports Gas Gas	Gas Gas	800	(Canada) Preston Masciangelo	1–2, 4
Ehlermann Racing	Yamaha	809	(United States) Brayden Ehlermann	4–5, 11
Williams Racing	Suzuki	811	(United States) Chris Williams	6
Max Darling Racing	Husqvarna	817	(United States) Max Darling	1, 4–7
VanVreede Racing	KTM	819	(United States) Deegan VanVreede	7, 9
Ripper 822	Husqvarna	822	(United States) Riley Ripper	7
Boss Suspension	Triumph	827	(United States) Blake Ovitt	5
Motocross Action	KTM	830	(United States) Ezra Lewis	2
O'Neil Racing	Kawasaki	845	(United States) Bryan O'Neil	8
Smail Racing	Kawasaki	854	(United States) Layton Smail	8
Lasting Impressions CG llc.	Honda	873	(United States) Ronnie Orres	5–7, 9
Williams Racing	Gas Gas	874	(United States) Zack Williams	3
Team Yosemite Fire and Security	Yamaha	877	(United States) Anthony Castaneda	2, 8
Forge MX Training	KTM	901	(United States) Brayden Lessler	1–2
	Yamaha	903	(United States) Kade Johnson	9
R2 Racing	Husqvarna	915	(United States) Ryan Quinn	10
Jayce Cannon Racing	Gas Gas	919	(United States) Jayce Cannon	1–3, 8
Hulsey Racing	Kawasaki	924	(United States) Gage Hulsey	1–10
Brian Medeiros Racing	Yamaha	934	(United States) Brian Medeiros	1–2
Trinity Motorsports	Yamaha	951	(United States) Jadyn Serles	1–4, 6–9
	KTM	959	(United States) Axel Neff	4
Smokin Joes Speed and Style	Yamaha	962	(United States) Joe Tait	5, 10
Ryan Langan Racing	Yamaha	967	(United States) Ryan Langan	5
Dietz Racing	KTM	975	(France) Corentin Dietz	10–11
Little Racing	KTM	991	(United States) Kason Little	6–7

=== Riders Championship ===
Pos	Rider	Bike	FOX (California)		HAN (California)		THU (Colorado)		HIG (Pennsylvania)		SOU (Massachusetts)		RED (Michigan)		SPR (Minnesota)		WAS (Washington (state))		IRN (Indiana)		UNA (New York (state))		BUD (Maryland)		Points
1	(United States) Haiden Deegan	Yamaha	1	1	1	1	2	2	1	1	1	1	14	2	1	2	1	2	1	1	2	3	2	1	502
2	(Japan) Jo Shimoda	Honda	2	2	2	2	9	4	6	5	10	2	1	1	2	4	2	1	2	2	1	1	3	2	454
3	(United States) Garrett Marchbanks	Kawasaki	6	5	7	5	3	8	7	4	6	8	10	12	7	7	3	4	4	6	5	5	8	4	352
4	(United States) Levi Kitchen	Kawasaki	10	Ret	3	3	8	3	2	6	2	4	2	19	13	6	9	10	14	4	10	10	4	3	327
5	(France) Tom Vialle	KTM	4	3	Ret	8	6	5	4	2	3	3	3	21	6	Ret			3	3	4	2	11	DNS	288
6	(Denmark) Mikkel Haarup	Triumph	15	16	10	9	7	13	19	7	5	6	8	5	4	3	10	7	5	9	Ret	DNS			239
7	(United States) Seth Hammaker	Kawasaki	8	7	6	Ret			3	14	9	9	5	16	27	Ret	7	3	9	12	3	6	Ret	7	231
8	(United States) Maximus Vohland	Yamaha	12	10	14	11	12	9	13	13	11	12	15	8	10	17	8	9	7	8	12	17	15	11	230
9	(United States) Jordon Smith	Triumph	13	23	11	6	14	11	12	16	14	7	9	22	15	8	6	14	6	19	8	9	9	Ret	211
10	(United States) Ryder DiFrancesco	Gas Gas	17	9	17	18	15	14	21	11	20	13	12	6	17	15	11	8	17	15	11	8	10	8	191
11	(United States) Drew Adams	Kawasaki	9	14	19	7	5	Ret	16	Ret			17	17	8	21	13	6	8	5	18	12	5	10	186
12	(United States) Dilan Schwartz	Yamaha	24	13	9	13	10	10	Ret	12	16	19	38	7	11	9	4	11	16	18	14	Ret	13	9	182
13	(United States) Michael Mosiman	Yamaha	11	8	5	17	Ret	7	8	20	4	5	4	4	5	18	DNS	DNS	12	Ret	Ret	DNS			180
14	(United States) Nate Thrasher	Yamaha	32	DNS	18	23	19	18	10	10	12	16	7	15	12	20	19	16	13	11	13	7	7	5	170
15	(United States) Julien Beaumer	KTM	5	4	8	4	16	15	15	Ret	18	22	16	13					15	13	6	4	12	Ret	166
16	(United States) Ty Masterpool	Kawasaki	7	15	4	16	4	16	9	17	8	11									9	20	6	6	160
17	(United States) Austin Forkner	Triumph	Ret	22	15	14	11	20	18	Ret	19	14	33	14	9	11	5	5	11	10	17	14	14	19	156
18	(United States) Parker Ross	Yamaha	16	12	16	10	Ret	Ret	Ret	Ret	13	10	11	10	19	10	12	15	19	7	31	16	18	31	138
19	(United States) Chance Hymas	Honda	3	6	13	DNS	1	1	5	3															132
20	(United States) Jalek Swoll	Triumph							14	8	7	15	6	3	16	5	Ret	DNS	10	Ret					115
21	(United States) Lux Turner	KTM	19	18	21	21	17	Ret	27	21	17	20	13	11	18	13	17	17	24	17	19	11	21	16	91
22	(United States) Casey Cochran	Gas Gas	14	11	12	12	13	6	11	9	DNS	DNS													88
23	(United States) Avery Long	KTM	21	29	20	19	20	Ret	17	18	23	17	22	9	14	12	16	12	Ret	14	27	15	25	30	84
24	(United States) Jeremy Martin	Yamaha	20	20	34	DNS									3	1									49
25	(United States) Caden Dudney	Yamaha																			7	13	17	13	38
26	(United States) Alexander Fedortsov	Yamaha	22	19	Ret	15	24	23	Ret	DNS	15	18	21	18	Ret	22	15	19							36
27	(New Zealand) Cole Davies	Yamaha																			23	23	1	17	30
28	(United States) Enzo Temmerman	Kawasaki	18	17	24	DNS											14	13							26
29	(Australia) Kayden Minear	Yamaha					18	12	20	15															23
30	(United States) Cullin Park	Honda															18	20	21	23	21	25	19	15	18
31	(France) Mathys Boisramé	KTM																	18	27	15	18			15
32	(United States) Daxton Bennick	Yamaha																	29	24	28	19	16	12	14
33	(United States) CJ Benard	KTM	34	21	25	Ret	27	22	Ret	27	33	26	24	20	24	19	20	18	23	21	24	Ret	DNS	DNS	13
34	(United States) Mark Fineis	Kawasaki	DNQ	DNQ																					12
34	(United States) Mark Fineis	Honda							DNQ	DNQ	Ret	Ret	18	Ret	33	14	Ret	Ret	Ret	DNS					12
35	(United States) Cole Timboe	Yamaha	36	26	DNQ	34	26	19	25	28			35	Ret	21	16	23	28	Ret	28					10
36	(United States) Landon Gibson	Husqvarna																			DNQ	DNQ	23	14	8
37	(United States) Gage Linville	KTM							DNQ	DNQ	DNQ	DNQ	19	26					20	Ret	20	26			7
38	(United States) Kade Johnson	Yamaha																	Ret	16					6
39	(United States) Lance Kobusch	Honda	25	25	22	Ret	21	17	23	Ret	34	36	28	25	22	DNS									6
40	(United States) Jack Chambers	Kawasaki	30	27	DNQ	20	25	Ret	DNQ	25	24	23	20	Ret	20	23	25	26	DNQ	29	30	Ret			6
41	(Uganda) Stav Orland	Yamaha	DNQ	DNQ	DNQ	DNQ	30	31	DNQ	DNQ	21	Ret	29	29	26	25	27	31	Ret	34	25	29	35	18	5
42	(United States) Gavin Towers	Honda	23	Ret	23	26	23	21	24	19															4
43	(United States) Brock Bennett	Husqvarna	37	DNS	DNQ	22	22	Ret	DNQ	DNQ	27	21	31	23			28	22	Ret	Ret	22	22	20	Ret	3
44	(United States) Kyle Wise	Yamaha	26	31	33	25	Ret	Ret	DNQ	DNQ	22	25	DNQ	DNQ	31	Ret	24	21	22	20	26	24	27	Ret	3
45	(New Zealand) Brodie Connolly	Honda																	26	22	16	21	Ret	DNS	2
46	(South Africa) Dalton Venter	Yamaha	38	33	31	28	34	24	31	Ret	Ret	29	27	31	34	26	29	24	DNQ	DNQ	Ret	31	26	20	2
47	(United States) Hayes Edwards	Yamaha					36	27			36	31	26	27	28	35	Ret	DNS	DNQ	DNQ	DNQ	DNQ	33	21	1
48	(United States) Austin Black	KTM	DNQ	DNQ	28	DNS											21	27	DNQ	DNQ	DNQ	DNQ			1
	(United States) Izaih Clark	Honda											30	Ret	25	27	22	29	Ret	25	35	Ret	22	24	0
	(Australia) Reid Taylor	Yamaha							22	22									25	31	Ret	DNS			0
	(United States) Hunter Yoder	Kawasaki	33	32	DNQ	DNQ	37	DNS	Ret	23											DNQ	DNQ	24	22	0
	(United States) Hamden Hudson	Gas Gas	DNQ	DNQ	DNQ	DNQ	33	29	26	26	26	24	23	24	29	30	26	23	DNQ	26	32	Ret	DNQ	Ret	0
	(United States) Ayden Shive	KTM							33	24					23	24			30	Ret	34	28	30	28	0
	(United States) Crockett Myers	KTM	28	30	35	Ret	32	Ret											31	30	DNQ	DNQ	28	23	0
	(United States) Jace Allred	Honda	DNQ	DNQ	29	24	31	26					Ret	28			31	30	DNQ	DNQ	DNQ	DNQ	DNQ	DNQ	0
	(United States) Chandler Baker	Husqvarna	27	24	DNQ	DNQ																			0
	(United States) Patrick Murphy	Honda	31	37	26	27	DNQ	DNQ	DNQ	DNQ	DNQ	DNQ	DNQ	DNQ	35	28	30	25	DNQ	DNQ	DNQ	Ret	Ret	25	0
	(United States) TJ Albright	Honda									25	27	34	30	Ret	32	32	34			DNQ	DNQ			0
	(United States) Ryder Floyd	Honda	29	28																					0
	(United States) Ryder Floyd	Yamaha					28	25																	0
	(United States) Aidan Dickens	Yamaha	DNQ	DNQ	DNQ	DNQ	DNQ	DNQ	Ret	32	30	34	25	34	30	29	35	DNS							0
	(United States) Gavin Betts	Yamaha																	DNQ	DNQ	DNQ	DNQ	31	26	0
	(United States) Russell Buccheri	KTM							32	30	29	32	DNQ	DNQ	32	31			27	33	33	30	DNQ	DNQ	0
	(United States) Maxwell Sanford	Kawasaki	DNQ	DNQ					30	29	35	33											Ret	27	0
	(United States) Slade Varola	Husqvarna	DNQ	36	27	Ret																			0
	(South Africa) Marcus Phelps	KTM																			Ret	27	Ret	DNS	0
	(United States) Jace Kessler	KTM							28	Ret	37	Ret	DNQ	DNQ	37	33			28	Ret	DNQ	33	DNQ	DNQ	0
	(United States) Wyatt Mattson	Yamaha	DNQ	35	Ret	32	29	28			DNQ	DNQ	DNQ	DNQ	DNQ	DNQ	DNQ	33	DNQ	32	DNQ	32	29	Ret	0
	(United States) Joe Tait	Yamaha									28	30									DNQ	DNQ			0
	(United States) Ashton Arruda	Yamaha									31	28													0
	(United States) Kai Aiello	Husqvarna	DNQ	DNQ	30	29	DNQ	30									33	32							0
	(United States) Jack Rogers	Kawasaki							29	31			39	Ret					DNQ	DNQ					0
	(United Kingdom) Charlie Heyman	Husqvarna	DNQ	DNQ	36	35															29	34	32	Ret	0
	(United States) Cole Zeller	Husqvarna																			DNQ	DNQ	DNQ	29	0
	(Canada) Preston Masciangelo	Gas Gas	DNQ	DNQ	32	30			DNQ	DNQ															0
	(United States) Blake Gardner	Husqvarna	DNQ	Ret	DNQ	31																			0
	(United States) Bryson Raymond	Gas Gas					DNQ	DNQ					32	Ret	DNQ	DNQ			DNQ	DNQ			34	33	0
	(United States) Kyle Murdoch	Kawasaki									32	35													0
	(United States) Carson Mainquist	KTM	DNQ	DNQ	DNQ	DNQ	DNQ	DNQ	DNQ	DNQ	DNQ	DNQ	36	32	DNQ	DNQ	DNQ	DNQ	DNQ	DNQ	DNQ	DNQ	DNQ	DNQ	0
	(United States) Ashton Bloxom	Honda					DNQ	DNQ	DNQ	DNQ	DNQ	DNQ	DNQ	DNQ	DNQ	DNQ	DNQ	38	DNQ	DNQ	DNQ	DNQ	DNQ	32	0
	(United States) Kason Little	KTM											37	33	DNQ	DNQ									0
	(United States) Dayton Briggs	Husqvarna	DNQ	DNQ	DNQ	DNQ	DNQ	DNQ	Ret	33	DNQ	DNQ	DNQ	DNQ											0
	(United States) Reven Gordon	Kawasaki	DNQ	DNQ	Ret	33																			0
	(United States) Jadyn Serles	Yamaha	DNQ	DNQ	DNQ	DNQ	DNQ	DNQ	DNQ	DNQ			DNQ	DNQ	36	34	36	35	DNQ	DNQ					0
	(United States) Brayden Lessler	KTM	35	34	DNQ	DNQ																			0
	(United States) Thomas Ralston	Kawasaki	DNQ	DNQ	DNQ	DNQ	DNQ	DNQ					DNQ	DNQ	DNQ	DNQ	34	37							0
	(United States) Bronson McClure	Yamaha	DNQ	DNQ	DNQ	DNQ	35	Ret					DNQ	DNQ	38	37									0
	(South Africa) Barend Du Toit	KTM	DNQ	DNQ	DNQ	DNQ	DNQ	DNQ	DNQ	DNQ			DNQ	DNQ	DNQ	DNQ	DNQ	36							0
	(United States) Carter Biese	Kawasaki											DNQ	DNQ	DNQ	36			DNQ	DNQ					0
	(United States) Jayce Cannon	Gas Gas	DNQ	DNQ	DNQ	DNQ	DNQ	DNQ									DNQ	39							0
	(United States) Gage Stine	Yamaha	DNQ	DNQ	DNQ	DNQ	DNQ	DNQ			Ret	Ret	DNQ	DNQ					DNQ	DNQ					0
	(United States) Stilez Robertson	Triumph	Ret	DNS																					0
	(United States) Dylan Cunha	Husqvarna	DNQ	DNQ	DNQ	DNQ	DNQ	DNQ	DNQ	DNQ	DNQ	DNQ	DNQ	DNQ	DNQ	DNQ	Ret	DNS	DNQ	DNQ	DNQ	DNQ	DNQ	DNQ	0
	(United States) Jett Reynolds	Yamaha																	Ret	DNS					0
	(United States) Pierce Brown	Yamaha																	Ret	DNS					0
	(Canada) Cole Pranger	Gas Gas																					Ret	DNS	0
	(United States) Gage Hulsey	Kawasaki	DNQ	DNQ	DNQ	DNQ	DNQ	DNQ	DNQ	DNQ	DNQ	DNQ	DNQ	DNQ	DNQ	DNQ	DNQ	DNQ	DNQ	DNQ	DNQ	DNQ			0
	(United States) Matthew Mowery	Kawasaki							DNQ	DNQ	DNQ	DNQ	DNQ	DNQ	DNQ	DNQ	DNQ	DNQ	DNQ	DNQ	DNQ	DNQ	DNQ	DNQ	0
	(United States) Ethan Day	Kawasaki							DNQ	DNQ	DNQ	DNQ	DNQ	DNQ	DNQ	DNQ			DNQ	DNQ	DNQ	DNQ	DNQ	DNQ	0
	(United States) Kyle Czworkowski	Honda							DNQ	DNQ	DNQ	DNQ	DNQ	DNQ	DNQ	DNQ			DNQ	DNQ	DNQ	DNQ	DNQ	DNQ	0
	(United States) Talon Schwall	Yamaha	DNQ	DNQ	DNQ	DNQ	DNQ	DNQ					DNQ	DNQ			DNQ	DNQ							0
	(United States) Max Darling	Husqvarna	DNQ	DNQ					DNQ	DNQ	DNQ	DNQ	DNQ	DNQ	DNQ	DNQ									0
	(United States) Karter Delong	Yamaha							DNQ	DNQ	DNQ	DNQ	DNQ	DNQ	DNQ	DNQ			DNQ	DNQ					0
	(United States) Hayden Hoover	Yamaha							DNQ	DNQ	DNQ	DNQ	DNQ	DNQ					DNQ	DNQ			DNQ	DNQ	0
	(United States) Nick Peccarelli	Kawasaki							DNQ	DNQ	DNQ	DNQ	DNQ	DNQ							DNQ	DNQ	DNQ	DNQ	0
	(United States) Noah Schuring	Yamaha									DNQ	DNQ	DNQ	DNQ	DNQ	DNQ			DNQ	DNQ			DNQ	DNQ	0
	(United States) Brandon Espe-Tiegs	Gas Gas													DNQ	DNQ	DNQ	DNQ	DNQ	DNQ	DNQ	DNQ	DNQ	DNQ	0
	(United States) Cody Wingardner	KTM	DNQ	DNQ	DNQ	DNQ	DNQ	DNQ									DNQ	DNQ							0
	(United States) Keegan Rowley	Yamaha							DNQ	DNQ	DNQ	DNQ	DNQ	DNQ	DNQ	DNQ									0
	(United States) Ronnie Orres	Honda									DNQ	DNQ	DNQ	DNQ	DNQ	DNQ			DNQ	DNQ					0
	(United States) Nicholas Hunt	Triumph													DNQ	DNQ			DNQ	DNQ	DNQ	DNQ	DNQ	DNQ	0
	(United States) Ty Freehill	KTM	DNQ	DNQ	DNQ	DNQ	DNQ	DNQ																	0
	(United States) Zayden Mason	KTM	DNQ	DNQ	DNQ	DNQ																	DNQ	DNQ	0
	(United States) Brandon Pederson	Kawasaki	DNQ	DNQ			DNQ	DNQ									DNQ	DNQ							0
	(United States) Brian Saunier	KTM							DNQ	DNQ	DNQ	DNQ	DNQ	DNQ											0
	(United States) TJ Lanphear	KTM							DNQ	DNQ	DNQ	DNQ									DNQ	DNQ			0
	(United States) Brayden Ehlermann	Yamaha							DNQ	DNQ	DNQ	DNQ											DNQ	DNQ	0
	(United States) Blake Broderick	KTM							DNQ	DNQ			DNQ	DNQ					DNQ	DNQ					0
	(United States) Brett Greenley	Honda											DNQ	DNQ	DNQ	DNQ			DNQ	DNQ					0
	(United States) Colton Pursley	Yamaha											DNQ	DNQ	DNQ	DNQ			DNQ	DNQ					0
	(United States) Luke Van Lyssel	Yamaha													DNQ	DNQ	DNQ	DNQ	DNQ	DNQ					0
	(United States) Joey De Santi	Yamaha																	DNQ	DNQ	DNQ	DNQ	DNQ	DNQ	0
	(United States) Trevor Colip	Honda	DNQ	DNQ	DNQ	DNQ																			0
	(United States) Brian Medeiros	Yamaha	DNQ	DNQ	DNQ	DNQ																			0
	(United States) Jaxen Driskell	Yamaha	DNQ	DNQ	DNQ	DNQ																			0
	(United States) Brett Stralo	Gas Gas	DNQ	DNQ			DNQ	DNQ																	0
	(United States) Josh Lee	Kawasaki			DNQ	DNQ											DNQ	DNQ							0
	(United States) Wyatt Fields	Yamaha			DNQ	DNQ											DNQ	DNQ							0
	(United States) Anthony Castaneda	Yamaha			DNQ	DNQ											DNQ	DNQ							0
	(United States) Kaiser Strode	Honda					DNQ	DNQ									DNQ	DNQ							0
	(United States) Travis Mecking	Husqvarna							DNQ	DNQ	DNQ	DNQ													0
	(United States) Josh Carson	Suzuki							DNQ	DNQ			DNQ	DNQ											0
	(United States) Matt Jackson	Triumph							DNQ	DNQ			DNQ	DNQ											0
	(United States) Cory Carsten	Suzuki							DNQ	DNQ					DNQ	DNQ									0
	(United States) Tony Usko	KTM							DNQ	DNQ									DNQ	DNQ					0
	(United States) Zachary Lahman	Yamaha							DNQ	DNQ													DNQ	DNQ	0
	(United States) Evan Johnson	Yamaha							DNQ	DNQ													DNQ	DNQ	0
	(United States) Cooper Geppert	KTM							DNQ	DNQ													DNQ	DNQ	0
	(United States) Steven Keil	Honda									DNQ	DNQ			DNQ	DNQ									0
	(United States) Ty Lepicier	KTM									DNQ	DNQ									DNQ	DNQ			0
	(United States) Austin Kapoukranidis	Yamaha									DNQ	DNQ									DNQ	DNQ			0
	(United States) Nick McDonnell	Gas Gas									DNQ	DNQ									DNQ	DNQ			0
	(United States) Pawel Maslak	Yamaha									DNQ	DNQ									DNQ	DNQ			0
	(United States) Thomas Albano	Yamaha									DNQ	DNQ									DNQ	DNQ			0
	(United States) Ryder Gwynn	Kawasaki											DNQ	DNQ	DNQ	DNQ									0
	(United States) Jacob Selock	Gas Gas											DNQ	DNQ	DNQ	DNQ									0
	(United States) Mitchell Prescott	Honda											DNQ	DNQ	DNQ	DNQ									0
	(United States) Carson Millikan	Yamaha											DNQ	DNQ									DNQ	DNQ	0
	(United States) Taylor Beckwith	KTM											DNQ	DNQ									DNQ	DNQ	0
	(United States) Skyler Leaf	KTM													DNQ	DNQ			DNQ	DNQ					0
	(United States) Deegan VanVreede	KTM													DNQ	DNQ			DNQ	DNQ					0
	(United States) Christian McCauley	Yamaha																	DNQ	DNQ	DNQ	DNQ			0
	(United States) Cale Kuchnicki	Gas Gas																	DNQ	DNQ			DNQ	DNQ	0
	(Honduras) Gerhard Matamoros	KTM																	DNQ	DNQ			DNQ	DNQ	0
	(France) Corentin Dietz	KTM																			DNQ	DNQ	DNQ	DNQ	0
	(United States) Rashidi Kerrison	Honda																			DNQ	DNQ	DNQ	DNQ	0
	(United States) Jaret Finch	Husqvarna	DNQ	DNQ																					0
	(United States) KC Clinton	Yamaha	DNQ	DNQ																					0
	(United States) Nicholas Romano	Honda	DNQ	DNQ																					0
	(United States) Michael Lennon	KTM	DNQ	DNQ																					0
	(United States) Jordan Torres	KTM			DNQ	DNQ																			0
	(United States) Ezra Lewis	KTM			DNQ	DNQ																			0
	(United States) Zack Williams	Gas Gas					DNQ	DNQ																	0
	(Mexico) Jorge Rubalcava	KTM					DNQ	DNQ																	0
	(United States) Raice Hernandez	KTM					DNQ	DNQ																	0
	(United States) Jordan Jarvis	Yamaha							DNQ	DNQ															0
	(United States) Axel Neff	KTM							DNQ	DNQ															0
	(United States) Chase Yentzer	Suzuki							DNQ	DNQ															0
	(United States) Larry Fortin	KTM							DNQ	DNQ															0
	(United States) Justin Hushon	KTM							DNQ	DNQ															0
	(United States) Preston Wittkopp	Kawasaki							DNQ	DNQ															0
	(United States) Jesse Wessell	Husqvarna									DNQ	DNQ													0
	(United States) Joshua Prior	Gas Gas									DNQ	DNQ													0
	(United States) Hunter Stempel	Husqvarna									DNQ	DNQ													0
	(United States) Noah Chambers	Husqvarna									DNQ	DNQ													0
	(United States) James Manni	Triumph									DNQ	DNQ													0
	(United States) Andrew Boccarossa	Yamaha									DNQ	DNQ													0
	(United States) Alex White	KTM									DNQ	DNQ													0
	(United States) Tyler Loud	KTM									DNQ	DNQ													0
	(United States) Ryan Langan	Yamaha									DNQ	DNQ													0
	(United States) Blake Ovitt	Triumph									DNQ	DNQ													0
	(United States) Chris Williams	Suzuki											DNQ	DNQ											0
	(United States) Brock Stiener	Kawasaki											DNQ	DNQ											0
	(United States) Mike Kitzmiller	Yamaha											DNQ	DNQ											0
	(United States) Dean Gall	Honda													DNQ	DNQ									0
	(United States) Cameron Skaalerud	KTM													DNQ	DNQ									0
	(United States) Ace Enloe	Husqvarna													DNQ	DNQ									0
	(United States) Riley Ripper	Husqvarna													DNQ	DNQ									0
	(United States) Layton Smail	Kawasaki															DNQ	DNQ							0
	(United States) Dan Schmid	Honda															DNQ	DNQ							0
	(United States) Grady Spangle	Honda															DNQ	DNQ							0
	(United States) Bryan O'Neil	Kawasaki															DNQ	DNQ							0
	(United States) Josh McBride	Triumph															DNQ	DNQ							0
	(United States) Ben Blakely	Yamaha															DNQ	DNQ							0
	(United States) Braden Spangle	Yamaha															DNQ	DNQ							0
	(United States) Trevor Hazlett	Kawasaki																			DNQ	DNQ			0
	(United States) Logan Forward	Triumph																			DNQ	DNQ			0
	(United States) Blaze Cremaldi	KTM																			DNQ	DNQ			0
	(United States) Anthony Roth	Yamaha																			DNQ	DNQ			0
	(United States) Spencer Mang	Honda																			DNQ	DNQ			0
	(United States) Ryan Quinn	Husqvarna																			DNQ	DNQ			0
	(United States) Mitchell Zaremba	Yamaha																					DNQ	DNQ	0
Pos	Rider	Bike	FOX (California)		HAN (California)		THU (Colorado)		HIG (Pennsylvania)		SOU (Massachusetts)		RED (Michigan)		SPR (Minnesota)		WAS (Washington (state))		IRN (Indiana)		UNA (New York (state))		BUD (Maryland)		Points
