= AMA Horizon Award =

Nicky Hayden AMA Horizon Award, originally the AMA Horizon Award, is given annually to promising amateur riders in motorcycle racing. The inaugural AMA Horizon Award was presented to Nicky Hayden in 1997. In 2017 the award was renamed in honor of Nicky Hayden who was killed in a bicycling accident while training in Italy. The award is presented annually to outstanding amateur riders in flat track, motocross and road racing.

AMA Horizon Award Recipients
Year	Flat Track	Motocross	Road Racing
1997	Nicky Hayden	Nick Wey	Eric Wood
1998	Roger Lee Hayden	Billy Payne	Tbd
1999	Bryan Smith; Tony Meiring	Travis Pastrana	Jason DiSalvo
2000	Cory McDermitt	Ben Riddle	Ben Spies
2001	Jared Mees	James Stewart Jr.	Doug Duane
2002	Nick Cummings; Logan Myers	Evan Laughridge	Chris Caylor
2003	Ricky Marshall	Davi Millsaps	Brian Stokes
2004	Johnny Lewis	Mike Alessi	Logan Young
2005	Stevie Bonsey	Ryan Villopoto	Blake Young
2006	Matt Weidman	Josh Hill	Cory Burleson
2007	Jeffrey Carver, Jr.	Trey Canard	Zac Chapman
2008	Brad Baker	Darryn Durham; PJ Larsen	Christopher Clark
2009	Mike Avila	Dean Wilson	Miles Thornton
2010	Briar Bauman	Jason Anderson	Hayden Gillim
2011	Dan Bromley	Justin Bogle	Jake Lewis
2012	JR Addison	Zach Bell	Andre Ochs
2013	Jeffery Lowery	Matt Bisceglia	tbd
2014	Hunter Edwards	RJ Hampshire	Anthony Mazziotto III
2015	Kevin Stollings	Benny Bloss	Xavier Zayat
2016	Jarred Brook	Chase Sexton	Jody Barry
2017	Hunter Brooks	Justin Cooper	Joseph Blasius
2018	Dallas Daniels	Derek Drake	Dallas Daniels
2019	Trevor Brunner	Jalek Swoll	Blake Davis
2020	Kody Kopp	Stilez Robertson	Gabriel Da Silva
2021	Chase Saathoff	Levi Kitchen	tbd
2022	Clarke Morian V	Caden Braswell	Alessandro Di Mario
2023	Evan Renshaw	Daxton Bennick	Trenton Keesee
2024	Walker Porter	Drew Adams	
2025	Bodie Paige		
