= Mike Alessi =

American motorcycle racer

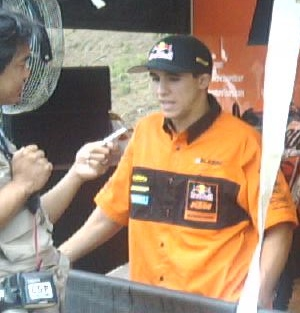
- Alessi during an interview in 2007

Personal Information
- Name: Mike Alessi
- Birth Date: May 19, 1988 (age 38)
- Nationality: United States

Team Information
- Current Team: MotoConcepts
- National Number: 800
- Teammates: Vince Friese; Jeff Alessi

Professional Teams
- 2012 – 2019: MotoConcepts
- 2010 – 2011: Red Bull KTM
- 2008 – 2009: Rockstar Makita Suzuki
- 2004 – 2007: Red Bull KTM
- 2004: Varner Motorsports Honda

Series Finishes
- 2012 AMA Motocross National: 2nd Place
- 2012 AMA Supercross: 6th Place
- 2011 AMA Motocross National: 5th Place
- 2011 AMA Supercross: 12th Place
- 2010 AMA Motocross National: 5th Place
- 2009 AMA Motocross National: 13th Place
- 2009 AMA Supercross: 9th Place
- 2008 AMA Motocross National: 10th Place
- 2008 AMA Supercross: 17th Place
- 2007 AMA Motocross National: 2nd Place
- 2007 AMA Supercross Lites East: 8th Place
- 2006 AMA Motocross Lites National: 2nd Place
- 2006 AMA Supercross Lites West: 4th Place
- 2005 AMA Motocross 125 National: 3rd Place

Accomplishments
- Motocross Overall Wins: 2
- Motocross Podiums: 25
- Supercross Podiums: 1
- Motocross Lites Overall Wins: 3
- Motocross Lites Podiums: 13
- Supercross Lites Podiums: 4

Awards
- 2004 AMA Horizon Award

Mike Alessi (born May 19, 1988), sometimes known as “Mr. Holeshot”, is an American former professional motocross and supercross racer. He competed in the AMA Motocross Championships from 2004 to 2019.

== Amateur career ==
Alessi began riding motorcycles at the age of three and became a professional racer at age sixteen. His rise through the amateur ranks began at age six, when he won his first national championship at Loretta Lynn's in Hurricane Mills, Tennessee. After ten years, Alessi had tied James Stewart Jr.'s all-time Amateur National championships with eleven. Mike Alessi's talent has been overshadowed by his family ever since.

== Professional debut ==
When Alessi first turned pro in 2004, he made an appearance in two races in the 250/450cc class. His first race was at Spring Creek Motocross Park in Millville, Minnesota. He failed to score any points and was 30th overall. Three weeks later, at Steel City Raceway in Delmont, Pennsylvania, Alessi proved that he could compete at the professional level when he scored a third overall finish behind Ricky Carmichael and Kevin Windham in his second professional race.

== 250/Lites Class career ==
Alessi elected to sit out the 2005 Supercross season in order to prepare himself for his first full season as a professional motocross rider in the 125/250cc class. He had four podium finishes that year, two of which he finished first place overall. An on-track incident at the final race at Glen Helen Raceway in San Bernardino, California led to his disqualification from the event. As a result, Alessi was put on a year long probation by the American Motorcyclist Association and finished third overall in the championship.

The beginning of 2006 marked the first season of Supercross in which Alessi would be contesting. He struggled the first few rounds of the Supercross Lites West Region series, but began to find his rhythm towards the end of the season. He scored a top five finish in the last five rounds of the series that included two back to back third-place finishes at San Francisco and Anaheim. Alessi finished the West Region championship in fourth place. The final Supercross race of the season did not count for the Lites championship, but that did not stop Alessi from finishing a career best second place overall at the Las Vegas Lites East/West Shootout.

Riding the season ending success he experienced in Supercross, Alessi looked poised to win his first professional championship in the 2006 Motocross Lites National Championship series. Alessi opened the series with a first place overall finish at the Hangtown Motocross Classic in Sacramento, California. He went on to score eight additional podium (top three) finishes. Unfortunately, his consistent success was not enough to best his counterpart Ryan Villopoto. Alessi finished the season second overall.

In 2007, Alessi moved over to contest the Supercross Lites East Region Championship. After one top three performance and two DNFs (did not finish), Alessi finished eighth in the championship.

== 450/Premier Class career ==
Alessi had announced early in 2007 that he was stepping up to race in the premier Motocross Class for the 2007 AMA Motocross Championship. Many critics felt that he was abandoning his chance at a championship in the Lites class, but Alessi was confident that he was making the right choice for himself. After finishing the first two races just barely inside the top ten, Alessi recorded six podium finishes and finished second place overall in his rookie season in the Motocross class.

Alessi's debut season in the Supercross Class seemed promising as he was fourth place in the championship points race after five of seventeen rounds. His season was cut short in San Diego during the sixth round of the 2008 Monster Energy AMA Supercross Championship. During the second practice session, Alessi crashed in the whoops section of the track resulting in a broken collarbone. After a seven-week recovery, Alessi decided to sit out the remainder of the 2008 Supercross season in order to prepare for the upcoming 2008 AMA Motocross Championship.

Alessi quickly established himself as the second fastest racer behind James Stewart Jr. during the initial rounds of the 2008 AMA Motocross Championship. However, Alessi suffered a severe crash at Red Bud Raceway on July 6, 2008, during the second moto. The crash resulted in Alessi breaking both shoulder blades and a rib, bruising a lung, and suffering a severe concussion. He sat out the remainder of the season and finished tenth overall in the championship.

In September 2008, three months before the beginning of the 2009 Monster Energy AMA Supercross series, Alessi broke his fibula and tibia bones in the lower left leg during a Supercross practice session. After recovering from his injuries, Alessi competed in the entire 2009 Supercross season scoring eleven top ten finishes one of which was a third place podium finish in Indianapolis. He finished the season ninth place overall.

The 2009 Lucas Oil AMA Pro Motocross saw the renewed rivalry of Ryan Villopoto and Mike Alessi as Villopoto made his debut in the newly renamed 450cc Class (previously called the Motocross Class.) Alessi finished second overall behind Villopoto at Glen Helen Raceway in San Bernardino, California. In preparation for the second round of the series, Villopoto injured his knee during practice and would be forced to have surgery and sit out the remainder of the 2009 season. With Villopoto out for the season, Alessi won the second and third races of the series and took over the series points lead. In preparation for the fourth round of the series, Alessi crashed during a practice session and broke his left kneecap. After surgery and a two-week recovery, Alessi felt he could rejoin the 2009 Lucas Oil AMA Pro Motocross series and continue fighting for the championship. After a crash in the first moto of the fifth round at Thunder Valley Motocross Park in Colorado, Alessi opted not to risk further damage to his knee and decided to sit out the remainder of the 2009 motocross season.

For the 2010 racing season, Alessi signed once again with the KTM factory team. He sat out the entire 2010 Supercross season spending most of his time in Europe testing the brand new KTM 350 SX-F. Alessi debuted the 350cc machine at the opening round of the 2010 AMA Motocross Championship. He scored an impressive second moto win and took home a second overall finish. Unfortunately, Alessi struggled the rest of the summer to produce the results he experienced during the first round of the series. After scoring only one more top three overall finish (a second place during the tenth of twelve rounds) Alessi finished the series fifth overall.

The 2011 Supercross season began with Alessi competing in his first American Supercross race on a KTM 350 SX-F. He scored a season best sixth place in Seattle and finished the series in twelfth place. There was a lot of anticipation surrounding the 2011 AMA National Motocross series as Alessi returned to racing the KTM 450 SX-F. He began the season at the Hangtown National by setting the fastest overall qualifying time in practice. Unfortunately, on the very next lap, Alessi crashed on a downhill jump and suffered a concussion that forced him to sit out the first two rounds of the series. He was able to score consistent points over the next ten rounds and finished a respectable fifth overall.

In October 2011, Alessi signed with team MotoConcepts, along with his brother Jeff Alessi, to race aboard a Suzuki RM-Z450. Alessi scored 11 top-ten finishes during the 2012 AMA Supercross season which included three top five finishes. He finished the series with a career best sixth place overall.

Team MCR and Mike Alessi were recently embroiled in controversy over an incident on July 20, 2013. Moments before the start of the first moto of the 450 class at Washougal, Team MotoConcepts Racing (MCR) crew member Jeff Alessi pointed a green laser light directly at the eyes of competitor Ryan Villopoto as he prepared for the start of the race. There was a report of a second laser incident against another rider that same day. An additional incident that same day involved Tony Alessi (MCR Team Manager) initiating and engaged in a public argument and confrontation with journalist Steve Matthes, a member of the media in the open paddock in front of the MCR pit area, in full view of the general public. Alessi was purportedly angered that Matthes had posted a tweet earlier in the day commenting on the Alessi’s alleged involvement with a laser pointed at riders. A portion of the incident was videoed by witnesses and posted on the internet (YouTube). The result ended in the members of the MCR team being suspended, loss of championship points for that event, and a fine of $10,000 being levied against Mike Alessi for his team's misconduct.

== Personal life ==
Alessi currently splits his time living in Victorville, California, and Hilliard, Florida, with his wife, Danielle. They were married on September 28, 2011.

== Sponsorships ==
Alessi has raced for Honda, Factory Suzuki, Factory KTM, and now MotoConcepts Suzuki. His major sponsors include, WASPcam Action Cameras, Motoconcepts Rider Accessories, JT Racing USA (gear), Shoei (helmets), Alpinestars (boots), EKS Brand goggles, and EVS Knee Braces.

== Controversy ==
A Notice of Offense and Penalty was submitted by Roy Janson, Competition Director, on July 22, 2013, for crew and family member Jeff Alessi using a green laser pointer to distract other racers at the starting gate during the Washougal National July 20, 2013. It is indicated that "Mike Alessi is hereby held responsible for the actions of his crew members, and is fined $10,000" as well as a fine of $5,000 for Jeff Alessi's verbal confrontations with race officials.
