= Thomas Williams =

Thomas Williams may refer to:

== Academics ==
- Thomas Williams, Gresham Professor of Astronomy
- Thomas Desmond Williams (1921–1987), Irish academic and Professor of Modern History at University College Dublin
- Thomas R. Williams (1939–2025), Canadian educator, 19th principal of Queen's University
- T. Harry Williams (1909–1979), historian at Louisiana State University
- Thomas Williams, Assistant Dean, Sandra Day O'Connor College of Law
- T. C. Williams, American educator for whom T. C. Williams High School, Alexandria, Virginia, is named
- Thomas W. Williams (engineer), American educator and 1989 IEEE fellow
- Thomas Williams (philosopher), American philosopher

== Arts ==
- Thomas Williams (cartoonist) (1940–2002), English cartoonist
- Thomas Williams (Christadelphian) (1847–1913), editor of the Christadelphian Advocate magazine
- Thomas Williams (writer) (1926–1990), American novelist
- Tennessee Williams (Thomas Lanier Williams, 1911–1983), American playwright
- Thomas Richard Williams (1825–1871), British photographer
- Ras Shiloh (born 1975), stage name for reggae artist Thomas Williams
- Thomas Chatterton Williams (born 1981), American writer

== Military ==
- Thomas Williams (Australian Army officer) (1884–1950), Australian major general
- Thomas Williams (Union general) (1815–1862), Union general during the American Civil War
- Thomas Williams (Royal Navy officer) (1761/62-1841), British admiral
- Thomas Williams (RAF officer) (1899–1956), British air marshal
- Thomas F. Williams (1885–1985), Canadian First World War flying ace
- Thomas J. Williams (1837–1866), American Union general during the American Civil War

== Religion ==
- Thomas Williams (priest and translator) (1658–1726), Welsh Anglican priest
- Thomas Williams (vicar apostolic of the Northern District) (1661–1740), Roman Catholic bishop
- Thomas Williams (Congregational minister) (1725–1770)
- Thomas Williams (1755–1839), author of the Cottage Bible
- Thomas Williams (1779–1876), Congregational minister
- Thomas Williams (Christadelphian) (1847–1913)
- Thomas Rhondda Williams (1860–1945), Welsh Congregational minister
- Thomas Charles Williams (1868–1927), Welsh Calvinistic Methodist minister
- Thomas Williams (dean of Bangor) (1870–1941), Welsh Anglican priest
- Thomas Leighton Williams (1877–1946), British Roman Catholic archbishop
- Thomas Williams (archdeacon of Craven) (1889–1956), Anglican priest
- Thomas Williams (cardinal) (1930–2023), Roman Catholic bishop
- Thomas Williams (dean of Llandaff) (died 1877), Welsh Anglican priest

== Politicians ==
=== Australia ===
- Thomas Williams (South Australian politician) (c. 1794–1881), politician in the colony of South Australia
- Thomas Williams (Australian politician) (1897–1992)
- Thomas Williams (New South Wales politician) (1862–1953), Australian politician

=== United Kingdom ===
- Thomas Williams (by 1518-79/90), MP for Oxford
- Thomas Williams (speaker) (1513/4–1566), Speaker of the House of Commons
- Thomas Williams (Warrington MP) (1915–1986), British Labour Co-operative politician
- Thomas Williams of Llanidan (1737–1802), Welsh lawyer and businessman known as the "Copper King of Parys Mountain", MP for Marlow 1790–1802
- Thomas Williams, 1st Baron Williams (1892–1966), British life peer and Labour Party member
- Jeremiah Williams (British politician) (Thomas Jeremiah Williams, 1872–1919), Welsh barrister and Liberal politician
- Thomas Peers Williams (1795–1875), MP for Marlow 1820–1868, Father of the House, 1867–1868; grandson of Thomas Williams of Llanidan
- T. Russell Williams (1869–1926), socialist activist
- Thomas Williams (Kennington MP) (1877–1927), British Member of Parliament for Kennington, 1923–1924
- Sir Thomas Williams, 1st Baronet (c. 1621–1712), English medical doctor and Member of Parliament for Weobley
- Thomas Williams of Edwinsford (died 1762), Custos Rotulorum of Carmarthenshire from 1745 to 1762

=== United States ===
- Thomas Williams (Alabama politician) (1825–1903), US representative
- Thomas Williams (Pennsylvania politician) (1806–1872), US representative
- Thomas Edward Williams (politician) (1849–1931), American politician in Wisconsin and Nebraska
- Thomas Hickman Williams (1801–1851), US senator from Mississippi, 1837–1838
- Thomas Hill Williams (1780–1840), US senator from Mississippi, 1817–1828
- Thomas Lanier Williams I (1786–1856), American lawyer who served as a justice of the Tennessee Supreme Court
- Thomas Marvin Williams (1890–1967), member of the Mississippi State Senate
- Thomas Scott Williams (1777–1861), US representative from Connecticut
- Thomas Sutler Williams (1872–1940), US representative from Illinois
- Thomas Wheeler Williams (1789–1874), US representative from Connecticut
- Thomas W. Williams (politician) (c. 1867–1931), church minister and member of the Los Angeles, California, City Council

== Sport ==
- Thomas Williams (American football) (born 1984)
- Thomas Williams (cricketer, born 1884) (1884–1954), Welsh cricketer
- Thomas Williams (Irish cricketer) (1908–1982)
- Thomas Williams (figure skater) (born 1991), Canadian ice dancer
- Thomas Williams (rugby league), rugby league footballer of the 1910s for Wales, and Oldham
- Thomas Williams (soccer) (born 2004), American soccer player
- Thomas Williams Jr. (born 1987), American boxer

== Others ==
- Thomas H. Williams (California official) (1828–1886), attorney general of California, 1858–1862
- Thomas Lyle Williams (1896–1976), American businessman
- Thomas Williams (manufacturer) (1846–?), New Zealand ironfounder and businessman
- Thomas Williams (Mayflower), signatory of the Mayflower Compact
- Thomas Williams (pioneer) (died 1785), early settler to Detroit, Michigan and grandfather of general Thomas Williams
- Thomas Williams (died 1831), murderer, one of the London Burkers
- Thomas Walter Williams (1763–1833), English barrister, known as a legal writer
- Thomas Williams (Northern Rhodesian speaker) (1893–1967), Speaker of the Legislative Council of Northern Rhodesia
- Thomas Coldham Williams (1825–1912), New Zealand land owner
- Thomas Williams (Tehoragwanegen) (c.1758–1848), Iroquois chief of the Kahnawake peoples
- T. Marchant Williams, Welsh nationalist, lawyer, and author

== See also ==
- Thomas Thangathurai William, Sri Lankan politician
- Tom Williams (disambiguation)
- Tomos Williams (born 1995), Welsh rugby union player
