= Thomas L. Williams =

Thomas L. Williams may refer to:

- Thomas Lanier Williams I (1786–1856), American lawyer who served as a justice of the Tennessee Supreme Court
- Thomas Lanier Williams (1911–1983), the birth name of the US playwright Tennessee Williams
- Thomas Leighton Williams (1877–1946), Roman Catholic archbishop of Birmingham, England
- Thomas Lanier Williams (judge) (1788–1856), justice of the Tennessee Supreme Court
- Thomas Lewis Williams, member of the Queensland Legislative Assembly from 1932 to 1947
- Thomas Lyle Williams (1896–1976), American businessman

== See also ==
- Thomas Williams (disambiguation)
