= Thomas Edward Williams =

Thomas Edward Williams may refer to:

- Thomas Williams, 1st Baron Williams, peer of the United Kingdom
- Thomas Edward Williams (politician), American banker, educator, and pioneer
- Tommy Williams (footballer, born 1957), Scottish footballer

== See also ==
- Thomas Williams (disambiguation)
- Edward Thomas Williams, lieutenant general in the United States Army
