= Maybelline New York =

Cosmetics company

- Type: Subsidiary
- Industry: Cosmetics
- Founded: 1915 (111 years ago) in Chicago as The Maybelline Company
- Founder: Thomas Lyle Williams
- Headquarters: 10 Hudson Yards; New York City 10001; U.S.
- Area served: Worldwide
- Key people: Trisha Ayyagari (President, Global); Amy Whang (President, US)
- Products: Cosmetics; skincare; perfume; personal care
- Parent: L'Oréal
- Website: maybelline.com

Maybelline New York (formerly The Maybelline Company and Mabelline and Co.), trading as and commonly known as simply Maybelline (/ˈmeɪbɪliːn/ MAY-bil-een), is an American multinational cosmetics, skin care, perfume, and personal care company, based in New York City. Founded in Chicago in 1915, it has been a subsidiary of French cosmetics company L'Oréal since 1996.

== History ==
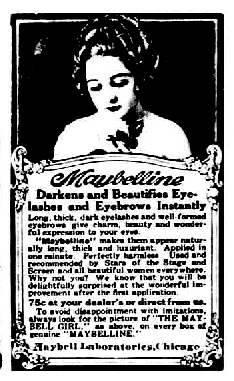
1920 ad for Maybelline.

The Maybelline Company was founded in Chicago by pharmacist Thomas Lyle Williams in 1915. Williams noticed his older sister Mabel applying a mixture of Vaseline and coal dust to her eyelashes to give them a darker, fuller look. He adapted it with a chemistry set and produced a product sold locally called Lash-Brow-Ine.

Williams renamed his eye beautifier Maybelline in her honor. In 1917, the company produced Maybelline Cake Mascara, "the first modern eye cosmetic for everyday use", and Ultra Lash, the first mass-market automatic, in the 1960s.

In 1967, the company was sold by Williams to Plough Inc. (later Schering-Plough) in Memphis, Tennessee. The cosmetic production facility was moved from Chicago to Memphis over one weekend. In 1975, the company moved to Little Rock, Arkansas. In 1990, Schering-Plough sold Maybelline to a New York investment firm, Wasserstein Perella & Co. Maybelline's headquarters remained in Memphis until its acquisition by L'Oréal in 1996. Its headquarters was then moved to New York City in 1996 and its factory to Brooklyn in 2000.

== Spokesmodels ==
Maybelline received a boost when the company hired Lynda Carter as the company's beauty fashion coordinator after her television series ended; she also appeared in several of its television and print advertisements.

Josie Maran, Miranda Kerr, Sarah Michelle Gellar, Melina Kanakaredes, Zhang Ziyi, Siti Nurhaliza, Fasha Sandha, Sheetal Mallar, Julia Stegner, Jessica White and Kristin Davis have endorsed Maybelline products. The current faces of Maybelline are Adriana Lima, Christy Turlington, Charlotte Kemp Muhl, Emily DiDonato, Erin Wasson, Beatriz Shantal, Tiffany Stratton, Jourdan Dunn, Josephine Skriver, Marloes Horst, Gigi Hadid, ITZY, Liza Soberano, Urassaya Sperbund, Winnie Harlow, DJ Peggy Gou, Kiss of Life and Ten of NCT.

On March 17, 2025, it was announced that Hey! Say! JUMP's Ryosuke Yamada would be brand ambassador for Maybelline Japan's Super Stay Cream Pact Foundation. On February 10, 2026, Yamada was announced as Maybelline New York Japan's ambassador. At the event, he revealed images of a new campaign and CM for "Maybelline Super Stay Lumi Matte Liquid Foundation".

== Slogans ==
In 1981, the company adopted "Maybelline, Maybelline Ooh La La" as its advertising slogan, which was used until 1991 when the tagline changed to "Maybe she's born with it, maybe it's Maybelline" (and in some commercials as simply "...Maybe it's Maybelline."). The latter slogan was found to be the most recognizable strapline of the past 150 years by CBS Outdoor. In 2026, the slogan was changed to “Maybe. We’re born with it. Maybe. It’s Maybelline.”

=== Jingle ===
Vicki Sue Robinson is named as jingle singer in several sites. Another performer, Linda Clifford, is also credited as a jingle singer for the company. Though neither are mentioned as an specific jingle singer, it is possible that either one could have performed the "Ooh la la" jingle.

A modernized version of the jingle–adapted "Maybe it's Maybelline" slogan was performed by Miley Cyrus as she became the global spokesperson in 2025.

In 2026, Canadian artists Nicolina (Bozzo), Liz Lokre, Naomi and Tia Wood perform 4 versions of the new jingle.

== Criticism ==
In 2021, People for the Ethical Treatment of Animals (PETA) reported that Maybelline tested on animals. According to a 2010 report, however, animal testing of products is required by law in some countries to sell cosmetics.

== Collaborations ==
In January 2019, Maybelline collaborated with the German fashion brand Puma for its limited edition collection that was marketed as Maybelline X Puma. It was claimed as the multi-tasking athleisure-inspired collection and consisted of five products. Adriana Lima was chosen as the ambassador for the collaboration.

In May 2021, Maybelline collaborated with Marvel to create a limited edition that connects Marvel's most iconic characters with the brand's top-selling hero products.

In July 2025, Maybelline was announced as WWE's first official cosmetics partner as well as the presenting partner of WWE's all-female premium live event Evolution held on July 13.
