= Tom Williams =

Tom Williams or Tommy Williams may refer to:

== Sports ==
=== Football and rugby ===
- Tom Williams (American football coach) (born 1969), American former head football coach at Yale University
- Tom Williams (defensive lineman) (born 1948), American football defensive end
- Tom Williams (Australian footballer, born 1876) (1876–1938), Australian rules footballer for Essendon
- Tommy Williams (Australian footballer) (1909–1990), Australian rules footballer for Fitzroy
- Tom Williams (Australian footballer, born 1986), Australian rules footballer for Western Bulldogs
- Tommy Williams (footballer, born 1929) (1929–1979), English footballer for Tranmere Rovers
- Tommy Williams (footballer, born 1935) (1935–1967), English professional footballer
- Tommy Williams (footballer, born 1957), Scottish footballer
- Tom Williams (footballer, born 1980), English-Cypriot football player
- Tom Williams (rugby union, born 1859) (1859–1913), Welsh international rugby player and sports administrator
- Tom Williams (rugby union, born 1887) (1887–1927), Welsh rugby union player
- Tom Williams (rugby union, born 1983), English rugby union player
- Tom Williams (rugby union, born 1991), Welsh rugby union player
- Tom Williams (rugby union, born 1996), British born-Welsh rugby union player

=== Other sports ===
- Tom Williams (outfielder/pitcher) (1870–1940), baseball player
- Tom Williams (Negro leagues pitcher) (1896–1937), Negro leagues baseball player
- Tom Williams (ice hockey, born 1940) (1940–1992), American professional hockey player, 1961–1976
- Tom Williams (ice hockey, born 1951), Canadian professional hockey player, 1971–1979
- Tom Williams (racing driver), former American racing driver in 1982 24 Hours of Le Mans
- Tom Williams (swimmer), American freestyle swimmer, participated in Swimming at the Pan American Games
- Tom Williams (cricketer) (born 1992), English cricketer
- Tom Williams (boxer), see Ezra Sellers

== Arts and entertainment ==
- Tom Williams (actor) (1929–2018), American actor, Life with Lucy, Quack Pack and Return to the Planet of the Apes
- Tommy Williams (musician), jazz double bassist
- Tom Williams (music), co-founder of Attic Records
- Tom Williams (presenter) (born 1970), Australian television presenter
- Tom J Williams (born 1992), Australian Idol contestant
- Tommy Williams, fictional character in Babes on Broadway
- Tommy Williams, fictional character in The Shawshank Redemption

== Politics ==
- Tom Williams, Baron Williams of Barnburgh (1888–1967), British Labour Party politician, MP 1922–1959
- Tommy Williams (Queensland politician) (1886–1970), Australian politician
- Tommy Williams (Texas politician) (born 1956), Republican member of the Texas Senate
- Tommie Williams, American politician in Georgia
- Tom Willoams (Mississippi politician), state legislator

== Others ==
- Tom Williams (Irish republican) (1923–1942), IRA member who was hanged
- Tom Williams (bishop) (born 1948), British Roman Catholic bishop
- Tommy Williams (serial killer) (born 1970), South African serial killer

== See also ==
- Thomas Williams (disambiguation)
