= Handle It =

Handle It may refer to:

- "Handle It" (Chris Brown song), 2017
- "Handle It" (Jessica Mauboy song), 2010
- "Handle It" (Twice song), 2020
