= Kilkenny Hill =

Mountain in New York, United States of America

- Location within New York Location within the United States

Highest point
- Elevation: 1,765 feet (538 m)
- Coordinates: 42°21′01″N 75°20′06″W

Geography
- Location: Unadilla, New York, U.S.
- Topo map: USGS Unadilla

Kilkenny Hill is a mountain in the Central New York region of New York, United States. It is located northwest of Unadilla, New York. Kilkenny Hill is part of the Northern Allegheny Plateau Ecoregion.

In the mid-1800s, Colonel North built a reservoir on Kilkenny Hill. Pipe was run into Unadilla, and three fire hydrants were installed for fire protection.
