= Unadilla, New York =

- Town
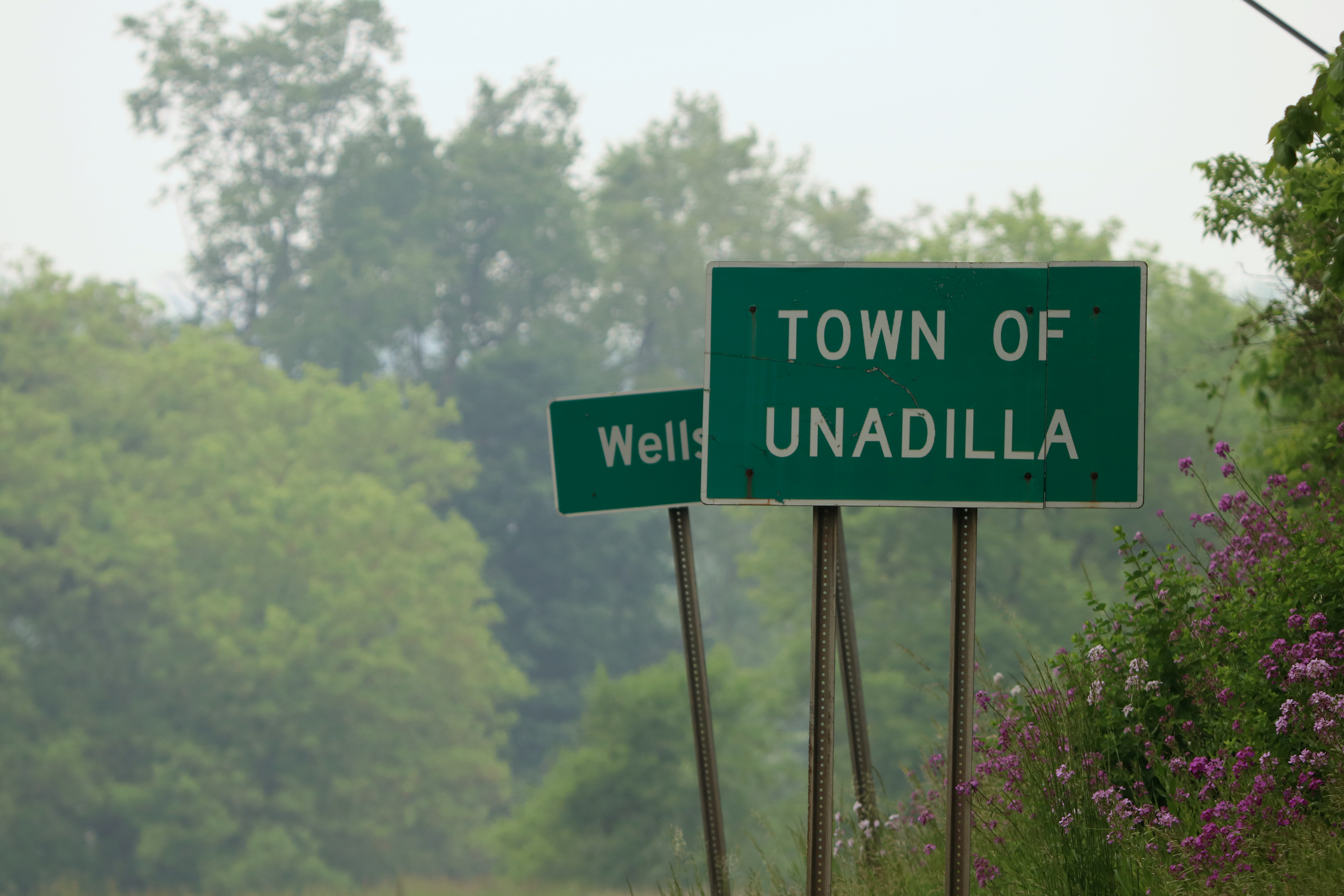
- A sign for the town of Unadilla, New York, on New York State Route 7.

- Coat of Arms

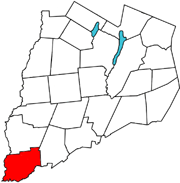
- Unadilla, Otsego County, New York
- Coordinates: 42°21′58″N 75°19′40″W
- Country: United States
- State: New York
- County: Otsego
- Settled: 1770
- Established: 1792

Government
  - Supervisor: George DeNys
  - Mayor: Jason "Jake" Cotten

Area
  - Total: 46.67 sq mi (120.88 km^{2})
  - Land: 46.27 sq mi (119.85 km^{2})
  - Water: 0.40 sq mi (1.04 km^{2}) 0.51%
- Elevation: 1,467 ft (447 m)

Population (2010)
  - Total: 4,392
  - Estimate (2016): 4,186
  - Density: 90.5/sq mi (34.93/km^{2})
- Time zone: UTC-5 (Eastern (EST))
  - Summer (DST): UTC-4 (EDT)
- ZIP code: 13849
- Area code: 607
- FIPS code: 36-76012
- GNIS feature ID: 0979571
- Website: Official website

Unadilla is a town in Otsego County, New York, United States. As of the 2023 census, the town had a population of 1,087. The name is derived from an Iroquois word for "meeting place". Unadilla is located in the southwestern corner of the county, southwest of Oneonta. The village of Unadilla is located in the southern part of the town. The mayor of the Village of Unadilla is Jake Cotten which is situated in the Town of Unadilla.

== History ==
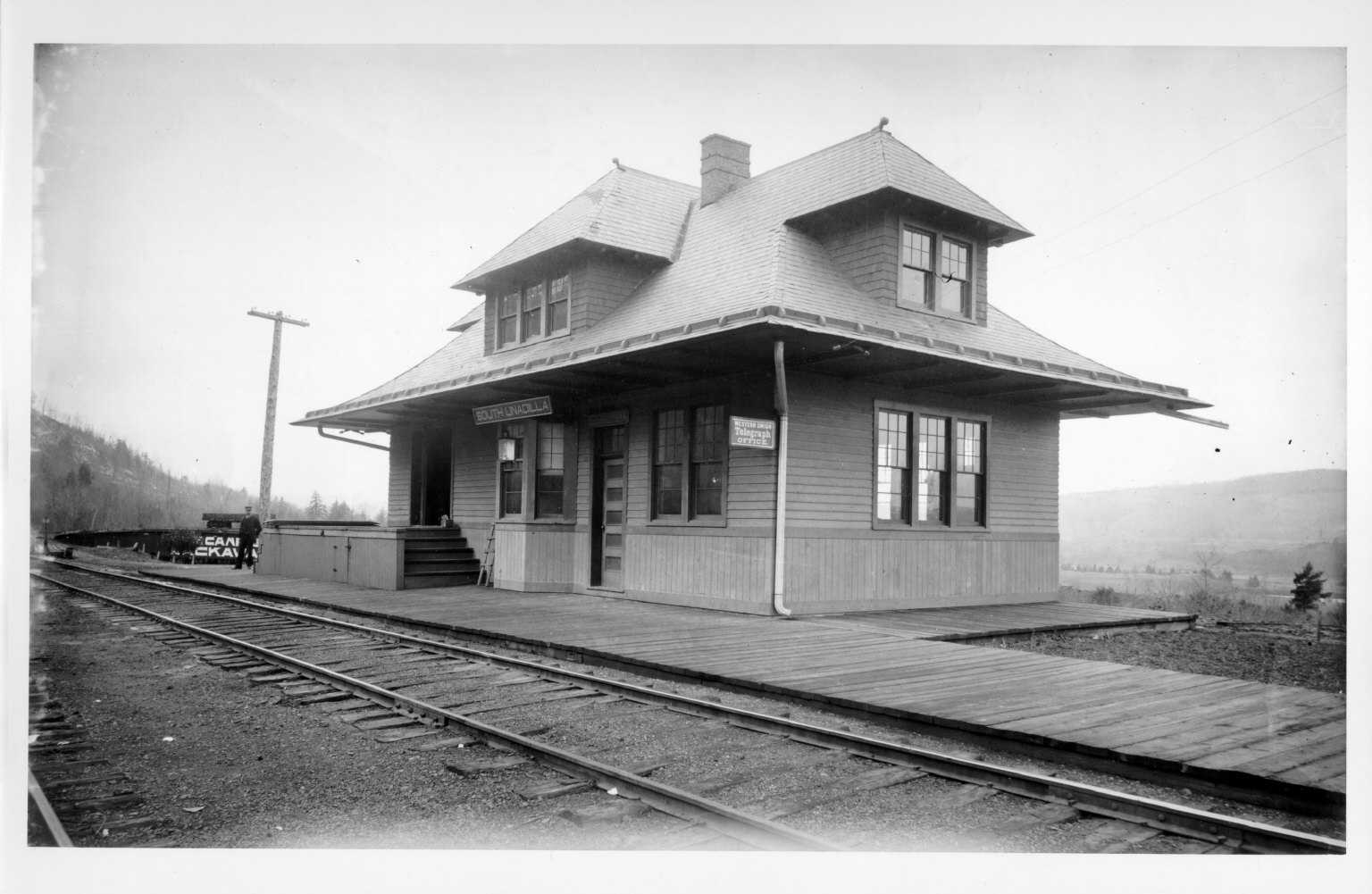
Depot in Unadilla, 1870

The first settlement took place circa 1770 in the area of Sidney (in adjacent Delaware County), followed by Unadilla. Both Sidney and Unadilla were destroyed during the American Revolution and were re-established after the war. The town was formed from part of the Town of Otsego in 1792. Later the size of the town was reduced by the formation of new towns: Butternuts, Milford, and Oneonta in 1796; Otego in 1822; and an addition to Butternuts in 1857. In 1827, the community of Unadilla set itself off from the town by incorporating as a village.

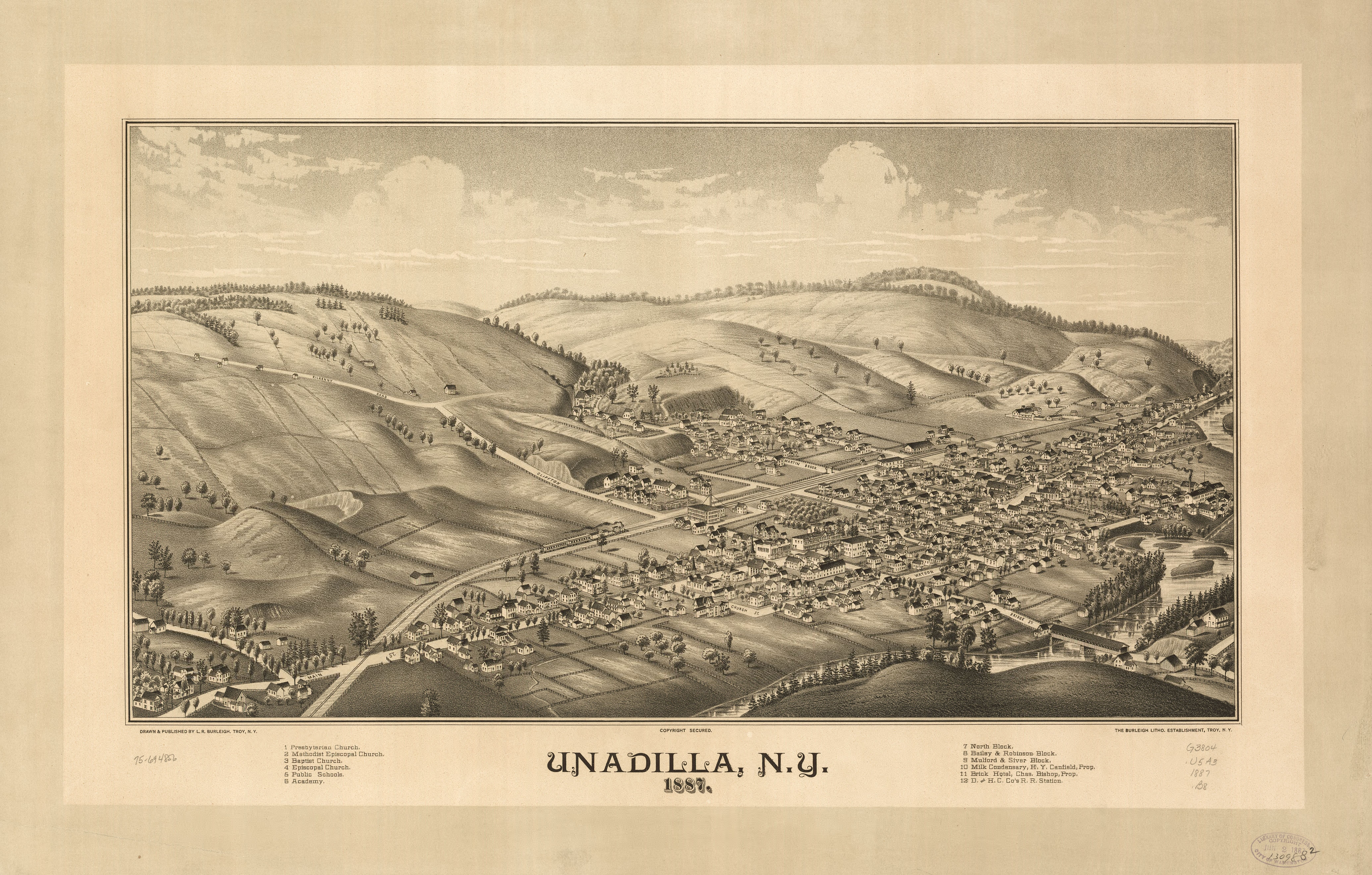
Perspective map of Unadilla and list of landmarks from 1887 by L.R. Burleigh

The Unadilla Waterworks, Russ-Johnsen Site, and Andrew Mann Inn are listed on the National Register of Historic Places.

== Geography ==
According to the United States Census Bureau, the town has a total area of 46.6 square miles (120.8 km^{2}), of which 46.4 square miles (120.2 km^{2}) is land and 0.2 square mile (0.6 km^{2}) (0.51%) is water. This includes the artificially created Buck Horn Lake.

New York State Route 7 intersects New York State Route 8 by Riverside. Interstate 88 passes briefly through the town at Unadilla village. The Unadilla River flows into the Susquehanna River at the southwestern corner of the town, west of Riverside.

=== The Unadilla town lines ===
- The northern line borders the Town of Butternuts in Otsego County.
- The eastern line borders the Town of Otego in Otsego County.
- The southern line lies along Susquehanna River, bordering the Town of Sidney in Delaware County.
- The western line lies along the Unadilla River, bordering the towns of Bainbridge and Guilford in Chenango County.

== Communities and locations in the Town of Unadilla ==
- Buckhorn Lake – A lake in the southeastern part of Unadilla.
- Buckley Corners – A location near the northern town line, west of Unadilla Center.
- Hughston Corner – A hamlet on the northern town line.
- Hutchinson Hill – An elevation east and southeast from Rockdale.
- Kilkenny Hill – An elevation located northwest of Unadilla.
- Mount Moses – An elevation in the southwestern tip of the town.
- Riverside – A hamlet on NY-7 at the Susquehanna River, opposite Sidney, New York.
- Rockdale – A location near the Unadilla River on NY-8, mostly in Chenango County.
- Rogers Hollow – A valley in the western part of the town.
- Sand Hill – A location near the eastern town line, located on Sand Creek and County Route 3A.
- Sisson Hill – An elevation northwest of Unadilla.
- South Unadilla – A hamlet southwest of Unadilla village.
- Unadilla – The Village of Unadilla is located at the southern town line on NY-7 at the Susquehanna River.
- Unadilla Center – A hamlet on County Route 3A in the northern part of the town.
- Wells Bridge – A hamlet in the southeastern corner of Unadilla on NY-7.
- Youmans Corners – A location near the eastern town line, on County Route 4.

== Demographics ==
Historical population
Census	Pop.	Note	%±
1820	2,194		—
1830	2,313		5.4%
1840	2,272		−1.8%
1850	2,463		8.4%
1860	2,702		9.7%
1870	2,555		−5.4%
1880	2,523		−1.3%
1890	2,723		7.9%
1900	2,601		−4.5%
1910	2,376		−8.7%
1920	2,395		0.8%
1930	2,276		−5.0%
1940	2,277		0.0%
1950	2,689		18.1%
1960	3,649		35.7%
1970	3,863		5.9%
1980	4,020		4.1%
1990	4,343		8.0%
2000	4,548		4.7%
2010	4,392		−3.4%
2016 (est.)	4,186	▼	−4.7%
U.S. Decennial Census

As of the census of 2000, there were 4,548 people, 1,810 households, and 1,272 families residing in the town. The population density was 98.0 inhabitants per square mile (37.8/km^{2}). There were 2,101 housing units at an average density of 45.3 per square mile (17.5/km^{2}). The racial makeup of the town was 97.14% White, 0.86% Black or African American, 0.24% Native American, 0.20% Asian, 0.02% Pacific Islander, 0.57% from other races, and 0.97% from two or more races. Hispanic or Latino of any race were 1.21% of the population.

There were 1,810 households, out of which 32.7% had children under the age of 18 living with them, 54.8% were married couples living together, 9.8% had a female householder with no husband present, and 29.7% were non-families. 23.6% of all households were made up of individuals, and 10.1% had someone living alone who was 65 years of age or older. The average household size was 2.51 and the average family size was 2.94.

In the town, the population was spread out, with 26.4% under the age of 18, 7.0% from 18 to 24, 27.1% from 25 to 44, 24.2% from 45 to 64, and 15.2% who were 65 years of age or older. The median age was 39 years. For every 100 females, there were 97.9 males. For every 100 females age 18 and over, there were 96.4 males.

The median income for a household in the town was $34,619, and the median income for a family was $40,556. Males had a median income of $29,817 versus $21,732 for females. The per capita income for the town was $16,908. About 9.6% of families and 12.8% of the population were below the poverty line, including 18.1% of those under age 18 and 6.6% of those age 65 or over.

== Notable people and horse ==
- Spectacular Bid, Milfer Farms, retired champion racehorse in the Thoroughbred Hall of Fame
- Edward S. Bragg, U.S. Representative from Wisconsin and U.S. diplomat
- Charles Waldron Buckley, former U.S. Congressman for the 2nd District of Alabama and postmaster of Montgomery, Alabama
- Thomas Carmichael, Wisconsin businessman and legislator
- Billy Decker, racing driver
- Edward Howell, former US congressman
- Sybil Ludington, American Revolutionary War figure
- Sherman Page, member of Congress and county judge
