= Billy Decker =

American Dirt Modified racing driver (born 1964)

- Born: William Decker; November 21, 1964 (age 61) Unadilla, New York

Modified racing career
- Debut season: 1981 Penn Can Speedway
- Car number: 91
- Championships: 18
- Wins: 310+

Previous series
- 2004-2013: Late model

Championship titles
- 1998, 2008, 2014 Mr. DIRTcar Super Series; 2011 Race of Champions Dirt Modified Tour

Awards
- 2008 EMPA North East Driver of the Year
- Statistics up to date as of July 31, 2024.

William Decker (born November 21, 1964) is an American dirt modified and late model racing driver. He has captured 18 track titles at six different tracks, and won at 35 different tracks in nine US states and two Canadian provinces.

== Racing career ==
Decker began his racing career in 1981 in the Tiger class at Penn Can Speedway in Susquehanna, Pennsylvania, and notched seven victories as a rookie driver. Since progressing to the Modified division, he has competed and been victorious at the east coast race tracks from Florida to Canada, including Eldora Speedway in New Weston, Ohio; The Dirt Track at Charlotte, North Carolina; and in New York at Brewerton Speedway, Fonda Speedway, the Land of Legends Raceway in Canandaigua, Utica-Rome Speedway in Vernon, and Weedsport Speedway.

Decker captured six modified pole awards and four big block victories at Super Dirt Week on the Syracuse Mile. He was the overall Super Dirt Series champion in 1998, 2008, and 2014. Decker also has over 65 Super Late Model starts with over 25 top-ten finishes, all behind the wheel of Rocket cars fielded by Gypsum Racing.

Decker was inducted into the Northeast Dirt Modified Hall of Fame in 2022.
