= Eyes Wide Open (Twice album) =

2020 studio album by Twice

- Digital cover

Studio album by Twice
- Released: October 26, 2020
- Studios: JYPE Studios (Seoul, South Korea)
- Genres: K-pop; retro-pop; dance-pop; city pop; Latin pop; R&B
- Length: 43:24
- Languages: Korean; English
- Labels: JYP; Dreamus; Republic

Twice chronology
#Twice3 (2020)	Eyes Wide Open (2020)	Taste of Love (2021)

Singles from Eyes Wide Open
- 1. "I Can't Stop Me" Released: October 26, 2020

Eyes Wide Open (stylized in sentence case) is the second Korean studio album (fourth overall) by South Korean girl group Twice. It was released on October 26, 2020, by JYP Entertainment and Republic Records. It is the group's first Korean full-length album in nearly three years, following Twicetagram (2017). The group's sophomore album features thirteen songs including the lead single, "I Can't Stop Me", and was released on the week of their fifth anniversary.

The album is primarily a pop record with elements of retro-synth, dance-pop, Japanese city-pop, and contemporary R&B genres among others. Production was handled by a wide array of producers including Melanie Fontana, Josh Record, LDN Noise, DJ Swivel, and Dua Lipa, with JYP Entertainment founder J. Y. Park serving as the album's executive producer. Members of the group participated in the production as songwriters for six out of thirteen tracks on the album. Lyrically, the album discusses themes of love, insomnia, self-confidence, self-encouragement, anxiety, and more.

Eyes Wide Open was a commercial success and received generally favorable reviews from music critics, who complimented the wide variety of music genres featured in the album as well as the group's musical growth. The album marked Twice's highest entry at the time on the US Billboard 200, peaking at number 72, and peaked at number 2 on the Gaon Album Chart. In April 2021, Eyes Wide Open received a 2× Platinum certification from the Korean Music Content Association (KMCA). The lead single, "I Can't Stop Me", peaked at number 8 on the Gaon Digital Chart, becoming the group's fourteenth top-ten single, as well as the group's third single to top the Billboard World Digital Song Sales chart. To promote the album, the group performed on several South Korean music show programs, such as M Countdown and Inkigayo.

== Background ==
Following the release of Twice's commercially successful EP, More & More (2020), reports of an upcoming comeback by the group that would be set for October 26 had been circulating on various Korean media sites. The reports were confirmed by their Korean label, JYP Entertainment, later that day. The album was announced on October 1 via Twice's official SNS accounts, along with the release date and promotional schedule. On October 6, the album's title was announced. On October 10, the tracklist and lead single "I Can't Stop Me" were revealed. The tracklist included member participation in lyrics for a number of tracks as well as participation from LDN Noise, Heize, and Dua Lipa in album's production On October 11, three group teaser images were released alongside the digital album cover.

According to leader Jihyo, the message and the title of the group's album can be written in one phrase: "Eyes wide open to a new sense."

== Composition ==
Eyes Wide Open is a 13-track album that features various genres, including dance-pop, Japanese city-pop, Latin-pop, and R&B, among others. The album's lead single "I Can't Stop Me" was written by J. Y. Park and Shim Eun-ji, and produced by Melanie Fontana and Michel "Lindgren" Schulz. The song features a synthwave genre that mixes European electronic music and American 1980s synth sounds, while lyrically depicting the boundaries of the good and bad of intractable desires. "Hell In Heaven" discusses the feeling of falling in love, comparing it to both hell and heaven. "Up No More", written by Jihyo, describes the struggles of insomnia, with the song being sonically described as bass-heavy. "Do What We Like" was penned by Sana, and is a retro-inspired dance track featuring electronic elements that details an aspiration to remember forgotten memories in a relationship. "Believer" is a EDM-inspired self-encouragement song written by South Korean songwriter Kenzie of SM Entertainment and produced by LDN Noise. "Bring It Back" and "Queen" were written by Dahyun, with the former being an R&B track with heavy electronic influence, and the latter lyrically discussing self-confidence. "Go Hard" was described as a glimpse of the aspirations behind the confidence of each Twice member. "Shot Clock" is described as a "drum (mostly snare), bass, and brass-heavy" track. "Handle It" was composed by Uzoechi Emenike and written by Chaeyoung, and lyrically depicts the feeling of being unable to accept a breakup. "Depend On You" was written by Nayeon, and was described as having a message of comfort in times of anxiety. "Say Something" heavily features Japanese city-pop accompanied with a "groovy electric guitar and bass riffs that are accented by the piano and electric synth keyboard".

English singer-songwriter Dua Lipa participated in the composition of the thirteenth track of the album, "Behind the Mask", along with South Korean singer Heize, who took hand in the songwriting.

"We tried a retro concept for the first time with this album. Our title song, 'I Can't Stop Me,' especially manifests the retro concept with the synth notes that you can hear throughout the song", Twice member Momo said of the album.

== Promotion ==
On October 17, 2020, JYP Entertainment announced in an official statement that member Jeongyeon would take a hiatus due to "psychological anxiousness", and as a result would not participate in any of the promotional activities for Eyes Wide Open.

On October 19, Twice held a special livestreaming event commemorating their fifth anniversary since debuting named "With (Twice 5th Anniversary Special)", wherein the group performed the song "Say Something", the 12th track from their upcoming studio album. The album was officially released on October 26. To promote Eyes Wide Open, the group appeared and performed on several South Korean music programs, starting with Mnet's M Countdown on October 29, wherein they performed "I Can't Stop Me" and "Up No More". They also appeared on KBS2's Music Bank, MBC's Show! Music Core, MBC M's Show Champion, and SBS's Inkigayo, to perform "I Can't Stop Me". Twice also performed the album's lead single on their United States television debut on November 30, with their appearance on the "#PlayAtHome" series of The Late Show with Stephen Colbert.

Twice made an appearance at the Time 100 Talks event held by Time magazine on January 28, 2021, where they performed the song "Depend On You".

== Critical reception ==
Professional ratings
Review scores
Source	Rating
AllMusic	3.5/5 stars
Beats Per Minute	79/100
IZM	2.5/5 stars

Writing for Beats Per Minute, Chase McMullen gave the album a score of 79/100, stating that it solidified "Twice's ever-surprising ability to evolve" and described the material as containing the group's "most sophisticated sound and presentation yet, seeing them grow beyond youthful exuberance to deliver pop with a bit more of a weathered, knowing edge". The same website included Eyes Wide Open in its "Top 50 Albums of 2020" list, ranking at number 45, with author JT Early complimenting the group's greater creative control over the album and how they tackled a variety of different genres.

The album was included by Time magazine in its "Songs and Albums That Defined K-Pop's Monumental Year in 2020" list, describing the strength of all 13 tracks and their running theme of light against darkness. Writer Kat Moon further praised Twice, stating that "even as they sing about inner turmoil, the words are expressed through sweet-toned voices and upbeat tunes—giving the listener a reassuring, revitalizing hug." Tamar Herman of the South China Morning Post included Eyes Wide Open in her "Top 15 K-pop group albums of 2020", citing on the material's emphasis on Twice's dedication to "more mature, dramatic pop perfection as the nine women seamlessly glide between a medley of genres". Billboard magazine included the studio album in its "10 Best K-Pop Albums of 2020: Critics' Picks" at number 6, describing Twice as having hit a "new artistic high" and citing the variety of genres that can be found in the material. Lai Frances of MTV News described the album as the "bigger, bolder sister of More & More" with the tracklist as being able to "take listeners on a sonic journey through space and time".

Mike Wass of Idolator included Eyes Wide Open in the music blog's "70 Best Pop Albums of 2020" list, ranking at number 41. Riddhi Chakraborty from Rolling Stone India ranked the album at number 2 in the magazine's "10 Best K-pop Albums of 2020", describing it as a "smorgasbord of hardcore drops, haunting melodies and outstanding vocal flexes", and further referring to the album as Twice's "best record to date".

Natasha Ho of the South China Morning Post Youngpost praised all 13 tracks of the album as being able to showcase the group's talent, citing the song "Depend On You" as the highlight, but was less optimistic on the track sequencing, stating that the "genre and emotion changes between songs too quickly, not giving listeners a chance to adjust."

Eyes Wide Open on year-end lists
Critic/Publication	List	Rank	Ref.
Beats Per Minute	Top 50 Albums of 2020	45	
Billboard	10 Best K-pop Albums of 2020: Critics' Picks	6	
Idolator	70 Best Pop Albums of 2020	41	
Rolling Stone India	10 Best K-pop Albums of 2020	2	
South China Morning Post	Top 15 K-pop group albums of 2020	—N/a	
Time	Songs and Albums That Defined K-pop's Monumental Year in 2020	—N/a	

== Commercial performance ==
Eyes Wide Open reached its peak position of number 2 on the weekly Gaon Album Chart on its chart issue ending October 31, 2020. The album was the 6th best-selling album for the month of October, garnering a total of 416,939 copies sold by the end of the month. Eyes Wide Open was released in the United States in December; the album subsequently debuted at number 72 on the US Billboard 200, marking the group's highest entry on the chart, surpassing More & More (2020), as well as making Twice only the third K-pop girl group to break within the top 100 of the chart, after 2NE1 and Blackpink. The album also reached number 2 on the Billboard World Albums chart and number 12 on the Billboard Top Album Sales chart. On April 8, 2021, the album received a 2× Platinum certification from the Korea Music Content Association for reaching sales of over 500,000 copies. It became the group's second release to receive a 2× Platinum certification, following More & More.

== Track listing ==
No.	Title	Lyrics	Music	Arrangement	Length
1.	"I Can't Stop Me"	J. Y. Park "The Asiansoul"; Shim Eun-ji	Melanie Fontana; Michel "Lindgren" Schulz; A Wright	Lindgren	3:25
2.	"Hell in Heaven (Note: "Hell in Heaven" contains a sample from Eyes in the Night, a 1942 film.)"	Shim Eun-ji; Lee Hae-sol	Shim Eun-ji; Lee Hae-sol; Linnea Södahl	Shim Eun-ji; Lee Hae-sol	2:59
3.	"Up No More"	Jihyo	Lee Woo-min "collapsedone"; Julia Ross; Krysta Youngs	Lee Woo-min "collapsedone"	3:34
4.	"Do What We Like"	Sana	Rod Radwagon; Grace Barker; Josh Record	Radwagon; Barker; Record	2:59
5.	"Bring It Back"	Dahyun	earattack; Gongdo; Laurell Barker; Katya Edwards	earattack; Gongdo	3:28
6.	"Believer"	Kenzie	Kenzie; Greg Bonnick; Hayden Chapman; Alice Penrose	Kenzie; LDN Noise; Penrose	3:16
7.	"Queen"	Dahyun	JinbyJin; Cazzi Opeia; Ellen Berg	JinbyJin	3:13
8.	"Go Hard"	Friday (Galactika)	Grace Tither; Carl Ryden; Ki Fitzgerald; Paul Harris	Tither; Ryden; Fitzgerald; Harris	3:01
9.	"Shot Clock"	Kim Yeon-seo	Jonatan Gusmark; Ludvig Evers; Kim Yeon-seo; Cazzi Opeia; Ellen Berg	Moonshine	3:29
10.	"Handle It"	Chaeyoung	Adrian X; Elizabeth Loughrey; Ryan Ashley; Uzoechi Emenike; Armadillo	Armadillo	2:51
11.	"Depend on You"	Nayeon	Candace Sosa; Jordan "DJ Swivel" Young; Sean R Mullen; James Kaye Miller; OranJi	Sosa; DJ Swivel; Mullen; Miller; OranJi	3:18
12.	"Say Something"	Jung Ho-hyun (e.one); Iggy	Jung Ho-hyun (e.one); Iggy	Jung Ho-hyun (e.one); Iggy	4:07
13.	"Behind the Mask"	Heize	Sam Klempner; Jacob Attwooll; Josh Record; Dua Lipa	Klempner; Attwooll	3:38
Total length:					43:30

== Personnel ==
Credits adapted from Tidal and album liner notes.

Vocals

- Twice – lead vocals
- Perrie – background vocals (tracks 1, 3)
- Sophia Pae – background vocals (tracks 2, 4–5, 8, 10–11, 13)
- Kim Yeon-seo – background vocals (tracks 6–7, 9, 13)
- earattack – background vocals (track 5)

Instrumentation

- Michel "Lindgren" Schulz – bass, synthesizer (track 1)
- Shim Eun-ji – keyboard (track 2)
- Lee Hae-sol – synthesizer (track 2)
- Lee Woo-min "collapsedone" – bass, electric piano, guitar, synthesizer (track 3)
- earattack – bass, drum, keyboard, synthesizer (track 5)
- Gongdo – bass, drum, keyboard, synthesizer (track 5)
- Armadillo – programming (track 10)
- Adam Rust – guitar (track 10)
- Adrian X – guitar (track 10)
- Jung Sang-min – keyboard (track 10)
- Lee Seong-chan – bass (track 10)
- Candace Sosa – guitar (track 11)
- Iggy – guitar (track 12)
- Jung Ho-hyun – keyboard (track 12)
- Choi Hun – bass (track 12)
- Kim So-hyun – chorus (track 12)

Production

- J. Y. Park "The Asiansoul" – executive producer
- Shim Eun-ji – vocal director (track 1)
- Julia Ross – vocal arranger (track 3)
- Krysta Youngs – vocal arranger (track 3)
- Kim Yeon-seo – vocal director (track 3, 5–11, 13)
- Rod Radwagon – producer (track 4)
- Jarly – producer (track 4)
- Sophia Pae – vocal director (track 4)
- Jordan "DJ Swivel" Young – producer (track 11)
- Sean R Mullen – producer (track 11)
- Iggy – vocal director (track 12)

Technical

- Choi Hye-jin – recording engineer (track 1–5, 7–8, 10, 13), digital editor (track 10), mixing engineer (track 1)
- Eom Se-hee – recording engineer (track 1, 6, 8)
- Lee Sang-yeop – recording engineer (track 6, 9–11), digital editor (track 1)
- Park Eun-jeong – recording engineer (track 1, 2, 8, 11–12)
- Iggy – recording engineer (track 12)
- Lee Tae-seop – mixing engineer (track 4, 7, 10, 12–13)
- Tony Maserati – mixing engineer (track 1)
- Yoon Won-kwon – mixing engineer (track 2)
- Shin Bong-won – mixing engineer (track 3)
- Master Key – mixing engineer (track 5)
- Ku Jong-pil – mixing engineer (track 6)
- Im Hong-jin – mixing engineer (track 8–9), digital editor (track 8)
- Jordan "DJ Swivel" Young – mixing engineer (track 11)
- David K. Younghyun – assistant mixing engineer (track 1)
- Chris Gehringer – mastering engineer (track 1)
- Kwon Nam-woo – mastering engineer (track 2–13)
- Michel "Lindgren" Schulz – programming (track 1)
- Shim Eun-ji – digital editing (track 2)
- Lee Woo-min "collapsedone" – programming, digital editor (track 3)
- Jeong Yu-ra – mixing engineer (track 6), digital editor (track 4–11, 13)
- Iggy – recording engineer (track 12)

== Charts ==
=== Weekly charts ===
Weekly chart performance for Eyes Wide Open
Chart (2020–2021)	Peak position
Belgian Albums (Ultratop Flanders)	176
Finnish Albums (Suomen virallinen lista)	41
Hungarian Albums (MAHASZ)	40
Japanese Albums (Oricon)	3
Japanese Hot Albums (Billboard Japan)	9
South Korean Albums (Gaon)	2
Swedish Physical Albums (Sverigetopplistan)	16
UK Album Downloads (Official Charts)	37
US Billboard 200	72
US Indie Store Album Sales (Billboard)	9
US World Albums (Billboard)	2

=== Monthly charts ===
Monthly chart performance for Eyes Wide Open
Chart (2020)	Position
Japanese Albums (Oricon)	9
South Korean Albums (Gaon)	6

=== Year-end charts ===
Year-end chart performance for Eyes Wide Open
Chart (2020)	Position
Japanese Albums (Oricon)	44
South Korean Albums (Gaon)	18

== Certifications ==
Certifications for Eyes Wide Open
Region	Certification	Certified units/sales
South Korea (KMCA)	2× Platinum	500,000^{^}
^{^} Shipments figures based on certification alone.

== Release history ==
Release formats for Eyes Wide Open
Region	Date	Format(s)	Label	Ref.
Various	October 26, 2020	Digital download; streaming	JYP; Republic	
South Korea	October 27, 2020	CD	JYP; Republic	
United States	December 4, 2020	CD	JYP; Republic	

== See also ==
- List of 2020 albums
- List of certified albums in South Korea
- List of K-pop albums on the Billboard charts
