= Andrew Mann Inn =

Historic inn in New York, United States

- U.S. National Register of Historic Places
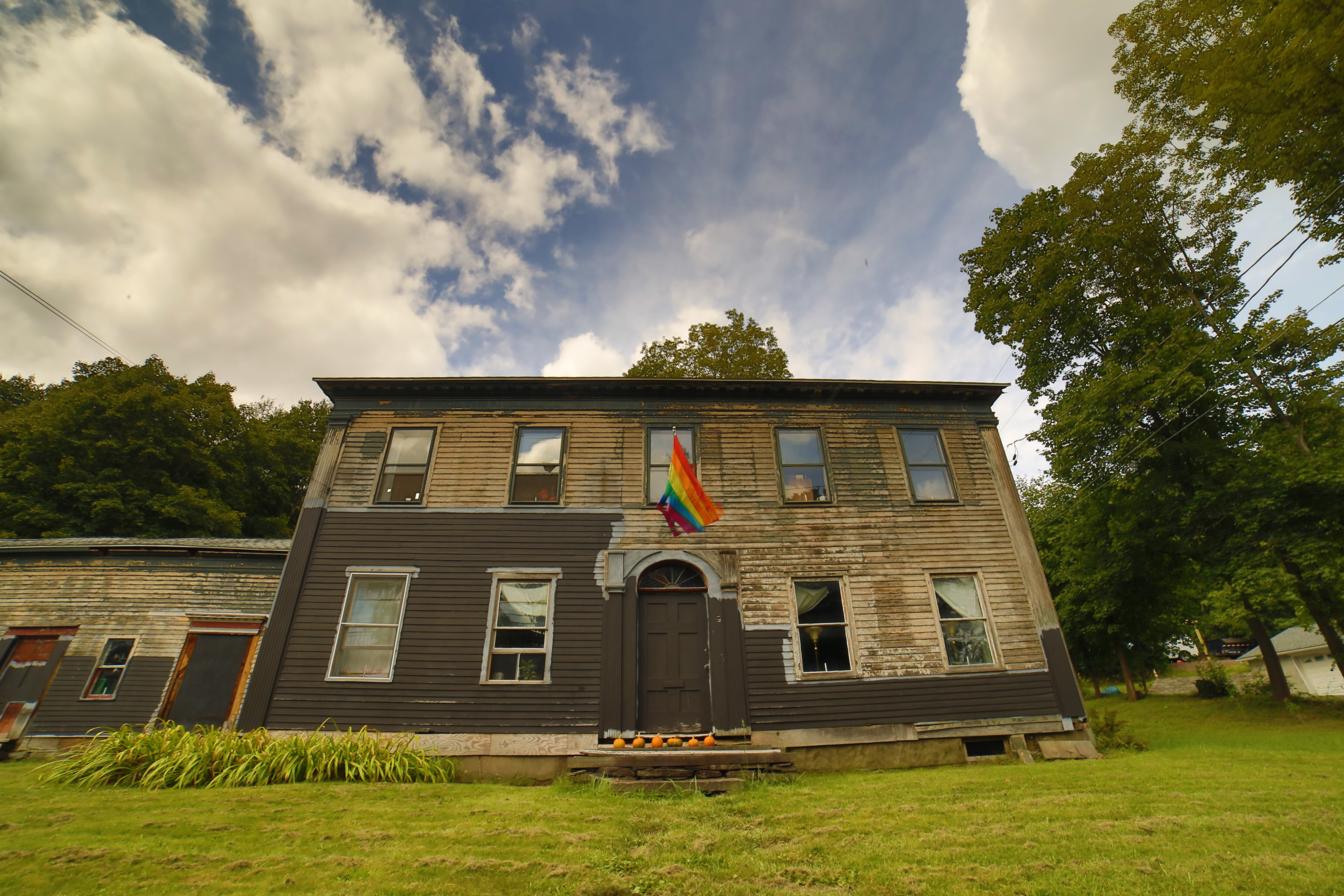

- Location within New York Location within the United States
- Location: 33 Riverside Rd., Unadilla, New York
- Coordinates: 42°19′14″N 75°23′28″W
- Area: 2.1 acres (0.85 ha)
- Built: 1795
- Architect: DeCalvin, James
- Architectural style: Georgian, Federal
- NRHP reference No.: 80002747
- Added to NRHP: January 10, 1980

Andrew Mann Inn is a historic inn located at Unadilla in Otsego County, New York. It was built as the private home of David Baits in 1787 and quickly converted into an inn in 1795. It consists of a two-story, five-bay, rectangular main section and a two-story wing. Both sections are of heavy timber-frame construction with clapboard siding. It is a well-preserved example of the transitional period between the late Georgian and Federal styles.

It was listed on the National Register of Historic Places in 1980.
