= William Sheppard (barrister) =

English barrister and legal writer

William Sheppard (died 1674) was an English barrister, known as a legal writer.

== Life ==
Sheppard was baptised at Whitminster, Gloucestershire, at the end of 1595, and entered the Middle Temple in 1620; he was called to the bar in 1629. He lived in Horsley and enjoyed a large country legal practice.

About 1653 Sheppard was invited to London by Cromwell, and made one of the clerks of the upper bench. In 1656 he became a serjeant-at-law, and was nominated with three others to prepare the charters granted to town corporations. In September 1659 he was appointed chief justice in North Wales, by the Rump Parliament.

After the Restoration of 1660 Sheppard was deprived of his offices and left public life. He had six children: John (a clergyman), Elizabeth, Sarah, Samuel, Anne, and Dorothy.

== Works ==
Sheppard wrote legal and religious works:

- The office and duties of Constables, or tythingmen … and other lay ministers. Whereunto are adjoined the several offices of church ministers and church wardens, London, 1641; 4th ed. 1657.
- The Court Keeper's Guide, London, 1641; 7th ed. by William Brown, 1685.
- A Catechism, London, 1649.
- Four Last Things, 1649. A theological work, its introduction expressed political support for the Rump Parliament, slanted against the Presbyterian faction. Of the Foure Last and Greatest Things (1658) was a collaboration with Thomas Barlow.
- Guide to Justices of the Peace, 1649; 5th ed. 1669.
- The Faithful Counsellor, London, 1651–4. An early encyclopedic work on English law, it was used in later compilations.
- England's Balme, London, 1651. A comprehensive plan for legal reconstruction. With Sir Matthew Hale and John March, Sheppard wished to reform the common law from within.
- The People's Privilege and Duty guarded against the Pulpit, London, 1652. Sheppard has been identified as a follower of John Owen; and this expression of the Independent line on preaching may have recommended him to Cromwell.
- Justice of the Peace his Clerk's Cabinet, 1654.
- The Parson's Guide or the Law of Tithes, London, 1654; 2nd ed. 1670.
- The Precedent of Precedents, London, 1655; ed. by Thomas Walter Williams, 1825.
- View of the Laws concerning Religion, London, 1655.
- Epitome of the Common and Statute Laws, London, 1656.
- Survey of the County Judicatories, London, 1656.
- Office of Country Justice of Peace, London, 1655–6.
- Concerning Sincerity and Hypocrisy, Oxford, 1658.
- Of Corporations, Fraternities, and Guilds, London.
- A New Survey of the Justice of the Peace his Office, London, 1659.
- Actions upon the Case for Slander, 1662; 2nd ed. London, 1674.
- Office of the Clerk of the Market, London, 1665.
- The Practical Counsellor in the Law, London, 1671.
- Actions upon the Case for Deeds, 2nd ed. London, 1675; 3rd ed. 1680.
- A Grand Abridgement of the Common and Statute Law of England, London, 1675.

He also published the Touchstone of Common Assurances (1641); tradition said he had found it in manuscript in Sir John Doddridge's library, but a connection with Doddridge is no longer accepted. The eighth edition of this work, by Edmond Gibson Atherley, was published in 1826. Sheppard wrote a second part, published with the first, Law of Common Assurances (1650).

A Collection of Choice Declarations (1653), attributed to Sheppard in the first edition of the Dictionary of National Biography, was by William Small.

== Notes ==
Attribution

This article incorporates text from a publication now in the public domain: Lee, Sidney, ed. (1897). "Sheppard, William (d.1675?)". Dictionary of National Biography. Vol. 52. London: Smith, Elder & Co.
