= Thomas Williams (Tehoragwanegen) =

Chief of the Kahnawake (1758–1848)

Thomas Williams (c.1758–1848), also known as Tehoragwanegen and sometimes by the alternate names Thomas Théoragwanegon or Tehora Kwanekeu, was a Haudenosaunee chief of the Kahnawake (Caughnawaga) Mohawk.

== Early life ==
Williams was born to Sara Williams and an unidentified Kahnawake man and raised within the Catholic Indigenous "Praying Indian" community that was established as Kahnawake (previously known as Caughnawaga) in Quebec. During the early years of the 1770s, he was recruited to attend the Moor's Indian Charity School across the border in New Hampshire, however he was unable to do so due to health issues that may have been smallpox.

== Life ==
In 1777, Williams became a chief of the Kahnawake; during that year he participated in battles at Saratoga, New York and Bennington, Vermont along with Indigenous allies of John Burgoyne.

In 1879, Williams married Mary Ann Rice, whose native name was Konwatewenteta (Konantewenteta).

In 1813, Thomas Jefferson asked Williams to fight with the Americans in the War of 1812.

He died at Kahnewake at the age of 90 on September 16, 1848.
