= Thomas Williams (philosopher) =

American philosopher

Education
- Education: University of Notre Dame (PhD), Vanderbilt University (BA)

Philosophical work
- Era: 21st-century philosophy
- Region: Western philosophy
- School: medieval philosophy
- Institutions: Georgetown University, University of South Florida, University of Iowa
- Website: https://www.profthomaswilliams.com/

Thomas Williams is an American philosopher and Isabelle A. and Henry D. Martin Professor of Medieval Philosophy at Georgetown University. He is known for his works on medieval philosophy.

== Books ==
- Anselm: A Very Short Introduction, Oxford University Press, 2022
- Anselm, with Sandra Visser, Oxford University Press, 2009
- The Cambridge Companion to Medieval Ethics (ed.), Cambridge University Press, 2019

=== Translations ===
- Augustine's Confessions, Hackett, 2019
- John Duns Scotus: Selected Writings on Ethics, Oxford University Press, 2017
- Anselm: The Complete Treatises with Selected Letters and Prayers and the Meditation on Human Redemption, Hackett, 2022
- Thomas Aquinas, Disputed Questions on the Virtues, E. M. Atkins (ed., trans.) and Thomas Williams (ed.), Cambridge University Press, 2005
- Anselm: Three Philosophical Dialogues, Hackett Publishing Company, 2002
