= Thomas Marvin Williams =

Mississippi state senator

Member of the Mississippi State Senate from the 22nd district
- In office January 1952 – April 1967

Personal details
- Born: February 15, 1890 Indian Territory, U.S.
- Died: April 30, 1967 (aged 77) Meridian, Mississippi, U.S.

Thomas Marvin Williams Sr. (February 15, 1890 – April 30, 1967) was a politician who served in the Mississippi Senate, representing Holmes County, between 1952–1968. Official records indicate that he was born in Mena, Arkansas, but in his handwritten, unpublished memoir, he states that he was actually born in Indian Territory, a fact that, until late in life, he kept a secret. He was president of the State Extension Workers Association. During his final Senate term, Williams was the chairman of the Senate's Agriculture Committee.

== Early life ==
Born in Indian Territory to John David Williams and Mollie Elizabeth Campbell, Williams spent most of his childhood and youth moving from place to place in southwestern Arkansas and southeastern Oklahoma as his father worked various jobs such as railroad construction, coal mining, and farming. Williams graduated from Third District Agricultural School in Magnolia, Arkansas. He later attended Kansas State Agricultural College earning a bachelor's degree in Agriculture.

== Adult Life ==
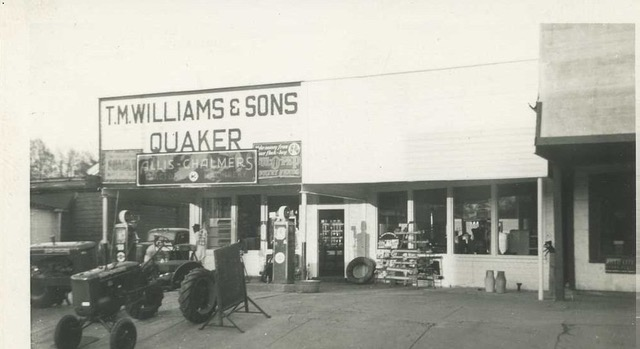
T. M. Williams & Sons Feed and Seed store, Lexington, Mississippi

In 1926 he moved to Lexington, Mississippi, where he worked as the Holmes County, Mississippi Agricultural Extension Agent. In the 1930s he opened T. M. Williams & Sons Feed and Seed store in Lexington.

== Death ==
Williams died April 30, 1967 at Rush Foundation Hospital in Meridian, Mississippi, of prostate cancer which had metastasized to his lungs and other organs and was buried in Magnolia Cemetery in Meridian.
