= Thomas Walter Williams =

English barrister and legal writer

Thomas Walter Williams (1763–1833) was an English barrister, known as a legal writer.

== Life ==
He was the son of Walter Williams, a London attorney living in Lamb's Conduit Street, and entered St Paul's School, London on 6 November 1772. He then studied law and was called to the bar, but was not much known as a pleader, his reputation mainly deriving from his writings. He died in 1833.

== Works ==
Williams wrote:

- A Compendious Digest of the Statute Law from Magna Charta to 27 George III, London, 1787; 3rd edit. 1809, 2 vols.; supplements in 1809 and 1812.
- Original Precedents in Conveyancing, London, 1788–1792, 4 vols.; new edit. 1808. Williams is described as of the Inner Temple.
- The whole Law relative to the Duty and Office of a Justice of the Peace, London, 1793–5, 4 vols.; 3rd edit., by Harold Nuttall Tomlins, 1812, 4 vols.
- An Abridgment of Cases argued and determined in the Courts of Law during the Reign of George III, London, 1798–1803, 5 vols.
- The Practice of the Commissioners, Assessors, and other Officers under the Acts relating to the Assessed Taxes, London, 1804.
- A General Dictionary of the Law, London, 1812; new edit. 1816.
- The Jurisdiction and the Duties of Justices of the Peace, and Authority of Parish Officers in all matters relating to Parochial Law, London, 1812, 2 vols.; new edit. 1817.
- A Compendious and comprehensive Law Dictionary; elucidating the terms and general principles of Law and Equity (1816)
- The Farmer's Lawyer, London, 1819.

Williams also edited the Law Journal between 1804 and 1806 with John Morgan, produced abstracts of acts of parliament, and in 1825 brought out a new edition of The Precedent of Precedents by William Sheppard.

== Notes ==
Attribution

This article incorporates text from a publication now in the public domain: Lee, Sidney, ed. (1900). "Williams, Thomas Walter". Dictionary of National Biography. Vol. 61. London: Smith, Elder & Co.
