= Thomas J. Williams =

Union Army general

Thomas J. Williams (1838 – November 18, 1866) was a Union Army officer during the American Civil War.

Thomas J. Williams was born at Paterson, New Jersey in 1838. He was a bookkeeper before the Civil War.

Williams served as a captain with the 23rd Regiment Kentucky Volunteer Infantry, beginning December 16, 1861. He was discharged on January 1, 1865. On March 1, 1865, he was appointed a major of the 55th Regiment Kentucky Volunteer Mounted Infantry. He was promoted to lieutenant colonel, March 23, 1865. He was mustered out of the volunteers on September 19, 1865. He was appointed a brevet colonel, to rank from September 22, 1865.

On January 13, 1866, President Andrew Johnson nominated Williams for appointment to the grade of brevet brigadier general of volunteers, to rank from September 22, 1865, and the United States Senate confirmed the appointment on March 12, 1866.

Thomas J. Williams died at Covington, Kentucky, November 18, 1866. He was buried at Spring Grove Cemetery, Cincinnati, Ohio.

== See also ==
- List of American Civil War brevet generals (Union)
