= Thomas Edward Williams (politician) =

American politician (1849–1931)

Thomas E. Williams
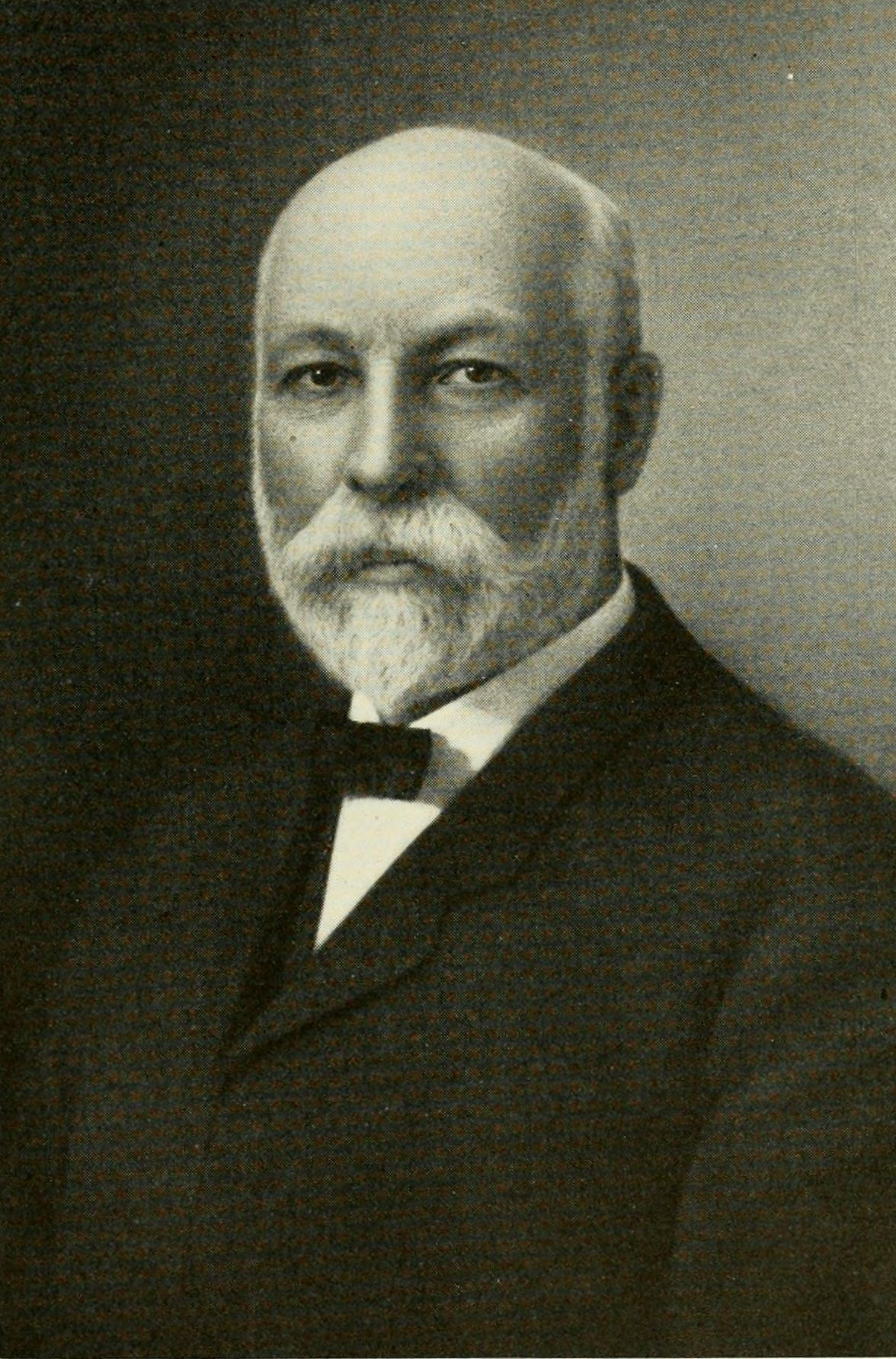
- From History of Hamilton and Clay Counties, Nebraska (1921)

3rd Tax Commissioner of Nebraska
- In office January 8, 1925 – January 3, 1929
- Governor: Adam McMullen
- Preceded by: William H. Smith
- Succeeded by: Harry W. Scott

Member of the Wisconsin State Assembly from the Eau Claire district
- In office January 5, 1885 – January 3, 1887
- Preceded by: Thomas Carmichael
- Succeeded by: Syver E. Brimi

Personal details
- Born: March 23, 1849 Mayville, Wisconsin, U.S.
- Died: January 5, 1931 (aged 81) Fontana, California, U.S.
- Resting place: Aurora Cemetery, Aurora, Nebraska
- Party: Republican
- Spouses: Alida J. Kemp (m. 1873; died 1899); Susanna Eliza Sirwell (m. 1904; died 1929)
- Children: none
- Education: Cornell University
- Occupation: Teacher, banker

Thomas Edward Williams (March 23, 1849 – January 5, 1931) was an American banker, educator, and pioneer of Wisconsin and Nebraska. He was a member of the Wisconsin State Assembly, representing Eau Claire County during the 1885 session, and later served as the 3rd tax commissioner of Nebraska (1925–1929).

His name was incorrectly listed as John Edward Williams in the 1885 Wisconsin Blue Book, and that error propagated to subsequent editions of the Blue Book, including recent historic lists of past legislators. A comparison of the biography of "John Edward Williams" from the 1885 Blue Book with the biographies of "Thomas Edward Williams" from History of Northern Wisconsin (1881) and History of Hamilton and Clay Counties, Nebraska (1921) and the obituaries of "Thomas E. Williams" from 1931 clearly demonstrates that all of these biographies are describing the same person.

== Biography ==
Thomas Williams was born in Mayville, Wisconsin, in March 1849. As a child, his parents moved from Mayville to the town of Portland, Dodge County, Wisconsin, in 1853, and then to the town of Dell Prairie, Wisconsin, in Adams County, in 1856. They finally moved to Eau Claire, Wisconsin, in 1863, when Thomas was 14 years old. He attended high school in Eau Claire, and then attended Cornell University for three years. In 1873, he moved to the neighboring city of Augusta, Wisconsin, where he served as superintendent of schools for eleven years. He moved back to Eau Claire, Wisconsin, in 1883 and opened a furniture store.

He was elected to the Wisconsin State Assembly in 1884, and represented Eau Claire County in the 37th Wisconsin Legislature. He was not a candidate for re-election in 1886.

He moved to Aurora, Nebraska, in 1888. There he bought a stake in the Farmers & Merchants Bank, and became cashier and manager of the bank. The bank was consolidated with the Hamilton County Bank in 1890, and Williams continued as cashier of the merged bank. After another series of mergers, Williams became cashier of the First National Bank of Aurora, and then served as president of the bank from 1909 until he retired and sold his interest in 1917.

Williams was a stalwart Republican throughout his life. He was a delegate to the 1908 Republican National Convention, which nominated William Howard Taft for president. He also served on the Republican slate of presidential electors for the 1916 United States presidential election, but his state voted for the Democratic slate.

At the start of the administration of Nebraska governor Adam McMullen, in 1925, Williams was appointed state tax commissioner, and served in that role until McMullen left office in 1929.

After a period of poor health, Williams planned a trip to California to try to improve his condition. He died at Fontana, California, in January 1931.

== Personal life and family ==
Thomas Edward Williams was one of seven children born to George W. and Malinda (née Streeter) Williams. His parents came to the Wisconsin Territory from New York state in 1844, with their parents, and married after arriving in Wisconsin.

Thomas Williams married twice. His first wife was Alida J. Kemp; they married on August 2, 1873, in Eau Claire. She died in June 1899. Williams subsequently married Susanna Eliza Sirwell of St. Louis, on December 21, 1904. His second wife died in 1929. He had no children.

== Electoral history ==
=== Wisconsin Assembly (1884) ===
Wisconsin Assembly, Eau Claire District Election, 1884
Party	Candidate	Votes	%	±%
General Election, November 8, 1884
Republican	Thomas E. Williams	3,365	49.88%	+19.26%
Democratic	Emmet Horan	2,278	33.77%	
Independent	William F. Bailey	1,103	16.35%	
Plurality		1,087	16.11%	-5.62%
Total votes		6,746	100.0%	-32.32%
Republican gain from Democratic				

Wisconsin State Assembly
Preceded by Thomas Carmichael	Member of the Wisconsin State Assembly from the Eau Claire district January 5, 1885 – January 3, 18875	Succeeded by Syver E. Brimi
Government offices
Preceded by William H. Smith	Tax Commissioner of Nebraska; January 8, 1925 – January 3, 1929	Succeeded by Harry W. Scott
