= Tom Williams (rugby union, born 1887) =

Wales international rugby union footballer

- Williams in Welsh cap and blazer
- Born: Thomas Williams c. 1887 Dunvant, Wales
- Died: 13 August 1927 (aged 39–40) Swansea, Wales

Rugby union career
- Position: Flanker
Amateur team(s)
Years	Team	Apps	(Points)
- Swansea RFC
International career
Years	Team	Apps	(Points)
1912-1914	Wales	6	(3)

Tom Williams (c.1887 - 13 August 1927) was a Welsh international forward who played club rugby for Swansea. He won six caps for Wales. Williams was a member of the 'Terrible Eight', the nickname of the Wales pack from 1914.

== Personal history ==
Williams was born in Dunvant, Swansea circa 1887. During the First World War he was a captain in the Royal Engineers. He served as a member of the Gower Rural District Council from 1925 until his death in 1927.

== Rugby career ==
Williams came to note as a rugby player when he joined Swansea. Williams was first selected for Wales as part of the 1912 Five Nations Championship team. He turned out on 9 March 1912 against Ireland at the Balmoral Showgrounds, in a match Wales lost 12–5. Two weeks later he played his second and last game for Wales, this time at Rodney Parade against France. Although Wales won the game, it was seen as far too close a match and eight members of the Welsh team played their last Five Nations Championship game. Williams impressed enough to return for the next season and played against France in the 1913 Championship scoring his one and only international try during the game. His final tournament was during the 1914 Championship where he turned out against England, Ireland and Scotland. The match against Ireland in 1914 is seen as one of the most notoriously violent games in international rugby union, and Williams and the rest of the Welsh pack were dubbed the 'Terrible Eight' for their rough style of play.

=== International matches played ===
Wales

- England 1914
- France 1913, 1914
- Ireland 1912, 1914
- Scotland 1914

== Bibliography ==
- Jenkins, John M.; Pierce, Duncan; Auty, Timothy (1991). Who's Who of Welsh International Rugby Players. Wrexham: Bridge Books. ISBN 1-872424-10-4.
- Smith, David; Williams, Gareth (1980). Fields of Praise: The Official History of The Welsh Rugby Union. Cardiff: University of Wales Press. ISBN 0-7083-0766-3.
