= Thomas Carmichael =

American politician

Member of the Wisconsin State Assembly
- In office January 1874 – January 1875
- Succeeded by: Jonathan G. Callahan
- Constituency: Eau Claire County

Member of the Wisconsin State Assembly
- In office January 1877 – January 1878
- Preceded by: Hobart Stocking
- Succeeded by: Julius Ingram
- Constituency: Eau Claire County

Member of the Wisconsin State Assembly
- In office January 1882 – January 1883
- Preceded by: Ira B. Bradford
- Succeeded by: John Edward Williams
- Constituency: Eau Claire County

Member of the Wisconsin State Assembly
- In office January 1883 – January 1884
- Preceded by: Thomas Carmichael
- Succeeded by: John Edward Williams
- Constituency: Eau Claire County

Personal details
- Born: October 12, 1830 Kings County, Ireland
- Died: October 13, 1902 (aged 72) Eau Claire, Wisconsin, U.S.
- Party: Democratic; Liberal Reform; Anti-Monopoly; Union Labor; Populist
- Occupation: Lumberman, politician

Military service
- Allegiance: United States
- Branch/service: Union Army
- Rank: First Lieutenant
- Unit: 10th Wisconsin Light Artillery Battery; 37th Wisconsin Volunteer Infantry Regiment
- Battles/wars: American Civil War; Battle of Corinth; Battle of Murfreesboro

Thomas Carmichael (October 12, 1830 – October 13, 1902) was an Irish-American lumberman and politician from Eau Claire, Wisconsin, who spent four discontinuous terms as a member of the Wisconsin State Assembly.

== Background ==
Carmichael was born in Kings County, Ireland on October 12, 1830 and was educated in the Irish National Schools. He emigrated to the United States in 1851, becoming a lumberman and settling for some time in Unadilla, New York, before moving in 1857 to Wisconsin, and eventually settling in Eau Claire.

Upon the outbreak of the American Civil War, he helped fund a company for the 17th Wisconsin Volunteer Infantry Regiment, but they were not organized in time to enlist in the 17th. He and the 35 men he had enlisted left for St. Louis, where they joined the 10th Wisconsin Light Artillery Battery, with Carmichael becoming a private. He took part in sieges and battles at Corinth, Murfreesboro, Tennessee, and several minor battles in which the Army of the Cumberland was involved up to the surrender of Chattanooga. He was promoted to 1st Lieutenant in the newly-organized 37th Wisconsin Volunteer Infantry Regiment, and served on recruiting and other detached service until he was discharged in October 1864, due to an unspecified illness from which he never fully recovered.

== Public office ==
Upon the 1872 organization of the City of Eau Claire, Carmichael became alderman for his Ward; he also served on the Eau Claire County Board of Supervisors. He was a delegate to the 1873 Democratic state convention, and was elected that year to the Assembly's Eau Claire County seat as a member of the Liberal Reform Party (a short-lived coalition of Democrats, reform and Liberal Republicans, and Grangers which secured the election of one Governor of Wisconsin, as well as electing a number of state legislators), defeating Republican William P. Bartlett with 1,065 votes to 851 for Bartlett. He was assigned to the standing committees on lumber and manufactures; and on the militia. He did not run for re-election, and was replaced the next year by Republican Jonathan G. Callahan.

In 1876 he was once again elected to the Assembly, this time as a Democrat, with 2,101 votes to 1,905 for Republican C. C. Miller (Republican incumbent Hobart Stocking was not a candidate). He was assigned to the standing committee on state affairs. He was not a candidate for re-election in 1877, and was succeeded by Republican Julius Ingram.

In 1880 he was the Democratic candidate for his old seat, losing to Republican incumbent Ira B. Bradford with 1725 votes to Bradford's 2,263. In 1881, Bradford was not a candidate, and Carmichael, the Democratic nominee, reclaimed his old seat with 1872 votes to 1,147 for Republican N. C. Foster. He was assigned to the committee on privileges and elections. In 1882 he was re-elected, not as a Democrat but as an anti-monopoly candidate, with 1,165 votes, to 1062 for Republican John Hunner, 795 for the Democratic nominee L. R. Larson, and 446 for Prohibitionist C. R. Kellerman. He chose to join the Democrats in the Assembly, and was not only assigned once more to the committee lumber and manufactures but assigned as its chairman. He was not a candidate for re-election in 1883, and was succeeded by Republican John Edward Williams.

== After his last term ==
Carmichael was selected a delegate to the 1884 state Democratic convention. He remained active as a lumberman (the legislature being very much a part-time occupation in that era); but was also much in demand as a speaker at pro-labor events. and was considered a spokesman for the "workingmen" faction within the Democratic Party (who did not, in his stated opinion, need or want to run a third party at this time) and for the labor movement.

As of 1890 he had apparently given up on the Democratic Party; in that year, he ran for the Eau Claire Assembly seat again, as a Union Labor candidate, coming in third in a four-way race. In 1892, with Eau Claire having been divided into two districts, he ran in the first district as a Populist, coming in fourth in another four-way race.

In 1896 he was among the members of the Wisconsin unit of the Silver Party who supported the endorsement of the Democratic/Populist electoral fusion strategy and nomination of William Jennings Bryant.

== Death and aftermath ==
Carmichael died on the afternoon of October 13, 1902 in Eau Claire. He left an extensive estate, including land in nine Wisconsin counties, the city of Eau Claire, Itasca County, Minnesota, and Brown County, South Dakota, valued at US $60,000. Some time in 1902, three former business associates of Carmichael's discovered that he had left a single living relative, an elderly sister living in Edenderry, Ireland. One of them, John A. Jacobs, travelled to Ireland and purchased the sister's rights in the estate for £2,620. The information was cabled to the United States, and the trio obtained court orders blocking any sale of lands in the Carmichael estate. The subsequent lawsuits would be tied up in courts through 1909.
