= Thomas Williams (1779–1876) =

American Congregationalist minister and author

Thomas Williams (November 5, 1779 – September 29, 1876) was an American Congregationalist minister and author.

Williams was born in Pomfret, Connecticut on November 5, 1779, the son of Joseph and Lucy (Witter) Williams.

He entered the freshman class of Williams College in the fall of 1795, and continued there until March 1798. In the succeeding fall he entered the junior class of Yale College, where he graduated in 1800. Before graduation he had begun to teach, and after successive engagements in Beverly, Massachusetts, and in Woodstock and Norwich, Connecticut, he opened a school for African-American pupils in Boston in the spring of 1803.

While thus employed he was licensed to preach, May 17, 1803, by the Windham County Association, in order that he might officiate as chaplain in the almshouse in Boston, in connection with his other duties. Late in the same year he gave up his school, and served for some weeks as a missionary preacher in New York State. On his return, and after spending six weeks with Rev. Dr. Emmons, of Franklin, Massachusetts (his entire course of theological preparation), he was ordained as an evangelist at Killingly, Connecticut on May 16, 1804.

Two other missionary tours to New York succeeded, and in the summer of 1806 he supplied the pulpit of the Congregational Church in Branford, Connecticut. In January 1807, without formal installation, he took charge of the Pacific Congregational Church in Providence, R. I., where he continued until April 1816. He was next installed pastor, on November 6, 1816, of the church in Foxborough, Massachusetts, which he served for about four years. In July, 1821, he returned to his former charge in Providence, and remained with them until August, 1823. In Dec, 1823, he began to preach for the First Church in Attleboro, Massachusetts, and was installed there on September 29, 1824, with Dr. Emmons preaching the sermon, as well as at his former installation. From this church he was dismissed on December 11, 1827; and at the same time a new church was formed in Hebronville, in the southern part of the town, of which Williams became at once the pastor, without formal installation, and so continued until April 1830, when he removed to Providence, after which he was employed for four or five years in occasional preaching through the state. From May 1835 to March 1838 he preached statedly to the Congregational Church in Barrington, R. I., his last regular engagement.

In 1839-40 he resided in Hartford, Connecticut, and then for three years in East Greenwich, R. I., whence he returned to Providence, where his residence continued until his death. During all these years, until extreme old age, he was restlessly employed in his calling, preaching as he found opportunity over a wide circuit. His last appearance in the pulpit was in 1872, when in his 93rd year. He died in Providence on September 29, 1876, aged 97 years lacking 36 days, of old age, with no indication of disease. For upwards of 13 years he had been the last survivor of the Yale class of 1800 and since March 1873, the sole living Yale graduate of the eighteenth century.

He was married on May 20, 1812, to Ruth, daughter of Isaac and Ruth (Jewett) Hale, of Newbury (old town), Massachusetts. She died in Providence on March 7, 1867, in her 79th year. They had seven children, four sons and three daughters, of whom three sons survived him, one of whom, Nathan, graduated Yale in 1842 and became a Congregationalist preacher in Shrewsbury, Massachusetts.

His published writings comprise some thirty sermons and discourses.
