= Thomas Lyle Williams =

American businessman (1896–1976)

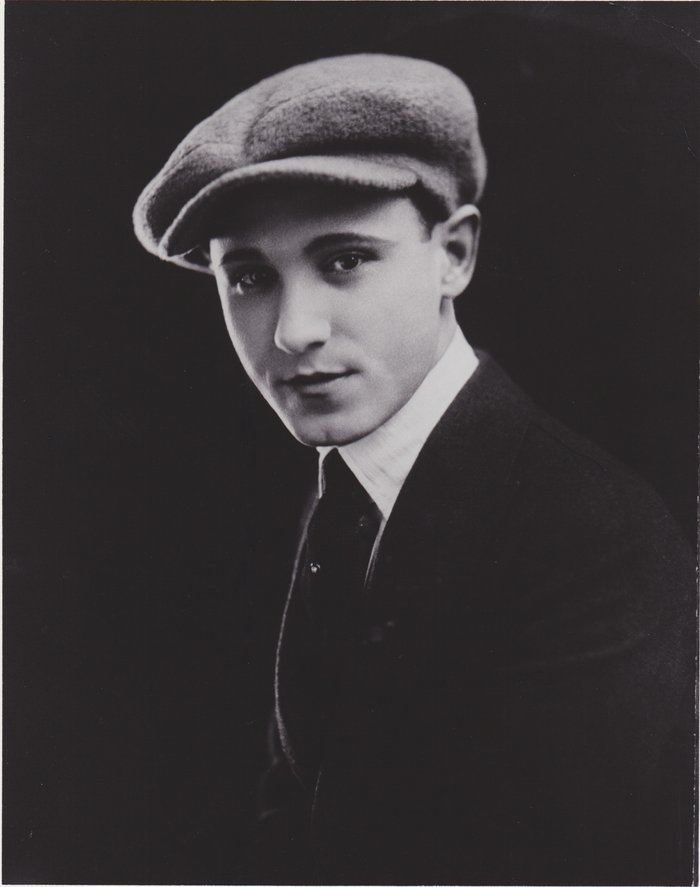
- Thomas Lyle Williams Sr at age 18
- Born: January 19, 1896; Morganfield, Kentucky
- Died: September 26, 1976 (aged 80); Los Angeles, California
- Occupations: Cosmetician, business executive
- Known for: Founder of Maybelline

Thomas Lyle Williams Sr (January 19, 1896 – September 26, 1976) was an American cosmetician and business executive. He was the founder of cosmetic firm The Maybelline Company.

== Early life and family ==
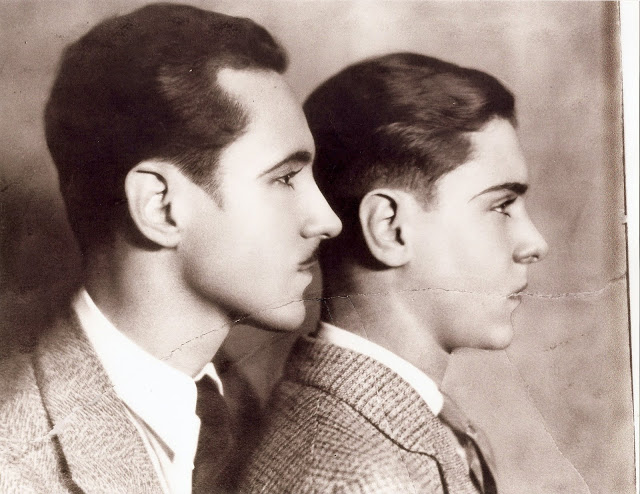
Thomas Lyle Williams Sr with his 14-year-old son, Thomas Lyle Williams Jr., in 1926

Thomas Lyle Williams Sr. was born in Morganfield, Kentucky, in 1896 to Thomas "TJ" Jefferson and Susan Williams. In 1912, he married Bennie Gibbs, with whom he had one son, Thomas Lyle Williams Jr (1912–1978), who was to become the General Partner at Williams Investments and President at Maybelline Co, Chicago. The marriage did not last long, however, and after it was annulled, Williams moved to Chicago and there met Emery Shaver (September 15, 1903 – October 22, 1964), who was working part-time in advertising while studying literature at University of Chicago.

== Career ==
In Chicago, Williams first went to work for Montgomery Ward, a firm printing a mail-order catalog founded in 1872. After Montgomery Ward, he opened his own mail-order business.

In 1915, Williams, then 19 years old, seeing his sister Mabel using a homemade mixture of petroleum jelly, coal dust and burnt cork to darken her eyelashes, had the idea to create a commercial product to enhance the eyes. His own attempt was not a success but then he commissioned a drug manufacturer, and the resulting product was something that he could sell: the Lash-Brow.

In 1917 Williams started producing eyebrow beautifier and cake eyelash, calling the product Maybelline, inspired by his sister Mabel. Maybelline was the first mascara produced in America. In 1929 Williams expanded the production to eye shadow and eyebrow pencils.

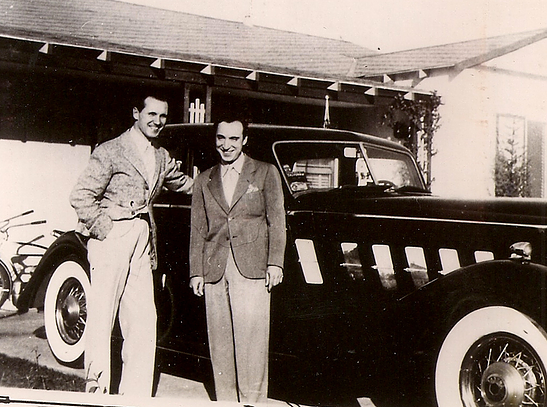
Tom Lyle Williams and Emery Shaver

After World War II Maybelline became an international venture. Williams moved to California with his life partner, Emery Shaver. They bought Rudolph Valentino's house in the Hollywood Hills. Shaver and Williams were in charge of advertising for the company, and in particular, Shaver contracted the movie stars of the time to promote Maybelline products. The headquarters of Maybelline remained in Chicago. When Shaver died in 1964, Williams was deeply affected by the loss. He sold the business in 1968. In 2001, Maybelline became "Maybelline New York".

== Death ==
Williams died in Los Angeles, California in 1976. He and Shaver are buried together in the Columbarium of Memories at Forest Lawn Memorial Park, Glendale, California.

== Sources ==
- Williams, Sharrie; Youngs, Bettie (2011). The Maybelline Story: And the Spirited Family Dynasty Behind It. SCB Distributors. ISBN 978-1-936332-17-5.
