= Lokre =

Canadian singer-songwriter

LOKRE
- Also known as: Liz Lokre
- Born: Elizabeth Loughrey; Toronto, Canada
- Genres: R&B; pop
- Occupations: Singer-songwriter; record producer
- Years active: 2016–present
- Label: Platoon
- Website: www.iamlokre.com

LOKRE is the stage name of Elizabeth Loughrey, a Canadian singer, songwriter, and producer. She released her debut single in 2016 and gained recognition through her early releases and social media presence. Lokre’s debut studio album, Elizabeth (2022), received attention for its exploration of her cultural heritage and collaborations with international artists. In addition to her work as a performer, she has co-written songs for artists including Twice, Tamar Braxton and Ari Lennox.

== Early life ==
Elizabeth Loughrey was born in Toronto, Canada, to a family of immigrants. Her mother is from Trinidad and Tobago, while her father is of Irish descent. Both of her parents were involved in the arts: her father booked live entertainment at his local irish pub, and her mother worked internationally as a dancer specializing in Indian dance styles. Her grandmother was among the early dancers in the Bollywood film industry.

Loughrey was introduced to music at an early age. She studied vocal performance and took lessons in guitar and piano. At the age of 12, she began singing in church and started participating in music competitions across North America, winning several of them. During her high school years, she began recording her first original songs and started traveling between Los Angeles and Toronto, where she later met producer Adrian X, with whom she began writing and composing her first songs.

== Career ==
=== Early releases (2016–2020) ===
Lokre’s career began in 2016, when she debuted under the name Liz Loughrey with the release of her first single, Rise Up, published on September 26, 2016. The song was recorded in Miami and produced by Adrian X and Supa Dups. The single gained attention online and achieved significant visibility on social media, in part due to the hashtag #RiseUpTheMovement. On May 25, 2017, Lokre released her second single under the name Liz Lokre, Buh Bye, produced by Adrian X and Jordan Reyes. Later the same year, she released the holiday-themed single Believe.

In 2018, Lokre began traveling between the United States and Europe while working on her debut album. On September 14, 2018, she released the single Stop Runnin.

In 2019, she released three singles. The first, Help Myself, was written in London in collaboration with Ryan Ashley. The second single, “Wait on Me,” was released in June 2019. On October 10, 2019, she released “No Doubt,” for which she collaborated with Director X on the accompanying music video.

In 2020, Lokre co-wrote the song Handle It by Twice, which was created during her time in London following a studio session with Adrian X, Ryan Ashley, and MNEK. In the same year, she signed a publishing deal with Spirit Music Group. Throughout 2020, Lokre released a trilogy of EPs: Earth in January, Water in April, and Fire in October.

=== Debut album: Elizabeth (2022–2023) ===
In 2022, following a yearlong hiatus, Lokre released her debut studio album, Elizabeth, on September 16, 2022, in collaboration with Platoon for distribution. The album consists of 11 original tracks and serves as a tribute to the immigrant backgrounds of her parents. It concludes with a spoken-word poem written and performed by Dominique Christina.

The album was preceded by three singles: Sun Don’t Set, released on June 22, 2022, followed by Something From Nothing in July 2022, and Finish Line. Lokre wrote and recorded the album across multiple cities, including Toronto, London, Los Angeles, and Miami.

Elizabeth was executive produced by Adrian X, with co-production by Brian West and Jordan Ullman. The album was written entirely by Lokre, with additional songwriting contributions on select tracks from Gary Go, Curtis Richardson, Ryan Ashley, and David Lale.

In 2023, Lokre embarked on an international tour to promote the album, performing across North America and Europe as a supporting act for Jonathan Roy.

=== Songwriting career (2024–present) ===
Following the tour, Lokre began collaborating with producer REO and released the single Body in 2024. In the same year, she started traveling between Toronto and Atlanta, where she developed a close working relationship with producer Tricky Stewart.

Through this collaboration, Lokre co-wrote The Gift for Tamar Braxton, featured in the film Sarah's Oil, and Cool Down for Ari Lennox.

In June 2026, during an interview on Ebro's Apple Music show, Tricky Stewart introduced his collaborative project with Lokre, The Prayers, and played the singles "Maybe It's Magic" and "If You Won't Dance". In September 2026, Lokre was selected as one of the Canadian artists featured in Maybelline's new campaign. On the occasion of the campaign, the single "Maybe It's Magic" was released.

== Discography ==
=== Album ===
- 2022 — ELIZABETH

=== EPs ===
- 2020 — EARTH
- 2020 — WATER
- 2020 — FIRE

=== Singles ===
- 2016 — Rise Up!
- 2017 — Buh Bye
- 2017 — Believe
- 2018 — Stop Runnin'
- 2019 — Help Myself
- 2019 — Wait on Me
- 2019 — No Doubt
- 2022 — Sun Don't Set
- 2022 — Something From Nothing
- 2022 — Finish Line
- 2024 — Body
- 2026 - Maybe its Magic

== Songwriting Discography ==
- 2020 — Twice — Handle It
- 2025 — Tamar Braxton — The Gift
- 2026 — Ari Lennox — Cool Down
- 2026 — Tolou — Into Me
