= 2017 AMA National Motocross Championship =

The 2017 AMA Motocross Championship season is the 45th AMA Motocross National Championship season, the premier motocross series in USA. Ken Roczen goes into the season as the defending champion in the 450 class after taking his second national title in 2016. In the 250 class Cooper Webb is the defending champion after taking his maiden title last season.

== Calendar and Results ==
=== 450cc ===
Round	Date	Location	Race 1 Winner	Race 2 Winner	Round Winner
1	May 20	(California) Hangtown Motocross Classic	(United States) Eli Tomac	(United States) Eli Tomac	(United States) Eli Tomac
2	May 27	(California) Glen Helen National	(France) Marvin Musquin	(United States) Jason Anderson	(France) Marvin Musquin
3	June 3	(Colorado) Thunder Valley National	(United States) Justin Bogle	(United States) Blake Baggett	(United States) Blake Baggett
4	June 17	(Pennsylvania) High Point National	(United States) Blake Baggett	(United States) Eli Tomac	(United States) Blake Baggett
5	June 24	Tennessee National	(United States) Jason Anderson	(United States) Eli Tomac	(United States) Eli Tomac
6	July 1	(Michigan) Red Bud National	(United States) Eli Tomac	(United States) Eli Tomac	(United States) Eli Tomac
7	July 8	(Massachusetts) Southwick National	(United States) Eli Tomac	(United States) Eli Tomac	(United States) Eli Tomac
8	July 22	(Minnesota) Spring Creek National	(France) Marvin Musquin	(France) Marvin Musquin	(France) Marvin Musquin
9	July 29	(Washington (state)) Washougal National	(France) Marvin Musquin	(France) Marvin Musquin	(France) Marvin Musquin
10	August 12	(New York (state)) Unadilla National	(France) Marvin Musquin	(France) Marvin Musquin	(France) Marvin Musquin
11	August 19	(Maryland) Budds Creek National	(United States) Justin Bogle	(United States) Eli Tomac	(United States) Justin Bogle
12	August 26	(Indiana) Ironman National	(Netherlands) Jeffrey Herlings	(Netherlands) Jeffrey Herlings	(Netherlands) Jeffrey Herlings

=== 250cc ===
Round	Date	Location	Race 1 Winner	Race 2 Winner	Round Winner
1	May 20	(California) Hangtown Motocross Classic	(United States) Zach Osborne	(United States) Zach Osborne	(United States) Zach Osborne
2	May 27	(California) Glen Helen National	(United States) Jeremy Martin	(France) Dylan Ferrandis	(United States) Zach Osborne
3	June 3	(Colorado) Thunder Valley National	(United States) Alex Martin	(United States) Joey Savatgy	(United States) Joey Savatgy
4	June 17	(Pennsylvania) High Point National	(United States) Zach Osborne	(United States) Jeremy Martin	(United States) Jeremy Martin
5	June 24	Tennessee National	(United States) Aaron Plessinger	(United States) Zach Osborne	(United States) Aaron Plessinger
6	July 1	(Michigan) Red Bud National	(United States) Jeremy Martin	(United States) Zach Osborne	(United States) Zach Osborne
7	July 8	(Massachusetts) Southwick National	(France) Dylan Ferrandis	(United States) Zach Osborne	(United States) Zach Osborne
8	July 22	(Minnesota) Spring Creek National	(United States) Joey Savatgy	(United States) Zach Osborne	(United States) Joey Savatgy
9	July 29	(Washington (state)) Washougal National	(United States) Aaron Plessinger	(United States) Joey Savatgy	(United States) Joey Savatgy
10	August 12	(New York (state)) Unadilla National	(United States) Joey Savatgy	(United States) Jeremy Martin	(United States) Jeremy Martin
11	August 19	(Maryland) Budds Creek National	(United States) Adam Cianciarulo	(United States) Zach Osborne	(United States) Adam Cianciarulo
12	August 26	(Indiana) Ironman National	(United States) Zach Osborne	(United States) Zach Osborne	(United States) Zach Osborne

== 450 Class ==
=== Entry list ===
Team	Constructor	No	Rider	Rounds
Monster Energy Yamalube Yamaha	Yamaha	2	(United States) Cooper Webb	1–8, 10–12
Monster Energy Kawasaki	Kawasaki	3	(United States) Eli Tomac	All
Monster Energy Kawasaki	Kawasaki	33	(United States) Josh Grant	1–7
Rocky Mountain ATV	KTM	4	(United States) Blake Baggett	All
Rocky Mountain ATV	KTM	34	(United States) Benny Bloss	8–12
Rocky Mountain ATV	KTM	70	(United States) Dakota Alix	All
Team Chiz Extreme Honda	Honda	11	(United States) Kyle Chisholm	11–12
HRC Honda	Honda	14	(United States) Cole Seely	All
HRC Honda	Honda	48	(United States) Christian Craig	1–2, 4, 6–12
Rockstar Energy Husqvarna	Husqvarna	15	(United Kingdom) Dean Wilson	All
Rockstar Energy Husqvarna	Husqvarna	21	(United States) Jason Anderson	1–8
Rockstar Energy Husqvarna	Husqvarna	30	(Ecuador) Martin Davalos	1–11
RCH Yoshimura Suzuki	Suzuki	19	(United States) Justin Bogle	All
RCH Yoshimura Suzuki	Suzuki	20	(United States) Broc Tickle	1–6
RCH Yoshimura Suzuki	Suzuki	43	(United States) Matt Bisceglia	8–12
Red Bull KTM	KTM	25	(France) Marvin Musquin	All
Red Bull KTM	KTM	41	(United States) Trey Canard	5–6
Red Bull KTM	KTM	784	(Netherlands) Jeffrey Herlings	12
Team Mafia Moto Crew	Kawasaki	27	(United States) Nicholas Wey	6
Autotrader JGR Suzuki	Suzuki	32	(United States) Weston Peick	All
Autotrader JGR Suzuki	Suzuki	37	(United States) Phillip Nicoletti	10–12
Autotrader JGR Suzuki	Suzuki	51	(United States) Justin Barcia	1–9, 12
Precision Site Work Honda	Honda	40	(Sweden) Fredrik Noren	All
Traders Racing	Honda	49	(Venezuela) Anthony Rodriguez	10–11
Traders Racing	Yamaha	285	(United States) Tony Archer	11
	Kawasaki	52	(United States) Tyler Bowers	9
	KTM	58	(United States) Christopher Alldredge	9
Got Gear Motorsports	Yamaha	68	(United States) Heath Harrison	1–3, 5–9, 11–12
Fly Racing Yamaha	Yamaha	75	(United States) Nick Schmidt	2
Fly Racing Yamaha	Yamaha	339	(United States) Bryan Bachman	4–6
Fly Racing Yamaha	Yamaha	559	(United States) Dylan Merriam	2, 8–9
SLM Racing	KTM	77	(United States) Ben LaMay	11–12
Triggr Racing	Yamaha	81	(United States) Henry Miller	5–12
TPJ Racing	Yamaha	88	(United States) John Short	4–12
TPJ Racing	Suzuki	181	(United States) Dustin Pipes	4–6, 8–10
TPJ Racing	KTM	329	(United States) Chad Gores	2–4, 6, 9
TPJ Racing	Kawasaki	868	(South Africa) Michael Docherty	4–7
Nut Up Industries	Kawasaki	90	(United States) Dillan Epstein	1–2
Pilgrim Powersports	Kawasaki	95	(United States) AJ Catanzaro	7
Honda of Houston	Honda	96	(United States) Vann Martin	5–6, 8–12
Honda of Houston	Honda	470	(United States) Kyle Hopkins	10
Coastal Racing Husqvarna	Husqvarna	97	(United States) Thomas Sipes	4
MPH WMXtreme KTM	KTM	98	(United States) Matt Babbitt	10
MPH WMXtreme KTM	Honda	696	(United States) Nick Kraeger	7, 10
CDR Yamaha	Yamaha	111	(Australia) Dean Ferris	4
Advanced Concrete	Honda	120	(United States) Todd Bannister	3–4
Crownkiwi Enterprises	Honda	121	(New Zealand) Cody Cooper	1–2
HD Supply Husqvarna	Husqvarna	125	(United States) Josh Mosiman	All
Lane Racing	Suzuki	134	(United States) Nicholas Lane	11
LaPorte Flooring	Yamaha	139	(United States) Nathen LaPorte	3–6, 12
Carl's Cycle Sales	Kawasaki	140	(United States) Austin Kouba	1–3, 8–9
Sportland 2	Kawasaki	143	(United States) Zach Coons	4, 6, 8
Sportland 2	Honda	936	(United States) Joshua Philbrick	3, 8
RSMX	Suzuki	144	(Uruguay) Nicolas Rolando	1–3, 9
Team Tedder	Kawasaki	151	(United States) Dakota Tedder	All
STR Yamaha	Yamaha	154	(United States) Brandon Scharer	All
Crosley Radio KTM	KTM	157	(United States) Jacob Baumert	3
Tacoma Motorsports	Honda	161	(United States) Todd Carlson	9
Bonanza Plumbing	Honda	167	(United States) Zach Bell	1–2
Highland Trails Racing	KTM	168	(United States) Cale Kuchnicki	4, 7–8, 12
Fusion Motorsports	Honda	170	(United States) Zack Williams	1–6, 8–9, 11–12
Boron Brothers Racing	KTM	190	(United States) Matt Boron	7, 10
	Honda	207	(United States) Dare DeMartile	9
Barr Custom Cutters	Suzuki	213	(United States) Jon-Murray Barr	6–7
Haeseker Racing Engines	Yamaha	215	(United States) Christian Cicero	1–2
Maxima Racing	Husqvarna	224	(United States) Edgar Foedish III	1–3
Gilliam Racing	KTM	227	(United States) Cory Gilliam	4–7, 10–12
	Yamaha	228	(United States) Donny Brown	4
DCR	KTM	237	(United States) David Costa	7, 10
Barrett Heritage Racing	Honda	240	(United States) Bryce Stewart	1–4, 7, 10
Valley Motorsports	Honda	242	(United States) Shawn MacDonald	7, 10
	Yamaha	244	(United States) Justin Hoeft	2, 9
Privateer Racing League	KTM	245	(United States) Quiton Camp	12
TJ's Cycle	KTM	250	(United States) Forrest Player	3
	Honda	251	(United States) Kyle Gills	9
ZR1 Suspension Husqvarna	Husqvarna	254	(United States) Cody Briner	3
Slo-Joe Racing	Honda	257	(United States) Joey DeNeen	4
	KTM	262	(United States) Connor Pearson	1–3
Fratz-Orr Racing	KTM	265	(United States) Nick Fratz-Orr	4–12
Canvas MX	Honda	267	(United States) Harrison West	4, 8
Runkles Racing	Yamaha	270	(United States) Jacob Runkles	4–8, 10–12
Millsaps Training Facility	Yamaha	274	(United States) Tom Flintrop	7–8, 12
SUBS27 Husqvarna	Husqvarna	279	(Brazil) Thales Vilardi	1–2
	KTM	281	(United States) Max Tannenbaum	4–5
Outlaw Motorsports	Kawasaki	282	(United States) Theodore Pauli	4–6, 8, 10–12
Blizzard Racing	Honda	287	(United States) John Snow	4–6, 12
	Husqvarna	293	(United States) Michael Ashe	7, 11
	Suzuki	301	(United States) Nicholas Ferrell	11
Plainview Powersports	Kawasaki	308	(United States) Nicholas Jackson	3, 6, 8, 12
Smith Racing	Yamaha	309	(United States) Jeremy Smith	4, 6–7, 10
	Kawasaki	311	(United States) Mitchell Gifford	2–3
Holeshot Cycles	Honda	312	(United States) Chris Makuta	4, 7, 10
Cycle Trader Yamaha	Yamaha	314	(United States) Alex Ray	2, 9
Glory Hills MX	Honda	316	(United States) Drew Craven	12
Central Mass Powersports	Suzuki	317	(United States) Richard Tolman-Moschetti	7
Diamond Motorsports	Honda	319	(United States) Cody Schock	7
	Kawasaki	321	(Zambia) Bradley Lionnet	3, 6–7
Cooper Racing	Yamaha	324	(United States) James Cooper	4–7, 10, 12
Yamaha Korea	Yamaha	327	(South Korea) Jae Lee	2
Mountain Motorsports	KTM	330	(United States) Cade Autenrieth	8
Pasha Racing	Suzuki	331	(United States) Justin Muscutt	2
Pasha Racing	Honda	595	(United States) Dominic DeSimone	2
Hand Racing	Honda	332	(United States) Jeremy Hand	4, 6–11
	Kawasaki	333	(New Zealand) Rhys Carter	1–2
Yamaha of Redlands	Yamaha	335	(United States) Jeremy McCool	1–2
Custom MX Supply	Yamaha	345	(United States) Joshua Prior	6–7
Phoenix Racing	Kawasaki	349	(United States) Alex Sigismondi	10
Alias MX	Honda	351	(United States) Eric Grondahl	6–7, 10–12
Kamm Racing	KTM	353	(United States) Kody Kamm	6–8
TrueMX	Suzuki	356	(United States) Daniel Lippman	4, 10–11
Motovate Performance	Yamaha	366	(United States) Thomas Addy	10
	KTM	368	(United States) Stephen Czarnota	7
	Honda	369	(United States) Jason Astudillo	10
Manchester Honda KTM	KTM	376	(United States) Chris Canning	7
Brennan Racing	Yamaha	383	(United States) Casey Brennan	1–3
	Kawasaki	388	(United States) Brandan Leith	9
	Husqvarna	393	(United States) Curren Thurman	3
Tomahawk MX	Kawasaki	395	(United States) Tyler Stepek	10–11
Peterson Racing	Honda	399	(United States) Broc Peterson	4–6
1 Stop Motorsports	Kawasaki	401	(United States) Samuel Redman	4–6, 8, 10, 12
Dad Factory Racing	Kawasaki	402	(United States) Samuel Greenawalt	4, 12
	Yamaha	405	(United States) Joe Lafalce	2–3, 11
FCC Motosports	KTM	407	(United States) Benjamin Nelko	4–6, 10–11
Flyin Taco Racing	Yamaha	409	(United States) Carlos Short	4–5, 7
Five Star Powersports	KTM	412	(United States) Jared Lesher	4, 6, 8, 10–12
Five Star Powersports	Honda	823	(United States) Logan France	3–4, 7, 11–12
Tech Care Honda	Honda	413	(United States) Konnor Buffis	7
Grgurich Racing	Yamaha	415	(United States) Brendan Grgurich	4, 6, 8
Tri County Honda	Honda	437	(United States) Charles Bright	11
	Yamaha	440	(United States) John Weaver	6, 12
	Honda	442	(United States) Zachary Johnson	7
Geeleher Enterprises	Honda	445	(United States) Conor Sheridan	7
RJC Racing	Kawasaki	447	(United States) Deven Raper	1–2, 9
C & D Motorsports	Yamaha	453	(United States) Jordan Reynolds	3, 9
Motowhips	KTM	455	(United States) Justin Ashburn	4–5
CDH Construction	Yamaha	456	(United States) Jacob Grove	10–11
	Suzuki	461	(United States) Thomas Richards	1–2, 9
A1 Vacuum	Honda	467	(United States) Forrest Smith	3, 5, 12
Impens Racing	Honda	472	(United States) Jake Impens	7, 10–11
	Suzuki	473	(United States) Jake Rathjen	9
Scouten Racing	KTM	475	(United States) Timothy Scouten	4, 6
RF Motorsports USA	Kawasaki	476	(United States) Collin Jurin	9
Coen Racing	Honda	479	(United States) James Coen	7, 10
RMX Honda	Honda	482	(United States) Riley Brough	1–3, 5–9
RMX Honda	Honda	544	(United States) Morgan Burger	1–3, 5–6, 9
Legend Services Racing	Honda	499	(United States) Bryant Humiston	3, 9
Nagy Racing	Suzuki	509	(United States) Alexander Nagy	2–4, 6, 8, 10
	Honda	510	(United States) Travis Prier	8, 12
Roth Racing	Yamaha	514	(United States) Anthony Roth	10
Zitterkopf Racing	Yamaha	522	(United States) Cole Zitterkopf	5
	KTM	527	(United States) Matthew Hammer	7, 10
	Yamaha	528	(United States) Ryan Peters	6, 8
Privateer Racing League	Honda	530	(United States) Bodie Wood	8
	Yamaha	532	(United States) Rocky Cagno	4, 7, 10
Freistat Racing	Honda	534	(United States) Travis Freistat	1–2
VPE Yamaha	Yamaha	538	(United States) Addison Emory	3, 5, 8, 11–12
International Motorsports	Kawasaki	539	(United States) Ricky Dietrich	9
	Honda	541	(United States) Richard White	7, 10–11
Buller Racing	Suzuki	542	(United States) Johnnie Buller	2
Siler Racing	Yamaha	545	(United States) Cody Siler	6
Rob's Performance	Honda	546	(United States) Tylor Skodras	6, 8, 11–12
Defy Graphics	Honda	550	(United States) John Citrola	3, 8
Defy Graphics	Yamaha	985	(United States) John Fortner	3, 8
Patch Master Racing	Honda	553	(United States) Brent Rouse	1–3, 5–8
FCC Motorsports	Honda	558	(United States) Jerry Robin	10–11
Brill Racing	Honda	564	(United States) Bryten Brill	6, 8, 12
	Kawasaki	566	(United States) Jacob Rose	5
Bitterman Racing	Kawasaki	581	(United States) Kyle Bitterman	5
3D Racing	Yamaha	588	(United States) Jon Borrello	7
G-Force Powersports	Honda	589	(United States) Claude Olson	3
	Kawasaki	592	(Ecuador) Andres Benenaula	11
Team Tickle	Honda	596	(United States) Carson Tickle	4–7, 10–12
Two Tire Take Over	Yamaha	600	(United States) Connor Olson	3, 5, 11
Big Twin Motorcycles	Husqvarna	602	(United States) Joel Barnowski	9
	KTM	604	(United States) Robert McConnell	5
Team MicroBilt	Suzuki	606	(United States) Ronnie Stewart	All
Endriss Racing	Yamaha	607	(United States) Kyle Endriss	4, 7, 10–11
609 Compound	Honda	609	(United States) Bradley DePrenger	3
Rock Roofing	KTM	610	(United States) Rody Schroyer	6, 12
CrankyApe.com	Honda	613	(United States) Nick Schnagl	8
	Honda	616	(United States) Chase Ray	8, 10–12
Imagetech	Honda	620	(United States) Brad Nauditt	9
Blue Buffalo	Yamaha	622	(United States) Zac Maley	4–8, 10–12
Blue Buffalo	Yamaha	880	(United States) Cole Robbins	6–7, 10–11
Motorbikesplus KTM	KTM	626	(United States) Matthew Desjardins	7
Haeseker Racing	KTM	636	(United States) Keith Knight	9
	Honda	637	(United States) Robert Piazza	4–6, 10–11
SSB Motorsports	Yamaha	644	(United States) Brennan Myers	8, 12
Harmon Racing	Suzuki	645	(United States) Cheyenne Harmon	1–4, 9–10
Rocket Valley Motorsports	Yamaha	647	(United States) Ryan Lechien	4
Peters Racing	Yamaha	652	(United States) Luke Peters	6, 8
Schmoke Motorsports	KTM	670	(United States) Dylan Schmoke	1–3
On the Pipe Racing	Suzuki	684	(United States) Justis Heckendorf	6, 8, 11–12
	Honda	688	(United States) Gabe Woodrow	7, 10–11
Tenkom Motorsports	Kawasaki	708	(United States) Joseph Perron	3, 6, 8, 12
Dreisbach Racing	Yamaha	710	(United States) Dominick Dreisbach	4, 7, 10–11
Team Lane Racing	KTM	711	(United States) Tristan Lane	7, 11
Team Honda HRC	Honda	718	(Japan) Toshiki Tomita	2–12
Sun Powersports	Honda	721	(United States) Tanner Stolz	3
Five Star Cycle	KTM	724	(United States) Jason McConnell	4, 6, 10–11
	Suzuki	727	(United States) Bradley Esper	4–5, 8
Bugbee Racing	KTM	729	(United States) PJ Bugbee	10
Hillview Motorsports	Suzuki	731	(United States) Steve Roman	4
McBride Racing	KTM	732	(United States) Josh McBride	9
Powersports 1	Husqvarna	738	(United States) Kyle Hameister	6, 8, 12
Stemteck USA	Kawasaki	743	(Italy) Nicolo Gobbi	1–2, 9
	Suzuki	744	(United States) Tom Giambrone	10–11
Stevenson Racing	Honda	746	(United States) Chase Stevenson	3
Moto-Fresh	Honda	753	(United States) Derik Brewster	3
DT-1 Filters	Honda	755	(United States) Todd Smith	5, 11–12
Team Weeck	Honda	757	(United States) Tommy Weeck	9
Shondeck Racing	KTM	768	(United States) Cole Shondeck	2–3, 11
Roseville Yamaha	Yamaha	771	(United States) KJ Mckenzie	1–3, 9
Roseville Yamaha	Yamaha	917	(United States) Drew Thomas	1–3, 9
Ramtrax Racing	KTM	774	(United States) Robert Marshall	7
Kenny G's Performance Tuning	KTM	776	(United States) Ryan Dowd	7, 11
Triple Seven Motorsports	Husqvarna	777	(United States) Tristan Titus	5, 7
Fasthouse	Honda	787	(United States) Blayne Thompson	2, 9
789 Racing Crew	Yamaha	789	(Bolivia) Marco Antezana	11
Zeigler Motorsports	Honda	793	(United States) Dillon Finley	6
Leininger Brothers Racing	Honda	795	(United States) Aaron Leininger	4–6, 10–12
Bidus Racing	Yamaha	796	(United States) Michael Bidus	4–6
Southeast Sales	Kawasaki	811	(United States) Vaughn Mays	6, 8
Retro Fitness	Yamaha	813	(United States) Aaron Lampi	4, 7, 10–11
TNT Appliances	KTM	821	(United States) Trevor Tate	4, 6, 12
MAD Racing	Husqvarna	825	(United States) Zach Peddie	1–2
FXR Racing	KTM	827	(United States) Blake Ovitt	10
	Suzuki	829	(United States) Taylor VanBeek	11
	Suzuki	830	(United States) Mason Price	7, 11
	Yamaha	839	(United States) Joren Berry	5, 10–12
Championship Powersports Racing	Honda	841	(United States) Jeffrey Walker	4, 6, 8
Narelli Racing	Suzuki	844	(United States) Dylan Narel	4, 7–8
Gdogg Racing	Honda	850	(United States) Cody Slark	6, 8
Wood Ya	Honda	853	(United States) Alger Morrison	6
Motor Bikes Plus	KTM	859	(United States) Alex Higley	4, 6–7, 10
Montreuil Racing	KTM	861	(United States) Eric Montreuil	6
MX Heaven	Yamaha	866	(Sweden) Andreas Ovgard	9
	Yamaha	875	(United States) Blake Rivard	6
Reactive Lifestyle	Yamaha	878	(United States) Eric McKay	10–11
Lorenz Racing	Yamaha	881	(United States) Gerald Lorenz III	4, 6–8
	Yamaha	882	(United States) Austin Morrison	5
	Yamaha	883	(United States) Bryan Sabbaugh	3
Team 887	Honda	886	(United States) Shane Kelleher	7
Ridersville Cycle KTM	KTM	887	(United States) Thomas Coluzzi	5, 10–11
CJ Racing	Yamaha	889	(United States) Cody Williams	7, 11
	Yamaha	891	(United States) Kyle Koosmann	8
	KTM	894	(United States) Dwight Dillon	3, 9
Uebrick Racing	Yamaha	899	(United States) Kevin Uebrick	7, 10
Smith Racing	Yamaha	909	(United States) Jacob Smith	3, 5–6, 9
NPR 4 Autism	Suzuki	911	(United States) Jesse Frassetto	12
Pro Action KTM	KTM	918	(United States) Michael Akaydin	5, 8, 11–12
	Yamaha	920	(United States) Alex Wagers	5
Team Babbitt's	KTM	921	(United States) Isaac Teasdale	3–8, 11–12
Championship Powersports Racing	Honda	924	(United States) Greg Durivage	5–6
KTM Canada	KTM	926	(Canada) Kaven Benoit	1
Porter Racing	Honda	927	(United States) Jamal Porter	4–5, 7
Buyit Reality	KTM	932	(United States) Jared Schudel	5
	Suzuki	941	(Italy) Angelo Pellegrini	1–2
CKdesignz Racing	Honda	942	(United States) Colton Karl	8, 12
Trimbles Cycle Center	Honda	943	(United States) Nate Kohnke	8, 12
James Flooring & Construction	Honda	946	(United States) Dillon James	9
Netti Racing	Yamaha	947	(United States) Daniel Netti	11
Team Five Four Racing	Honda	954	(United States) Matthew Hougentogler	11
Weisenberger Racing	Husqvarna	955	(United States) Jaden Weisenberger	6
Land N' Sea Powersports	Kawasaki	956	(United States) Austin Phelps	7
Excavating Associates	Yamaha	957	(United States) Jarrett Thompson	4–5
	Yamaha	961	(United States) Mario Testa	4–5, 7, 10–12
MM Racing	Husqvarna	975	(United States) Jake Loberg	8, 11–12
Maus Racing	Yamaha	979	(United States) Philip Maus	6–8, 11–12
Politelli Racing	Yamaha	981	(United States) Austin Politelli	1
TiLube Buddy Brooks Racing	Honda	993	(United States) Austin Wagner	4–6, 8, 10–12
Sanchez Racing Team	Honda	994	(United States) Juan Sanchez	7, 10–11
Team LMR	KTM	998	(United States) Chris Lykens	7

=== Riders Championship ===
Pos	Rider	Bike	HAN (California)		GLN (California)		THU (Colorado)		HIG (Pennsylvania)		TEN (Tennessee)		RED (Michigan)		SOU (Massachusetts)		SPR (Minnesota)		WAS (Washington (state))		UNA (New York (state))		BUD (Maryland)		IRN (Indiana)		Points
1	(United States) Tomac	Kawasaki	1	1	2	19	7	2	12	1	2	1	1	1	1	1	2	5	2	2	10	5	7	1	5	6	470
2	(France) Musquin	KTM	2	2	1	3	4	3	16	6	7	Ret	3	3	4	Ret	1	1	1	1	1	1	2	4	2	2	453
3	(United States) Baggett	KTM	6	8	8	2	3	1	1	2	3	3	2	10	2	2	6	2	7	4	2	11	5	2	3	3	451
4	(United Kingdom) Wilson	Husqvarna	10	4	6	7	9	7	9	7	8	7	8	8	6	3	3	3	5	6	9	4	16	5	12	10	340
5	(United States) Seely	Honda	4	12	7	8	5	10	10	8	Ret	DNS	6	9	5	5	8	6	3	5	3	6	4	8	4	4	330
6	(United States) Bogle	Suzuki	8	10	12	5	1	9	7	9	12	5	9	7	9	13	16	Ret	8	10	4	10	1	3	11	9	308
7	(United States) Webb	Yamaha	5	9	10	Ret	22	4	6	5	9	9	Ret	DNS	3	6	4	9			7	3	9	7	6	5	268
8	(United States) Peick	Suzuki	12	11	9	6	12	13	8	Ret	4	4	14	4	Ret	8	12	11	6	8	6	20	8	6	7	8	268
9	(Ecuador) Davalos	Husqvarna	15	13	16	9	10	11	13	10	11	6	15	13	7	4	11	4	4	3	8	2	3	Ret			263
10	(United States) Anderson	Husqvarna	Ret	6	5	1	2	6	5	3	1	2	4	2	DNQ	DNQ	Ret	DNS									216
11	(United States) Craig	Honda	9	14	4	Ret			Ret	Ret			5	12	10	7	7	7	9	9	5	9	10	9	9	7	216
12	(Sweden) Noren	Honda	13	15	15	11	11	15	11	12	13	8	11	14	8	10	13	10	20	7	11	13	12	Ret	13	15	202
13	(United States) Barcia	Suzuki	11	5	13	10	6	12	DNS	DNS	5	10	7	6	12	12	5	8	DNS	DNS					10	13	191
14	(United States) Alix	KTM	17	16	19	15	13	14	15	13	14	14	16	Ret	17	11	15	12	12	12	13	12	13	13	17	18	152
15	(United States) B. Tickle	Suzuki	7	7	14	4	8	8	4	4	6	12	18	17													146
16	(United States) Grant	Kawasaki	3	3	3	Ret	Ret	5	3	11	DNS	DNS	10	5	11	Ret											143
17	(United States) Miller	Yamaha									Ret	13	12	16	13	9	9	14	13	13	14	14	18	Ret	16	12	108
18	(United States) Bisceglia	Suzuki															10	Ret	10	Ret	Ret	7	6	10	15	11	78
19	(United States) Bloss	KTM															14	24	17	11	15	8	11	11	8	28	73
20	(United States) J. Short	Yamaha							17	16	15	Ret	17	15	15	14	17	13	28	Ret	16	31	19	15	21	14	70
21	(United States) Harrison	Yamaha	20	18	21	13	15	16			17	17	Ret	DNS	16	30	18	29	18	Ret			15	16	19	23	55
22	(Netherlands) Herlings	KTM																							1	1	50
23	(United States) Mosiman	Husqvarna	24	20	24	16	16	31	20	20	16	15	21	23	19	18	19	16	29	18	18	15	22	21	25	19	50
24	(United States) Canard	KTM									10	11	13	11													39
25	(United States) Scharer	Yamaha	19	23	23	Ret	14	17	33	19	22	21	19	33	14	17	30	15	23	20	Ret	DNS	29	19	27	Ret	37
26	(United States) Nicoletti	Suzuki																			12	18	14	12	14	Ret	35
27	(United States) Hoeft	Yamaha			11	14													11	14							34
28	(Japan) Tomita	Honda			25	17	30	19	25	21	18	16	26	19	24	20	21	18	21	17	21	16	24	18	26	21	32
29	(Australia) Ferris	Yamaha							2	14																	29
30	(United States) R. Stewart	Suzuki	26	28	26	18	17	22	18	18	20	Ret	Ret	22	Ret	15	Ret	Ret	25	22	17	17	25	20	23	31	29
31	(United States) Chisholm	Honda																					20	14	18	16	16
32	(United States) Sipes	Husqvarna							14	15																	13
33	(United States) Merriam	Yamaha			30	Ret											Ret	20	14	16							13
34	(United States) Epstein	Kawasaki	Ret	22	18	12																					12
35	(United States) Weeck	Honda																	15	15							12
36	(New Zealand) Cooper	Honda	14	Ret	17	Ret																					11
37	(United States) Tedder	Kawasaki	29	26	Ret	20	24	24	Ret	17	Ret	18	31	18	Ret	31	Ret	21	34	21	Ret	25	Ret	22	32	25	11
38	(United States) Williams	Honda	23	29	32	Ret	18	18	22	22	24	23	23	24			22	17	35	24			26	31	24	22	10
39	(United States) LaMay	KTM																					17	23	20	17	9
40	(United States) Dowd	KTM													18	16							32	26			8
41	(United States) Teasdale	KTM					DNQ	DNQ	19	23	23	20	24	Ret	30	21	Ret	22					30	17	22	20	8
42	(United States) Bowers	Kawasaki																	16	19							7
43	(New Zealand) Carter	Kawasaki	18	17	22	Ret																					7
44	(Canada) Benoit	KTM	16	Ret																							5
45	(United States) Piazza	Honda							Ret	25	19	22	DNQ	DNQ							19	21	DNQ	DNQ			4
46	(United States) C. Tickle	Honda							21	24	Ret	19	33	25	Ret	DNS					20	Ret	DNQ	DNQ	Ret	Ret	3
47	(United States) Canning	KTM													20	19											3
48	(United States) Burger	Honda	21	27	Ret	23	19	20			34	24	27	28					30	Ret							3
49	(United States) Martin	Honda									26	Ret	28	Ret			23	19	Ret	Ret	25	30	21	34	28	26	2
50	(United States) Redman	Kawasaki							Ret	27	DNQ	DNQ	DNQ	DNQ			28	25			23	19			33	Ret	2
51	(Italy) Pellegrini	Suzuki	28	19	DNQ	DNQ																					2
52	(United States) Alldredge	KTM																	19	Ret							2
53	(United States) Je. Smith	Yamaha							DNQ	DNQ			20	21	Ret	26					30	DNS					1
54	(United States) Bell	Honda	27	21	20	Ret																					1
55	(United States) Wey	Kawasaki											22	20													1
56	(United States) Autenrieth	KTM															20	23									1
57	(United States) Baumert	KTM					20	23																			1
	(United States) Kouba	Kawasaki	25	24	29	22	Ret	21									DNQ	DNQ	27	29							0
	(United States) Pearson	KTM	22	25	Ret	21	DNQ	DNQ																			0
	(United States) Borrello	Yamaha													21	23											0
	(United States) Co. Olson	Yamaha					21	33			DNQ	DNQ											DNQ	DNQ			0
	(South Africa) Docherty	Kawasaki							DNQ	DNQ	21	Ret	DNQ	DNQ	Ret	Ret											0
	(United States) Hand	Honda							24	26			Ret	27	DNQ	DNQ	24	Ret	26	26	22	23	36	29			0
	(United States) Ray	Yamaha			28	25													22	28							0
	(United States) Kamm	KTM											25	26	22	27	26	Ret									0
	(United States) T. Lane	KTM													27	22							DNQ	DNQ			0
	(United States) Babbitt	KTM																			Ret	22					0
	(United States) Archer	Yamaha																					23	24			0
	(United States) Marshall	KTM													23	25											0
	(Zambia) Lionnet	Kawasaki					23	27					29	30	DNQ	DNQ											0
	(United States) DeMartile	Honda																	31	23							0
	(United States) Esper	Suzuki							23	33	Ret	31					Ret	Ret									0
	(United States) Runkles	Yamaha							32	Ret	30	25	DNQ	DNQ	DNQ	DNQ	DNQ	DNQ			24	24	33	27	35	29	0
	(United States) Grondahl	Honda											35	32	25	24					28	29	DNQ	DNQ	34	27	0
	(United States) Lesher	KTM							DNQ	DNQ			DNQ	DNQ			29	31			Ret	Ret	27	25	29	24	0
	(United States) Jurin	Kawasaki																	24	27							0
	(Brazil) Vilardi	Husqvarna	Ret	31	33	24																					0
	(United States) Gifford	Kawasaki			DNQ	DNQ	26	25																			0
	(United States) Tannenbaum	KTM							28	34	25	27															0
	(United States) Schmoke	KTM	Ret	Ret	27	Ret	25	32																			0
	(United States) Pauli	Kawasaki							34	32	DNQ	DNQ	DNQ	DNQ			25	27			DNQ	DNQ	DNQ	DNQ	31	35	0
	(United States) Leith	Kawasaki																	32	25							0
	(United States) Fratz-Orr	KTM							26	28	32	26	32	29	32	33	27	28	DNQ	DNQ	27	27	DNQ	DNQ	Ret	DNS	0
	(United States) Porter	Honda							DNQ	DNQ	28	29			26	Ret											0
	(United States) Perron	Kawasaki					31	28					DNQ	DNQ			31	26							38	30	0
	(United States) Lampi	Yamaha							31	31					Ret	Ret					32	26	31	30			0
	(United States) Mckenzie	Yamaha	30	Ret	34	26	DNQ	DNQ											DNQ	DNQ							0
	(United States) LaPorte	Yamaha					35	26	DNQ	DNQ	Ret	33	DNQ	DNQ											DNQ	DNQ	0
	(United States) Impens	Honda													DNQ	DNQ					26	Ret	DNQ	DNQ			0
	(United States) B. Stewart	Honda	Ret	32	35	27	34	35	Ret	DNS					DNQ	DNQ					29	32					0
	(United States) Lorenz III	Yamaha							27	Ret			34	31	DNQ	DNQ	Ret	DNS									0
	(United States) Akaydin	KTM									27	Ret					DNQ	DNQ					DNQ	DNQ	36	32	0
	(United States) Bannister	Honda					27	Ret	DNQ	DNQ																	0
	(United States) Phelps	Kawasaki													28	28											0
	(Bolivia) Antezana	Yamaha																					28	28			0
	(United States) Bitterman	Kawasaki									31	28															0
	(United States) Brough	Honda	33	34	DNQ	DNQ	28	34			DNQ	DNQ	DNQ	DNQ	DNQ	DNQ	DNQ	DNQ	DNQ	DNQ							0
	(United States) Coluzzi	KTM									DNQ	DNQ									Ret	28	35	33			0
	(United States) Roman	Suzuki							29	29																	0
	(United States) Catanzaro	Kawasaki													31	29											0
	(United States) Pipes	Suzuki							DNQ	DNQ	29	32	DNQ	DNQ			DNQ	DNQ	Ret	Ret	31	Ret					0
	(Uruguay) Rolando	Suzuki	32	Ret	DNQ	DNQ	29	37											Ret	DNS							0
	(United States) Johnson	Honda													29	32											0
	(United States) Thurman	Husqvarna					Ret	29																			0
	(United States) Lippman	Suzuki							30	30											DNQ	DNQ	34	36			0
	(United States) Harmon	Suzuki	DNQ	DNQ	Ret	Ret	Ret	30	DNQ	DNQ									DNQ	DNQ	DNQ	DNQ					0
	(United States) Raper	Kawasaki	31	30	31	Ret													DNQ	DNQ							0
	(United States) Peterson	Honda							DNQ	DNQ	33	30	DNQ	DNQ													0
	(United States) Wagner	Honda							Ret	Ret	DNQ	DNQ	DNQ	DNQ			DNQ	DNQ			DNQ	DNQ	37	35	30	33	0
	(United States) Walker	Honda							DNQ	DNQ			30	34			Ret	DNS									0
	(United States) Loberg	Husqvarna															Ret	30					DNQ	DNQ	37	34	0
	(United States) Gills	Honda																	36	30							0
	(United States) Cl. Olson	Honda					32	39																			0
	(United States) Stepek	Kawasaki																			DNQ	DNQ	Ret	32			0
	(Venezuela) Rodriguez	Honda																			33	Ret	DNS	DNS			0
	(United States) Nauditt	Honda																	33	Ret							0
	(United States) Brennan	Yamaha	Ret	33	DNQ	DNQ	36	36																			0
	(United States) France	Honda					33	38	DNQ	DNQ					DNQ	DNQ							DNQ	DNQ	DNQ	DNQ	0
	(United States) Higley	KTM							DNQ	DNQ			DNQ	DNQ	Ret	34					DNQ	DNQ					0
	(United States) Dietrich	Kawasaki																	Ret	DNS							0
	(United States) Robin	Honda																			Ret	DNS	Ret	Ret			0
	(United States) Bidus	Yamaha							DNQ	DNQ	DNQ	DNQ	Ret	DNS													0
	(United States) Freistat	Honda	Ret	DNS	DNQ	DNQ																					0
	(United States) Schmidt	Suzuki			Ret	DNS																					0
	(United States) Maley	Yamaha							DNQ	DNQ	DNQ	DNQ	DNQ	DNQ	DNQ	DNQ	DNQ	DNQ			DNQ	DNQ	DNQ	DNQ	DNQ	DNQ	0
	(United States) Rouse	Honda	DNQ	DNQ	DNQ	DNQ	DNQ	DNQ			DNQ	DNQ	DNQ	DNQ	DNQ	DNQ	DNQ	DNQ									0
	(United States) Gilliam	KTM							DNQ	DNQ	DNQ	DNQ	DNQ	DNQ	DNQ	DNQ					DNQ	DNQ	DNQ	DNQ	DNQ	DNQ	0
	(United States) Nagy	Suzuki			DNQ	DNQ	DNQ	DNQ	DNQ	DNQ			DNQ	DNQ			DNQ	DNQ			DNQ	DNQ					0
	(United States) Cooper	Yamaha							DNQ	DNQ	DNQ	DNQ	DNQ	DNQ	DNQ	DNQ					DNQ	DNQ			DNQ	DNQ	0
	(United States) Leininger	Honda							DNQ	DNQ	DNQ	DNQ	DNQ	DNQ							DNQ	DNQ	DNQ	DNQ	DNQ	DNQ	0
	(United States) Testa	Yamaha							DNQ	DNQ	DNQ	DNQ			DNQ	DNQ					DNQ	DNQ	DNQ	DNQ	DNQ	DNQ	0
	(United States) Gores	KTM			DNQ	DNQ	DNQ	DNQ	DNQ	DNQ			DNQ	DNQ					DNQ	DNQ							0
	(United States) Emory	Yamaha					DNQ	DNQ			DNQ	DNQ					DNQ	DNQ					DNQ	DNQ	DNQ	DNQ	0
	(United States) Nelko	KTM							DNQ	DNQ	DNQ	DNQ	DNQ	DNQ							DNQ	DNQ	DNQ	DNQ			0
	(United States) Maus	Yamaha											DNQ	DNQ	DNQ	DNQ	DNQ	DNQ					DNQ	DNQ	DNQ	DNQ	0
	(United States) Thomas	Yamaha	DNQ	DNQ	DNQ	DNQ	DNQ	DNQ											DNQ	DNQ							0
	(United States) Ja. Smith	Yamaha					DNQ	DNQ			DNQ	DNQ	DNQ	DNQ					DNQ	DNQ							0
	(United States) Jackson	Kawasaki					DNQ	DNQ					DNQ	DNQ			DNQ	DNQ							DNQ	DNQ	0
	(United States) Snow	Honda							DNQ	DNQ	DNQ	DNQ	DNQ	DNQ											DNQ	DNQ	0
	(United States) Kuchnicki	KTM							DNQ	DNQ					DNQ	DNQ	DNQ	DNQ							DNQ	DNQ	0
	(United States) Endriss	Yamaha							DNQ	DNQ					DNQ	DNQ					DNQ	DNQ	DNQ	DNQ			0
	(United States) J. McConnell	KTM							DNQ	DNQ			DNQ	DNQ							DNQ	DNQ	DNQ	DNQ			0
	(United States) Dreisbach	Yamaha							DNQ	DNQ					DNQ	DNQ					DNQ	DNQ	DNQ	DNQ			0
	(United States) Berry	Yamaha									DNQ	DNQ									DNQ	DNQ	DNQ	DNQ	DNQ	DNQ	0
	(United States) Robbins	Kawasaki											DNQ	DNQ	DNQ	DNQ					DNQ	DNQ	DNQ	DNQ			0
	(United States) Skodras	Honda											DNQ	DNQ			DNQ	DNQ					DNQ	DNQ	DNQ	DNQ	0
	(United States) Heckendorf	Suzuki											DNQ	DNQ			DNQ	DNQ					DNQ	DNQ	DNQ	DNQ	0
	(United States) Ray	Honda															DNQ	DNQ			DNQ	DNQ	DNQ	DNQ	DNQ	DNQ	0
	(United States) Foedish III	Husqvarna	DNQ	DNQ	DNQ	DNQ	DNQ	DNQ																			0
	(United States) Richards	Suzuki	DNQ	DNQ	DNQ	DNQ													DNQ	DNQ							0
	(Italy) Gobbi	Kawasaki	DNQ	DNQ	DNQ	DNQ													DNQ	DNQ							0
	(United States) Shondeck	KTM			DNQ	DNQ	DNQ	DNQ															DNQ	DNQ			0
	(United States) Lafalce	Yamaha			DNQ	DNQ	DNQ	DNQ															DNQ	DNQ			0
	(United States) F. Smith	Honda					DNQ	DNQ			DNQ	DNQ													DNQ	DNQ	0
	(United States) Bachman	Yamaha							DNQ	DNQ	DNQ	DNQ	DNQ	DNQ													0
	(United States) C. Short	Yamaha							DNQ	DNQ	DNQ	DNQ			DNQ	DNQ											0
	(United States) Coons	Kawasaki							DNQ	DNQ			DNQ	DNQ			DNQ	DNQ									0
	(United States) Grgurich	Yamaha							DNQ	DNQ			DNQ	DNQ			DNQ	DNQ									0
	(United States) Tate	KTM							DNQ	DNQ			DNQ	DNQ											DNQ	DNQ	0
	(United States) Narel	Suzuki							DNQ	DNQ					DNQ	DNQ	DNQ	DNQ									0
	(United States) Makuta	Honda							DNQ	DNQ					DNQ	DNQ					DNQ	DNQ					0
	(United States) Cagno	Yamaha							DNQ	DNQ					DNQ	DNQ					DNQ	DNQ					0
	(United States) T. Smith	Honda									DNQ	DNQ											DNQ	DNQ	DNQ	DNQ	0
	(United States) Hameister	Husqvarna											DNQ	DNQ			DNQ	DNQ							DNQ	DNQ	0
	(United States) Flintrop	Yamaha													DNQ	DNQ	DNQ	DNQ							DNQ	DNQ	0
	(United States) Sanchez	Honda													DNQ	DNQ					DNQ	DNQ	DNQ	DNQ			0
	(United States) Woodrow	Honda													DNQ	DNQ					DNQ	DNQ	DNQ	DNQ			0
	(United States) White	Honda													DNQ	DNQ					DNQ	DNQ	DNQ	DNQ			0
	(United States) Cicero	Yamaha	DNQ	DNQ	DNQ	DNQ																					0
	(United States) McCool	Yamaha	DNQ	DNQ	DNQ	DNQ																					0
	(United States) Peddie	Husqvarna	DNQ	DNQ	DNQ	DNQ																					0
	(United States) B. Thompson	Honda			DNQ	DNQ													DNQ	DNQ							0
	(United States) Citrola	Honda					DNQ	DNQ									DNQ	DNQ									0
	(United States) Philbrick	Honda					DNQ	DNQ									DNQ	DNQ									0
	(United States) Fortner	Yamaha					DNQ	DNQ									DNQ	DNQ									0
	(United States) Humiston	Honda					DNQ	DNQ											DNQ	DNQ							0
	(United States) Dillon	KTM					DNQ	DNQ											DNQ	DNQ							0
	(United States) Reynolds	Yamaha					DNQ	DNQ											DNQ	DNQ							0
	(United States) J. Thompson	Yamaha							DNQ	DNQ	DNQ	DNQ															0
	(United States) Ashburn	KTM							DNQ	DNQ	DNQ	DNQ															0
	(United States) Scouten	KTM							DNQ	DNQ			DNQ	DNQ													0
	(United States) West	Honda							DNQ	DNQ							DNQ	DNQ									0
	(United States) Greenawalt	Kawasaki							DNQ	DNQ															DNQ	DNQ	0
	(United States) Durivage	Honda									DNQ	DNQ	DNQ	DNQ													0
	(United States) Titus	Husqvarna									DNQ	DNQ			DNQ	DNQ											0
	(United States) Barr	Suzuki											DNQ	DNQ	DNQ	DNQ											0
	(United States) Prior	Yamaha											DNQ	DNQ	DNQ	DNQ											0
	(United States) R. Peters	Yamaha											DNQ	DNQ			DNQ	DNQ									0
	(United States) Mays	Kawasaki											DNQ	DNQ			DNQ	DNQ									0
	(United States) Slark	Honda											DNQ	DNQ			DNQ	DNQ									0
	(United States) L. Peters	Yamaha											DNQ	DNQ			DNQ	DNQ									0
	(United States) Weaver	Yamaha											DNQ	DNQ											DNQ	DNQ	0
	(United States) Brill	Honda											DNQ	DNQ											DNQ	DNQ	0
	(United States) Schroyer	KTM											DNQ	DNQ											DNQ	DNQ	0
	(United States) Hammer	KTM													DNQ	DNQ					DNQ	DNQ					0
	(United States) Kraeger	Honda													DNQ	DNQ					DNQ	DNQ					0
	(United States) MacDonald	Honda													DNQ	DNQ					DNQ	DNQ					0
	(United States) Coen	Honda													DNQ	DNQ					DNQ	DNQ					0
	(United States) Costa	KTM													DNQ	DNQ					DNQ	DNQ					0
	(United States) Uebrick	Yamaha													DNQ	DNQ					DNQ	DNQ					0
	(United States) Boron	KTM													DNQ	DNQ					DNQ	DNQ					0
	(United States) C. Williams	Yamaha													DNQ	DNQ							DNQ	DNQ			0
	(United States) Ashe	Husqvarna													DNQ	DNQ							DNQ	DNQ			0
	(United States) Myers	Yamaha															DNQ	DNQ							DNQ	DNQ	0
	(United States) Kohnke	Honda															DNQ	DNQ							DNQ	DNQ	0
	(United States) Karl	Honda															DNQ	DNQ							DNQ	DNQ	0
	(United States) Prier	Honda															DNQ	DNQ							DNQ	DNQ	0
	(United States) Grove	Yamaha																			DNQ	DNQ	DNQ	DNQ			0
	(United States) McKay	Yamaha																			DNQ	DNQ	DNQ	DNQ			0
	(United States) Giambrone	Suzuki																			DNQ	DNQ	DNQ	DNQ			0
	(United States) Politelli	Yamaha	DNQ	DNQ																							0
	(United States) Buller	Suzuki			DNQ	DNQ																					0
	(United States) Muscutt	Suzuki			DNQ	DNQ																					0
	(United States) DeSimone	Honda			DNQ	DNQ																					0
	(South Korea) Lee	Yamaha			DNQ	DNQ																					0
	(United States) DePrenger	Honda					DNQ	DNQ																			0
	(United States) Player	KTM					DNQ	DNQ																			0
	(United States) Stolz	Honda					DNQ	DNQ																			0
	(United States) Briner	Husqvarna					DNQ	DNQ																			0
	(United States) Brewster	Honda					DNQ	DNQ																			0
	(United States) Stevenson	Honda					DNQ	DNQ																			0
	(United States) Sabbaugh	Yamaha					DNQ	DNQ																			0
	(United States) Brown	Yamaha							DNQ	DNQ																	0
	(United States) DeNeen	Honda							DNQ	DNQ																	0
	(United States) Lechien	Yamaha							DNQ	DNQ																	0
	(United States) R. McConnell	KTM									DNQ	DNQ															0
	(United States) Schudel	KTM									DNQ	DNQ															0
	(United States) Wagers	Yamaha									DNQ	DNQ															0
	(United States) Zitterkopf	Yamaha									DNQ	DNQ															0
	(United States) Rose	Kawasaki									DNQ	DNQ															0
	(United States) Au. Morrison	Yamaha									DNQ	DNQ															0
	(United States) Finley	Honda											DNQ	DNQ													0
	(United States) Montreuil	KTM											DNQ	DNQ													0
	(United States) Weisenberger	Husqvarna											DNQ	DNQ													0
	(United States) Al. Morrison	Honda											DNQ	DNQ													0
	(United States) Rivard	Yamaha											DNQ	DNQ													0
	(United States) Siler	Yamaha											DNQ	DNQ													0
	(United States) Sheridan	Honda													DNQ	DNQ											0
	(United States) Desjardins	KTM													DNQ	DNQ											0
	(United States) Czarnota	KTM													DNQ	DNQ											0
	(United States) Tolman-Moschetti	Suzuki													DNQ	DNQ											0
	(United States) Schock	Honda													DNQ	DNQ											0
	(United States) Kelleher	Honda													DNQ	DNQ											0
	(United States) Price	Suzuki													DNQ	DNQ											0
	(United States) Buffis	Honda													DNQ	DNQ											0
	(United States) Lykens	KTM													DNQ	DNQ											0
	(United States) Schnagl	Honda															DNQ	DNQ									0
	(United States) Koosmann	Yamaha															DNQ	DNQ									0
	(United States) Wood	Honda															DNQ	DNQ									0
	(United States) Barnowski	Husqvarna																	DNQ	DNQ							0
	(United States) McBride	KTM																	DNQ	DNQ							0
	(Sweden) Ovgard	Yamaha																	DNQ	DNQ							0
	(United States) James	Honda																	DNQ	DNQ							0
	(United States) Knight	KTM																	DNQ	DNQ							0
	(United States) Rathjen	Suzuki																	DNQ	DNQ							0
	(United States) Astudillo	Honda																			DNQ	DNQ					0
	(United States) Sigismondi	Kawasaki																			DNQ	DNQ					0
	(United States) Roth	Yamaha																			DNQ	DNQ					0
	(United States) Addy	Yamaha																			DNQ	DNQ					0
	(United States) Ovitt	KTM																			DNQ	DNQ					0
	(United States) Hopkins	Honda																			DNQ	DNQ					0
	(Ecuador) Benenaula	Kawasaki																					DNQ	DNQ			0
	(United States) Hougentogler	Honda																					DNQ	DNQ			0
	(United States) Ferrell	Suzuki																					DNQ	DNQ			0
	(United States) Bright	Honda																					DNQ	DNQ			0
	(United States) N. Lane	Suzuki																					DNQ	DNQ			0
	(United States) VanBeek	Suzuki																					DNQ	DNQ			0
	(United States) Netti	Yamaha																					DNQ	DNQ			0
	(United States) Camp	KTM																							DNQ	DNQ	0
	(United States) Frassetto	Suzuki																							DNQ	DNQ	0
	(United States) Craven	Honda																							DNQ	DNQ	0
Pos	Rider	Bike	HAN (California)		GLN (California)		THU (Colorado)		HIG (Pennsylvania)		TEN (Tennessee)		RED (Michigan)		SOU (Massachusetts)		SPR (Minnesota)		WAS (Washington (state))		UNA (New York (state))		BUD (Maryland)		IRN (Indiana)		Points

== 250 Class ==
=== Entry list ===
Team	Constructor	No	Rider	Rounds
GEICO Honda	Honda	6	(United States) Jeremy Martin	All
GEICO Honda	Honda	31	(United States) RJ Hampshire	4–12
GEICO Honda	Honda	57	(United States) James Decotis	1–3
GEICO Honda	Honda	128	(United States) Cameron McAdoo	1–4, 6
GEICO Honda	Honda	486	(United States) Chase Sexton	4–12
Rockstar Energy Husqvarna	Husqvarna	16	(United States) Zach Osborne	All
Rockstar Energy Husqvarna	Husqvarna	342	(United States) Michael Mosiman	1–4
Monster Energy Kawasaki	Kawasaki	17	(United States) Joey Savatgy	1–11
Monster Energy Kawasaki	Kawasaki	24	(United States) Austin Forkner	1–7
Monster Energy Kawasaki	Kawasaki	36	(United States) Adam Cianciarulo	All
Monster Energy Kawasaki	Kawasaki	46	(United States) Justin Hill	1–9, 12
Star Racing Yamaha	Yamaha	23	(United States) Aaron Plessinger	All
Star Racing Yamaha	Yamaha	39	(United States) Colt Nichols	All
Star Racing Yamaha	Yamaha	45	(United States) Mitchell Harrison	All
Star Racing Yamaha	Yamaha	108	(France) Dylan Ferrandis	1–11
Star Racing Yamaha	Yamaha	191	(United States) Justin Cooper	10–12
TLD Red Bull KTM	KTM	26	(United States) Alex Martin	1–8
TLD Red Bull KTM	KTM	28	(United States) Mitchell Oldenburg	1–2
TLD Red Bull KTM	KTM	38	(United States) Shane McElrath	1–11
TLD Red Bull KTM	KTM	44	(United States) Jordon Smith	4
TLD Red Bull KTM	KTM	129	(United States) Sean Cantrell	All
Autotrader JGR Suzuki	Suzuki	42	(United States) Kyle Cunningham	All
Traders Racing	Yamaha	50	(United States) Luke Renzland	All
Traders Racing	Yamaha	78	(United States) Nick Gaines	All
Traders Racing	Yamaha	231	(United States) Jayce Pennington	10–12
Cycle Trader Rock River Yamaha	Yamaha	74	(United States) Bradley Taft	2–12
Cycle Trader Rock River Yamaha	Yamaha	183	(Venezuela) Lorenzo Locurcio	All
Cycle Trader Rock River Yamaha	Yamaha	702	(United States) Josiah Hempen	1–10
Triggr Racing	Yamaha	81	(United States) Henry Miller	3–4
JMC Motorsports	Husqvarna	87	(United States) Chris Howell	9
JMC Motorsports	KTM	354	(United States) Ben Evans	9
Honda of Houston	Honda	96	(United States) Vann Martin	1–4, 7
Adventure Moto KTM	KTM	105	(United Kingdom) Steven Clarke	4–5, 7–8, 10–12
EVS Sports	Kawasaki	130	(United States) Austin Root	5–12
TRD	Yamaha	148	(United States) Connar Troyer	4, 6, 10–12
	Yamaha	164	(United States) Matthew Klann	4, 6, 12
FXR 6D Helmets	Yamaha	172	(United States) Mark Worth	2–3, 5, 9
Von Zipper Yamaha	Yamaha	179	(United States) Jon Ames	1–2, 5–6, 8–12
TISCO Racing	KTM	184	(United States) Michael Thacker	3
Monks Construction Racing	KTM	186	(United States) Tyler Monks	12
	KTM	187	(United States) Walter White	7, 10–11
	Honda	199	(United States) Ethan Williams	7
Thomsen Racing	Yamaha	200	(Denmark) Joachim Falden	1–4, 6–7, 10–11
Hempen Racing	Yamaha	202	(United States) Luke Hempen	6, 8–10, 12
GJ Star Racing	Yamaha	209	(United States) William Lofstrom	4–5, 7, 10
Adventure Powersports	Kawasaki	220	(United States) Travis Hardcastle	12
	KTM	221	(United States) Ronnie Demorest	4, 11
GDR Honda	Honda	223	(Canada) Dylan Wright	11–12
	KTM	228	(United States) Donny Brown	5
Fly Racing Honda	Honda	234	(United States) McCoy Brough	1–3, 5–9
Tucker Cantrell Racing	Yamaha	235	(United States) Tucker Cantrell	1–3, 5, 8
Freedom Cycle Suzuki	Suzuki	238	(United States) Benjamin Robinson	7, 10
	KTM	246	(United States) Chance Blackburn	8–12
Tom Zont Racing	Kawasaki	249	(United States) Dale Kathan	12
454 Factory	Yamaha	264	(United States) Tyler Kirschner	4–7, 10–11
	KTM	268	(United States) Blake Neiehiser	3–4
World of Powersports	Kawasaki	288	(United States) Parker Smith	4–6, 8, 12
Mason Agency	Kawasaki	294	(United States) Nicholas McDonnell	4, 7, 10–11
Snyder Racing	KTM	299	(United States) Tucker Snyder	5
Haeseker Racing Engines	Yamaha	310	(United States) Tyler Krisman	9
	Honda	319	(United States) Cody Schock	4, 6, 10–11
	Kawasaki	321	(Zambia) Bradley Lionnet	1–2, 8–9
Team Chiz	Kawasaki	325	(United States) Cody Chisholm	11–12
Hand Racing	Honda	332	(United States) Jeremy Hand	12
Braden Racing	Kawasaki	336	(United States) Chaz Braden	3, 6, 8
3D Racing Yamaha	Yamaha	341	(United States) Nico Izzi	1–4
Custom MX Supply	Yamaha	345	(United States) Joshua Prior	10–12
Beck and Boys Racing	KTM	350	(United States) Roland Beck Jr.	10
Babbit's Kawasaki	Kawasaki	355	(United States) Joey Crown	10–12
Dialed Racing	Yamaha	361	(United States) Gregory Hutchinson	7
	KTM	367	(United States) Hunter Sayles	6–8, 10, 12
	KTM	369	(United States) Jason Astudillo	11
	Yamaha	370	(United States) Chandler Lindsay	5
	Kawasaki	388	(United States) Brandan Leith	1–3
	Husqvarna	393	(United States) Curren Thurman	6
Frank Craven Racing Team	Yamaha	400	(United States) Nick Peterson	8, 10–12
TMV Motorsports	KTM	417	(United States) Conner Monks	2–3
	Suzuki	419	(United States) William Kwiecinski	4–12
Kessler Pro Suspension	Honda	420	(United States) Christopher Duymich	7
Kessler Pro Suspension	Honda	449	(United States) Dakota Kessler	6–8, 10–12
DTA Racing	KTM	421	(United States) Jesse Kirchmeyer	10–12
RoadRunner Transportation Services	Husqvarna	422	(Germany) Philipp Klakow	9
Xtreme Powersports	Honda	425	(United States) Joshua Leininger	4–6, 10–12
Pardini Paving	Yamaha	426	(United States) Matthew Fisk	10–12
	Yamaha	427	(United States) Deegan Vonlossberg	1–2, 9
Schaeffer Oil Racing	Husqvarna	430	(United States) Dylan Summerlin	9
Bunch Racing	Yamaha	436	(United States) Jason Bunch	6, 9
TPJ Racing	Honda	446	(United States) Blaine Silveira	4–6, 8–10, 12
Belleville Honda	Honda	452	(United States) Trey Launius	4, 6, 12
Illinois Powersports	Honda	464	(United States) Branden Brill	6, 8, 12
TJ's Cycles	KTM	470	(United States) Kyle Hopkins	3–9
FCC Motorsports	Honda	481	(United States) Johnathan Wells	4, 10–11
Redemption Racing	KTM	487	(United States) Josh Osby	6
Lyon Racing	Honda	488	(United States) Jake Lyon	6, 9
Nagy Racing	Suzuki	509	(United States) Alexander Nagy	9, 12
	Honda	510	(United States) Travis Prier	6
Giles Racing	Honda	511	(United States) Charles Wernig	10–11
Roth Racing	Yamaha	514	(United States) Anthony Roth	11
Zitterkopf Racing	Yamaha	522	(United States) Cole Zitterkopf	1–4, 6–8
RPMA FXR Race Team	Honda	529	(United States) Broc Loftus	1
Blue Buffalo Yamaha	Yamaha	558	(United States) Jerry Robin	1–4, 7–8
Blue Buffalo Yamaha	Yamaha	622	(United States) Zac Maley	9
	Yamaha	561	(United States) Caleb Hall	10–12
Woodstock KTM	KTM	570	(United States) Cody VanBuskirk	3–4, 6–8, 12
Atkinson Racing	Yamaha	582	(United States) Britton Atkinson	4–6, 11
RS Racing	Husqvarna	583	(United States) Corey Ridel	4, 7, 10–12
Rob's Performance Motorsports	KTM	598	(United States) Mason Persha	12
Bubbas Motorsports Racing	Honda	603	(United States) Patrick Delowery	7, 11
609 Compound	Honda	609	(United States) Bradley DePrenger	6, 8, 10–11
CrankyApe.com	Honda	613	(United States) Nick Schnagl	4–6
Privogy LLC	Honda	616	(United States) Chase Ray	4–7
J&J Mechanical	Yamaha	617	(United States) Joshua Liston	4
Modern RV	Honda	631	(United States) Brandon Dickson	4, 6–8, 12
Larsons Cycle KTM	KTM	633	(United States) Trevor Lind	3, 6, 8–9, 12
Blessing Racing	Suzuki	634	(United States) Adam Blessing	7
	Honda	640	(United States) Aaron Zielfelder	4–12
Microbilt	Suzuki	645	(United States) Cheyenne Harmon	11–12
Team Carey	Kawasaki	646	(United States) Nicholas Hancher	6
Team Carey	Kawasaki	786	(United States) Sean Miller	6
Rocket Valley Powersports	KTM	647	(United States) Ryan Lechien	6, 10–11
SC Precision	KTM	649	(United States) Corey Burnett	7, 10
Compression Generation Services	Honda	655	(Canada) John Pauk	3, 5
Sportland 2 Powersports	Kawasaki	657	(United States) Justin Wolf	3, 6, 8, 11–12
Sportland 2 Powersports	Suzuki	936	(United States) Joshua Philbrick	11–12
Roost MX	Yamaha	660	(United States) Stone Edler	1–6
The Dirt Shop	Husqvarna	671	(United States) Mason Marty	11–12
Black Diamond MX	Yamaha	674	(United States) Riley Kroone	8
Raw MX	Kawasaki	675	(United States) Kyle Dillin	10
Latitude Graphics Racing	Yamaha	677	(United States) Cody Williams	1–4, 6–12
Robs Performance Motorsport	KTM	678	(United States) Taylor Strauss	8, 12
	Yamaha	700	(United States) Jimmy Weeks	4–8, 10–12
Alliance Steel	Husqvarna	715	(United States) Kele Russell	9
PR2 Suspension	Yamaha	716	(United States) Timothy Crosby	4–5, 8, 11–12
Mikeys Motorsports	Honda	719	(United States) Joshua Berchem	6–7, 10–11
Fratz-Orr Racing	KTM	720	(United States) Derek Fratz-Orr	12
Motorsport Hillsboro	Husqvarna	726	(United States) Gared Steinke	9–10
Hillview Motorsports	Suzuki	731	(United States) Steve Roman	10–12
Stevenson Racing	Honda	746	(United States) Chase Stevenson	5–6, 8–9
Tri City Cycle	Yamaha	747	(United States) Cody Gray	3, 8
Motorsport Hillsboro	Kawasaki	767	(United States) Mason Wharton	1–5
Cycles R Us	Yamaha	769	(United States) Michael Norris	3–4
Freedom 35	Yamaha	775	(United States) Jared Trepanier	9
Suire Racing	KTM	790	(United States) Mitchel Suire	4–5
Itamarca Racing	Honda	791	(Brazil) Gustavo Souza	1–2, 5–8, 10–12
Stansbury Tree Service	Yamaha	818	(United States) Jimmy Barry	4–5, 7
Oxborrow Racing	Honda	820	(United States) Dalton Oxborrow	1, 3
	KTM	827	(United States) Blake Ovitt	4, 6–7, 11–12
NPR 4 Autism	Honda	832	(United States) Brady Neys	6, 8, 12
	KTM	842	(United States) Jake Scott	4–5, 7, 10–12
	Yamaha	847	(United States) DJ Christie	4–6, 8, 10, 12
MB60 Action Sports	Kawasaki	870	(United States) Colton Camp	10
Roseville Yamaha	Yamaha	892	(United States) Garret Ioppolo	1–3, 9–10
Magic Racing	Yamaha	904	(United States) Jarrett Pesci	6, 12
Five Star Powersports	Suzuki	915	(United States) Garrett Smith	4, 11
Championship Powersports Racing	KTM	924	(United States) Greg Durivage	12
Bell Racing	Honda	929	(United States) Travis Bell	1–2
Pasha Racing	Yamaha	934	(United States) Brian Medeiros	9
Netti Racing	Yamaha	947	(United States) Daniel Netti	6–7, 10
Munn Racing	Husqvarna	959	(United States) Josef DeBower	8
Kawasaki Brazil	Kawasaki	970	(Brazil) Pedro Bueno	6–7
BJZ Cycle Shop	KTM	971	(United States) Benjamin Brouillard	10–11
Super America Superstores	Husqvarna	975	(United States) Jake Loberg	6
Team JKopMX	Honda	986	(United States) Lane Shaw	12
Championship Powersports Wauseon	KTM	995	(United States) Chris Prebula	8, 10–12

=== Riders Championship ===
Pos	Rider	Bike	HAN (California)		GLN (California)		THU (Colorado)		HIG (Pennsylvania)		TEN (Tennessee)		RED (Michigan)		SOU (Massachusetts)		SPR (Minnesota)		WAS (Washington (state))		UNA (New York (state))		BUD (Maryland)		IRN (Indiana)		Points
1	(United States) Osborne	Husqvarna	1	1	4	2	8	5	1	2	5	1	2	1	2	1	8	1	4	3	3	5	8	1	1	1	501
2	(United States) J. Martin	Honda	Ret	3	1	7	3	2	2	1	13	6	1	8	4	6	4	5	9	6	2	1	2	6	8	3	420
3	(United States) Cianciarulo	Kawasaki	2	8	7	3	5	Ret	5	13	2	5	8	13	15	9	6	6	2	5	5	8	1	2	2	2	374
4	(United States) Plessinger	Yamaha	3	5	3	13	7	Ret	3	3	1	2	6	11	Ret	DNS	3	12	1	9	4	10	5	4	4	Ret	337
5	(United States) Savatgy	Kawasaki	7	7	2	Ret	4	1	8	7	11	7	11	10	7	5	1	2	7	1	1	4	DNS	DNS			324
6	(France) Ferrandis	Yamaha	Ret	DNS	9	1	9	6	4	4	9	15	5	4	1	2	7	8	3	4	6	3	15	Ret			305
7	(United States) Nichols	Yamaha	5	6	5	4	6	12	12	30	8	8	10	12	8	10	9	13	10	7	11	9	7	5	3	4	303
8	(United States) A. Martin	KTM	4	4	6	5	1	4	7	5	4	4	3	3	3	3	2	4									296
9	(United States) Harrison	Yamaha	9	11	13	8	11	8	10	9	10	10	7	2	6	7	11	17	5	15	9	16	11	10	5	8	279
10	(United States) McElrath	KTM	16	10	12	9	10	9	11	14	6	11	9	9	11	13	16	3	11	8	10	14	4	3			248
11	(United States) Hampshire	Honda							9	8	Ret	12	Ret	DNS	5	4	5	7	6	2	8	6	3	7	12	5	222
12	(United States) Sexton	Honda							19	10	15	9	12	7	9	8	12	11	13	12	7	12	9	9	10	6	188
13	(United States) Forkner	Kawasaki	11	2	Ret	6	2	3	6	6	3	3	4	14	Ret	DNS											184
14	(United States) S. Cantrell	KTM	10	13	10	11	15	11	14	15	7	Ret	16	21	14	17	14	14	8	16	14	Ret	10	18	6	12	176
15	(United States) Cunningham	Suzuki	Ret	Ret	Ret	Ret	13	13	13	16	16	17	14	16	18	11	15	Ret	Ret	11	13	7	6	12	9	14	144
16	(United States) Renzland	Yamaha	14	20	16	Ret	21	20	15	12	12	14	20	6	10	14	18	15	12	10	19	21	12	11	15	15	141
17	(United States) Gaines	Yamaha	13	15	15	15	19	16	16	18	Ret	18	13	18	16	15	17	10	15	13	16	22	Ret	16	13	10	124
18	(Venezuela) Locurcio	Yamaha	18	17	17	14	20	18	18	11	18	16	24	15	12	12	13	18	16	19	17	18	17	15	14	11	119
19	(United States) Hill	Kawasaki	8	9	Ret	12	17	7	Ret	17	17	13	17	5	Ret	DNS	DNS	DNS	DNS	DNS					11	9	110
20	(United States) Taft	Yamaha			14	17	18	15	Ret	19	32	19	19	20	20	Ret	Ret	9	14	14	15	13	Ret	Ret	7	13	90
21	(United States) Cooper	Yamaha																			12	2	14	8	16	7	70
22	(United States) Mosiman	Husqvarna	12	14	8	10	12	10	17	Ret																	64
23	(United Kingdom) Clarke	KTM							20	Ret	14	20			13	Ret	10	Ret			Ret	11	20	14	17	Ret	50
24	(United States) Oldenburg	KTM	6	12	Ret	DNS																					24
25	(United States) Decotis	Honda	20	Ret	11	Ret	16	14																			23
26	(Brazil) Souza	Honda	Ret	18	20	16					23	22	22	19	19	Ret	20	Ret			DNQ	DNQ	Ret	17	25	16	23
27	(United States) Williams	Yamaha	19	22	22	22	27	21	26	21			21	23	17	19	19	19	18	Ret	23	20	16	26	19	Ret	23
28	(Canada) Wright	Honda																					13	13	20	18	20
29	(United States) Worth	Yamaha			18	18	14	19			19	Ret							Ret	DNS							17
30	(United States) Crown	Kawasaki																			18	15	18	19	21	19	16
31	(United States) Robin	Yamaha	17	Ret	19	19	25	17	21	Ret					32	32	Ret	Ret									12
32	(United States) McAdoo	Honda	15	16	Ret	Ret			DNQ	DNQ			Ret	DNS													11
33	(United States) Ames	Yamaha	33	Ret	Ret	DNS					20	21	23	25			25	16	Ret	DNS	20	25	22	22	36	17	11
34	(United States) Root	Kawasaki									24	Ret	30	26	24	27	Ret	26	17	17	22	19	21	20	23	23	11
35	(United States) Osby	KTM											15	17													10
36	(United States) Pennington	Yamaha																			21	17	19	21	18	22	9
37	(United States) Lofstrom	Honda							28	29	22	Ret			21	16					26	Ret					5
38	(United States) Sayles	KTM											18	28	26	Ret	23	20			Ret	DNS			Ret	Ret	4
39	(United States) VanBuskirk	KTM					26	30	29	27			25	22	22	18	21	23							24	20	4
40	(United States) Summerlin	Husqvarna																	20	18							4
41	(United States) J. Hempen	Yamaha	23	25	24	Ret	22	28	DNQ	DNQ	Ret	23	27	Ret	23	20	22	21	19	22	DNS	DNS					3
42	(United States) Leith	Kawasaki	22	19	Ret	DNS	24	22																			2
43	(Zambia) Lionnet	Kawasaki	21	21	21	20											33	22	24	25							1
44	(United States) Howell	Husqvarna																	23	20							1
45	(United States) Miller	Yamaha					Ret	Ret	Ret	20																	1
	(United States) Edler	Yamaha	27	23	26	21	23	23	23	22	DNS	DNS	26	Ret													0
	(United States) Crosby	Yamaha							22	26	21	25					27	29					30	28	30	31	0
	(United States) Evans	KTM																	22	21							0
	(United States) Hand	Honda																							22	21	0
	(United States) V. Martin	Honda	24	27	27	27	28	25	27	25					25	21											0
	(United States) Vonlossberg	Yamaha	26	30	29	26													21	26							0
	(United States) Zielfelder	Honda							30	Ret	28	28	DNQ	DNQ	34	22	24	25	29	23	29	29	23	24	DNQ	DNQ	0
	(United States) Izzi	Yamaha	25	28	23	24	Ret	Ret	24	23																	0
	(United States) Schock	Honda							31	24			Ret	Ret							24	24	24	23			0
	(United States) Brough	Honda	Ret	24	28	23	31	26			25	27	34	31	DNQ	DNQ	31	24	26	27							0
	(United States) Weeks	Yamaha							DNQ	DNQ	33	29	DNQ	DNQ	29	23	DNQ	DNQ			DNQ	DNQ	31	33	34	24	0
	(United States) Kessler	Honda											33	Ret	Ret	26	26	27			25	23	Ret	25	Ret	25	0
	(Brazil) Bueno	Kawasaki											29	24	27	24											0
	(United States) Neiehiser	KTM					Ret	24	25	Ret																	0
	(United States) Russell	Husqvarna																	25	24							0
	(United States) Lindsay	Yamaha									27	34															0
	(United States) Wharton	Kawasaki	29	26	30	25	33	31	Ret	31	37	Ret															0
	(Denmark) Falden	Yamaha	28	Ret	25	Ret	29	27	DNS	DNS			Ret	Ret	31	31					Ret	DNS	28	27			0
	(United States) Kirschner	Yamaha							DNQ	DNQ	29	32	32	32	30	28					30	Ret	25	30			0
	(United States) White	KTM													Ret	25					DNQ	DNQ	DNQ	DNQ			0
	(United States) Brown	KTM									26	26															0
	(United States) Prior	Yamaha																			31	26	27	32	DNQ	DNQ	0
	(United States) Chisholm	Kawasaki																					26	29	29	27	0
	(United States) Pesci	Yamaha											28	27											26	28	0
	(United States) Harmon	Suzuki																					33	31	28	26	0
	(United States) Steinke	Husqvarna																	Ret	DNS	27	27					0
	(United States) Blackburn	KTM															34	34	27	30	34	32	29	35	DNQ	DNQ	0
	(United States) Shaw	Honda																							27	Ret	0
	(United States) L. Hempen	Yamaha											DNQ	DNQ			28	28	Ret	DNS	36	30			32	33	0
	(United States) Silveira	Honda							Ret	33	DNQ	DNQ	DNQ	DNQ			Ret	31	Ret	28	28	31					0
	(United States) Scott	KTM							DNQ	DNQ	30	31			28	29					DNQ	DNQ	DNQ	DNQ	DNQ	DNQ	0
	(United States) Nagy	Suzuki																	28	29					37	32	0
	(United States) DePrenger	Honda											DNQ	DNQ			30	32			33	28	DNQ	DNQ			0
	(United States) Zitterkopf	Yamaha	31	33	32	28	DNQ	DNQ	DNQ	DNQ			DNQ	DNQ	DNQ	DNQ	DNQ	DNQ									0
	(United States) Wells	Honda							Ret	28											DNQ	DNQ	DNQ	DNQ			0
	(United States) Wolf	Kawasaki					32	32					35	33			29	30					32	37	35	35	0
	(United States) Gray	KTM					30	29									32	33									0
	(United States) Durivage	KTM																							31	29	0
	(United States) Bell	Honda	Ret	29	Ret	DNS																					0
	(United States) Thurman	Husqvarna											Ret	29													0
	(United States) Schnagl	Honda							32	32	31	30	31	30													0
	(United States) Ioppolo	Yamaha	32	32	31	Ret	35	34											30	32	35	Ret					0
	(United States) Loftus	Honda	30	31																							0
	(United States) McDonnell	Kawasaki							DNQ	DNQ					33	30					DNQ	DNQ	36	Ret			0
	(United States) Kirchmeyer	KTM																			DNQ	DNQ	DNQ	DNQ	33	30	0
	(United States) Trepanier	Yamaha																	31	33							0
	(United States) Medeiros	Yamaha																	Ret	31							0
	(United States) Roman	Suzuki																			32	Ret	35	34	38	34	0
	(United States) Krisman	Yamaha																	32	34							0
	(United States) Norris	Yamaha					34	33	Ret	34																	0
	(United States) Stevenson	Honda									36	33	DNQ	DNQ			DNQ	DNQ									0
	(United States) Atkinson	Yamaha							33	Ret	DNQ	DNQ	DNQ	DNQ									DNQ	DNQ			0
	(United States) Barry	Yamaha							DNQ	DNQ	34	34			DNQ	DNQ											0
	(United States) Oxborrow	Kawasaki	Ret	34			Ret	36																			0
	(United States) Astudillo	KTM																					34	36			0
	(United States) Kroone	Yamaha															35	35									0
	(United States) Suire	KTM							DNQ	DNQ	35	35															0
	(United States) Ridel	Husqvarna							DNQ	DNQ					35	Ret					DNQ	DNQ	DNQ	DNQ	DNQ	DNQ	0
	(United States) Braden	Kawasaki					36	35					DNQ	DNQ			Ret	Ret									0
	(United States) T. Cantrell	Yamaha	Ret	Ret	DNQ	DNQ	DNQ	DNQ			DNQ	DNQ					DNQ	DNQ									0
	(United States) Beck Jr	KTM																			Ret	DNS					0
	(United States) Hopkins	KTM					DNQ	DNQ	DNQ	DNQ	DNQ	DNQ	DNQ	DNQ	DNQ	DNQ	DNQ	DNQ	Ret	DNS							0
	(United States) J. Smith	KTM							DNS	DNS																	0
	(United States) Kwiecinski	Suzuki							DNQ	DNQ	DNQ	DNQ	DNQ	DNQ	DNQ	DNQ	DNQ	DNQ	DNQ	DNQ	DNQ	DNQ	DNQ	DNQ	DNQ	DNQ	0
	(United States) Christie	Yamaha							DNQ	DNQ	DNQ	DNQ	DNQ	DNQ			DNQ	DNQ			DNQ	DNQ			DNQ	DNQ	0
	(United States) Leininger	Honda							DNQ	DNQ	DNQ	DNQ	DNQ	DNQ							DNQ	DNQ	DNQ	DNQ	DNQ	DNQ	0
	(United States) Lind	KTM					DNQ	DNQ					DNQ	DNQ			DNQ	DNQ	DNQ	DNQ					DNQ	DNQ	0
	(United States) P. Smith	Kawasaki							DNQ	DNQ	DNQ	DNQ	DNQ	DNQ			DNQ	DNQ							DNQ	DNQ	0
	(United States) Dickson	Honda							DNQ	DNQ			DNQ	DNQ	DNQ	DNQ	DNQ	DNQ							DNQ	DNQ	0
	(United States) Ovitt	KTM							DNQ	DNQ			DNQ	DNQ	DNQ	DNQ							DNQ	DNQ	DNQ	DNQ	0
	(United States) Troyer	Yamaha							DNQ	DNQ			DNQ	DNQ							DNQ	DNQ	DNQ	DNQ	DNQ	DNQ	0
	(United States) Ray	Honda							DNQ	DNQ	DNQ	DNQ	DNQ	DNQ	DNQ	DNQ											0
	(United States) Berchem	Honda											DNQ	DNQ	DNQ	DNQ					DNQ	DNQ	DNQ	DNQ			0
	(United States) Peterson	Yamaha															DNQ	DNQ			DNQ	DNQ	DNQ	DNQ	DNQ	DNQ	0
	(United States) Prebula	KTM															DNQ	DNQ			DNQ	DNQ	DNQ	DNQ	DNQ	DNQ	0
	(United States) Monks	KTM			DNQ	DNQ	DNQ	DNQ																	DNQ	DNQ	0
	(United States) Launius	Honda							DNQ	DNQ			DNQ	DNQ											DNQ	DNQ	0
	(United States) Netti	Yamaha											DNQ	DNQ	DNQ	DNQ					DNQ	DNQ					0
	(United States) Lechien	KTM											DNQ	DNQ							DNQ	DNQ	DNQ	DNQ			0
	(United States) Neys	Honda											DNQ	DNQ			DNQ	DNQ							DNQ	DNQ	0
	(United States) Brill	Honda											DNQ	DNQ			DNQ	DNQ							DNQ	DNQ	0
	(United States) Fisk	Yamaha																			DNQ	DNQ	DNQ	DNQ	DNQ	DNQ	0
	(United States) Hall	Yamaha																			DNQ	DNQ	DNQ	DNQ	DNQ	DNQ	0
	(Canada) Pauk	Honda					DNQ	DNQ			DNQ	DNQ															0
	(United States) Demorest	KTM							DNQ	DNQ													DNQ	DNQ			0
	(United States) G. Smith	Suzuki							DNQ	DNQ													DNQ	DNQ			0
	(United States) Klann	Yamaha							DNQ	DNQ															DNQ	DNQ	0
	(United States) Lyon	Honda											DNQ	DNQ					DNQ	DNQ							0
	(United States) Bunch	Yamaha											DNQ	DNQ					DNQ	DNQ							0
	(United States) Burnett	KTM													DNQ	DNQ					DNQ	DNQ					0
	(United States) Delowery	Honda													DNQ	DNQ							DNQ	DNQ			0
	(United States) Strauss	KTM															DNQ	DNQ							DNQ	DNQ	0
	(United States) Wernig	Honda																			DNQ	DNQ	DNQ	DNQ			0
	(United States) Brouillard	KTM																			DNQ	DNQ	DNQ	DNQ			0
	(United States) Marty	Husqvarna																					DNQ	DNQ	DNQ	DNQ	0
	(United States) Philbrick	Suzuki																					DNQ	DNQ	DNQ	DNQ	0
	(United States) Thacker	KTM					DNQ	DNQ																			0
	(United States) Liston	Yamaha							DNQ	DNQ																	0
	(United States) Snyder	KTM									DNQ	DNQ															0
	(United States) Loberg	Husqvarna											DNQ	DNQ													0
	(United States) Prier	Honda											DNQ	DNQ													0
	(United States) S. Miller	Kawasaki											DNQ	DNQ													0
	(United States) Hancher	Kawasaki											DNQ	DNQ													0
	(United States) Blessing	Suzuki													DNQ	DNQ											0
	(United States) E. Williams	Honda													DNQ	DNQ											0
	(United States) Hutchinson	Yamaha													DNQ	DNQ											0
	(United States) Duymich	Honda													DNQ	DNQ											0
	(United States) DeBower	Husqvarna															DNQ	DNQ									0
	(Germany) Klakow	Husqvarna																	DNQ	DNQ							0
	(United States) Maley	Yamaha																	DNQ	DNQ							0
	(United States) Camp	Kawasaki																			DNQ	DNQ					0
	(United States) Dillin	Kawasaki																			DNQ	DNQ					0
	(United States) Robinson	Suzuki																			DNQ	DNQ					0
	(United States) Roth	Yamaha																					DNQ	DNQ			0
	(United States) Hardcastle	Honda																							DNQ	DNQ	0
	(United States) Persha	KTM																							DNQ	DNQ	0
	(United States) Kathan	Kawasaki																							DNQ	DNQ	0
	(United States) Fratz-Orr	KTM																							DNQ	DNQ	0
Pos	Rider	Bike	HAN (California)		GLN (California)		THU (Colorado)		HIG (Pennsylvania)		TEN (Tennessee)		RED (Michigan)		SOU (Massachusetts)		SPR (Minnesota)		WAS (Washington (state))		UNA (New York (state))		BUD (Maryland)		IRN (Indiana)		Points

== See also ==
- 2017 FIM Motocross World Championship
