= Daniel Lippman =

American reporter

- Born: April 7, 1990 (age 36); Great Barrington, Massachusetts
- Education: George Washington University
- Occupation: journalist

Daniel Lippman (born April 7, 1990) is an American journalist who covers the White House and Washington for Politico. He previously was co-author of Politico's Playbook newsletter for five years. His reporting has been referenced at times by presidents Barack Obama, Donald Trump, and Joe Biden. He is known for breaking stories about the inner workings of Washington and regularly appears as a political commentator on CNN, MSNBC, BBC and other networks.

== Early life ==
Lippman was born and raised in Great Barrington, Massachusetts. He attended the Hotchkiss School in Lakeville, Connecticut. Lippman is the son of psychiatrist David Lippman and garden designer and writer Honey Sharp. When he was 15, Lippman was profiled in The New Yorker by journalist Jon Mooallem, who covered his use of Ask the White House, a public forum to communicate with key administration members of former President George W. Bush. He was also profiled at the time by CNN. Lippman graduated from George Washington University in 2012.

== Career ==
During college, Lippman interned for publications including Reuters and McClatchy Newspapers. When Lippman was 19, he was profiled by Daniel Libit at Politico for his work as an "independent copy editor" and was chosen as Chris Wallace's Power Player of the Week on Fox News Sunday. He also traveled to the Turkish-Syrian border to cover the impact of the Syrian civil war for the Huffington Post and CNN.com in 2013.

Lippman joined Politico in 2014 to co-author its flagship newsletter Politico Playbook newsletter. While at Politico, Lippman has broken major stories on the presidential administrations of Donald Trump and Joe Biden, and broke news on U.S. Supreme Court Justice Brett Kavanaugh's encounter at Morton's Steakhouse. His piece in 2018 about how young Trump aides had trouble dating in Washington received lots of attention when it was published.

In 2016, Lippman fact-checked Trump for Politico Magazine and was recognized by former President Barack Obama during remarks at the ceremony for that year's Toner Prize for Excellence in Political Reporting. In March 2016, Lippman was featured on the cover of Washington Life's Young and the Guest List.

In 2018, Lippman broke a story on how former Trump aides saying the former president wanted to call Japanese Prime Minister Shinzo Abe at unconventional hours as a result of his difficulty understanding time zones.The story was referenced in an episode of The Late Show with Stephen Colbert.

Lippman's story with colleague Eliana Johnson on Trump saying he did not understand why George Washington did not name his Virginia compound after himself was referenced by the biographer Ron Chernow during the 2019 White House Correspondents Dinner: “Now, as best I can tell, [George] Washington committed only one major blunder as a president. He failed to put his name on Mount Vernon and thereby bungled an early opportunity at branding … Clearly deficient in the art of the deal, the poor man had to settle for the lowly title of father of his country. A very sad story.”

Lippman was first to report that Madeleine Westerhout, the former assistant to Donald Trump was fired after bragging to press that her relationship with the president was closer than his two daughters Ivanka and Tiffany as well as telling reporters that the former president did not like taking pictures with Tiffany because he believed her to be overweight. Donald Trump responded to Lippman's reporting: “You don’t say things like she said which were just a little bit hurtful to some people,” he said. Lippman interviewed Trump in 2019.

In 2021, Lippman was first to report on the cancellation of an indoor party the Interior Department was planning to celebrate the confirmation of Secretary Deb Haaland. After Lippman's story, the White House removed the department's chief of staff Jennifer Van der Heide who planned the event.

Later in 2021, Lippman and national security reporter Bryan Bender published interviews with 17 prominent former national security leaders, several of who expressed regret on post-9/11 policies related to the global war on terror.President Biden referenced Lippman's reporting while defending his exit from Afghanistan.

In 2022, Lippman reported that five administration officials who work with CBP Commissioner Chris Magnus described him as “unengaged” with his position. Magnus officially resigned less than a month after the article was published.

In late 2025, Lippman wrote a number of stories about the Trump-nominee for special counsel of the United States, Paul Ingrassia; including how he sent a series of racist text messages and that he had a “Nazi streak”.The day after the story broke, Ingrassia withdrew his nomination.

== Recognition ==
In 2016, Lippman was selected as an under 35 "must-know" name in media by LinkedIn for his work as co-author of Playbook. In 2021, the philanthropic initiative, Schmidt Futures, named Lippman as an international strategy fellow. Lippman was selected as a member of the Aspen Strategy Group's Rising Leaders Program class of 2022. He was a winner of the Breaking News award from Military Reporters and Editors in 2025 for a series of stories on a Pentagon leak investigation. He is represented by the speaking agency Leading Authorities, Inc.

== Personal life ==
Lippman married Sophia Narrett, an embroidery artist, on July 22, 2023.
