= Jeremy Martin (motocross racer) =

American motorcycle racer

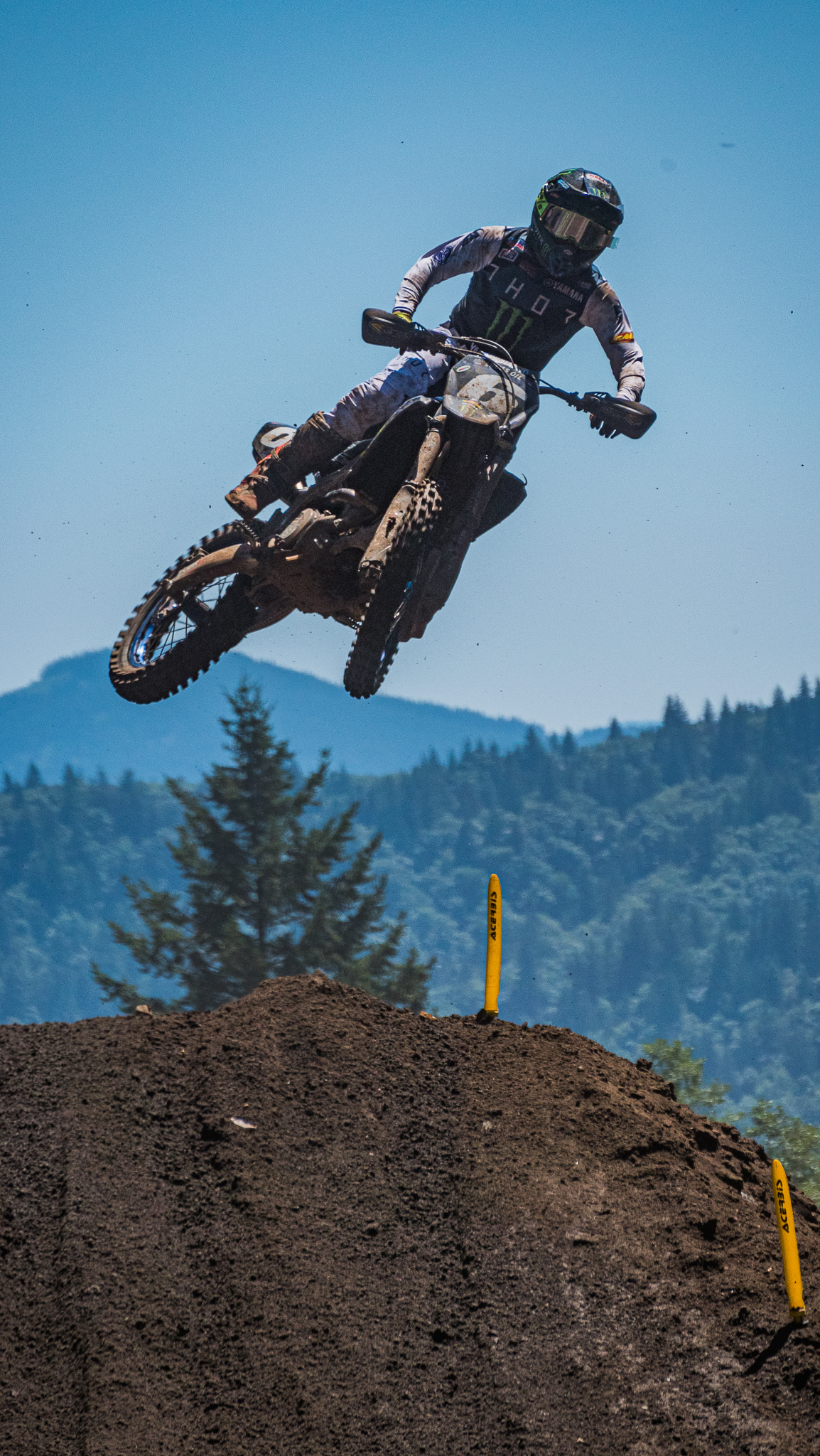
Jeremy Martin
- Nationality: (United States) American
- Born: May 11, 1993 (age 32); Millville, Minnesota, US

Motocross career
- Years active: 2012–2025
- Teams: •Muc-off FXR Club MX Yamaha (2022–2024); •Geico Honda (2017-2020); •Monster Energy Star Racing Yamaha (2012-2016, 2021-2022, 2025)
- Championships: •2014 AMA Motocross 250cc; •2015 AMA Motocross 250cc
- Wins: •AMA 250cc Motocross: 20; •AMA 250cc Supercross: 6; Total: 26

Jeremy Martin (born May 11, 1993) is an American retired Motocross and Supercross racer who competed in the AMA Supercross and Motocross championships from 2012 to 2025. He is a two-time AMA Motocross 250cc Champion.

== 250cc Career ==
=== 2014 ===
2014 saw Martin secure his first 250cc national title.

== AMA Supercross/Motocross results ==
| Year | Rnd 1 | Rnd 2 | Rnd 3 | Rnd 4 | Rnd 5 | Rnd 6 | Rnd 7 | Rnd 8 | Rnd 9 | Rnd 10 | Rnd 11 | Rnd 12 | Rnd 13 | Rnd 14 | Rnd 15 | Rnd 16 | Rnd 17 | Average Finish | Podium Percent | Place |
|---|---|---|---|---|---|---|---|---|---|---|---|---|---|---|---|---|---|---|---|---|
| 2014 250 MX | 1 | 1 | 3 | 2 | 7 | 1 | 2 | 1 | 3 | 2 | 8 | 1 | – | – | – | – | – | 2.67 | 83% | 1st |
| 2015 250 SX-E | – | – | – | – | – | – | 4 | 1 | 2 | 3 | OUT | 4 | 2 | – | – | 4 | OUT | 2.86 | 57% | 3rd |
| 2015 250 MX | 1 | 7 | 1 | 1 | 3 | 4 | 1 | 2 | 5 | 3 | 1 | 6 | – | – | – | – | – | 2.92 | 67% | 1st |
| 2016 250 SX-E | – | – | – | – | – | – | – | 4 | 1 | 2 | 13 | – | DNF | 1 | 2 | 3 | 15 | 5.13 | 63% | 3rd |
| 2017 250 MX | 11 | 2 | 3 | 1 | 9 | 3 | 5 | 4 | 7 | 1 | 4 | 4 | – | – | – | – | – | 4.50 | 42% | 2nd |
| 2018 250 SX-E | – | – | – | – | – | – | 5 | 12 | 5 | 2 | 2 | 1 | – | 1 | 4 | – | 5 | 4.11 | 44% | 3rd |
| 2020 250 MX | 3 | 1 | 1 | 1 | 4 | 2 | 3 | 3 | 2 | – | – | – | – | – | – | – | – | 2.22 | 89% | 2nd |
| 2025 250 MX | 21 | DNF | OUT | OUT | OUT | OUT | 2 | | | | | - | - | - | - | - | - | | | |
