= Michael Mosiman =

American motocross racer

- Nationality: American
- Born: 16 July 1999 (age 27); Sebastopol, California

Michael Mosiman (born 16 July 1999) is an American professional Motocross and Supercross racer. Mosiman was the winner of the San Diego round of the 2022 AMA Supercross Championship in the 250SX West class, his only supercross victory to date.

Mosiman has competed professionally in the AMA Supercross Championship and AMA Motocross Championship since his outdoor debut in 2017.

In addition to his supercross win, Mosiman also took one race win in the 2022 AMA National Motocross Championship.

After sustaining several injuries throughout his career, Mosiman held a retirement party in 2024 following fractures to his neck. Following advice from doctors that he faced no further risk from this injury, Mosiman returned to competition the following season.

Mosiman is the younger brother of Josh Mosiman, who has also competed in the AMA Motocross Championship.

== Career ==
=== Amateur career ===
Mosiman progressed through the ranks of the American amateur system, following his older brother in racing the AMA Amateur National Motocross Championship. During the years he competed on an 85 and a Supermini, he formed part of the Rockstar Suzuki Amateur Team. During this time, he finished third in the Supermini class at the Monster Cup in 2013. For his last two years as an amateur, he competed on a KTM and a Husqvarna, securing a second and two thirds at the Amateur Nationals.

=== 250 career ===
Rockstar Husqvarna

Mosiman made his professional debut in the 2017 AMA National Motocross Championship, as part of the Rockstar Energy Husqvarna Factory Racing team. He adjusted well to the 250 class, finishing eighth overall at the second round. Mosiman picked up a shoulder injury at the fourth round and missed the rest of the championship. He made his professional supercross debut in the 250SX East class of the 2018 AMA Supercross Championship, but missed the first two rounds due to concussion. Across the rounds he raced, he had a best finish of eighth and ended fifteenth in the standings. Mosiman finished eleventh in the 2018 AMA National Motocross Championship, becoming a more regular feature in the top-ten during the second half of the season.

Mosiman took a step forward in the 2019 AMA Supercross Championship, with a best finish of fourth alongside six other top-ten finishes, he finished sixth in the final standings of the 250SX West class. His progress continued in the 2019 AMA National Motocross Championship, picking up his first podium at the third round at Thunder Valley. After two more top-three race finishes and a number of top-fives, Mosiman finished the series in eighth overall. Mosiman continued picking up maiden podiums during the COVID-19 pandemic-hit 2020 AMA Supercross Championship, finishing third at the fourth and final rounds, to end the season fifth in 250SX West. A practice crash following the conclusion of the supercross season, saw Mosiman miss the entire 2020 AMA National Motocross Championship.

Troy Lee Designs Red Bull Gas Gas

For the 2021 season, Mosiman moved from the Rockstar Husqvarna team, to join the first factory Gas Gas squad in America. Racing in the 250SX East class, Mosiman secured two more podiums and as in the previous supercross season, finished fifth in his class standings. During the outdoor season, he matched his podium count of the previous season, finishing second overall at the sixth and eleventh rounds. He would miss the eighth and ninth rounds due to injuries sustained in a practice crash and would finish the championship in eighth. Mosiman competed in the 250SX West class of the 2022 AMA Supercross Championship, taking his first win at the third round of the championship in San Diego, where he led every lap of the main event. Throughout the rest of the season, Mosiman stood on the podium four more times, before finishing the championship in third in the final standings. His first supercross win was followed by his first outdoor race win, when he was victorious in the opening race at the second round of the 2022 AMA National Motocross Championship. A crash in the second race ended his chances of the overall win and a tough second half of the season, where he missed multiple rounds due to injury, saw him end ninth in the standings.

After recovering from a broken neck sustained at the penultimate outdoor round in 2022, Mosiman competed in the 250SX East class of the 2023 AMA Supercross Championship. At the fourth round at Daytona, Mosiman crashed out and sustained a head injury that ruled him out for the rest of the supercross campaign. Returning for the 2023 AMA National Motocross Championship, crashed out of the second round, picking up a shoulder injury that ruled him out of the rest of the season due to required surgery.

Monster Energy Star Racing Yamaha

Whilst initially left without a deal for the 2024 season, Mosiman eventually signed for Monster Energy Star Racing Yamaha on a multi-year deal. After only riding two rounds of the 2024 AMA Supercross Championship, Mosiman hoped to compete in the full 2024 AMA National Motocross Championship season. However, a crash prior to the opening round resulted in fractures in his neck. With the severity of the injury, Mosiman considered his future in the sport, organising a retirement party to seemingly call time on his career.

After being told by doctors that there was no further risk of injury once the neck fractures had healed, Mosiman surprised many by lining up in the 250SX West class of the 2025 AMA Supercross Championship. In what was a comeback season after two years dogged by injuries, Mosiman scored a podium at the fifth round in Arlington, Texas, finishing seventh in the final standings. He also scored a single podium in the 2025 AMA National Motocross Championship, but missed the final round due to injuries and a concussion sustained in a crash at the penultimate event. Mosiman returned for the 250SX West class of the 2026 AMA Supercross Championship, securing two podiums across the first three rounds. Whilst training ahead of the seventh round, Mosiman crashed and sustained multiple injuries to his elbow, arm and hand. This ruled him out of the remaining supercross rounds, with him ending eighth in the final standings. Returning from injury, Mosiman competed in the full 2026 AMA National Motocross Championship season, ending the standings in ninth and finishing second in the first race at the Spring Creek round as the highlight. Mosiman did not complete the 2026 SuperMotocross World Championship playoff rounds, picking up a broken collarbone in practice at the first of the three rounds.

Following the conclusion of the season, Mosiman announced that he had left the Star Racing Yamaha team after three years with them.

== Honours ==
AMA Supercross Championship

- 250SX West: 2022 (bronze)

AMA Amateur National Motocross Championship

- Open Pro Sport: 2016 (bronze)
- 250 B: 2015 (bronze)
- 250 B Limited: 2015 (silver)
- Super Mini 1 (12–15): 2013 (silver)
- 65 (7–9) Stock: 2009 (silver)

Monster Energy Cup

- Supermini: 2013 (bronze)

== Career statistics ==
=== AMA Supercross Championship ===
==== By season ====
Season	Class	Number	Motorcycle	Team	Overall Wins	Overall Podium	Pts	Plcd
2018	250SX East	64	Husqvarna	Rockstar Energy Husqvarna Factory Racing	0	0	51	15th
2019	250SX West	36	Husqvarna	Rockstar Energy Husqvarna Factory Racing	0	0	144	6th
2020	250SX West	28	Husqvarna	Rockstar Energy Husqvarna Factory Racing	0	2	139	5th
2021	250SX East	42	Gas Gas	Troy Lee Designs Red Bull Gas Gas	0	2	124	5th
2022	250SX West	29	Gas Gas	Troy Lee Designs Red Bull Gas Gas	1	5	197	3rd
2023	250SX East	31	Gas Gas	Troy Lee Designs Red Bull Gas Gas	0	0	51	19th
2024	250SX West	76	Yamaha	Monster Energy Star Racing Yamaha	0	0	20	22nd
2025	250SX West	93	Yamaha	Monster Energy Star Racing Yamaha	0	1	131	7th
2026	250SX West	23	Yamaha	Monster Energy Star Racing Yamaha	0	2	107	8th
Total					1	12	964	

=== AMA National Motocross Championship ===
==== By season ====
Season	Class	Number	Motorcycle	Team	Races	Race Wins	Overall Wins	Race Top-3	Overall Podium	Pts	Plcd
2017	250	342	Husqvarna	Rockstar Energy Husqvarna Factory Racing	8	0	0	0	0	64	22nd
2018	250	64	Husqvarna	Rockstar Energy Husqvarna Factory Racing	24	0	0	0	0	233	11th
2019	250	36	Husqvarna	Rockstar Energy Husqvarna Factory Racing	22	0	0	3	1	290	8th
2021	250	42	Gas Gas	Troy Lee Designs Red Bull Gas Gas	18	0	0	4	2	252	8th
2022	250	29	Gas Gas	Troy Lee Designs Red Bull Gas Gas	16	1	0	1	0	208	9th
2023	250	31	Gas Gas	Troy Lee Designs Red Bull Gas Gas	4	0	0	0	0	20	30th
2025	250	93	Yamaha	Monster Energy Star Racing Yamaha	17	0	0	0	1	180	13th
2026	250	23	Yamaha	Monster Energy Star Racing Yamaha	22	0	0	1	0	187	9th
Total					131	1	0	9	4	1434	
