= 2018 AMA National Motocross Championship =

The 2018 AMA Motocross Championship season is the 46th AMA Motocross National Championship season, the premier motocross series in USA. Eli Tomac goes into the season as the defending champion in the 450 class, after taking his first 450 national title in 2017. This was Tomac's second AMA motocross title, after taking the 250 class in 2013. In the 250 class Zach Osborne is the defending champion after taking his maiden title last season.

== Calendar and Results ==
=== 450cc ===
Round	Date	Location	Race 1 Winner	Race 2 Winner	Round Winner
1	May 19	(California) Hangtown Motocross Classic	(United States) Eli Tomac	(United States) Eli Tomac	(United States) Eli Tomac
2	May 26	(California) Glen Helen National	(United States) Eli Tomac	(United States) Eli Tomac	(United States) Eli Tomac
3	June 2	(Colorado) Thunder Valley National	(United States) Eli Tomac	(United States) Eli Tomac	(United States) Eli Tomac
4	June 16	(Pennsylvania) High Point National	(France) Marvin Musquin	(United States) Eli Tomac	(United States) Eli Tomac
5	June 23	Tennessee National	(United States) Eli Tomac	(France) Marvin Musquin	(United States) Eli Tomac
6	July 30	(Massachusetts) Southwick National	(United States) Eli Tomac	(France) Marvin Musquin	(France) Marvin Musquin
7	July 7	(Michigan) Red Bud National	(Germany) Ken Roczen	(France) Marvin Musquin	(France) Marvin Musquin
8	July 21	(Minnesota) Spring Creek National	(United States) Eli Tomac	(United States) Eli Tomac	(United States) Eli Tomac
9	July 28	(Washington (state)) Washougal National	(United States) Eli Tomac	(United States) Eli Tomac	(United States) Eli Tomac
10	August 11	(New York (state)) Unadilla National	(United States) Eli Tomac	(France) Marvin Musquin	(France) Marvin Musquin
11	August 18	(Maryland) Budds Creek National	(Germany) Ken Roczen	(United States) Eli Tomac	(United States) Eli Tomac
12	August 25	(Indiana) Ironman National	(United States) Justin Barcia	(United States) Justin Barcia	(United States) Justin Barcia

=== 250cc ===
Round	Date	Location	Race 1 Winner	Race 2 Winner	Round Winner
1	May 19	(California) Hangtown Motocross Classic	(United States) Zach Osborne	(United States) Zach Osborne	(United States) Zach Osborne
2	May 26	(California) Glen Helen National	(United States) Aaron Plessinger	(United States) Aaron Plessinger	(United States) Aaron Plessinger
3	June 2	(Colorado) Thunder Valley National	(United States) Justin Cooper	(United States) Jeremy Martin	(United States) Jeremy Martin
4	June 16	(Pennsylvania) High Point National	(United States) Aaron Plessinger	(United States) Aaron Plessinger	(United States) Aaron Plessinger
5	June 23	Tennessee National	(United States) Jeremy Martin	(France) Dylan Ferrandis	(United States) Shane McElrath
6	July 30	(Massachusetts) Southwick National	(United States) Austin Forkner	(France) Dylan Ferrandis	(France) Dylan Ferrandis
7	July 7	(Michigan) Red Bud National	(United States) Aaron Plessinger	(United States) Aaron Plessinger	(United States) Aaron Plessinger
8	July 21	(Minnesota) Spring Creek National	(United States) Aaron Plessinger	(United States) Aaron Plessinger	(United States) Aaron Plessinger
9	July 28	(Washington (state)) Washougal National	(United States) Joey Savatgy	(United States) Shane McElrath	(United States) Aaron Plessinger
10	August 11	(New York (state)) Unadilla National	(France) Dylan Ferrandis	(France) Dylan Ferrandis	(France) Dylan Ferrandis
11	August 18	(Maryland) Budds Creek National	(United States) Aaron Plessinger	(United States) RJ Hampshire	(United States) RJ Hampshire
12	August 25	(Indiana) Ironman National	(United States) Aaron Plessinger	(United States) Aaron Plessinger	(United States) Aaron Plessinger

== 450cc ==
=== Entry list ===
Team	Constructor	No	Rider	Rounds
Monster Energy Kawasaki	Kawasaki	1	(United States) Eli Tomac	All
Monster Energy Kawasaki	Kawasaki	33	(United States) Joshua Grant	9
Monster Energy Yamaha	Yamaha	2	(United States) Cooper Webb	6–12
Monster Energy Yamaha	Yamaha	51	(United States) Justin Barcia	All
Monster Energy Yamaha	Yamaha	91	(United States) Alex Ray	2–5
Rocky Mountain ATV/MC KTM	KTM	4	(United States) Blake Baggett	All
Rocky Mountain ATV/MC KTM	KTM	60	(United States) Benny Bloss	All
51FIFTY Energy Drink Yamaha	Yamaha	11	(United States) Kyle Chisholm	1–4
Autotrader JGR Suzuki	Suzuki	19	(United States) Justin Bogle	6–9
Autotrader JGR Suzuki	Suzuki	22	(Australia) Chad Reed	12
Autotrader JGR Suzuki	Suzuki	34	(United States) Weston Peick	1–11
Autotrader JGR Suzuki	Suzuki	46	(United States) Justin Hill	4–10, 12
Autotrader JGR Suzuki	Suzuki	54	(United States) Phillip Nicoletti	1–3
Rockstar Energy Husqvarna	Husqvarna	21	(United States) Jason Anderson	1–2, 11–12
Rockstar Energy Husqvarna	Husqvarna	54	(United States) Phillip Nicoletti	4–12
Red Bull KTM	KTM	25	(France) Marvin Musquin	All
Red Bull KTM	KTM	557	(United States) Kailub Russell	10
Team Honda HRC	Honda	32	(United States) Christian Craig	1–2
Team Honda HRC	Honda	94	(Germany) Ken Roczen	All
Team Honda HRC	Honda	718	(Japan) Toshiki Tomita	All
	Suzuki	39	(United States) Kyle Cunningham	1–2, 4–12
	Honda	44	(Venezuela) Lorenzo Locurcio	3–9, 12
Triggr Racing	Yamaha	48	(United States) Henry Miller	3–8, 10–12
Triggr Racing	Kawasaki	69	(United States) Tyler Bowers	9
Traders Racing	Yamaha	49	(United States) Nick Gaines	4–8, 10–12
Team Taft	Husqvarna	53	(United States) Bradley Taft	1–2
TPJ/Fly Racing	Yamaha	57	(United States) John Short	7–12
TPJ/Fly Racing	Yamaha	86	(United States) Dylan Merriam	All
TPJ/Fly Racing	KTM	596	(United States) Carson Tickle	All
TPJ/Fly Racing	KTM	823	(United States) Logan France	11
TPJ/Fly Racing	Honda	907	(United States) Ben LaMay	1–4
Phoenix Racing	Honda	61	(United States) Heath Harrison	4–8
Phoenix Racing	Honda	907	(United States) Ben LaMay	5–12
Phoenix Racing	Honda	910	(United States) Carson Brown	9
HD Supply	Husqvarna	71	(United States) Joshua Mosiman	1–2
3D Racing	Yamaha	73	(United States) Brandon Scharer	All
George Gee Auto Company	Yamaha	75	(United States) Noah McConahy	3, 9
Nut Up	KTM	77	(United States) Ryan Surratt	3, 9–12
WELIVIN	Suzuki	79	(United States) Nick Schmidt	3, 9
Ride365.com	Husqvarna	81	(United States) Chase Marquier	3, 5, 7–8
Latitude Graphics/BWR Engines Racing	Honda	82	(United States) Cody Williams	4–5, 7
FCC Motorsports	Honda	89	(United States) Jerry Robin	5, 8
Pulp MX	Yamaha	91	(United States) Alex Ray	7, 9
Club MX Redemption Racing	KTM	95	(United States) Joseph Crown	6, 8, 12
Fusion Motorsports	KTM	96	(United States) Zack Williams	5, 7–8, 10, 12
Advanced Concrete	Kawasaki	120	(United States) Todd Bannister	3
Enviro Dynamics Crownkiwi	Honda	121	(New Zealand) Cody Cooper	All
JMC Motorsports	Husqvarna	122	(United States) Chris Howell	1–3, 9
Absolute Race Technology	Honda	124	(United States) Robert Fitch Jr.	3
	KTM	126	(United States) Jamie Discher	12
	Yamaha	128	(United States) Sean Swett	11
	KTM	129	(United States) Ryan Diezic	10–11
VCV Racing	Yamaha	135	(United States) Trampas Newman	7–8
Sportland 2 LaPorte Racing	Honda	139	(United States) Nathen LaPorte	All
RMXSeries.com	KTM	140	(United States) Austin Kouba	1, 3, 9
RMXSeries.com	Honda	482	(United States) Riley Brough	1–9
RMXSeries.com	Honda	544	(United States) Morgan Burger	9
Fletchall Racing	Honda	142	(United States) Collin Fletchall	5, 7–8
Sportland 2	Yamaha	143	(United States) Zach Coons	3–4, 7–8
His 956 Facility	Yamaha	146	(United States) Jake Masterpool	1, 3, 5–8, 11–12
TRD	Suzuki	148	(United States) Connar Troyer	4–5, 7–8, 12
TMC Hammer Nutrition	Husqvarna	150	(United States) Austin Walton	1–2, 9
Han's Motorsports & Suspensions	KTM	152	(United States) Ryder Hanninen	7–8, 12
Mitchell Motorsports	Kawasaki	156	(United States) Jacob Hayes	5
	Yamaha	163	(United States) Devin Culbreth	4–6, 11
Redemption Racing	KTM	174	(United States) Joshua Osby	12
Redemption Racing	KTM	338	(Canada) Eric Jeffery	12
Green Acres	Yamaha	176	(United States) Seth Green	7, 12
Gebken Racing	Honda	180	(United States) Christopher Gebken	3–5
TPJ Racing	Suzuki	181	(United States) Dustin Pipes	1–2
Vickery Motorsports	Honda	191	(United States) Derek Anderson	3, 7
	Yamaha	192	(United States) Frank Peneno	10–12
Ward Racing	KTM	195	(United States) Keaton Ward	9, 11–12
Rookstool Racing	Honda	196	(United States) Kevin Rookstool	9
Maxima Racing	Husqvarna	198	(United States) Edgar Foedish III	1, 3
Thomsen Racing Honda	Honda	200	(Denmark) Joachim Falden	1–2
JM Environmental	Honda	207	(United States) Dare DeMartile	All
Integrity Racing	Honda	210	(United States) Jonathan Mayzak	6
Barr Custom Cutters	Yamaha	213	(United States) Jon-Murray Barr	8
	Kawasaki	215	(United States) Christian Cicero	1–2
Harriman Racing	KTM	216	(United States) Devin Harriman	1–2, 9
Altitude Racing MX	Kawasaki	225	(United States) Brett Stralo	2–3
Gilliam Racing	KTM	227	(United States) Cory Gilliam	3–7, 10–12
TZR	Kawasaki	230	(United States) Travis Sewell	7–8, 12
Tucker Cantrell Racing	Yamaha	235	(United States) Tucker Cantrell	5
DCR	Yamaha	237	(United States) David Costa	6, 10
Barrett Heritage Racing	Yamaha	240	(United States) Bryce Stewart	3
	KTM	241	(United States) TJ Albright	6, 10–11
Championship Powersports	Honda	243	(United States) Hunter Braun	4, 8, 10, 12
Fusion Graphix	Honda	246	(United States) Chance Blackburn	4–6, 9
TJ's Cycle	KTM	250	(United States) Forrest Player	3
	KTM	252	(United States) Collin Reinhart	8
Slo Joe Racing	Honda	257	(United States) Joey DeNeen	4–5, 11
Fratz-Orr Racing	KTM	265	(United States) Nick Fratz-Orr	4–8, 10–12
Runkles Racing	KTM	270	(United States) Jacob Runkles	3–8, 10–12
Power Motorsports	Kawasaki	272	(United States) Rory Sullivan	9
Blizzard Racing	Honda	287	(United States) John Snow	4–5, 7, 12
North American Warhorse	Kawasaki	289	(United States) Schae Thomas	4–6, 10–11
	Husqvarna	293	(United States) Michael Ashe	5
Snyder Racing	Yamaha	299	(United States) Tucker Snyder	5
Harford Air Services	KTM	302	(United States) Nick Hess	11–12
Plainview Powersports	Kawasaki	308	(United States) Nicholas Jackson	8
Plainview Powersports	Kawasaki	708	(United States) Joseph Perron	8
Smith Racing	Honda	309	(United States) Jeremy Smith	4–7
	Kawasaki	311	(United States) Mitchell Gifford	3
Holeshot Cycles	Honda	312	(United States) Chris Makuta	All
Tomahawk MX	Kawasaki	314	(United States) Tyler Stepek	4–5, 10–11
Central Mass Powersports	Suzuki	317	(United States) Richard Tolman-Moschetti	6, 10
Diamond Motorsports	Yamaha	319	(United States) Coty Schock	4, 6–7, 10–11
Sorensen MX Training	Suzuki	320	(United States) Colby Sorensen	3
	Honda	321	(South Africa) Bradley Lionnet	1–3, 7, 11–12
Cooper Racing	Yamaha	324	(United States) James Cooper	4–5, 7–8, 12
California Coast Plumbers/TPJ	KTM	329	(United States) Chad Gores	1–2
Factory Connection	KTM	330	(United States) Cade Autenrieth	1–7
Hand Racing	Honda	332	(United States) Jeremy Hand	4–5, 7–8, 10, 12
	Honda	339	(United States) Bryan Bachman	4, 7
Callahan MX School	Kawasaki	347	(United States) Daniel Callahan	11
	KTM	349	(United States) Alex Sigismondi	10
Alias MX	Husqvarna	351	(United States) Eric Grondahl	6
Blackstock Motorsports	Yamaha	364	(Canada) Mitchell Goheen	12
	KTM	368	(United States) Stephen Czarnota	6
Manchester Honda KTM	KTM	376	(United States) Chris Canning	5–6, 10
Stewarts Heating Racing	Kawasaki	388	(United States) Brandan Leith	1–9
Peterson Racing	Honda	399	(United States) Broc Peterson	5
Frank Craven Racing Team	Honda	400	(United States) Nicholas Peterson	1–3, 5–8
Gateway Kawasaki	Kawasaki	401	(United States) Sam Redman	3
Greenawalt Racing	Yamaha	402	(United States) Samuel Greenawalt	4–5, 11–12
Cooperstown Sand and Gravel	Honda	407	(United States) Benjamin Nelko	10
	Honda	408	(United States) Edward Tomaszek	6, 10, 12
KMS Heating & Cooling	Suzuki	412	(United States) Jared Lesher	7–8, 10–12
Tech Care Honda	Honda	413	(United States) Konnor Buffis	6
Grgurich Racing	Yamaha	415	(United States) Brendan Grgurich	7–8, 12
DTA Racing	KTM	421	(United States) Jesse Kirchmeyer	6, 10, 12
Bunch Racing	Yamaha	436	(United States) Jason Bunch	1–2
Tri County Honda	Honda	437	(United States) Charles Bright	4
	Honda	442	(United States) Zachary Johnson	6
Podium Works	Honda	444	(United States) Brock Papi	4–5, 7, 10–12
Geeleher Enterprises	KTM	445	(United States) Conor Sheridan	10–11
RJC Racing	Kawasaki	447	(United States) Deven Raper	1–3, 9
Kessler Pro Suspension	Honda	449	(United States) Dakota Kessler	7, 10–11
Erie Insurance	KTM	451	(United States) Klay Prager	4–5, 7, 10–11
Buildbase Honda	Honda	454	(United Kingdom) Jake Nicholls	7
Motowhips	KTM	455	(United States) Justin Ashburn	5
	Suzuki	461	(United States) Thomas Richards	3, 9
A1 Vacuum	Honda	467	(United States) Forrest Smith	3, 5
Delmarva Powersports	Kawasaki	468	(United States) Austin Walker	11
Impens Racing	Honda	472	(United States) Jake Impens	3–4, 10
Scouten Racing	KTM	475	(United States) Timothy Scouten	4–5, 7, 10–11
RF Motorsports USA	Kawasaki	476	(United States) Collin Jurin	9
Coen Racing	Honda	479	(United States) James Coen	10
Randanella Septic Inc.	Honda	489	(United States) Ricci Randanella	10–11
	KTM	493	(United States) Mason Price	11
Fastmann Racing	Honda	495	(United States) Aaron Houser	4–5, 10–11
SLMX School	KTM	505	(Guam) Sean Lipanovich	1–2
Canvas MX	Yamaha	507	(United States) Nicholas Tomasunas	4–5
Nagy Racing	KTM	509	(United States) Alexander Nagy	7–8
	Honda	510	(United States) Travis Prier	3, 7
	Yamaha	513	(United States) Aerian Weaver	4–5, 10–12
Triangle Cycles	Yamaha	525	(United States) Luke Neese	10–12
	Yamaha	528	(United States) Ryan Peters	7–9
	Husqvarna	537	(France) Valentin Teillet	12
VPE Yamaha	Yamaha	538	(United States) Addison Emory IV	8, 10
Siler Racing	Yamaha	545	(United States) Cody Siler	7, 12
Rob's Performance	Honda	546	(United States) Tylor Skodras	3, 7–8, 10
Perri's Powersports	Honda	550	(United States) John Citrola	2–3, 9
Patch Master Racing	Honda	553	(United States) Brent Rouse	1–3, 5–10
	Kawasaki	555	(Canada) Tyler Medaglia	12
	Kawasaki	558	(United States) Scott Clark	11
Motorbikes Plus	Husqvarna	560	(United States) Kyle Murdoch	6–7, 11
Underground RC	Husqvarna	561	(United States) Caleb Hall	4, 7
	Kawasaki	566	(United States) Jacob Rose	11
Sessink Racing	Honda	567	(United States) Christian Sessink	7
Woodstock KTM	KTM	570	(United States) Cody Vanbuskirk	8
	KTM	577	(Mexico) Félix López Guttiérez	2–3, 5–6, 8
O'Dell Racing	Suzuki	579	(United States) Alex O'Dell	4
Land N Sea Racing	Kawasaki	580	(United States) Bobby Tiso	6
Brewer Cycles	Honda	581	(United States) Kyle Bitterman	5
RS Racing	Husqvarna	583	(United States) Corey Ridel	10
Ludwigsen Racing	Kawasaki	585	(United States) Bradley Ludwigsen	9
G-Force Powersports	Honda	589	(United States) Joey Olson	3
Okstorage.com Racing	KTM	591	(United States) Tanner Myers	8, 12
	Kawasaki	593	(Ecuador) Andrés Benenaula	7–8
Team Carey	KTM	597	(United States) Mason Kerr	4–6, 8
Litz Racing	Honda	599	(United States) Benjamin Lee	3
Two Tire Take Over	Yamaha	600	(United States) Connor Olson	3, 11
Endriss Racing	Yamaha	607	(United States) Kyle Endriss	4, 6, 10–11
Pilgrim Powersports	Kawasaki	611	(United States) Jacob Morrison	6
Tom Zont Racing	Yamaha	622	(United States) Zac Maley	3–5, 8
Cernic's Racing	Honda	624	(United States) Garrett Smith	11
Motorbikesplus KTM	KTM	626	(United States) Matthew Desjardins	6
Motorbikesplus KTM	KTM	776	(United States) Ryan Dowd	6, 10
Motorbikesplus KTM	KTM	859	(United States) Alex Higley	6
The Dirt Shop	Honda	627	(Colombia) Daniel Jaramillo	6–7, 11
Roseville Yamaha	Yamaha	636	(United States) Keith Knight	1, 9
MGX Unlimited	Honda	637	(United States) Robert Piazza	1–6, 8–12
SSB Motorsports	KTM	644	(United States) Brennan Myers	8
Malcolm Smith Motorsports	Husqvarna	647	(United States) Matthew Hubert	1–2, 7–9
SC Precision	Honda	649	(United States) Corey Burnett	10
Pro Tec Coatings	Yamaha	650	(United States) Cody Johnston	1–2
Peters Racing	Yamaha	652	(United States) Luke Peters	7–8
	Kawasaki	661	(United States) Noah Chambers	11
Motorsports Nation	KTM	677	(United States) Maurice Healy	6
Freedom Cycles	KTM	681	(United States) Jeff Crutcher	5–8
On the Pipe Racing	Honda	684	(United States) Justis Heckendorf	8
SGB Racing	Honda	688	(United States) Gabe Woodrow	4–6, 10–11
MPH Honda	Honda	696	(United States) Nick Kraeger	10
Akaydin Racing	Honda	704	(United States) Michael Akaydin	3–5, 7–8, 12
Team Lane Racing	KTM	711	(United States) Tristan Lane	5–7
The Privateer Journey	Honda	722	(United States) Adam Enticknap	9
Enticknap Racing	Honda	723	(United States) Tyler Enticknap	9–12
Motorsport Hillsboro	KTM	726	(United States) Gared Steinke	1–6, 8–11
PR2 Racing	Suzuki	727	(United States) Bradley Esper	4, 10–12
	Yamaha	728	(United States) Cameron Dowell	5–6, 10–12
Bugbee Racing	Yamaha	729	(United States) Phillip Bugbee	4, 6, 10–11
McBride Racing	KTM	732	(United States) Josh McBride	9
Munn Racing	KTM	736	(United States) Kenneth Venarchick	11–12
Sandy Crack Racing	Husqvarna	738	(United States) Kyle Hameister	8
Stemteck USA	Kawasaki	743	(Italy) Nicolò Gobbi	1–2
	Suzuki	744	(United States) Thomas Giambrone	6
Ragin Ron	KTM	749	(United States) James Manni	6
Allen Racing	Honda	754	(United States) Tyler Allen	8
Cycles R Us	Honda	759	(United States) Michael Norris	3
	KTM	761	(United States) Matt Tovani	10
	Honda	763	(United States) James Henshaw	8
Bonzi Suspension and Chassis	Yamaha	764	(United States) Leo Demastry	4, 7, 10–11
Shondeck Racing	Honda	768	(United States) Cole Shondeck	3
	Yamaha	769	(United States) Andrew Rossi	6, 10
Ramtrax Racing	KTM	774	(United States) Robert Marshall	6
Triple Seven Motorsports	KTM	777	(United States) Tristan Titus	5, 12
Raskovich Racing	Yamaha	780	(United States) Blake Raskovich	8
	Kawasaki	788	(United States) Josh Heintz	4–5, 7, 10–12
All Motor Performance	Yamaha	794	(United States) Bryce Backaus	7–8, 12
Bidus Racing	Yamaha	796	(United States) Michael Bidus	5–7
	Suzuki	802	(United States) Marshall MacIntyre	6, 10–11
MX Athletics	Honda	805	(United States) Carlen Gardner	7–8
	Suzuki	807	(Germany) Kai Haase	8
SGB Racing	Yamaha	808	(United States) Joshua Bock	4–6
Speed Technologies	Yamaha	809	(United States) Travis Thompson	7, 12
B. DeVries & Sons	KTM	813	(United States) Aaron Lampi	6
South of the Border MX	Yamaha	826	(United States) Matthew Burkeen	5, 7
	Suzuki	829	(United States) Taylor VonBeek	11
	Suzuki	830	(United States) Mason Price	6
Melo Design Co.	Suzuki	833	(United States) Tyler Hayes	10
Championship Powersports Racing	Honda	841	(United States) Jeffrey Walker	6
Starr Cycle	Honda	850	(United States) Cody Slark	8
Montreuil Racing	KTM	861	(United States) Eric Montreuil	7
Riggs Outdoors	Kawasaki	862	(United States) Ozzy Barbaree	12
	Kawasaki	874	(United States) Arik Swan	1–2, 9
	KTM	876	(United States) Christopher Alldredge	1–3, 9
Reactive Lifestyle	Yamaha	878	(United States) Eric Mckay	11
Lorenz Racing	Husqvarna	881	(United States) Gerald Lorenz III	4, 7, 12
Team 887	Honda	886	(United States) Shane Kelleher	6
CJ Racing	KTM	889	(United States) Cody Williams	6
	KTM	894	(United States) Dwight Dillon	3, 9
JBone Motorworks	KTM	895	(United States) Jack Pagano	6
Forever Two Wheels	Yamaha	897	(United States) Blake Ballard	1
Uebrick Racing	Yamaha	899	(United States) Kevin Uebrick	6, 10–11
Smith Racing	Yamaha	909	(United States) Jacob Smith	1–6, 9
Overdrive Automotive LLC	Yamaha	912	(United States) Brandon Albright	11
Anklesavers	Honda	914	(United States) Brice Klippel	7, 12
Enzo Racing	Honda	916	(United States) Jorge Rubacalva	1–2, 5
Haeseker Racing	Yamaha	917	(United States) Drew Thomas	1, 3, 9
TMM	Honda	921	(United States) Isaac Teasdale	11–12
	KTM	923	(United States) Chris Moore	10
	Honda	925	(Argentina) Jeremías Fernández	1
Buyit Reality	Honda	932	(United States) Jared Schudel	5–7
JMC Motorsports	Husqvarna	935	(United States) Sebastian Lave	4–5, 8–12
James Flooring & Construction	Honda	946	(United States) Dillon James	9
Team Five Four Racing	Honda	954	(United States) Matthew Hougentogler	11
Gary Bailey MX Schools	Yamaha	961	(United States) Mario Testa	4–7, 10–12
Tait Racing	Yamaha	962	(United States) Joseph Tait	10
ASM Group	Yamaha	967	(United States) Mateo Johnson	8
MM Racing	Husqvarna	975	(United States) Jake Loberg	8, 12
Maus Racing	KTM	979	(United States) Philip Maus	7–8, 12
U of MX	Honda	981	(United States) Austin Politelli	9
Defy Graphics	Honda	985	(United States) John Fortner	3, 9
Team JKopMX	Husqvarna	986	(United States) Lane Shaw	5
	KTM	987	(United States) Matthew Babbitt	10
Sanchez Racing Team	Honda	994	(United States) Juan Sánchez	6, 10
Team Imperial	KTM	995	(United States) Christopher Prebula	4–8, 10–12
Team LMR	KTM	998	(United States) Chris Lykens	6
Snuffy Racing	Suzuki	999	(United States) Joseph Gerrior	1, 3, 9

=== Riders Championship ===
Pos	Rider	Bike	HAN (California)		GLN (California)		THU (Colorado)		HIG (Pennsylvania)		TEN (Tennessee)		SOU (Massachusetts)		RED (Michigan)		SPR (Minnesota)		WAS (Washington (state))		UNA (New York (state))		BUD (Maryland)		IRN (Indiana)		Points
1	(United States) Tomac	Kawasaki	1	1	1	1	1	1	2	1	1	3	1	2	Ret	9	1	1	1	1	1	2	3	1	2	9	527
2	(France) Musquin	KTM	2	2	2	3	4	4	1	2	5	1	2	1	2	1	4	2	2	3	2	1	2	4	4	3	511
3	(Germany) Roczen	Honda	6	16	3	8	2	2	7	3	3	4	5	5	1	3	2	3	3	2	7	7	1	3	3	2	445
4	(United States) Barcia	Yamaha	3	3	6	4	5	6	3	5	2	2	3	3	4	2	5	5	5	4	8	3	6	5	1	1	444
5	(United States) Baggett	KTM	7	4	5	9	3	3	5	7	4	5	4	4	5	5	3	4	6	5	5	6	5	2	16	5	391
6	(United States) Nicoletti	Suzuki	9	9	10	7	8	8																			311
6	(United States) Nicoletti	Husqvarna							16	9	7	9	10	8	6	6	8	10	9	12	3	5	7	6	6	7	311
7	(United States) Bloss	KTM	10	5	22	6	6	5	6	8	9	8	6	6	3	23	11	8	7	10	4	10	9	8	11	11	298
8	(United States) Peick	Suzuki	5	7	7	5	7	7	9	4	6	6	9	11	8	11	6	6	12	6	9	8	14	9			291
9	(United States) Webb	Yamaha											8	9	7	7	7	9	8	7	16	4	8	7	9	4	186
10	(United States) Cunningham	Suzuki	Ret	13	8	Ret			10	12	11	10	Ret	13	11	8	12	16	11	8	28	11	10	13	12	20	169
11	(New Zealand) Cooper	Honda	15	12	16	10	17	11	8	10	20	11	Ret	16	14	12	15	24	17	11	12	14	18	15	Ret	Ret	146
12	(United States) Hill	Suzuki							4	6	8	7	21	DNS	10	4	10	7	4	Ret	Ret	DNS			10	Ret	143
13	(United States) Miller	Yamaha					19	16	20	17	10	19	12	Ret	13	10	9	11			13	24	11	18	14	13	111
14	(Japan) Tomita	Honda	21	17	15	15	21	15	29	11	Ret	DNS	DNQ	Ret	15	14	Ret	17	19	13	10	9	15	11	17	12	111
15	(United States) Lamay	Honda	16	18	13	17	15	Ret	21	13	13	20	Ret	Ret	16	16	19	14	18	Ret	20	12	17	12	15	15	100
16	(United States) Merriam	Yamaha	13	15	9	Ret	9	10	DNQ	DNQ	12	17	14	23			25	DNS	22	23	15	Ret	12	10	Ret	Ret	95
17	(United States) Anderson	Husqvarna	4	6	4	2																	4	DNS	19	DNS	91
18	(United States) Scharer	Yamaha	18	21	14	13	14	9	19	14	15	15	Ret	Ret	17	15	Ret	Ret	28	14	32	20	16	16	Ret	Ret	86
19	(Venezuela) Locurcio	Honda					10	14	17	16	Ret	Ret	7	7	Ret	DNS	13	13	Ret	Ret					26	21	71
20	(United States) Masterpool	Yamaha	14	14			11	13			19	16	13	Ret	Ret	DNS	16	20					13	17	Ret	29	65
21	(United States) Leith	Kawasaki	17	20	Ret	DNS	16	18	14	20	Ret	18	16	10	18	32	34	Ret	20	17							48
22	(United States) Ray	Yamaha			19	12	12	Ret	11	15	18	13			23	DNS			27	Ret							47
23	(United States) Autenrieth	KTM	19	22	20	14	13	12	13	24	21	14	Ret	17	DNQ	DNQ											46
24	(United States) Gaines	Yamaha							12	19	17	Ret	23	14	Ret	DNS	18	19			14	Ret			Ret	14	41
25	(United States) Chisholm	Yamaha	12	11	11	11	Ret	DNS	DNQ	DNQ																	39
26	(United States) Taft	Husqvarna	11	10	12	18																					33
27	(United States) Bogle	Suzuki											18	20	24	18	14	12	13	Ret							31
28	(Australia) Reed	Suzuki																							5	8	29
29	(Canada) Medaglia	Kawasaki																							7	6	29
30	(United States) DeMartile	Honda	20	19	21	16	20	23	15	18	26	21	19	18	Ret	19	32	28	23	26	21	Ret	20	19	DNQ	DNQ	28
31	(United States) Craig	Honda	8	8	Ret	DNS																					26
32	(United States) Canning	KTM									23	24	11	15							18	15					25
33	(United States) Crown	KTM											29	12			17	15							20	16	25
34	(France) Teillet	Husqvarna																							8	10	24
35	(United States) Short	Yamaha													DNQ	DNQ	22	18	14	18	Ret	Ret	21	14	24	17	24
36	(United States) Hand	Honda							27	28	22	25			19	24	30	32			11	13			23	18	23
37	(United States) Harrison	Honda							22	Ret	14	32	15	DNS	12	28	23	Ret									22
38	(United Kingdom) Nicholls	Honda													9	13											20
39	(United States) Bowers	Kawasaki																	15	9							18
40	(United States) Russell	KTM																			6	Ret					15
41	(United States) Hayes	Kawasaki									16	12															14
42	(United States) Grant	Kawasaki																	10	DNS							11
43	(United States) McConahy	Yamaha					DNS	DNS											16	15							11
44	(United States) Teasdale	Honda																					36	26	13	Ret	8
45	(United States) Surratt	KTM					25	24											24	16	DNQ	18	23	21	27	26	8
46	(Mexico) López Guttiérez	KTM			23	19	22	17			DNQ	23	28	27			20	23									7
47	(United States) Steinke	KTM	35	Ret	31	28	DNQ	DNQ	Ret	Ret	32	Ret					DNQ	DNQ	31	Ret	Ret	16	Ret	22			5
48	(South Africa) Lionnet	Honda	26	24	17	23	24	20															29	27	DNQ	30	5
49	(United States) Dowd	KTM											17	21							Ret	DNS					4
50	(United States) C. Williams	Honda							Ret	22	24	22			33	17											4
51	(United States) Runkles	KTM					29	29	24	27	35	30	27	30	26	26	35	30			Ret	17	25	28	Ret	24	4
52	(United States) Stepek	Kawasaki							26	31	33	Ret									17	Ret	27	Ret			4
53	(United States) D. Anderson	Honda					18	21							DNQ	DNQ											3
54	(United States) Piazza	Honda	30	Ret	28	25	33	26	18	30	25	28	22	Ret			28	27	35	24	DNQ	DNQ	22	25	22	31	3
55	(United States) Alldredge	KTM	22	Ret	18	Ret	Ret	DNS											Ret	Ret							3
56	(United States) Osby	KTM																							18	23	3
57	(United States) Schock	Yamaha							25	21			35	22	DNQ	DNQ					22	Ret	19	20			3
58	(United States) Marquier	Husqvarna					Ret	19			31	26			DNQ	20	29	33									3
59	(United States) Z. Williams	KTM									DNQ	DNQ			21	22	24	21			DNQ	19			25	22	2
60	(United States) Brown	Honda																	21	19							2
61	(United States) LaPorte	Honda	DNQ	DNQ	27	Ret	27	Ret	23	32	27	27	31	28	DNQ	25	31	31	25	21	23	Ret	30	Ret	Ret	19	2
62	(United States) Je. Smith	Honda							Ret	25	36	31	25	19	34	Ret											2
63	(United States) Fratz-Orr	KTM							28	26	DNQ	DNQ	34	31	30	29	DNQ	DNQ			19	Ret	31	30	Ret	27	2
64	(United States) Papi	Honda							Ret	23	29	Ret			20	31					25	DNS	32	29	Ret	28	1
65	(United States) Walton	Husqvarna	25	25	DNQ	DNQ													29	20							1
66	(United States) Marshall	KTM											20	26													1
67	(United States) Pipes	Suzuki	Ret	29	26	20																					1
	(United States) Tickle	KTM	Ret	30	32	21	Ret	Ret	30	29	28	29	DNQ	DNQ	31	Ret	33	29	32	25	24	Ret	26	24	Ret	Ret	0
	(United States) Albright	KTM											26	24							27	21	Ret	DNS			0
	(United States) Backaus	Yamaha													29	34	37	34							21	25	0
	(United States) Sewell	Kawasaki													28	21	36	26									0
	(United States) Robin	Honda									Ret	Ret					21	Ret									0
	(United States) Gardner	Honda													22	Ret	27	22									0
	(United States) Kouba	KTM	28	27			26	22											DNQ	DNQ							0
	(United States) Raper	Kawasaki	Ret	Ret	29	22	32	28											DNQ	DNQ							0
	(United States) A. Enticknap	Honda																	33	22							0
	(United States) Babbitt	KTM																			Ret	22					0
	(United States) Mosiman	Husqvarna	23	23	DNS	DNS																					0
	(United States) Lesher	Suzuki													DNQ	DNQ	26	25			Ret	Ret	24	23	28	Ret	0
	(United States) Kessler	Honda													DNQ	DNQ					29	23	34	33			0
	(United States) Schmidt	Suzuki					23	Ret											Ret	DNS							0
	(United States) Lane	KTM									DNQ	DNQ	24	25	25	27											0
	(United States) Hubert	Husqvarna	24	28	25	Ret									32	33	DNQ	DNQ	26	30							0
	(United States) Howell	Husqvarna	29	31	33	24	28	27											34	Ret							0
	(Guam) Lipanovich	KTM	27	Ret	24	Ret																					0
	(United States) Gilliam	KTM					DNQ	DNQ	DNQ	DNQ	DNQ	DNQ	DNQ	DNQ	DNQ	DNQ					DNQ	25	DNQ	DNQ			0
	(United States) Fitch Jr.	Honda					31	25																			0
	(United States) T. Enticknap	Honda																	DNQ	DNQ	31	26	33	31	Ret	Ret	0
	(United States) Ballard	Yamaha	32	26																							0
	(Denmark) Falden	Honda	33	32	34	26																					0
	(United States) Kirchmeyer	KTM											DNQ	DNQ							26	Ret			DNQ	DNQ	0
	(United States) Kraeger	Honda																			DNQ	27					0
	(United States) Burger	Honda																	DNQ	27							0
	(United States) Brough	Honda	DNQ	DNQ	35	27	DNQ	DNQ	33	34	DNQ	DNQ	DNQ	DNQ	DNQ	DNQ	DNQ	DNQ	DNQ	DNQ							0
	(United States) Lorenz III	Husqvarna							DNQ	DNQ					27	35									DNQ	DNQ	0
	(United States) R. Peters	Yamaha													DNQ	DNQ	DNQ	DNQ	DNQ	28							0
	(United States) Neese	Yamaha																			30	DNS	28	Ret	DNQ	DNQ	0
	(United States) Ja. Smith	Yamaha	DNQ	DNQ	DNQ	29	DNQ	DNQ	DNQ	DNQ	DNQ	DNQ	DNQ	DNQ					DNQ	DNQ							0
	(United States) Harriman	KTM	DNQ	DNQ	DNQ	DNQ													DNQ	29							0
	(United States) Murdoch	Husqvarna											30	29	DNQ	DNQ							DNQ	DNQ			0
	(United States) Esper	Suzuki							Ret	Ret											Ret	Ret	35	Ret	29	Ret	0
	(United States) Impens	Honda					30	30	Ret	DNS											DNS	DNS					0
	(United States) Gores	KTM	34	Ret	30	30																					0
	(United States) Prebula	KTM							DNQ	DNQ	DNQ	DNQ	DNQ	DNQ	35	30	DNQ	DNQ			DNQ	DNQ	DNQ	DNQ	DNQ	DNQ	0
	(United States) Jurin	Kawasaki																	30	Ret							0
	(United States) Bitterman	Honda									30	Ret															0
	(United States) Blackburn	Honda							31	33	DNQ	DNQ	DNQ	Ret					36	31							0
	(United States) Shondeck	Honda					34	31																			0
	(United States) Rubacalva	Honda	DNQ	DNQ	36	31					DNQ	DNQ															0
	(United States) Swan	Kawasaki	31	Ret	DNQ	DNQ													DNQ	DNQ							0
	(United States) Grondahl	Husqvarna											32	32													0
	(United States) N. Peterson	Honda	DNQ	DNQ	DNQ	32	DNQ	DNQ			DNQ	DNQ	DNQ	DNQ	DNQ	DNQ	DNQ	DNQ									0
	(United States) Sorensen	Suzuki					DNQ	32																			0
	(United States) C. Olson	Yamaha					DNQ	DNQ															DNQ	32			0
	(United States) Tomasunas	Yamaha							32	35	DNQ	DNQ															0
	(United States) Skodras	Honda					DNQ	33							DNQ	DNQ	DNQ	DNQ			DNQ	DNQ					0
	(United States) Burkeen	Yamaha									34	33			DNQ	DNQ											0
	(Italy) Gobbi	Kawasaki	36	33	DNQ	DNQ																					0
	(United States) Citrola	Honda			37	33	DNQ	DNQ											DNQ	DNQ							0
	(United States) Lampi	KTM											33	Ret													0
	(United States) Endriss	Yamaha							DNQ	DNQ			DNQ	DNQ							DNQ	DNQ	DNQ	34			0
	(United States) Norris	Honda					35	34																			0
	(United States) Rouse	Honda	DNQ	DNQ	Ret	Ret	DNQ	DNQ			DNQ	DNQ	DNQ	DNQ	DNQ	DNQ	DNQ	DNQ	DNQ	DNQ	DNQ	DNQ					0
	(United States) Prager	KTM							34	Ret	DNQ	DNQ			DNQ	DNQ					DNQ	DNQ	DNQ	DNQ			0
	(United States) Loberg	Husqvarna															38	35							DNQ	DNQ	0
	(United States) Coons	Yamaha					DNQ	DNQ	DNQ	36					DNQ	DNQ	DNQ	DNQ									0
	(United States) Clark	Kawasaki																					37	Ret			0
	(United States) Culbreth	Yamaha							DNQ	DNQ	DNQ	DNQ	DNQ	DNQ									DNQ	Ret			0
	(United States) Redman	Kawasaki					Ret	DNS																			0
	(United States) Politelli	Honda																	Ret	DNS							0
	(United States) Makuta	Honda	DNQ	DNQ	DNQ	DNQ	DNQ	DNQ	DNQ	DNQ	DNQ	DNQ	DNQ	DNQ	DNQ	DNQ	DNQ	DNQ	DNQ	DNQ	DNQ	DNQ	DNQ	DNQ	DNQ	DNQ	0
	(United States) Testa	Yamaha							DNQ	DNQ	DNQ	DNQ	DNQ	DNQ	DNQ	DNQ					DNQ	DNQ	DNQ	DNQ	DNQ	DNQ	0
	(United States) Lave	Husqvarna							DNQ	DNQ	DNQ	DNQ					DNQ	DNQ	DNQ	DNQ	DNQ	DNQ	DNQ	DNQ	DNQ	DNQ	0
	(United States) Akaydin	Honda					DNQ	DNQ	DNQ	DNQ	DNQ	DNQ			DNQ	DNQ	DNQ	DNQ							DNQ	DNQ	0
	(United States) Heintz	Kawasaki							DNQ	DNQ	DNQ	DNQ			DNQ	DNQ					DNQ	DNQ	DNQ	DNQ	DNQ	DNQ	0
	(United States) S. Thomas	Kawasaki							DNQ	DNQ	DNQ	DNQ	DNQ	DNQ							DNQ	DNQ	DNQ	DNQ			0
	(United States) Woodrow	Honda							DNQ	DNQ	DNQ	DNQ	DNQ	DNQ							DNQ	DNQ	DNQ	DNQ			0
	(United States) Troyer	Suzuki							DNQ	DNQ	DNQ	DNQ			DNQ	DNQ	DNQ	DNQ							DNQ	DNQ	0
	(United States) J. Cooper	Yamaha							DNQ	DNQ	DNQ	DNQ			DNQ	DNQ	DNQ	DNQ							DNQ	DNQ	0
	(United States) Scouten	KTM							DNQ	DNQ	DNQ	DNQ			DNQ	DNQ					DNQ	DNQ	DNQ	DNQ			0
	(United States) Weaver	Yamaha							DNQ	DNQ	DNQ	DNQ									DNQ	DNQ	DNQ	DNQ	DNQ	DNQ	0
	(United States) Dowell	Yamaha									DNQ	DNQ	DNQ	DNQ							DNQ	DNQ	DNQ	DNQ	DNQ	DNQ	0
	(United States) Maley	Yamaha					DNQ	DNQ	DNQ	DNQ	DNQ	DNQ					DNQ	DNQ									0
	(United States) Kerr	KTM							DNQ	DNQ	DNQ	DNQ	DNQ	DNQ			DNQ	DNQ									0
	(United States) Snow	Honda							DNQ	DNQ	DNQ	DNQ			DNQ	DNQ									DNQ	DNQ	0
	(United States) Houser	Honda							DNQ	DNQ	DNQ	DNQ									DNQ	DNQ	DNQ	DNQ			0
	(United States) Greenawalt	Yamaha							DNQ	DNQ	DNQ	DNQ											DNQ	DNQ	DNQ	DNQ	0
	(United States) Demastry	Yamaha							DNQ	DNQ					DNQ	DNQ					DNQ	DNQ	DNQ	DNQ			0
	(United States) Bugbee	Yamaha							DNQ	DNQ			DNQ	DNQ							DNQ	DNQ	DNQ	DNQ			0
	(United States) Braun	Honda							DNQ	DNQ							DNQ	DNQ			DNQ	DNQ			DNQ	DNQ	0
	(United States) Crutcher	KTM									DNQ	DNQ	DNQ	DNQ	DNQ	DNQ	DNQ	DNQ									0
	(United States) Gerrior	Suzuki	DNQ	DNQ			DNQ	DNQ											DNQ	DNQ							0
	(United States) D. Thomas	Yamaha	DNQ	DNQ			DNQ	DNQ											DNQ	DNQ							0
	(United States) Gebken	Honda					DNQ	DNQ	DNQ	DNQ	DNQ	DNQ															0
	(United States) Bock	Yamaha							DNQ	DNQ	DNQ	DNQ	DNQ	DNQ													0
	(United States) DeNeen	Honda							DNQ	DNQ	DNQ	DNQ											DNQ	DNQ			0
	(United States) Schudel	Honda									DNQ	DNQ	DNQ	DNQ	DNQ	DNQ											0
	(United States) Bidus	Yamaha									DNQ	DNQ	DNQ	DNQ	DNQ	DNQ											0
	(United States) Fletchall	Honda									DNQ	DNQ			DNQ	DNQ	DNQ	DNQ									0
	(Colombia) Jaramillo	Honda											DNQ	DNQ	DNQ	DNQ							DNQ	DNQ			0
	(United States) MacIntyre	Suzuki											DNQ	DNQ							DNQ	DNQ	DNQ	DNQ			0
	(United States) Uebrick	Yamaha											DNQ	DNQ							DNQ	DNQ	DNQ	DNQ			0
	(United States) Tomaszek	Honda											DNQ	DNQ							DNQ	DNQ			DNQ	DNQ	0
	(United States) Hanninen	KTM													DNQ	DNQ	DNQ	DNQ							DNQ	DNQ	0
	(United States) Maus	KTM													DNQ	DNQ	DNQ	DNQ							DNQ	DNQ	0
	(United States) Grgurich	Yamaha													DNQ	DNQ	DNQ	DNQ							DNQ	DNQ	0
	(United States) Ward	KTM																	DNQ	DNQ			DNQ	DNQ	DNQ	DNQ	0
	(United States) Peneno	Yamaha																			DNQ	DNQ	DNQ	DNQ	DNQ	DNQ	0
	(United States) Johnston	Yamaha	DNQ	DNQ	DNQ	DNQ																					0
	(United States) Cicero	Kawasaki	DNQ	DNQ	DNQ	DNQ																					0
	(United States) Bunch	Yamaha	DNQ	DNQ	DNQ	DNQ																					0
	(United States) Foedish III	Husqvarna	DNQ	DNQ			DNQ	DNQ																			0
	(United States) Knight	Yamaha	DNQ	DNQ															DNQ	DNQ							0
	(United States) Stralo	Kawasaki			DNQ	DNQ	DNQ	DNQ																			0
	(United States) F. Smith	Honda					DNQ	DNQ			DNQ	DNQ															0
	(United States) Prier	Honda					DNQ	DNQ							DNQ	DNQ											0
	(United States) Richards	Suzuki					DNQ	DNQ											DNQ	DNQ							0
	(United States) Fortner	Honda					DNQ	DNQ											DNQ	DNQ							0
	(United States) Dillon	KTM					DNQ	DNQ											DNQ	DNQ							0
	(United States) Bachman	Honda							DNQ	DNQ					DNQ	DNQ											0
	(United States) Titus	KTM									DNQ	DNQ													DNQ	DNQ	0
	(United States) Tolman-Moschetti	Suzuki											DNQ	DNQ							DNQ	DNQ					0
	(United States) Sánchez	Honda											DNQ	DNQ							DNQ	DNQ					0
	(United States) Costa	Yamaha											DNQ	DNQ							DNQ	DNQ					0
	(United States) Rossi	Yamaha											DNQ	DNQ							DNQ	DNQ					0
	(United States) Price	Suzuki											DNQ	DNQ									DNQ	DNQ			0
	(United States) L. Peters	Yamaha													DNQ	DNQ	DNQ	DNQ									0
	(Ecuador) Benenaula	Kawasaki													DNQ	DNQ	DNQ	DNQ									0
	(United States) Nagy	KTM													DNQ	DNQ	DNQ	DNQ									0
	(United States) Newman	Yamaha													DNQ	DNQ	DNQ	DNQ									0
	(United States) Thompson	Yamaha													DNQ	DNQ									DNQ	DNQ	0
	(United States) Green	Yamaha													DNQ	DNQ									DNQ	DNQ	0
	(United States) Klippel	Honda													DNQ	DNQ									DNQ	DNQ	0
	(United States) Siler	Yamaha													DNQ	DNQ									DNQ	DNQ	0
	(United States) Emory IV	Yamaha															DNQ	DNQ			DNQ	DNQ					0
	(United States) T. Myers	KTM															DNQ	DNQ							DNQ	DNQ	0
	(United States) Sheridan	KTM																			DNQ	DNQ	DNQ	DNQ			0
	(United States) Randanella	Honda																			DNQ	DNQ	DNQ	DNQ			0
	(United States) Diezic	KTM																			DNQ	DNQ	DNQ	DNQ			0
	(United States) Venarchick	KTM																					DNQ	DNQ	DNQ	DNQ	0
	(United States) Hess	KTM																					DNQ	DNQ	DNQ	DNQ	0
	(Argentina) Fernández	Honda	DNQ	DNQ																							0
	(United States) Bannister	Kawasaki					DNQ	DNQ																			0
	(United States) Gifford	Kawasaki					DNQ	DNQ																			0
	(United States) Player	KTM					DNQ	DNQ																			0
	(United States) J. Olson	Honda					DNQ	DNQ																			0
	(United States) Stewart	Yamaha					DNQ	DNQ																			0
	(United States) Lee	Honda					DNQ	DNQ																			0
	(United States) Bright	Honda							DNQ	DNQ																	0
	(United States) Hall	Husqvarna							DNQ	DNQ																	0
	(United States) O'Dell	Suzuki							DNQ	DNQ																	0
	(United States) B. Peterson	Honda									DNQ	DNQ															0
	(United States) Ashburn	KTM									DNQ	DNQ															0
	(United States) Shaw	Husqvarna									DNQ	DNQ															0
	(United States) Ashe	Husqvarna									DNQ	DNQ															0
	(United States) Snyder	Yamaha									DNQ	DNQ															0
	(United States) Cantrell	Yamaha									DNQ	DNQ															0
	(United States) Tiso	Kawasaki											DNQ	DNQ													0
	(United States) Mayzak	Honda											DNQ	DNQ													0
	(United States) Higley	KTM											DNQ	DNQ													0
	(United States) Kelleher	Honda											DNQ	DNQ													0
	(United States) Desjardins	KTM											DNQ	DNQ													0
	(United States) Johnson	Honda											DNQ	DNQ													0
	(United States) Morrison	Kawasaki											DNQ	DNQ													0
	(United States) Pagano	KTM											DNQ	DNQ													0
	(United States) Czarnota	KTM											DNQ	DNQ													0
	(United States) Healy	KTM											DNQ	DNQ													0
	(United States) Walker	Honda											DNQ	DNQ													0
	(United States) Williams	KTM											DNQ	DNQ													0
	(United States) Manni	KTM											DNQ	DNQ													0
	(United States) Giambrone	Suzuki											DNQ	DNQ													0
	(United States) Buffis	Honda											DNQ	DNQ													0
	(United States) Montreuil	KTM													DNQ	DNQ											0
	(United States) Sessink	Honda													DNQ	DNQ											0
	(United States) Perron	Kawasaki															DNQ	DNQ									0
	(United States) Barr	Yamaha															DNQ	DNQ									0
	(United States) Vanbuskirk	KTM															DNQ	DNQ									0
	(Germany) Haase	Suzuki															DNQ	DNQ									0
	(United States) Jackson	Kawasaki															DNQ	DNQ									0
	(United States) Johnson	Yamaha															DNQ	DNQ									0
	(United States) B. Myers	KTM															DNQ	DNQ									0
	(United States) Hameister	Husqvarna															DNQ	DNQ									0
	(United States) Slark	Honda															DNQ	DNQ									0
	(United States) Reinhart	KTM															DNQ	DNQ									0
	(United States) Raskovich	Yamaha															DNQ	DNQ									0
	(United States) Allen	Honda															DNQ	DNQ									0
	(United States) Henshaw	Honda															DNQ	DNQ									0
	(United States) Heckendorf	Honda															DNQ	DNQ									0
	(United States) Sullivan	Kawasaki																	DNQ	DNQ							0
	(United States) Rookstool	Honda																	DNQ	DNQ							0
	(United States) James	Honda																	DNQ	DNQ							0
	(United States) McBride	KTM																	DNQ	DNQ							0
	(United States) Ludwigsen	Kawasaki																	DNQ	DNQ							0
	(United States) Ridel	Husqvarna																			DNQ	DNQ					0
	(United States) Coen	Honda																			DNQ	DNQ					0
	(United States) Burnett	Honda																			DNQ	DNQ					0
	(United States) Nelko	Honda																			DNQ	DNQ					0
	(United States) Tait	Yamaha																			DNQ	DNQ					0
	(United States) T. Hayes	Suzuki																			DNQ	DNQ					0
	(United States) Tovani	KTM																			DNQ	DNQ					0
	(United States) Moore	KTM																			DNQ	DNQ					0
	(United States) France	KTM																					DNQ	DNQ			0
	(United States) Hougentogler	Honda																					DNQ	DNQ			0
	(United States) G. Smith	Honda																					DNQ	DNQ			0
	(United States) Rose	Kawasaki																					DNQ	DNQ			0
	(United States) Chambers	Kawasaki																					DNQ	DNQ			0
	(United States) McKay	Yamaha																					DNQ	DNQ			0
	(United States) Callahan	Kawasaki																					DNQ	DNQ			0
	(United States) A. Walker	Kawasaki																					DNQ	DNQ			0
	(United States) Swett	Yamaha																					DNQ	DNQ			0
	(United States) B. Albright	Yamaha																					DNQ	DNQ			0
	(United States) VanBeek	Suzuki																					DNQ	DNQ			0
	(Canada) Jeffery	KTM																							DNQ	DNQ	0
	(United States) Barbaree	Kawasaki																							DNQ	DNQ	0
	(Canada) Goheen	Yamaha																							DNQ	DNQ	0
	(United States) Discher	KTM																							DNQ	DNQ	0
Pos	Rider	Bike	HAN (California)		GLN (California)		THU (Colorado)		HIG (Pennsylvania)		TEN (Tennessee)		SOU (Massachusetts)		RED (Michigan)		SPR (Minnesota)		WAS (Washington (state))		UNA (New York (state))		BUD (Maryland)		IRN (Indiana)		Points

== 250cc ==
=== Entry list ===
Team	Constructor	No	Rider	Rounds
Rockstar Energy Husqvarna	Husqvarna	1	(United States) Zach Osborne	1–3
Rockstar Energy Husqvarna	Husqvarna	30	(United States) Mitchell Harrison	4–12
Rockstar Energy Husqvarna	Husqvarna	64	(United States) Michael Mosiman	All
Rockstar Energy Husqvarna	Husqvarna	133	(United States) Jordan Bailey	All
GEICO Honda	Honda	6	(United States) Jeremy Martin	1–5
GEICO Honda	Honda	36	(United States) RJ Hampshire	All
GEICO Honda	Honda	40	(United States) Chase Sexton	All
GEICO Honda	Honda	66	(United States) Cameron McAdoo	4–12
Monster Energy Pro Circuit Kawasaki	Kawasaki	17	(United States) Joey Savatgy	All
Monster Energy Pro Circuit Kawasaki	Kawasaki	35	(United States) Austin Forkner	All
Monster Energy Pro Circuit Kawasaki	Kawasaki	182	(United States) Garrett Marchbanks	1–4, 7
Star Racing Yamaha	Yamaha	23	(United States) Aaron Plessinger	All
Star Racing Yamaha	Yamaha	24	(France) Dylan Ferrandis	4–12
Star Racing Yamaha	Yamaha	31	(United States) Colt Nichols	5–12
Star Racing Yamaha	Yamaha	62	(United States) Justin Cooper	All
TLD Red Bull KTM	KTM	26	(United States) Alex Martin	All
TLD Red Bull KTM	KTM	28	(United States) Shane McElrath	All
TLD Red Bull KTM	KTM	43	(United States) Sean Cantrell	All
TLD Red Bull KTM	KTM	45	(United States) Jordon Smith	All
TLD Red Bull KTM	KTM	123	(United States) Mitchell Falk	11–12
Traders Racing	Yamaha	38	(United States) Luke Renzland	4–6, 10–11
Rocky Mountain ATV/MC	KTM	42	(United States) Dakota Alix	1–2, 6–12
Autotrader JGR Suzuki	Suzuki	46	(United States) Justin Hill	1–3
Autotrader JGR Suzuki	Suzuki	47	(United States) James Decotis	5–9, 11–12
Autotrader JGR Suzuki	Suzuki	816	(Brazil) Enzo Lopes	1–4, 8–12
51FIFTY Energy Drink	Yamaha	63	(Australia) Hayden Mellross	1, 5–12
Nut Up C4MX	KTM	77	(United States) Ryan Surratt	1–2
Latitude Graphics/BWR Engines Racing	Honda	82	(United States) Cody Williams	1–3, 8, 10–12
FCC Motorsports	Honda	89	(United States) Jerry Robin	4
Coastal Racing Rockstar Energy Husqvarna	Husqvarna	98	(United States) Ryan Sipes	5, 7, 11–12
3D Racing	Yamaha	101	(Japan) Yusuke Watanabe	1–4, 8–12
3D Racing	Yamaha	169	(United States) Challen Tennant	All
Cycle Trader Rock River Yamaha	Yamaha	114	(United States) Brandon Hartranft	1–5
BC Granite and Marble	Yamaha	127	(United States) Jacob Bork	2
JMC Motorsports	Husqvarna	130	(United States) Austin Root	All
Sportland 2	Honda	136	(United States) Joshua Philbrick	5, 8, 10, 12
IBCorp Racing	Yamaha	137	(Ecuador) Martin Castelo	1–3, 9–11
Fletchall Racing	Yamaha	142	(United States) Collin Fletchall	12
	Yamaha	153	(United States) Carson Carr	1–3, 9
North County Yamaha	Yamaha	154	(United States) Chase Felong	1–3, 5, 7–9
	Kawasaki	155	(United States) Drayke Sizemore	5, 7, 12
	Yamaha	162	(United States) Maxwell Sanford	10–12
	Honda	164	(United States) Matthew Klann	4, 6–7
Highland Trails Racing	KTM	168	(United States) Cale Kuchnicki	4–7, 10–12
Solid Performance KTM	KTM	175	(United States) Anthony Maladra	11
Motorsports International bLU cRU	Yamaha	183	(United States) Jake Larsen	6
Monks Construction Racing	KTM	186	(United States) Tyler Monks	3, 8
	KTM	187	(United States) Walter White	6
Grindstone Compound	KTM	188	(United States) Gage Schehr	1–3, 5–7, 10–12
Hempen Racing	Yamaha	202	(United States) Luke Hempen	8, 11–12
3Seventeen Moto	Honda	208	(United States) Brandon Hugney	4, 7, 11
MX University	Yamaha	212	(Australia) Tyler McCoy	1–3, 7–8
Team Allsouth	Honda	214	(United States) Vann Martin	1–8, 10–12
	Kawasaki	219	(United States) Lukas Cobian	8, 12
Adventure Powersports	Kawasaki	220	(United States) Travis Hardcastle	5, 7, 12
EBR Performance	Yamaha	222	(Brazil) Ramyller Alves	1–7, 10–11
	Yamaha	223	(United States) Jamison DuClos	7–8, 10, 12
RMXSeries.com	Honda	234	(United States) McCoy Brough	1–9
Freedom Cycle Suzuki	Suzuki	238	(United States) Benjamin Robinson	6, 10
	KTM	241	(United States) TJ Albright	4–5, 7
Valley Motorsports	Honda	242	(United States) Shawn MacDonald	5–6, 10
Championship Powersports	Honda	243	(United States) Hunter Braun	7
Fusion Graphix	KTM	246	(United States) Chance Blackburn	1–3
Safeguard Security	Yamaha	248	(United States) Travis Delnicki	6
Slo Joe Racing	KTM	257	(United States) Joey DeNeen	7
	Yamaha	258	(United States) Justin Rodbell	11–12
World of Powersports	Kawasaki	288	(United States) Parker Smith	4–5, 7
Zeigler Motorsports	KTM	290	(United States) Denver Rigsby	7, 11
Mason Agency	Kawasaki	294	(United States) Nicholas McDonnell	4–6, 10–11
Maxim Yamaha	Yamaha	296	(United States) Ryder Floyd	3, 5, 8–12
Snyder Racing	KTM	299	(United States) Tucker Snyder	4
Harford Air Services	KTM	302	(United States) Nick Hess	10
Hand Racing	Yamaha	303	(United States) Michael Hand	4–5, 7, 9–12
Hand Racing	Honda	332	(United States) Jeremy Hand	11
	Kawasaki	307	(United States) Cameron Fasnacht	4–5
Diamond Motorsports	Yamaha	319	(United States) Coty Schock	12
Team Weeck	Honda	331	(United States) Tommy Weeck	9
Team MBR	KTM	334	(United States) Christopher Lauro	6
Braden Racing	Kawasaki	336	(United States) Chaz Braden	8, 12
Next Gear Race Programs	KTM	340	(United States) Blake Taylor	11–12
CKdesignz Racing	Honda	342	(United States) Colton Karl	6, 8
Custom MX Supply	Yamaha	345	(United States) Joshua Prior	5–7, 10–11
Plumbing Plus	KTM	346	(United States) Kevin Moranz	1–5, 7–8, 10–12
	KTM	367	(United States) Hunter Sayles	8, 10, 12
	KTM	368	(United States) Stephen Czarnota	7, 11
SOBMX	KTM	369	(United States) Jason Astudillo	7, 10–11
Peterson Racing	Honda	399	(United States) Broc Peterson	7
Cooperstown Sand and Gravel	Honda	407	(United States) Benjamin Nelko	4–6, 11
Southeast Sales	KTM	410	(United States) Tyler Lowe	3–5, 7
	Yamaha	418	(United States) Renton Minuto	2
Kessler Pro Suspension	Honda	420	(United States) Christopher Duymich	10–11
Kessler Pro Suspension	Honda	449	(United States) Dakota Kessler	6
Ferrotherm Racing Team	Husqvarna	422	(Germany) Philip Klakow	2
Xtreme Powersports	Honda	425	(United States) Joshua Leininger	4–5, 7, 11–12
Prior Racing	Yamaha	426	(United States) Matthew Fisk	5–6
Grindstone Compound	Yamaha	427	(United States) Deegan Vonlossberg	1–3, 5–12
JMC Racing	Husqvarna	430	(United States) Dylan Summerlin	1–4
SRS Suspension	Yamaha	440	(United States) John Weaver	4–5, 7, 12
TPJ/Fly Racing	Honda	446	(United States) Blaine Silveira	1–3, 9
TPJ/Fly Racing	Yamaha	700	(United States) James Weeks	All
TPJ/Fly Racing	Kawasaki	767	(United States) Mason Wharton	All
	KTM	458	(United States) Michael Sweeney	3
Team Justice MX Racing	Kawasaki	459	(United States) Austin Brooks	6–7, 11
Texas Boys Motocross Unlimited	KTM	470	(United States) Kyle Hopkins	3, 5–7
Team Super Toolbags	KTM	481	(United States) Johnathan Wells	4
Bristol Racing	KTM	485	(United States) Andrew Bristol	10
FiveStar Powersports	KTM	490	(United States) Kein Denzler	7
	KTM	491	(United States) Gabe Gutierres	4–6, 10
	Husqvarna	492	(United States) Luc Santos	2–3, 9
Prime Time Designs Racing	Kawasaki	498	(United States) Jason Dragonetti	11
	Yamaha	500	(United States) Ben Adamson	8
Canvas MX	Yamaha	507	(United States) Nicholas Tomasunas	7, 11
Nagy Racing	Honda	509	(United States) Alexander Nagy	10, 12
	Honda	510	(United States) Travis Prier	8
Giles Racing	Honda	511	(United States) Charles Wernig	10–11
	Honda	514	(United States) Anthony Roth	2–4, 6, 8, 10
Conklin Cycle Center	Suzuki	515	(United States) James Doolittle	4–6, 10–11
	Yamaha	516	(South Africa) Justin Thompson	11–12
dPIII Apparel & Designs	Honda	520	(United States) Dennis Ponton III	7–8, 12
Zitterkopf Racing	Yamaha	522	(United States) Cole Zitterkopf	3, 12
	KTM	527	(United States) Matthew Hammer	6
Justice Racing	KTM	529	(United States) James Justice	12
Rob's Performance Motorsports	KTM	546	(United States) Tylor Skodras	12
Rob's Performance Motorsports	KTM	598	(United States) Mason Persha	3, 7–8, 10, 12
Rob's Performance Motorsports	KTM	606	(United States) Taylor Strauss	3, 7–8, 12
Motocutz	Yamaha	551	(United States) Tyler Rosa	1–3, 7, 9
Underground RC	KTM	561	(United States) Caleb Hall	10
	Kawasaki	566	(United States) Jacob Rose	4–5, 7
Woodstock KTM	KTM	570	(United States) Cody Vanbuskirk	7, 12
Rocket Valley Motorsports	KTM	574	(United States) Ryan Lechien	4–7
RS Racing	Husqvarna	583	(United States) Cory Ridel	4–6, 11
Okstorage.com Racing	Husqvarna	591	(United States) Tanner Myers	9
Litz Racing	Husqvarna	599	(United States) Benjamin Lee	5
Tom Zont Racing	Yamaha	622	(United States) Zac Maley	6–7, 9–10, 12
Cerric's Racing	Honda	624	(United States) Garrett Smith	4–5, 7
Dickson Racing	Honda	631	(United States) Brandon Dickson	4, 6–8, 12
	Kawasaki	661	(United States) Noah Chambers	10
G.I.E Inc.	Honda	668	(United States) Ryan Blanford	12
Black Diamond MX	Yamaha	674	(United States) Riley Kroone	7–8
Matthews Heating and Cooling	KTM	675	(United States) Kyle Dillin	4, 7, 10
DY Racing	Kawasaki	689	(United States) Tony Usko	7, 10–11
Team Gauge	Yamaha	699	(United States) Gauge Keith	11
Dreisbach Racing	Yamaha	710	(United States) Dominick Dreisbach	6, 10
Mikeys Motorsports	KTM	719	(United States) Joshua Berchem	1–8, 10–11
Fratz-Orr Racing	KTM	720	(United States) Derek Fratz-Orr	4, 7
Pro+ Motorsports	Yamaha	724	(United States) Jason McConnell	4–5, 7, 10–11
PR2 Racing	Suzuki	727	(United States) Bradley Esper	6
Sandy Crack Racing	Husqvarna	738	(United States) Kyle Hameister	12
Tri City Cycle	Yamaha	747	(United States) Cody Gray	3
Moto-Fresh	Honda	753	(United States) Derik Brewster	3
SeagoFireProtection	Kawasaki	755	(United States) Todd Smith	4
	Honda	763	(United States) James Henshaw	4, 6, 10
Itamarca Racing	Honda	791	(Brazil) Gustavo Souza	1–3
Leininger Brothers Racing	Honda	795	(United States) Aaron Leininger	4–5, 7, 11–12
Team Montro Racing	KTM	812	(Dominican Republic) Luijo Duran	4, 7, 10–11
Stansbury Tree Service	Yamaha	818	(United States) James Barry	4–7, 10–11
Oxborrow Racing	KTM	820	(United States) Dalton Oxborrow	9
TNT Appliances	KTM	821	(United States) Trevor Tate	5
	Kawasaki	824	(United States) Carter Stephenson	7–8, 12
MAD Racing	Honda	825	(United States) Zach Peddie	1
NPR 4 AUTISM	KTM	832	(United States) Brady Neys	5, 7, 12
Championship Powersports Racing	Honda	841	(United States) Jeffrey Walker	1–2, 4–5, 7–8, 12
Championship Powersports Racing	Honda	924	(United States) Greg Durivage	4
therightdirection.org	KTM	847	(United States) DJ Christie	4–5, 7–8, 11–12
	Kawasaki	851	(United States) Kaleb De Keyrel	8, 12
MB60 Action Sports	KTM	870	(United States) Colton Camp	4, 10–11
Roseville Yamaha	Yamaha	892	(United States) Garret Iopppolo	1–11
Magic Racing	Yamaha	904	(United States) Jarett Pesci	7
	Kawasaki	906	(United States) Adrian Galamba	7–8
Phoenix Racing	Honda	910	(United States) Carson Brown	4–5, 7
Enzo Racing	Honda	916	(United States) Jorge Rubacalva	7–8
Motorbikes Plus	KTM	919	(United States) Brian Borghesani	6, 10–11
Melon Design Co.	KTM	923	(United States) Chris Moore	6–7, 11
Porter Racing	Yamaha	927	(United States) Jamal Porter	4–6, 11
Pasha Racing	Yamaha	934	(United States) Brian Medeiros	1–3, 9
Netti Racing	Yamaha	947	(United States) Daniel Netti	6, 10
Excavating Associates	Yamaha	957	(United States) Jarrett Thompson	4–5
Munn Racing	Husqvarna	959	(United States) Josef DeBower	8
Tait Racing	Yamaha	962	(United States) Joseph Tait	11
Program Riders	KTM	971	(United States) Benjamin Brouillard	6, 10
Motorsport Hillsboro	Honda	974	(United States) Brian Marty	9
Buddy Brooks Racing	Honda	993	(United States) Austin Wagner	4–5, 7, 10–12

=== Riders Championship ===
Pos	Rider	Bike	HAN (California)		GLN (California)		THU (Colorado)		HIG (Pennsylvania)		TEN (Tennessee)		SOU (Massachusetts)		RED (Michigan)		SPR (Minnesota)		WAS (Washington (state))		UNA (New York (state))		BUD (Maryland)		IRN (Indiana)		Points
1	(United States) Plessinger	Yamaha	3	4	1	1	6	4	1	1	9	5	3	7	1	1	1	1	4	3	2	2	1	11	1	1	500
2	(United States) A. Martin	KTM	7	3	3	3	3	2	12	5	12	3	2	4	4	3	7	2	8	6	10	7	10	4	9	9	390
3	(United States) Cooper	Yamaha	5	9	4	7	1	8	3	4	2	28	17	9	8	7	4	3	6	8	12	6	14	3	3	7	352
4	(United States) Hampshire	Honda	10	7	8	9	13	7	7	7	4	19	7	3	2	DNS	6	11	10	4	9	11	2	1	4	3	337
5	(United States) McElrath	KTM	9	14	9	12	9	9	9	6	3	2	6	2	5	9	5	33	9	1	3	14	9	6	5	10	332
6	(United States) Sexton	Honda	11	5	10	8	10	6	10	Ret	8	4	5	14	11	6	8	5	5	10	5	8	7	2	2	6	324
7	(United States) Forkner	Kawasaki	4	Ret	13	6	7	3	4	2	5	9	1	20	Ret	2	2	18	2	Ret	23	9	3	7	7	5	314
8	(France) Ferrandis	Yamaha							8	3	11	1	4	1	3	4	11	8	11	2	1	1	5	10	10	4	310
9	(United States) Savatgy	Kawasaki	6	10	6	4	34	12	6	Ret	6	7	Ret	5	17	5	10	4	1	9	8	3	11	16	Ret	8	275
10	(United States) J. Smith	KTM	8	8	11	14	4	5	5	10	7	6	12	12	10	20	3	7	3	13	11	12	6	Ret	DNQ	DNQ	259
11	(United States) Mosiman	Husqvarna	15	11	18	18	16	10	13	9	14	10	10	11	9	11	18	6	7	12	6	13	8	9	6	11	233
12	(United States) Harrison	Husqvarna							14	14	15	11	15	6	13	8	12	10	12	7	4	4	4	5	DNQ	DNQ	185
13	(United States) Nichols	Yamaha									10	20	8	8	7	17	9	9	15	5	7	10	15	8	8	2	181
14	(United States) J. Martin	Honda	2	2	5	2	2	1	2	Ret	1	Ret															176
15	(United States) McAdoo	Honda							Ret	13	13	8	9	13	15	14	15	13	16	11	15	5	17	12	Ret	Ret	126
16	(United States) Bailey	Husqvarna	19	19	14	13	17	16	16	Ret	16	14	13	10	12	10	13	12	19	14	20	17	Ret	Ret	DNQ	12	124
17	(United States) Cantrell	KTM	17	16	12	15	11	17	15	12	18	16	11	15	Ret	DNS	14	14	13	17	19	20	12	Ret	DNQ	DNQ	115
18	(United States) Osborne	Husqvarna	1	1	2	5	5	20																			105
19	(United States) Marchbanks	Kawasaki	12	6	7	10	8	11	27	DNS					6	Ret											87
20	(Brazil) Lopes	Suzuki	13	15	19	21	12	14	20	Ret							17	19	14	15	14	DNS	13	13	DNQ	DNQ	75
21	(United States) Alix	KTM	18	17	15	Ret							14	19	14	12	19	16	17	19	17	19	19	19	DNQ	DNQ	61
22	(United States) Hartranft	Yamaha	14	12	35	16	18	Ret	11	8	20	13															56
23	(Australia) Mellross	Yamaha	Ret	DNS							22	15	16	16	18	15	33	15	Ret	20	16	18	16	15	DNQ	DNQ	51
24	(United States) Hill	Suzuki	16	13	17	11	15	13																			41
25	(United States) Tennant	Yamaha	21	Ret	Ret	19	21	18	21	16	19	17	18	18	20	16	20	20	Ret	18	29	25	Ret	18	DNQ	DNQ	36
26	(United States) DeCotis	Suzuki									17	12	20	Ret	27	24	16	24	18	21			34	14	DNQ	DNQ	29
27	(Ecuador) Castelo	Yamaha	20	Ret	16	17	14	15											21	Ret	18	Ret	29	Ret			26
28	(United States) Renzland	Yamaha							17	11	21	Ret	DNS	DNS							Ret	16	21	20			20
29	(Brazil) Alves	Yamaha	Ret	21	Ret	Ret	19	21	19	16	23	Ret	DNS	DNS	19	27					Ret	15	DNQ	DNQ			18
30	(United States) Weeks	Yamaha	32	32	28	24	28	28	29	21	27	18	19	17	31	22	37	22	22	22	13	34	26	22	DNQ	DNQ	17
31	(United States) Sayles	KTM															26	Ret			24	33			12	14	16
32	(United States) Sipes	Husqvarna									25	21			16	13							20	Ret	DNQ	DNQ	14
33	(United States) Root	Husqvarna	31	30	21	25	24	25	18	17	32	Ret	DNS	DNS	23	18	23	17	Ret	Ret	Ret	21	Ret	Ret	DNQ	DNQ	14
34	(United States) Rodbell	Yamaha																					33	31	17	13	12
35	(United States) Wagner	Honda							DNQ	29	DNQ	DNQ			DNQ	DNQ					DNQ	DNQ	DNQ	DNQ	15	15	12
36	(United States) Walker	Honda	36	34	32	32			33	23	38	Ret			30	Ret	31	28							11	Ret	10
37	(United States) Strauss	KTM					DNQ	DNQ							DNQ	DNQ	DNQ	DNQ							14	18	10
38	(United States) Maley	Yamaha											DNQ	DNQ	DNQ	DNQ			DNQ	DNQ	DNQ	DNQ			13	Ret	8
39	(United States) Falk	KTM																					18	17	DNS	DNS	7
40	(United States) Weeck	Honda																	20	16							6
41	(United States) Zitterkopf	Yamaha					DNQ	DNQ																	16	22	5
42	(United States) Skodras	KTM																							Ret	16	5
43	(Brazil) Souza	Honda	22	18	22	Ret	22	19																			5
44	(United States) Philbrick	Honda									DNQ	DNQ					35	37			DNQ	DNQ			Ret	17	4
45	(United States) V. Martin	Honda	27	22	30	28	27	Ret	24	18	29	23	23	24	Ret	Ret	DNQ	DNQ			30	29	31	26	DNQ	DNQ	3
46	(United States) Fletchall	Yamaha																							18	Ret	3
47	(United States) Moranz	KTM	25	29	29	29	30	24	25	20	28	22			22	19	25	23			26	24	28	25	DNQ	DNQ	3
48	(United States) Surratt	KTM	24	20	20	20																					3
49	(United States) Brown	Honda							23	19	26	DNS			25	21											2
50	(United States) Sanford	Yamaha																			33	27	DNQ	DNQ	Ret	19	2
51	(United States) Stephenson	Kawasaki													DNQ	DNQ	34	34							19	Ret	2
52	(United States) Schehr	KTM	23	33	26	27	20	34			24	25	Ret	DNS	Ret	Ret					Ret	22	22	Ret	DNQ	DNQ	1
53	(United States) Blanford	Honda																							24	20	1
54	(United States) Kuchnicki	KTM							DNQ	DNQ	DNQ	DNQ	DNQ	DNQ	DNQ	DNQ					DNQ	DNQ	DNQ	DNQ	20	24	1
	(Japan) Watanabe	Yamaha	30	26	25	22	23	23	22	Ret							21	26	Ret	23	21	23	24	23			0
	(United States) Williams	Honda	28	25	Ret	23	35	Ret									22	21			22	35	23	21	DNQ	DNQ	0
	(United States) Prior	Yamaha									DNQ	31	21	22	DNQ	DNQ					DNQ	DNQ	DNQ	DNQ			0
	(United States) Christie	KTM							DNQ	DNQ	DNQ	DNQ			DNQ	DNQ	DNQ	DNQ					DNQ	DNQ	21	26	0
	(United States) Taylor	KTM																					DNQ	DNQ	29	21	0
	(United States) Gutierres	KTM							Ret	DNS	DNQ	DNQ	Ret	21							Ret	DNS					0
	(United States) Vanbuskirk	KTM													21	DSQ									Ret	DNS	0
	(United States) Felong	Yamaha	26	23	23	DNS	32	22			30	24			28	Ret	Ret	29	DNQ	DNQ							0
	(United States) Albright	KTM							26	22	34	30			26	23											0
	(United States) Sizemore	Kawasaki									37	33			32	33									22	Ret	0
	(United States) Borghesani	KTM											22	Ret							31	30	DNQ	DNQ			0
	(United States) Vonlossberg	Yamaha	34	27	27	30	DNQ	DNQ			31	DNS	27	27	Ret	26	24	Ret	23	31	28	28	36	32	DNQ	DNQ	0
	(United States) Justice	KTM																							Ret	23	0
	(United States) Porter	Yamaha							DNQ	DNQ	36	27	Ret	23									32	28			0
	(United States) Hameister	Husqvarna																							23	Ret	0
	(United States) Rosa	Yamaha	29	24	24	26	26	26							Ret	29			26	24							0
	(United States) Brough	Honda	33	28	33	33	33	37	31	Ret	33	34	DNQ	26	24	25	28	27	25	25							0
	(United States) Hammer	KTM											24	25													0
	(United States) Floyd	Yamaha					DNQ	DNQ			35	Ret					30	30	24	29	Ret	Ret	25	27	DNQ	DNQ	0
	(United States) M. Hand	Yamaha							34	24	DNQ	DNQ			29	30			28	28	34	32	DNQ	DNQ	Ret	Ret	0
	(South Africa) Thompson	Yamaha																					30	24	DNQ	DNQ	0
	(United States) Nagy	Honda																			27	26			25	Ret	0
	(Australia) McCoy	Yamaha	DNQ	DNQ	34	31	25	30							DNQ	DNQ	27	Ret									0
	(United States) Braden	Kawasaki															DNQ	DNQ							Ret	25	0
	(United States) Hempen	Yamaha															29	25					35	29	DNQ	DNQ	0
	(United States) Netti	Yamaha											DNQ	DNQ							25	31					0
	(United States) Rose	Kawasaki							36	25	DNQ	DNQ			DNQ	DNQ											0
	(United States) Esper	Suzuki											25	Ret													0
	(United States) Lowe	KTM					Ret	27	32	28	Ret	26			Ret	28											0
	(United States) White	KTM											26	28													0
	(United States) Fasnacht	Kawasaki							35	26	DNQ	DNQ															0
	(United States) Marty	Honda																	36	26							0
	(United States) Wharton	Kawasaki	DNQ	DNQ	DNQ	DNQ	DNQ	DNQ	DNQ	DNQ	DNQ	DNQ	31	29	DNQ	DNQ	DNQ	DNQ	30	27	DNQ	DNQ	DNQ	DNQ	Ret	27	0
	(United States) Camp	KTM							DNQ	27											DNQ	DNQ	DNQ	DNQ			0
	(United States) J. Hand	Honda																					27	30			0
	(United States) Carr	Yamaha	37	31	31	34	Ret	DNS											27	30							0
	(United States) Nelko	Honda							28	DNS	DNQ	29											DNQ	DNQ			0
	(United States) Berchem	KTM	DNQ	DNQ	DNQ	DNQ	DNQ	DNQ	DNQ	DNQ	DNQ	DNQ	28	30	DNQ	DNQ	DNQ	DNQ			DNQ	DNQ	DNQ	DNQ			0
	(United States) Summerlin	Husqvarna	35	36	DNQ	DNQ	29	29	DNQ	DNQ																	0
	(United States) Delnicki	Yamaha											29	32													0
	(United States) Santos	Husqvarna			36	36	DNQ	DNQ											29	32							0
	(Dominican Republic) Duran	KTM							30	Ret					DNQ	DNQ					DNQ	DNQ	37	33			0
	(United States) Roth	Honda			DNQ	DNQ	DNQ	DNQ	DNQ	30			DNQ	33			DNQ	DNQ			DNQ	DNQ					0
	(United States) Larsen	Yamaha											30	DNS													0
	(United States) Gray	Yamaha					31	31																			0
	(United States) DuClos	Yamaha													DNQ	31	DNQ	DNQ			DNQ	DNQ			DNQ	DNQ	0
	(United States) Silveira	Honda	Ret	Ret	Ret	Ret	37	32											31	Ret							0
	(United States) Barry	Yamaha							DNQ	DNQ	DNQ	DNQ	DNQ	31	DNQ	DNQ					DNQ	DNQ	DNQ	DNQ			0
	(United States) Adamson	Yamaha															36	31									0
	(United States) Wells	KTM							Ret	31																	0
	(United States) Galamba	Kawasaki													DNQ	DNQ	32	32									0
	(United States) Dillin	KTM							DNQ	DNQ					DNQ	DNQ					32	DNS					0
	(United States) Tomasunas	Yamaha													33	32							DNQ	DNQ			0
	(United States) Myers	Husqvarna																	32	33							0
	(United States) McConnell	Yamaha							Ret	Ret	Ret	32			DNQ	DNQ					DNQ	DNQ	DNQ	DNQ			0
	(United States) Blackburn	KTM	DNQ	DNQ	DNQ	DNQ	DNQ	33																			0
	(United States) Ioppolo	Yamaha	DNQ	35	DNQ	DNQ	DNQ	DNQ	DNQ	DNQ	DNQ	DNQ	DNQ	DNQ	DNQ	DNQ	DNQ	DNQ	33	Ret	DNQ	DNQ	DNQ	DNQ			0
	(United States) Medeiros	Yamaha	DNQ	DNQ	DNQ	DNQ	DNQ	DNQ											34	34							0
	(United States) Minuto	Yamaha			DNQ	35																					0
	(United States) Sweeney	KTM					36	35																			0
	(United States) Prier	Honda															38	35									0
	(United States) Oxborrow	KTM																	35	Ret							0
	(United States) Monks	KTM					38	36									DNQ	DNQ									0
	(United States) Cobian	Kawasaki															39	36							Ret	Ret	0
	(United States) Doolittle	Suzuki							DNQ	DNQ	DNQ	DNQ	DNQ	DNQ							DNQ	36	DNQ	DNQ			0
	(United States) Weaver	Yamaha							DNQ	DNQ	DNQ	DNQ			DNQ	DNQ									Ret	Ret	0
	(United States) Hardcastle	Kawasaki									DNQ	DNQ			DNQ	DNQ									Ret	Ret	0
	(United States) Ponton III	Honda													DNQ	DNQ	DNQ	DNQ							Ret	Ret	0
	(United States) Klann	Honda							DNQ	DNQ			Ret	Ret	DNQ	DNQ											0
	(United States) Hall	KTM																			Ret	Ret					0
	(United States) Kessler	Honda											Ret	DNS													0
	(United States) Robinson	Suzuki											DNS	DNS							DNQ	DNQ					0
	(United States) Persha	KTM					DNQ	DNQ							DNQ	DNQ	DNQ	DNQ			DNQ	DNQ			DNQ	DNQ	0
	(United States) McDonnell	Kawasaki							DNQ	DNQ	DNQ	DNQ	DNQ	DNQ							DNQ	DNQ	DNQ	DNQ			0
	(United States) A. Leininger	Honda							DNQ	DNQ	DNQ	DNQ			DNQ	DNQ							DNQ	DNQ	DNQ	DNQ	0
	(United States) J. Leininger	Honda							DNQ	DNQ	DNQ	DNQ			DNQ	DNQ							DNQ	DNQ	DNQ	DNQ	0
	(United States) Dickson	Honda							DNQ	DNQ			DNQ	DNQ	DNQ	DNQ	DNQ	DNQ							DNQ	DNQ	0
	(United States) Hopkins	KTM					DNQ	DNQ			DNQ	DNQ	DNQ	DNQ	DNQ	DNQ											0
	(United States) Lechien	KTM							DNQ	DNQ	DNQ	DNQ	DNQ	DNQ	DNQ	DNQ											0
	(United States) Ridel	Husqvarna							DNQ	DNQ	DNQ	DNQ	DNQ	DNQ									DNQ	DNQ			0
	(United States) P. Smith	Kawasaki							DNQ	DNQ	DNQ	DNQ			DNQ	DNQ											0
	(United States) G. Smith	Honda							DNQ	DNQ	DNQ	DNQ			DNQ	DNQ											0
	(United States) Henshaw	Honda							DNQ	DNQ			DNQ	DNQ							DNQ	DNQ					0
	(United States) Hugney	Honda							DNQ	DNQ					DNQ	DNQ							DNQ	DNQ			0
	(United States) MacDonald	Honda									DNQ	DNQ	DNQ	DNQ							DNQ	DNQ					0
	(United States) Neys	KTM									DNQ	DNQ			DNQ	DNQ									DNQ	DNQ	0
	(United States) Brooks	Kawasaki											DNQ	DNQ	DNQ	DNQ							DNQ	DNQ			0
	(United States) Moore	KTM											DNQ	DNQ	DNQ	DNQ							DNQ	DNQ			0
	(United States) Usko	Kawasaki													DNQ	DNQ					DNQ	DNQ	DNQ	DNQ			0
	(United States) Astudillo	KTM													DNQ	DNQ					DNQ	DNQ	DNQ	DNQ			0
	(United States) Thompson	Yamaha							DNQ	DNQ	DNQ	DNQ															0
	(United States) Fratz-Orr	KTM							DNQ	DNQ					DNQ	DNQ											0
	(United States) Fisk	Yamaha									DNQ	DNQ	DNQ	DNQ													0
	(United States) Karl	Honda											DNQ	DNQ			DNQ	DNQ									0
	(United States) Dreisbach	Yamaha											DNQ	DNQ							DNQ	DNQ					0
	(United States) Brouillard	KTM											DNQ	DNQ							DNQ	DNQ					0
	(United States) Kroone	Yamaha													DNQ	DNQ	DNQ	DNQ									0
	(United States) Rubacalva	Honda													DNQ	DNQ	DNQ	DNQ									0
	(United States) Czarnota	KTM													DNQ	DNQ							DNQ	DNQ			0
	(United States) Rigsby	KTM													DNQ	DNQ							DNQ	DNQ			0
	(United States) De Keyrel	Kawasaki															DNQ	DNQ							DNQ	DNQ	0
	(United States) Wernig	Honda																			DNQ	DNQ	DNQ	DNQ			0
	(United States) Duymich	Honda																			DNQ	DNQ	DNQ	DNQ			0
	(United States) Peddie	Honda	DNQ	DNQ																							0
	(United States) Bork	Yamaha			DNQ	DNQ																					0
	(Germany) Klakow	Husqvarna			DNQ	DNQ																					0
	(United States) Brewster	Honda					DNQ	DNQ																			0
	(United States) Snyder	KTM							DNQ	DNQ																	0
	(United States) T. Smith	Kawasaki							DNQ	DNQ																	0
	(United States) Durivage	Honda							DNQ	DNQ																	0
	(United States) Robin	Honda							DNQ	DNQ																	0
	(United States) Tate	KTM									DNQ	DNQ															0
	(United States) Lee	Honda									DNQ	DNQ															0
	(United States) Lauro	KTM											DNQ	DNQ													0
	(United States) Pesci	Yamaha													DNQ	DNQ											0
	(United States) Denzler	KTM													DNQ	DNQ											0
	(United States) Braun	Honda													DNQ	DNQ											0
	(United States) Peterson	Honda													DNQ	DNQ											0
	(United States) DeNeen	KTM													DNQ	DNQ											0
	(United States) DeBower	Husqvarna															DNQ	DNQ									0
	(United States) Chambers	Kawasaki																			DNQ	DNQ					0
	(United States) Bristol	KTM																			DNQ	DNQ					0
	(United States) Hess	KTM																			DNQ	DNQ					0
	(United States) Keith	Yamaha																					DNQ	DNQ			0
	(United States) Dragonetti	Kawasaki																					DNQ	DNQ			0
	(United States) Maladra	KTM																					DNQ	DNQ			0
	(United States) Tait	Yamaha																					DNQ	DNQ			0
	(United States) Schock	Yamaha																							DNQ	DNQ	0
Pos	Rider	Bike	HAN (California)		GLN (California)		THU (Colorado)		HIG (Pennsylvania)		TEN (Tennessee)		SOU (Massachusetts)		RED (Michigan)		SPR (Minnesota)		WAS (Washington (state))		UNA (New York (state))		BUD (Maryland)		IRN (Indiana)		Points
