= 2020 AMA Supercross Championship =

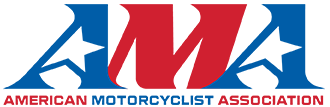
- Organizer: American Motorcyclist Association, Feld Entertainment (except Daytona), NASCAR Holdings, Inc. (Daytona)
- Discipline: Supercross
- Duration: January - June 2020
- Races: 17
- TV partner: NBC Sports

Champions
- 450cc: (United States) Eli Tomac

AMA Supercross Championship
- ← 2019 2021 →

The 2020 AMA Supercross Championship is an American motorcycle racing championship that started January 4, 2020, and ended June 21, 2020. Ten of the 17 rounds had been completed when the season was suspended on March 12, 2020, as a result of the COVID-19 pandemic. On May 14, 2020, promoter Feld Entertainment announced the season would conclude with races on Wednesdays and Sundays at Rice-Eccles Stadium in Salt Lake City, Utah.

== Results ==
Race Winners (Note: A (W) next to the event indicates it is part of the 250 SX West Championship, while an (E) indicates it is part of the 250 SX East Championship. (E/W) indicates a 250 SX East/250 SX West combination event.) (Note: B (TC) indicates a Triple Crown event.)
| Round | Date | Location | Stadium | 450SX Winner | 250SX Winner |
|---|---|---|---|---|---|
| 1 (W) | 4 January | (California) Anaheim | Angel Stadium | (United States) Justin Barcia | (United States) Justin Cooper |
| 2 (W) | 11 January | (Missouri) St. Louis | The Dome at America's Center | (Germany) Ken Roczen | (United States) Austin Forkner |
| 3 (W) | 18 January | (California) Anaheim | Angel Stadium | (United States) Eli Tomac | (France) Dylan Ferrandis |
| 4 (W) (TC) | 25 January | (Arizona) Glendale | State Farm Stadium | (Germany) Ken Roczen | (United States) Austin Forkner |
| 5 (W) | 1 February | (California) Oakland | RingCentral Coliseum | (United States) Eli Tomac | (France) Dylan Ferrandis |
| 6 (W) | 8 February | (California) San Diego | PETCO Park | (United States) Cooper Webb | (France) Dylan Ferrandis |
| 7 (E) | 15 February | (Florida) Tampa | Raymond James Stadium | (United States) Eli Tomac | (United States) Shane McElrath |
| 8 (E) (TC) | 22 February | (Texas) Arlington | AT&T Stadium | (United States) Eli Tomac | (United States) Chase Sexton |
| 9 (E) | 29 February | (Georgia (U.S. state)) Atlanta | Mercedes-Benz Stadium | (Germany) Ken Roczen | (United States) Chase Sexton |
| 10 (E) | 7 March | (Florida) Daytona Beach | Daytona International Speedway | (United States) Eli Tomac | (United States) Garrett Marchbanks |
| 11 (E) | 31 May | (Utah) Salt Lake City | Rice-Eccles Stadium | (United States) Eli Tomac | (United States) Shane McElrath |
| 12 (E) | 3 June | (Utah) Salt Lake City | Rice-Eccles Stadium | (United States) Cooper Webb | (United States) Shane McElrath |
| 13 (E) | 7 June | (Utah) Salt Lake City | Rice-Eccles Stadium | (United States) Eli Tomac | (United States) Chase Sexton |
| 14 (W) | 10 June | (Utah) Salt Lake City | Rice-Eccles Stadium | (United States) Cooper Webb | (United States) Austin Forkner |
| 15 (W) | 14 June | (Utah) Salt Lake City | Rice-Eccles Stadium | (Germany) Ken Roczen | (United States) Austin Forkner |
| 16 (E) | 17 June | (Utah) Salt Lake City | Rice-Eccles Stadium | (United States) Cooper Webb | (United States) Chase Sexton |
| 17 (E/W) | 21 June | (Utah) Salt Lake City | Rice-Eccles Stadium | (United States) Zach Osborne | (United States) Chase Sexton |

=== Events Rescheduled / Relocated ===
Races at rounds 11-17 were cancelled due to the COVID-19 outbreak. On March 25, 2020, Feld Motor Sports announced their intention to complete the season later in the year. On May 14, 2020, the Feld Motor Sports announced the season would finish with seven races over May and June behind closed doors. These races were held at Rice-Eccles Stadium in Salt Lake City, Utah, which was to have hosted just Round 17 on May 2. Six venues lost their events.

Cancelled Dates
| Round | Region | Date | Location | Venue |
|---|---|---|---|---|
| 11 | E | 14 Mar | (Indiana) Indianapolis | Lucas Oil Stadium |
| 12 | E | 21 March | (Michigan) Detroit | Ford Field |
| 13 | E/W | 28 March | (Washington (state)) Seattle | CenturyLink Field |
| 14 | W | 4 April | (Colorado) Denver | Empower Field |
| 15 | E | 18 April | (Massachusetts) Foxborough | Gillette Stadium |
| 16 | W | 25 April | (Nevada) Las Vegas | Sam Boyd Stadium |

== Season Recap ==
Justin Barcia opened the season with his second consecutive win at Anaheim 1. One week later, Ken Roczen took his first win three years after suffering a hard crash that had left him with a badly injured arm. At Round 3, Eli Tomac became the third different winner in as many races to open the 2020 season. Roczen and Tomac would proceed to dominate the middle portion of the season, with the exception of the San Diego Supercross where defending champion Cooper Webb took the victory. After the season was suspended by the COVID-19 pandemic, Feld Motor Sports announced the season would finish in four weeks with seven rounds in Salt Lake City, with Sunday and Wednesday rounds only. Webb and Tomac would win most of the races while Roczen and Zach Osborne would each win 1. Tomac would win the title.

== 450SX ==
=== Riders Championship ===
| Pos | No. | Rider | Bike | AN1 (California) | STL (Missouri) | AN2 (California) | GLE (Arizona) | OAK (California) | SND (California) | TAM (Florida) | ARL (Texas) | ATL (Georgia (U.S. state)) | DAY (Florida) | SL1 (Utah) | SL2 (Utah) | SL3 (Utah) | SL4 (Utah) | SL5 (Utah) | SL6 (Utah) | SL7 (Utah) | Points |
|---|---|---|---|---|---|---|---|---|---|---|---|---|---|---|---|---|---|---|---|---|---|
| 1 | 3 | (United States) Eli Tomac | Kawasaki | 7 | 4 | 1 | 2 | 1 | 4 | 1 | 1 | 4 | 1 | 1 | 2 | 1 | 3 | 3 | 2 | 5 | 384 |
| 2 | 1 | (United States) Cooper Webb | KTM | 3 | 12 | 3 | 4 | 2 | 1 | 2 | 12 | 3 | 3 | 2 | 1 | 2 | 1 | 2 | 1 | 8 | 359 |
| 3 | 94 | (Germany) Ken Roczen | Honda | 6 | 1 | 2 | 1 | 3 | 6 | 3 | 2 | 1 | 2 | 3 | 5 | 10 | 5 | 1 | 4 | 7 | 354 |
| 4 | 21 | (United States) Jason Anderson | Husqvarna | 5 | 3 | 5 | 3 | 5 | 14 | 10 | 3 | 11 | 4 | 4 | 4 | 3 | 7 | 22 | 5 | 2 | 287 |
| 5 | 51 | (United States) Justin Barcia | Yamaha | 1 | 2 | 9 | 5 | 6 | 5 | 4 | 4 | 2 | 5 | 8 | 8 | 9 | 21 | 9 | 9 | 20 | 272 |
| 6 | 16 | (United States) Zach Osborne | Husqvarna | 14 | 5 | 4 | 18 | 11 | 11 | 11 | 5 | | | 5 | 3 | 4 | 2 | 4 | 3 | 1 | 252 |
| 7 | 27 | (United States) Malcolm Stewart | Honda | 9 | 6 | 8 | 7 | 10 | 8 | 7 | 7 | 8 | 8 | 11 | 7 | 5 | 22 | 5 | 7 | 4 | 252 |
| 8 | 15 | (United Kingdom) Dean Wilson | Husqvarna | 13 | 13 | 10 | 13 | 7 | 13 | 6 | 9 | 10 | 7 | 10 | 6 | 6 | 8 | 6 | 13 | 3 | 239 |
| 9 | 10 | (United States) Justin Brayton | Honda | 8 | 8 | 7 | 6 | 13 | 7 | 9 | 21 | 12 | 10 | 9 | 9 | 7 | 12 | 8 | 6 | 12 | 227 |
| 10 | 46 | (United States) Justin Hill | Honda | 11 | 11 | 12 | 12 | 8 | 9 | 5 | 6 | 6 | 9 | 16 | 10 | 15 | 13 | 14 | 12 | 9 | 213 |
| 11 | 7 | (United States) Aaron Plessinger | Yamaha | 12 | 10 | 15 | 9 | 12 | 10 | 16 | 8 | 7 | 6 | 12 | 12 | 11 | 9 | 10 | 14 | 11 | 207 |
| 12 | 4 | (United States) Blake Baggett | KTM | 4 | 9 | 14 | 10 | 9 | 3 | 22 | 10 | 19 | 22 | 7 | 14 | 12 | 4 | 7 | 10 | 16 | 200 |
| 13 | 37 | (Ecuador) Martin Davalos | KTM | 15 | 22 | 13 | 11 | 15 | 12 | 14 | 17 | 5 | 14 | 6 | 11 | 8 | 6 | 19 | 8 | 17 | 178 |
| 14 | 64 | (United States) Vince Friese | Honda | 10 | 14 | 11 | 14 | 14 | 15 | 13 | 11 | 9 | 11 | 18 | 16 | 16 | 15 | 17 | 17 | 15 | 155 |
| 15 | 9 | (United States) Adam Cianciarulo | Kawasaki | 2 | 7 | 6 | 8 | 4 | 2 | 8 | DNS | | | 22 | DNQ | | | | | | 129 |
| 16 | 22 | (Australia) Chad Reed | KTM | 18 | 21 | 18 | 20 | | 21 | 19 | 13 | 15 | 13 | 19 | 17 | 14 | 11 | 11 | 15 | 10 | 113 |
| 17 | 50 | (United States) Benny Bloss | KTM | DNQ | 17 | 22 | DNQ | | 17 | DNQ | | 13 | 12 | 13 | 13 | 13 | 10 | 13 | 11 | 14 | 108 |
| 18 | 34 | (United States) Tyler Bowers | Kawasaki | 17 | | 17 | 15 | 16 | 16 | 15 | 16 | 14 | 21 | 20 | 21 | 20 | 14 | 15 | 21 | 13 | 97 |
| 19 | 11 | (United States) Kyle Chisholm | Kawasaki | 19 | | DNQ | | 17 | 18 | 17 | 15 | 16 | 15 | 15 | 18 | 18 | 16 | 16 | 19 | 18 | 85 |
| 20 | 20 | (United States) Broc Tickle | Suzuki | | | | | | | 12 | 22 | | | DNQ | | 17 | 17 | 12 | 16 | 6 | 59 |
| 21 | 44 | (United States) Kyle Cunningham | Suzuki | DNQ | 16 | DNQ | DNQ | 19 | DNQ | 18 | 18 | 21 | | 14 | 15 | 19 | 19 | DNQ | 18 | DNQ | 53 |
| 22 | 71 | (United States) Ryan Breece | Suzuki | DNQ | | 20 | 16 | 21 | 22 | 20 | 14 | 22 | 18 | DNQ | 22 | 21 | DNQ | 20 | DNQ | DNQ | 37 |
| 23 | 61 | (United States) Alex Ray | Kawasaki | DNQ | 19 | 21 | 19 | 18 | 19 | DNQ | DNQ | DNQ | DNQ | 17 | DNQ | DNQ | 18 | DNQ | 22 | 21 | 33 |
| 24 | 19 | (United States) Justin Bogle | KTM | 16 | 15 | 16 | 21 | | | | | | | | | | | | | | 24 |
| 25 | 722 | (United States) Adam Enticknap | Suzuki | DNQ | | DNQ | DNQ | DNQ | DNQ | 21 | DNQ | 17 | 19 | DNQ | 19 | DNQ | DNQ | 18 | DNQ | DNQ | 21 |
| 26 | 49 | (United States) Chris Blose | Honda | 20 | 18 | 19 | 17 | | | | | | | | | | | | | | 18 |
| 27 | 31 | (Sweden) Fredrik Noren | Suzuki | 21 | DNQ | | | | | | | | | 21 | DNQ | DNQ | DNQ | DNQ | 20 | 19 | 11 |
| 28 | 393 | (United States) Daniel Herrlein | KTM | | DNQ | | | | | DNQ | DNQ | 18 | 20 | | | | | | | | 8 |
| 29 | 91 | (United States) Ryan Sipes | KTM | | | | | | | | | | 16 | | | | | | | | 7 |
| 30 | 65 | (United States) James Weeks | Yamaha | DNQ | | DNQ | DNQ | DNQ | DNQ | DNQ | 19 | 20 | DNQ | | | | | | | | 7 |
| 31 | 69 | (United States) Carlen Gardner | Honda | | | | | | | | | | | DNQ | 20 | DNQ | 20 | DNQ | DNQ | 22 | 7 |
| 32 | 48 | (United States) Henry Miller | KTM | | | | | | | | DNQ | DNQ | 17 | | | | | | | | 6 |
| 33 | 53 | (United States) James Decotis | Suzuki | 22 | 20 | DNQ | | | | | | | | | | | | | | | 4 |
| 34 | 606 | (United States) Ronnie Stewart | Husqvarna | | | | | | | DNQ | 20 | DNQ | DNQ | | | | | | | | 3 |
| 35 | 817 | (France) Jason Clermont | Kawasaki | DNQ | | DNQ | DNQ | DNQ | 20 | | | | | | | | | | | | 3 |
| 36 | 82 | (United States) Cade Autenrieth | Honda | DNQ | | DNQ | DNQ | 20 | DNQ | | DNQ | | | | | | | | | | 3 |
| 37 | 597 | (United States) Mason Kerr | Kawasaki | | | | | | | DNQ | | DNQ | | DNQ | DNQ | DNQ | DNQ | 21 | DNQ | DNQ | 2 |
| 38 | 67 | (United States) Jerry Robin | Honda | DNQ | | DNQ | 22 | | DNQ | | | | | | | | | | | DNQ | 1 |
| 39 | 86 | (United States) Joshua Cartwright | Kawasaki | DNQ | DNQ | DNQ | DNQ | 22 | DNQ | DNQ | DNQ | | | DNQ | DNQ | DNQ | DNQ | DNQ | DNQ | DNQ | 1 |
| 40 | 88 | (United States) Logan Karnow | Kawasaki | | | | | | | DNQ | DNQ | DNQ | DNQ | DNQ | DNQ | 22 | | | DNQ | | 1 |
| | 280 | (United States) Cade Clason | Kawasaki | DNQ | DNQ | DNQ | DNQ | DNQ | DNQ | DNQ | DNQ | DNQ | DNQ | DNQ | DNQ | DNQ | DNQ | DNQ | DNQ | DNQ | 0 |
| | 282 | (United States) Theodore Pauli | Kawasaki | DNQ | DNQ | DNQ | DNQ | DNQ | DNQ | DNQ | DNQ | DNQ | DNQ | DNQ | DNQ | DNQ | DNQ | DNQ | DNQ | DNQ | 0 |
| | 976 | (United States) Josh Greco | KTM | DNQ | DNQ | DNQ | DNQ | DNQ | DNQ | DNQ | DNQ | DNQ | DNQ | DNQ | DNQ | DNQ | DNQ | DNQ | DNQ | DNQ | 0 |
| | 509 | (United States) Alexander Nagy | KTM | DNQ | DNQ | DNQ | DNQ | DNQ | DNQ | DNQ | | DNQ | DNQ | DNQ | DNQ | DNQ | DNQ | DNQ | DNQ | DNQ | 0 |
| | 501 | (United States) Scotty Wennerstrom | Kawasaki | DNQ | DNQ | DNQ | | DNQ | DNQ | DNQ | DNQ | DNQ | DNQ | DNQ | DNQ | DNQ | DNQ | DNQ | DNQ | DNQ | 0 |
| | 114 | (United States) Nick Schmidt | Husqvarna | DNQ | | DNQ | DNQ | DNQ | DNQ | DNQ | DNQ | DNQ | DNQ | DNQ | DNQ | DNQ | DNQ | DNQ | DNQ | DNQ | 0 |
| | 447 | (United States) Deven Raper | Kawasaki | DNQ | | DNQ | DNQ | DNQ | DNQ | DNQ | DNQ | DNQ | DNQ | DNQ | DNQ | DNQ | DNQ | DNQ | DNQ | DNQ | 0 |
| | 211 | (United States) Tevin Tapia | Yamaha | | | | | | DNQ | DNQ | DNQ | DNQ | DNQ | DNQ | DNQ | DNQ | DNQ | DNQ | DNQ | DNQ | 0 |
| | 848 | (Spain) Joan Cros | Kawasaki | DNQ | DNQ | DNQ | DNQ | DNQ | DNQ | DNQ | DNQ | DNQ | DNQ | | | | | | | | 0 |
| | 330 | (United States) AJ Catanzaro | Kawasaki | DNQ | DNQ | DNQ | DNQ | DNQ | DNQ | DNQ | DNQ | DNQ | DNQ | | | | | | | | 0 |
| | 651 | (United States) Jake Hogan | Yamaha | DNQ | DNQ | DNQ | DNQ | DNQ | DNQ | | | | | DNQ | DNQ | DNQ | DNQ | | | | 0 |
| | 981 | (United States) Curren Thurman | KTM | DNQ | DNQ | DNQ | DNQ | DNQ | DNQ | | | | | | | | DNQ | DNQ | | | 0 |
| | 824 | (United States) Carter Stephenson | Kawasaki | | DNQ | | | | | | | | | DNQ | DNQ | DNQ | DNQ | DNQ | DNQ | DNQ | 0 |
| | 996 | (United States) Preston Taylor | Kawasaki | | | | | | | | | | DNQ | DNQ | DNQ | DNQ | DNQ | DNQ | DNQ | DNQ | 0 |
| | 230 | (Australia) Joel Wightman | Honda | DNQ | DNQ | DNQ | DNQ | DNQ | DNQ | | | | | | | | | | | | 0 |
| | 135 | (United States) Robert Fitch | Honda | DNQ | | DNQ | DNQ | | DNQ | | DNQ | | DNQ | | | | | | | | 0 |
| | 92 | (United States) Austin Politelli | Honda | DNQ | DNQ | DNQ | DNQ | | DNQ | | | | | | | | | | | | 0 |
| | 70 | (United States) Dylan Merriam | Honda | DNQ | DNQ | DNQ | | | | | | DNQ | DNQ | | | | | | | | 0 |
| | 412 | (United States) Jared Lesher | KTM | | DNQ | | | | | DNQ | DNQ | DNQ | DNQ | | | | | | | | 0 |
| | 526 | (United States) Colton Aeck | Honda | DNQ | DNQ | DNQ | DNQ | | | | | | | | | | | | | | 0 |
| | 56 | (United States) Justin Starling | Honda | DNQ | | DNQ | DNQ | | | | | | | | | | DNQ | | | | 0 |
| | 43 | (United States) John Short | Honda | | | DNQ | DNQ | | DNQ | | | | | | | | | DNQ | | | 0 |
| | 304 | (Brazil) Hector Assunção | Honda | DNQ | | DNQ | DNQ | | | | | | | | | | | | | | 0 |
| | 145 | (United States) Travis Smith | KTM | DNQ | | DNQ | | | DNQ | | | | | | | | | | | | 0 |
| | 256 | (United States) James Milson | Kawasaki | | | DNQ | | DNQ | DNQ | | | | | | | | | | | | 0 |
| | 421 | (United States) Vann Martin | KTM | DNQ | DNQ | | | | | | | | | | | | | | | | 0 |
| | 138 | (United States) David Pulley | Honda | DNQ | DNQ | | | | | | | | | | | | | | | | 0 |
| | 675 | (United States) Kyle Dillin | KTM | | DNQ | | | | | DNQ | | | | | | | | | | | 0 |
| | 542 | (United States) Johnnie Buller | Suzuki | | | DNQ | | DNQ | | | | | | | | | | | | | 0 |
| | 118 | (United States) Cheyenne Harmon | Honda | | | | | | | | DNQ | | | | | | | | DNQ | | 0 |
| | 221 | (Denmark) Mathias Jørgensen | Kawasaki | | | | | | | | | DNQ | DNQ | | | | | | | | 0 |
| | 831 | (United States) Ryan Smith | Yamaha | | | | | | | | | DNQ | DNQ | | | | | | | | 0 |
| | 795 | (United States) Aaron Leininger | Honda | | | | | | | | | DNQ | DNQ | | | | | | | | 0 |
| | 360 | (United States) Aaron Siminoe | Kawasaki | DNQ | | | | | | | | | | | | | | | | | 0 |
| | 424 | (United States) Tyler Custer | Honda | DNQ | | | | | | | | | | | | | | | | | 0 |
| | 332 | (United States) Dustin Winter | Kawasaki | | DNQ | | | | | | | | | | | | | | | | 0 |
| | 570 | (United States) Cody Vanbuskirk | KTM | | DNQ | | | | | | | | | | | | | | | | 0 |
| | 240 | (United States) Bryce Stewart | Yamaha | | | DNQ | | | | | | | | | | | | | | | 0 |
| | 98 | (Zambia) Bradley Lionnet | Yamaha | | | | | | DNQ | | | | | | | | | | | | 0 |
| | 42 | (United States) Ben Lamay | Honda | | | | | | | | DNQ | | | | | | | | | | 0 |
| | 224 | (France) Charles Lefrançois | Suzuki | | | | | | | | | | DNQ | | | | | | | | 0 |
| | 171 | (United States) Davey Fraser | Husqvarna | | | | | | | | | | DNQ | | | | | | | | 0 |
| | 72 | (United States) Robbie Wageman | Yamaha | | | | | | | | | | | | | | | | DNQ | | 0 |
| | 185 | (United States) Wilson Fleming | Honda | | | | | | | | | | | | | | | | | DNQ | 0 |
| | 837 | (United States) Bryson Gardner | Honda | | | | | | | | | | | | | | | | | DNQ | 0 |
| Pos | No. | Rider | Bike | AN1 (California) | STL (Missouri) | AN2 (California) | GLE (Arizona) | OAK (California) | SND (California) | TAM (Florida) | ARL (Texas) | ATL (Georgia (U.S. state)) | DAY (Florida) | SL1 (Utah) | SL2 (Utah) | SL3 (Utah) | SL4 (Utah) | SL5 (Utah) | SL6 (Utah) | SL7 (Utah) | Points |
