= Austin Forkner =

American motocross racer (born 1998)

- Nationality: (United States) American
- Born: September 2, 1998 (age 28) Richards, Missouri, US

Motocross career
- Years active: 2016–2026
- Teams: •Monster Energy Pro Circuit Kawasaki (2016–2024); •Triumph Factory Racing Team (2024-2026)
- Wins: •AMA 250cc Motocross: 1; •AMA 250cc Supercross: 13

Austin Forkner (born September 2, 1998) is a former American professional Motocross and Supercross racer. Forkner competed in the AMA Supercross Championship and AMA Motocross Championship from 2016 to 2026.

Forkner's greatest successes came in the AMA Supercross Championship, where twice finished third in the final standings. He is one of the most successful riders in the history of supercross to never win a championship, taking thirteen main event wins and twenty-one overall podiums.

For the majority of his career, Forkner competed for the Monster Energy Pro Circuit Kawasaki team, before switching to Triumph's factory squad in his final two years.

Forkner competed at the two season-ending American rounds of the 2016 FIM Motocross World Championship in the MX2 class, just after turning pro. At the first of these he qualified in pole position and ended the event third overall behind Cooper Webb and Jeffrey Herlings.

Forkner picked up numerous injuries during his career, some of which came when he was in a championship leading position.

== Career ==
=== Amateur career ===
Forkner worked his way through the ranks of the American amateur system, winning six titles at the AMA Amateur National Motocross Championship. After winning his first two titles aboard a Suzuki in the 85cc categories in 2010, he was signed by the Team Green amateur Kawasaki squad. In his final year as an amateur rider in 2015, Forkner won his fifth and sixth Amateur National titles, as well as winning the Amateur All-Stars race at the Monster Energy Cup supercross race. Following this, he signed a multi-year contract with the Monster Energy Pro Circuit Kawasaki team for his professional debut in 2016.

=== Professional career ===
Forkner's professional debut came in the 250 class of the 2016 AMA National Motocross Championship. He immediately showed his speed, being a figure in the top ten from the opening round, before finishing third in the first race at the second round. Progressing further, he scored his first overall podium at the seventh round. He was able to finish on the podium at all four of the final rounds of the season, winning his first race at the ninth round and rounding out his rookie season with his first overall win at the final round. Following this, Forkner competed at the final two rounds of the 2016 FIM Motocross World Championship in the MX2 class. As a wildcard rider Forkner performed very well, finishing third overall at the first of these two grand prix and finishing third in the first race of the second one.

In 2017, Forkner made his professional supercross debut in the 250SX West class. Again he was an immediate feature towards the front of the field, grabbing his first professional supercross podium at the third round in Phoenix, Arizona before finishing second two rounds later. His season started strongly in the 250 class of the 2017 AMA National Motocross Championship following this, scoring several top-three race finishes and a podium at the fifth round. A severe concussion following the seventh round of the series ruled him out for the remainder of the rounds. For the 2018 supercross season, Forkner competed in the 250SX East class, taking his professional supercross win at the second round in Tampa. He won again at the following round in Atlanta and finished second at the round after that, however, he finished fourth in the final standings due to missing the last two rounds with a separated shoulder. Forkner finished seventh in the 250 standings of the 2018 AMA National Motocross Championship with a single race win and overall podium being the highlights of the campaign.

Forkner had a dominant start to the 2019 AMA Supercross Championship in the 250SX East class, winning five of the first six rounds and finishing second in the other. With only three rounds left in the series and a clear lead in the championship, Forkner sustained a fully torn Anterior cruciate ligament in qualifying for the Nashville round. Despite trying to ride on the injury at the penultimate round, Forkner ultimately dropped to third in the standings and missed the rest of 2019 following surgery on the injury. He made his comeback in the 2020 AMA Supercross Championship, this time in the 250SX West class. He was again a championship challenger, picking up four wins and two second places, going into the final round only six points behind leader Dylan Ferrandis. With Ferrandis taking a bad start and Forkner running in second in the final, it looked like he could take the championship. However, a crash ended his hopes and saw him pick up multiple abdominal injuries, causing him to again miss the entire AMA Motocross Championship.

Forkner returned to the 250SX East class for the 2021 AMA Supercross Championship. After finishing a strong second in the opening round, he broke his collarbone qualifying for the third round of the season, missing the rest of the championship. Forkner managed to recover in time to compete a full season of the 250 class in the 2021 AMA National Motocross Championship, finishing seventh in the final standings, with two fifth overalls being the highlights of his campaign. In the 2022 AMA Supercross Championship, Forkner again finished second at the opening round of 250SX East. He then went on to again suffer a broken collarbone after being cross-jumped by Jett Lawrence over the finish line at the second round. A good recovery from the injury saw him return for the last three rounds, winning the penultimate round in Foxborough, Massachusetts. In training for the 2022 AMA National Motocross Championship, Forkner sustained a shoulder injury. He finished sixth overall in the 250 class at the opening round of the series but then opted to undergo reparative surgery on the injury, causing him to miss the remaining rounds.

Forkner's 2023 AMA Supercross Championship ended at the first round of the 250SX West class, tangling with two other riders and sustaining several knee injuries as well as a broken bone in his hand from the ensuing crash. This took him out for the remainder of the supercross season and the first half of the 2023 AMA National Motocross Championship. A fourth overall at the penultimate round of the motocross series was his highlight of the season. He swapped to the 250SX East class for the 2024 AMA Supercross Championship, starting off in the best possible way by winning the opening round. At the second round, Forkner was fastest on track and had a clear lead in the final when he had a brutal crash that saw him sustain an injury to his spine and scapula. As with previous years, this saw him miss the remainder of the supercross season as well as the summer motocross season.

Following the conclusion of the 2024 season, it was announced that Forkner would leave Kawasaki and compete for a different manufacturer for the first time in his career. The 2025 SuperMotocross World Championship season would see him join the Triumph Factory Racing Team and compete in the 250SX East class. The move would see Forkner complete a full supercross season for the first time in his career, although he did not challenge for any race wins or podiums throughout the championship, eventually finishing eleventh in the final standings. He had a similarly quiet season in the 2025 AMA National Motocross Championship, with fifth overall at the Washougal round being by far his best result. After finishing a strong fifth in the first playoff round of the 2025 SuperMotocross World Championship, Forkner missed the other two rounds due to a knee injury.

Forkner moved into the 450SX class for the first time in his career during the 2026 AMA Supercross Championship, piloting Triumph's new 450cc motorcycle alongside Jordon Smith. His debut season in the 450 class would only last three rounds, after a hand injury side-lined him for the rest of the championship. Forkner returned to the 250 class for the 2026 AMA National Motocross Championship but again only competed in three rounds, picking up another concussion in the last of these. Following this, on July 7, 2026, Forkner announced his retirement from professional racing.

== Honors ==
AMA Supercross Championship

- 250SX East: 2019 (bronze)
- 250SX West: 2020 (bronze)

Monster Energy Cup

- Amateur All-Stars: 2015 (gold)
- Supermini: 2013 (gold)

AMA Amateur National Motocross Championship

- 250B: 2015 (gold)
- Schoolboy 2 (13–16) B/C: 2015 (gold)
- Super Mini 1 (12–15): 2014 (silver)
- Super Mini 2 (13–16): 2014 (gold) 2013 (bronze)
- 85 (12–14) Modified: 2011 (gold)
- 85 (9–11) Modified: 2010 (gold)
- 85 (9–11) Stock: 2010 (gold)

== Career statistics ==
=== FIM Motocross World Championship ===
| Season | Class | Number | Motorcycle | Team | Race | Race Wins | Overall Wins | Race Top-3 | Overall Podium | Pts | Plcd |
|---|---|---|---|---|---|---|---|---|---|---|---|
| 2016 | MX2 | 214 | Kawasaki | Monster Energy Pro Circuit Kawasaki | 4 | 0 | 0 | 3 | 1 | 65 | 25th |
| Total | | | | | 4 | 0 | 0 | 3 | 1 | 65 | |

=== AMA Supercross Championship ===
| Season | Class | Number | Motorcycle | Team | Overall Wins | Overall Podium | Pts | Plcd |
|---|---|---|---|---|---|---|---|---|
| 2017 | 250SX West | 24 | Kawasaki | Monster Energy Pro Circuit Kawasaki | 0 | 2 | 114 | 6th |
| 2018 | 250SX East | 35 | Kawasaki | Monster Energy Pro Circuit Kawasaki | 2 | 3 | 137 | 4th |
| 2019 | 250SX East | 24 | Kawasaki | Monster Energy Pro Circuit Kawasaki | 5 | 6 | 152 | 3rd |
| 2020 | 250SX West | 52 | Kawasaki | Monster Energy Pro Circuit Kawasaki | 4 | 6 | 176 | 3rd |
| 2021 | 250SX East | 38 | Kawasaki | Monster Energy Pro Circuit Kawasaki | 0 | 1 | 40 | 21st |
| 2022 | 250SX East | 33 | Kawasaki | Monster Energy Pro Circuit Kawasaki | 1 | 2 | 98 | 9th |
| 2023 | 250SX West | 55 | Kawasaki | Monster Energy Pro Circuit Kawasaki | 0 | 0 | 1 | 38th |
| 2024 | 250SX East | 64 | Kawasaki | Monster Energy Pro Circuit Kawasaki | 1 | 1 | 27 | 17th |
| 2025 | 250SX East | 83 | Triumph | Triumph Factory Racing Team | 0 | 0 | 75 | 11th |
| 2026 | 450SX | 33 | Triumph | Triumph Factory Racing Team | 0 | 0 | 12 | 30th |
| Total | | | | | 13 | 21 | 832 | |

=== AMA National Motocross Championship ===
| Season | Class | Number | Motorcycle | Team | Races | Race Wins | Overall Wins | Race Top-3 | Overall Podium | Pts | Plcd |
|---|---|---|---|---|---|---|---|---|---|---|---|
| 2016 | 250 | 214 | Kawasaki | Monster Energy Pro Circuit Kawasaki | 24 | 2 | 1 | 7 | 5 | 376 | 4th |
| 2017 | 250 | 24 | Kawasaki | Monster Energy Pro Circuit Kawasaki | 13 | 0 | 0 | 5 | 1 | 184 | 13th |
| 2018 | 250 | 35 | Kawasaki | Monster Energy Pro Circuit Kawasaki | 24 | 1 | 0 | 7 | 1 | 314 | 7th |
| 2021 | 250 | 38 | Kawasaki | Monster Energy Pro Circuit Kawasaki | 24 | 0 | 0 | 0 | 0 | 256 | 7th |
| 2022 | 250 | 33 | Kawasaki | Monster Energy Pro Circuit Kawasaki | 2 | 0 | 0 | 0 | 0 | 30 | 26th |
| 2023 | 250 | 55 | Kawasaki | Monster Energy Pro Circuit Kawasaki | 10 | 0 | 0 | 0 | 0 | 98 | 17th |
| 2025 | 250 | 83 | Triumph | Triumph Factory Racing Team | 22 | 0 | 0 | 0 | 0 | 156 | 17th |
| 2026 | 250 | 33 | Triumph | 5.11 Triumph Factory Racing Team | 4 | 0 | 0 | 0 | 0 | 4 | 47th |
| Total | | | | | 123 | 3 | 1 | 19 | 7 | 1418 | |
