= 2019 AMA Supercross Championship =

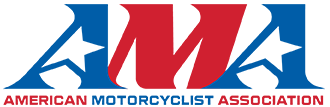
- Organizer: American Motorcyclist Association, Feld Entertainment, NASCAR Holdings (Daytona)
- Discipline: Supercross
- Duration: January - May 2019
- Races: 17
- TV partner: NBC Sports

Champions
- 450cc: (United States) Cooper Webb
- 250cc West: (United States) Dylan Ferrandis
- 250cc East: (United States) Chase Sexton

AMA Supercross Championship
- ← 2018 2020 →

The 2019 AMA Supercross Championship was an American motorcycle racing championship that took place from January 5, 2019 - May 4, 2019 over 17 rounds at various stadiums across the United States.

Cooper Webb, riding a KTM, won the championship in the 450cc class while Dylan Ferrandis won in the 250cc Western Regional class and Chase Sexton won in the 250cc Eastern Regional class.

== Calendar ==
Date	City	Stadium
January 5, 2019	Anaheim, California	Angel Stadium
January 12, 2019	Glendale, Arizona	State Farm Stadium
January 19, 2019	Anaheim, California	Angel Stadium
January 26, 2019	Oakland, California	Oakland Alameda Coliseum
February 2, 2019	San Diego, California	PETCO Park
February 9, 2019	Minneapolis, Minnesota	US Bank Stadium
February 16, 2019	Arlington, Texas	AT&T Stadium
February 23, 2019	Detroit, Michigan	Ford Field
March 2, 2019	Atlanta, Georgia	Mercedes-Benz Stadium
March 9, 2019	Daytona Beach, Florida	Daytona International Speedway
March 16, 2019	Indianapolis, Indiana	Lucas Oil Stadium
March 23, 2019	Seattle, Washington	CenturyLink Field
March 30, 2019	Houston, Texas	NRG Stadium
April 6, 2019	Nashville, Tennessee	Nissan Stadium
April 13, 2019	Denver, Colorado	Empower Field at Mile High
April 27, 2019	East Rutherford, New Jersey	MetLife Stadium
May 4, 2019	Las Vegas, Nevada	Sam Boyd Stadium

== Season Report ==
The first round of the 2019 AMA Supercross Championship was held in wet conditions in Angel Stadium in Anaheim, California on January 5. Dean Wilson led most of the 450cc Main Event but was passed for the win by Justin Barcia, who won his first race since 2013. Colt Nichols led the entirety of the 250cc Western Regional Main Event to take his first career win.

Glendale, Arizona played host to Round 2 one week later where Ken Roczen led the 450cc Main Event early until Malcolm Stewart had a crash, bringing out the red flag. After the restart, the lead changed hands twice, from Roczen to defending champion Jason Anderson and then to Blake Baggett, who took his first career 450cc Main Event win. Adam Cianciarulo cruised to victory in the 250cc Western Regional Main Event.

Eventual champion Cooper Webb took his first 450cc career win at Anaheim 2 one week after Glendale, finishing 1st, 1st and 3rd in the three 450cc Main Events in Supercross’s first “Triple Crown” event of the season. The 250cc Western Regional class also saw its third winner in as many races with Shane McElrath placing 3rd, 2nd and 1st in the three 250cc Main Events.

The fourth round of the season saw the first repeat winners of 2019 in the 450cc and 250cc Western Regional classes, as Cooper Webb and Adam Cianciarulo took the wins respectively. Webb beat his KTM teammate Marvin Musquin by 0.7 seconds.

Heavy rain before the fifth race at San Diego led to a track that was “a miserable mess of standing water and deep mud for the racers, and just completing a lap without falling or getting stuck was an accomplishment in itself”. Eli Tomac won the 450cc Main Event while Adam Cianciarulo won the 250cc Main Event. Some riders suffered skin irritation and some bikes were damaged following the race. Feld Entertainment released a statement following the race explaining that “the track crew.... Applied a drying agent, a lime and sand mixture, to treat two areas on the track to try and remove moisture from the dirt... the unprecedented amount of rain on Saturday prevented the lime from mixing with the soil as usual.” Feld offered privateer riders that competed in San Diego $5,000 each as compensation and started looking at other options for drying agents going forward.

Minneapolis marked the start of the 250cc Eastern Regional season. Cooper Webb won the 450cc Main Event while Austin Forkner won the 250cc Eastern Regional Main Event at both Minneapolis and the next race in Arlington, Texas. The 450cc Main Event in Arlington was particularly memorable as it featured a last-corner pass for the win and the closest finish in Supercross history with Webb edging Ken Roczen to the line by 0.028 seconds.

Detroit played host to the second Triple Crown race of the 2019 season, with Eli Tomac winning the 450cc event with finishes of 1st, 1st and 6th. The race also saw the 132nd career podium for 36-year-old Chad Reed, his first since 2017. Austin Forkner remained undefeated in 2019 in the 250cc Eastern Regional class, winning all three 250cc Main Events during the night’s show.

On March 2, the next round was held in Atlanta where Cooper Webb won the 450cc Main Event and Adam Cianciarulo won overall in the 250cc East/West Shootout. It was the first of two times during the season that the 250cc Eastern and Western Regional classes would race together. While Austin Forkner didn’t win the 250cc Main Event, he remained undefeated in the 250cc Eastern Regional division, beating all of the other East class competitors.

The Daytona Supercross was held on a racetrack designed by former Supercross champion Ricky Carmichael on the frontstraight of the Daytona International Speedway. Eli Tomac dominated the 450cc Main Event for his third win of the year, while Austin Forkner returned to his winning ways in the 250cc Eastern Regional Main Event.

Round 11 saw Marvin Musquin take his first win of 2019 in Indianapolis in the 450cc Main Event, ending an 11-month dry spell, while Austin Forkner won again in the 250cc Eastern Regional class. Musquin would win again at the next round in Seattle, but amid controversy. A crash claiming Chad Reed and Justin Brayton led to a section being lined with red cross flags. Riders are not allowed to jump through red cross flags and, as stated under section 4.16 of the rulebook “during a main event race, if no positions were gained, the penalty will be the points and purse equal to two positions in the final results for that race plus two additional points”. This cost Musquin seven points, but he kept the victory. Dylan Ferrandis took his first career 250cc Main Event win.

Cooper Webb won the third Triple Crown race of the season in the 450cc class with finishes of 2nd, 1st and 3rd in Houston. Webb was also claimed the 2019 Triple Crown Champion. Webb and KTM teammate Marvin Musquin had battled hard during the first main event, with Webb coming out on top. Following his penalty the previous round in Seattle, this result further hurt Musquin’s championship chances. Dylan Ferrandis, fresh off of his first career win in Seattle, followed it up with another win in the 250cc Western Regional class Main Event.

Eli Tomac was the winner of Round 14 of the 450cc season in Nashville, while Martin Davalos won the 250cc Eastern Regional class Main Event, his first win in three years. Davalos’ win came after Austin Forkner - who had been undefeated in 2019 up to that point - crashed in practice and was unable to put weight on his knee. Colorado native Tomac went on to win the next event at his home race in Denver, much to the approval of the crowd, and narrowing the points gap to the championship leader Cooper Webb. The championship battle in the 250cc Western Regional class opened back up a bit though, with Adam Cianciarulo returning to the top step of the podium and extending his points lead over Dylan Ferrandis.

Mistakes led to the lead changing hands many times during the 450cc Main Event in East Rutherford, New Jersey. When the checkered flag finally flew, it was Cooper Webb taking the win, extending his points lead to 23 points with just one race left to go. Forkner came into the race still suffering with a torn ACL from his Nashville crash, but he was able to compete in the 250cc Eastern Regional Main Event. However, he didn’t make it to the finish after jumping and landing into the face of a jump, causing further distress to his knee. This allowed Chase Sexton to go on to take his first 250cc Eastern Regional career win and take the points lead.

The final race of the season was held in Las Vegas on May 4, 2019, with all three championships on the line. For the second time during the season, the 250cc Eastern and Western Regional class riders would compete against each other on track in an East/West Shootout. Chase Sexton finished fourth in the 250cc East/West Shootout to take the 250cc Eastern Regional Championship, while Dylan Ferrandis won the 250cc Western Regional Championship by winning while his championship rival Adam Cianciarulo crashed late in the race. Cooper Webb merely needed a 20th-place finish to clinch the 450cc championship. Tomac won while Webb finished third, giving Webb the title.

== Results and standings ==
Race winners
Event	450SX Winner	250SX Winner
Anaheim 1	Justin Barcia	Colt Nichols (West)
Glendale	Blake Baggett	Adam Cianciarulo (West)
Anaheim 2	Cooper Webb	Shane McElrath (West)
Oakland	Cooper Webb	Adam Cianciarulo (West)
San Diego	Eli Tomac	Adam Cianciarulo (West)
Minneapolis	Cooper Webb	Austin Forkner (East)
Arlington	Cooper Webb	Austin Forkner (East)
Detroit	Eli Tomac	Austin Forkner (East)
Atlanta	Cooper Webb	Adam Cianciarulo (West) Austin Forkner (East)
Daytona	Eli Tomac	Austin Forkner (East)
Indianapolis	Marvin Musquin	Austin Forkner (East)
Seattle	Marvin Musquin	Dylan Ferrandis (West)
Houston	Cooper Webb	Dylan Ferrandis (West)
Nashville	Eli Tomac	Martin Davalos (East)
Denver	Eli Tomac	Adam Cianciarulo (West)
East Rutherford	Cooper Webb	Chase Sexton (East)
Las Vegas	Eli Tomac	Dylan Ferrandis (West) Chase Sexton (East)

Final Standings
	450SX	250SX West	250SX East
1st	Cooper Webb	Dylan Ferrandis	Chase Sexton
2nd	Eli Tomac	Adam Cianciarulo	Justin Cooper
3rd	Marvin Musquin	Colt Nichols	Austin Forkner
4th	Ken Roczen	RJ Hampshire	Martin Davalos
5th	Blake Baggett	Cameron Mcadoo	Alex Martin
6th	Dean Wilson	Michael Mosiman	Brandon Hartranft
7th	Cole Seely	James Decotis	Mitchell Oldenburg
8th	Joey Savatgy	Shane McElrath	Kyle Peters
9th	Justin Bogle	Chris Blose	Kyle Cunningham
10th	Justin Brayton	Garrett Marchbanks	Jordan Bailey
