= Zach Osborne =

American motorcycle racer

- Nationality: American
- Born: September 25, 1989 (age 37) Abingdon, Virginia

Motocross career
- Years active: 2006–2022, 2026
- Teams: •Geico Honda (2013-2014); •Rockstar Energy Factory Husqvarna (2015-2022); •Liqui Moly Beta Racing Team (2026)
- Championships: •2017 AMA Supercross 250cc East; •2018 AMA Supercross 250cc East; •2018 AMA Motocross 250cc; •2020 AMA Motocross 450cc
- Wins: •MX2: 1; •AMA 250cc Supercross: 6; •AMA 250cc Motocross: 6; •AMA 450cc Supercross: 1; •AMA 450cc Motocross: 4

Zach Osborne (born September 25, 1989) is an American former professional motocross, supercross and enduro racer. He competed in the AMA Motocross Championships from 2006 to 2007 and in the Motocross World Championships from 2008 to 2012, before returning to compete in the AMA Supercross & Motocross Championships from 2013 to 2021. Osborne is a 450cc & 250cc AMA Motocross champion, & a two-time AMA Supercross 250cc East Champion.

After retiring from full time racing in 2021, Osborne raced six GNCC rounds in 2023, before making a return to the AMA Motocross Championship in 2026 for the last three rounds.

== AMA Supercross/Motocross Career Results ==
Year	Rnd 1	Rnd 2	Rnd 3	Rnd 4	Rnd 5	Rnd 6	Rnd 7	Rnd 8	Rnd 9	Rnd 10	Rnd 11	Rnd 12	Rnd 13	Rnd 14	Rnd 15	Rnd 16	Rnd 17	Average Finish	Podium Percent	Place
2017 250 SX-E	-	-	-	-	-	-	3	1	1	5	1	18	3	-	-	1	7	4.44	67%	1st
2017 250 MX	1	1	5	2	2	1	1	3	2	3	2	1	-	-	-	-	-	2.00	92%	1st
2018 250 SX-E	-	-	-	-	-	-	1	3	2	4	1	7	-	2	1	-	7	3.11	67%	1st
2020 450 MX	1	1	5	1	3	10	1	3	6	-	-	-	-	-	-	-	-	3.44	67%	1st

== Motocross career ==
Osborne was born in Abingdon, Virginia. Being exposed to motocross at a young age, he received his first motorcycle at the age of three. He started his amateur racing career with KTM at age 6 and quickly progressed into the amateur nationals. He began his professional career as a privateer in 2006 before going to Red Bull KTM in 2007 and then Yamaha of Troy. After four seasons competing in the Motocross World Championships in Europe, he returned to the AMA Motocross Championships in 2013 as a member of the Geico Honda racing team. He switched to join the RockStar Husqvarna racing team in 2015.

Osborne has competed in every major global championship and the world’s most prestigious enduro competition. He was 2010 British Motocross Champion MX2 and 2013 US Trophy Team member at the International Six Days Enduro (ISDE).

Osborne won the 2017 250SX Eastern Regional supercross championship. The following season he successfully defended his 250SX Eastern Regional title. He was the 2017 AMA 250MX Champion and the 2020 AMA 450MX Champion.

Osborne led the US team in the 2019 Motocross des Nations.

Osborne has trained alongside notable riders such as Cooper Webb and Jason Anderson under the stewardship of professional motocross trainer Aldon Baker.
