= Dylan Ferrandis =

French motocross rider

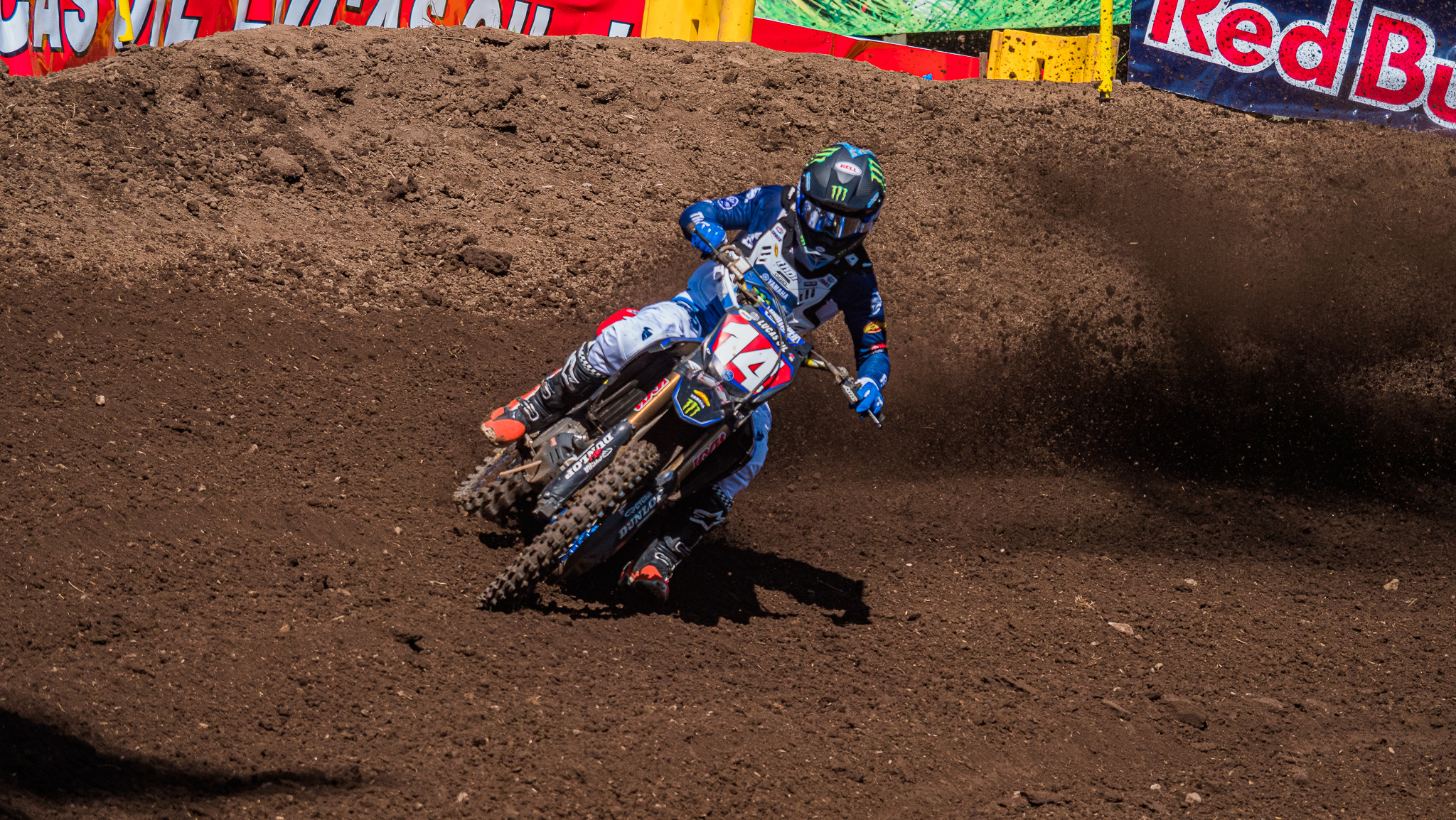
- Ferrandis in 2021
- Nationality: French
- Born: 31 May 1994 (age 32) Avignon, France

Motocross career
- Years active: 2011–2026
- Teams: •Rockstar Bud Racing Kawasaki (2011-2013); •CLS Kawasaki (2014-2016); •Star Racing Yamaha (2017-2023); •Phoenix Honda (2023-2025); •Troy Lee Designs Red Bull Ducati (2025-2026)
- Championships: •2019 AMA Supercross 250cc West; •2020 AMA Supercross 250cc West; •2020 AMA 250cc Motocross; •2021 AMA 450cc Motocross
- Wins: •MX2: 2; •AMA Supercross 250cc: 6; •AMA Motocross 250cc: 9; •AMA Motocross 450cc: 6

Dylan Ferrandis (born 31 May 1994) is a French retired motorcycle racer from Avignon, France. He competed in the AMA Supercross and AMA Motocross Championships from 2017 to 2026and was on the winning French team at the 2014 & 2018 Motocross des Nations. Ferrandis is a two-time AMA Supercross 250cc West champion, a 250cc & 450cc AMA Motocross champion.

Ferrandis was the 2017 250cc and the 2021 450cc AMA Supercross Rookie of the year.

== Career ==
Ferrandis grew up in France, before moving to the United States to pursue a professional motocross career.

=== 2019 ===
2019 was Ferrandis’ break out year, he captured his first 250cc West supercross title. He won three out of the ten rounds, as well as eight podium finishes.

In AMA Motocross, Ferrandis finished second to prospect Adam Cianciarulo. He won four rounds and finished on the podium seven times out of 12, but fell short by 21 points.

=== 2020 ===
For the Supercross season, Ferrandis was successful in defending his 250cc West title. He won three races and finished on the podium seven out of nine rounds.

Ferrandis won the 250 AMA Motocross championship which was shortened to nine rounds due to the COVID-19 pandemic. He won three rounds and finished on the podium eight times.

=== 2021 ===
2021 was Ferrandis' rookie year in both 450 Supercross and Motocross. He finished seventh in Supercross and won the 450 National Championship. He won six rounds and placed on the podium in all 12 races.

== AMA Supercross/Motocross Results ==
Year	Rnd 1	Rnd 2	Rnd 3	Rnd 4	Rnd 5	Rnd 6	Rnd 7	Rnd 8	Rnd 9	Rnd 10	Rnd 11	Rnd 12	Rnd 13	Rnd 14	Rnd 15	Rnd 16	Rnd 17	Average Finish	Podium Percent	Place
2017 250 SX-E	-	-	-	-	-	-	6	18	5	3	7	4	4	-	-	2	4	5.89	22%	5th
2017 250 MX	41	3	6	4	12	5	2	8	3	4	17	OUT	-	-	-	-	-	9.54	27%	6th
2018 250 SX-E	-	-	-	-	-	-	18	2	17	OUT	OUT	OUT	-	OUT	OUT	-	OUT	12.33	33%	22nd
2018 250 MX	OUT	OUT	OUT	4	2	1	3	10	4	1	9	7	-	-	-	-	-	4.56	44%	8th
~2019 250 SX-W	2	6	2	2	7	-	-	-	2	-	-	1	1	-	2	-	1	2.60	80%	1st
2019 250 MX	4	3	4	4	2	2	1	4	1	1	4	1	-	-	-	-	-	2.58	59%	2nd
2020 250 SX-W	2	12	1	2	1	1	-	-	-	-	-	-	-	2	2	-	4	3.00	75%	1st
2020 250 MX	1	2	2	4	2	1	1	2	3	-	-	-	-	-	-	-	-	2.00	88%	1st
2021 450 SX	7	2	12	6	9	8	22	11	11	22	8	7	5	11	7	4	4	9.17	6%	7th
2021 450 MX	1	2	1	1	1	3	3	2	1	2	2	1	-	-	-	-	-	1.60	100%	1st
2022 450 SX	16	6	3	4	12	6	9	7	4	19	OUT	OUT	OUT	OUT	OUT	OUT	OUT	8.60	10%	11th
2022 450 MX	OUT	OUT	OUT	OUT	OUT	OUT	OUT	OUT	7	13	OUT	OUT	-	-	-	-	-	10.00	-	24th
2023 450 SX	4	OUT	6	5	21	OUT	OUT	OUT	OUT	OUT	OUT	OUT	OUT	OUT	OUT	OUT	OUT	9.00	-	25th
2023 450 MX	3	2	5	4	2	3	3	4	3	6	11	-	-	-	-	-	-	4.18	55%	2nd
2024 450 SX	5	6	6	9	7	6	DNF	8	DNF	OUT	OUT	OUT	OUT	OUT	9	9	8	7.30	-	12th
2024 450 MX	4	6	9	7	5	12	6	6	4	14	DNF	-	-	-	-	-	-	7.30	-	7th
2025 450 SX	DNQ	9	16	11	OUT	8	8	12	8	13	5	10	7	5	7	7	10	9.07	-	7th
2025 450 MX	OUT	OUT	OUT	OUT	OUT	OUT	OUT	OUT	7	6	7	-	-	-	-	-	-	6.67	-	20th
2026 450 SX	9 ANA (California)	9 SDI (California)	11 ANA (California)	10 HOU (Texas)	9 GLE (Arizona)	9 SEA (Washington (state))	10 ARL (Texas)	DNF DAY (Florida)	OUT IND (Indiana)	OUT BIR (Alabama)	7 DET (Michigan)	10 STL (Missouri)	6 NAS (Tennessee)	9 CLE (Ohio)	9 PHI (Pennsylvania)	10 DEN (Colorado)	11 SLC (Utah)	9.21	-	11th
2026 450 MX	9 FOX (California)	4 HAN (California)	9 THU (Colorado)	17 HIG (Pennsylvania)	9 RED (Michigan)	7 SOU (Massachusetts)	7 SPR (Minnesota)	5 WAS (Washington (state))	6 UNA (New York (state))	12 BUD (Maryland)	21 IRN (Indiana)	-	-	-	-	-	-	9.63	-	7th
