= Ty Masterpool =

American motocross racer (born 2001)

- Nationality: American
- Born: 8 November 2001 (age 25); Paradise, Texas, U.S.
- Bike number: 44

Ty Masterpool (born November 8, 2001) is an American professional Motocross and Supercross racer. Masterpool has competed in the AMA Supercross and AMA Motocross Championships since 2019.

After a successful amateur career where he picked up six titles at the AMA Amateur National Motocross Championship, Masterpool turned professional in 2019 with the Monster Energy Star Racing Yamaha team. Following his split from the team in 2021, he raced for smaller teams before becoming a privateer ahead of the 2023 AMA National Motocross Championship.

As a privateer he achieved notable results on a 450 in 2023 and the following season he was picked up by the factory Monster Energy Pro Circuit Kawasaki team for the 2024 AMA National Motocross Championship. As part of this deal, he achieved his first professional overall win at the fourth round of the series.

Masterpool is the youngest of three motocross racing brothers. He has also raced professional motocross in the United States, whilst the eldest brother Jesse lost his life due to injuries sustained in a crash in 2010.

== Early life ==
Masterpool's parents come from an alpine snowboarding background, with his father being an Olympic coach and his mother being a successful competitor. The family own the 956 facility in his native Paradise, Texas, where Masterpool has trained at throughout his career.

== Career ==
=== Amateur career ===
Masterpool progressed through the amateur ranks in America, achieving several notable results at the AMA Amateur National Motocross Championship. He took his first title in 2013 in the 65 (7–11) class riding a KTM. By 2015, he was riding a Yamaha and a year later he would win his second AMA Amateur National title in the Mini Sr 2 (12–14) class. Moving brands again in 2017, Masterpool picked up two Supermini titles whilst riding a TM.

Following these results, Masterpool returned to Yamaha with backing from the Star Racing amateur programme for 2018. Moving up to race a 125cc machine, Masterpool picked up two further AMA Amateur National titles as well as winning the 125 All Star race that supported the eleventh round of the 2018 AMA National Motocross Championship.

=== Professional career ===
At the age of 17, Masterpool made his professional debut with the Monster Energy Yamalube Star Yamaha Racing in the 250 class of the 2019 AMA National Motocross Championship. He finished eleventh in the final standings, scoring in every race and recording several notable results such as a fourth in the first race at seventh round. Masterpool's 2020 AMA National Motocross Championship campaign was marred by a broken leg prior to the start of the season. He was able to return for the fourth round at RedBud, finishing in third in the first race at that event after taking the holeshot. A crash at the following round caused nerve damage in his leg, making Masterpool miss the rest of the season.

Monster Energy Star Yamaha decided to not renew Masterpool's contract for the 2021 season. Following this, he gained a sponsorship from the AEO Powersports team to ride a Gas Gas and make his professional supercross debut. Competing in the 250SX West class, he finished 18th in the final standings after missing the last two rounds due to tweaking his ankle whilst training. In the following outdoor season, Masterpool finished fifteenth in the final standings of the 250 class, with two seventh overall finishes being his high watermark. Due to injuries he did not compete often in 2022. After missing the entire supercross season due to a wrist injury, Masterpool competed in five rounds of the 2022 AMA National Motocross Championship before breaking his kneecap in a crash. Prior to this he notably finished sixth overall at RedBud.

Masterpool initially started the 2023 season as part of the BarX Suzuki team for his second attempt at supercross. After not qualifying for the first two rounds of the 250SX West class, the team and Masterpool parted ways. Following this, he arrived at the opening round of the 2023 AMA National Motocross Championship as a privateer on a Kawasaki. After finishing eighteenth overall at the opening round of the 250 class, Masterpool decided to move into the 450 class from the second round onwards due to budget constraints. He finishing sixth overall at his first two rounds after moving up. His fourth place in the second race at Thunder Valley is notable due to him passing factory riders Adam Cianciarulo, Cooper Webb and Dylan Ferrandis to ride in third place before Ferrandis got the better of him in the closing stages. His top-ten consistency saw him finish seventh in the final standings and qualify for the 2023 SuperMotocross World Championship finals in the 450 class.

Staying on a 450, Masterpool competed in the 2024 AMA Supercross Championship for the HBI Kawasaki team but missed the first six rounds due to recovering from an Appendectomy. After again planning to compete in the 450 class of the 2024 AMA National Motocross Championship, Masterpool's plans changed days before the start of the season. With injuries for Cameron McAdoo and Seth Hammaker, the factory Monster Energy Pro Circuit Kawasaki team signed Masterpool to ride in the 250 class as a fill-in. He placed in the top-ten across the first three rounds. At the fourth round at High Point, Masterpool finished second in the opening race before taking his first professional race win in the second race. This was enough to make him an overall round winner for the first time, which in turn was the 300th win for the Pro Circuit team. A further race win in the opening moto at the sixth round saw him pick up second overall, with additional top-ten finishes throughout the rest of the season resulting in fifth in the final standings. After qualifying for the finals of the 2024 SuperMotocross World Championship, Masterpool signed to continue with the Pro Circuit Kawasaki team for 2025.

Initially scheduled to compete in the 250SX East class, Masterpool was moved to the 250SX West class of the 2025 AMA Supercross Championship due to injuries for the teams other riders. At the first event he competed in, Masterpool crashed and broke two fingers, ending his supercross campaign. Outdoor, Masterpool was unable to reproduce his race winning form of the previous season, finishing 16th in the final standings of the 2025 AMA National Motocross Championship. Another hand injury in the run up to the sixth round saw him on the side-lines for the following four mid-season events. Masterpool ended the season strong in the 2025 SuperMotocross World Championship, finishing sixth at the end of the three rounds, despite having to come through the LCQ race in each one. Masterpool made two appearances in the 450SX class of the 2026 AMA Supercross Championship, finishing eighteenth in the second of these and scoring four points.

== Honours ==
AMA Amateur National Motocross Championship

- 125cc (12–17) B/C: 2018 (gold)
- Schoolboy 1 (12–17) B/C: 2018 (gold)
- Supermini 1 (12–15): 2017 (gold)
- Supermini 2 (13–16): 2017 (gold)
- Mini Sr 2 (12–14): 2016 (gold)
- 65cc (7–11): 2013 (gold)
- 65cc (10–11) Limited: 2013 (silver)

== Career statistics ==
=== AMA Supercross Championship ===
==== By season ====
Season	Class	Number	Motorcycle	Team	Overall Wins	Overall Podium	Pts	Plcd
2021	250SX West	75	Gas Gas	AEO Powersports Gas Gas	0	0	38	18th
2023	250SX West	81	Suzuki	BarX Suzuki	0	0	0	N/A
2024	450SX	29	Kawasaki	HBI Racing Kawasaki	0	0	19	29th
2025	250SX West	26	Kawasaki	Monster Energy Pro Circuit Kawasaki	0	0	1	38th
2026	450SX	44	Yamaha		0	0	4	33rd
2026	450SX	44	Yamaha	Gizmo Racing Yamaha	0	0	4	33rd
Total					0	0	62	

=== AMA National Motocross Championship ===
==== By season ====
Season	Class	Number	Motorcycle	Team	Races	Race Wins	Overall Wins	Race Top-3	Overall Podium	Pts	Plcd
2019	250	936	Yamaha	Monster Energy Yamalube Star Yamaha Racing	24	0	0	0	0	206	11th
2020	250	41	Yamaha	Monster Energy Yamalube Star Yamaha Racing	4	0	0	1	0	54	19th
2021	250	75	Gas Gas	AEO Powersports Gas Gas	22	0	0	0	0	166	15th
2022	250	42	KTM	AEO Powersports KTM Racing	7	0	0	0	0	53	23rd
2023	250	81	Kawasaki	Sports Clips Beachview Treatment Airline Vacuum	2	0	0	0	0	7	39th
2023	450	81	Kawasaki	Sports Clips Beachview Treatment Airline Vacuum	18	0	0	0	0	242	7th
2024	250	29	Kawasaki	Monster Energy Pro Circuit Kawasaki	22	2	1	3	2	316	5th
2025	250	26	Kawasaki	Monster Energy Pro Circuit Kawasaki	14	0	0	0	0	160	16th
Total					113	2	1	4	2	1204	
