= Garrett Marchbanks =

American motocross racer (born 2001)

- Nationality: American
- Born: 26 August 2001 (age 25); Coalville, Utah, U.S.
- Current team: Monster Energy Kawasaki
- Bike number: 36

Garrett Marchbanks (born 26 August 2001) is an American professional Motocross and Supercross racer. Marchbanks has competed professionally in the AMA Supercross Championship and AMA Motocross Championship since his outdoor debut in 2018.

Marchbanks was the winner of the Daytona round of the 2020 AMA Supercross Championship in the 250SX East class, his only supercross victory to date.

During his career, Marchbanks has competed on both 250cc and 450cc motorcycles. His best outdoor results to date came in the 2025 AMA National Motocross Championship, where he finished third in the final standings of the 250 class with one overall podium to his name.

== Career ==
=== Amateur career ===
Marchbanks worked his way up through the ranks of the American amateur system, winning eight individual titles at the AMA Amateur National Motocross Championship between 2010 and 2017. Following his first title on a 65cc motorcycle, Marchbanks was picked up by the Team Green Kawasaki amateur team, staying with them for the rest of his amateur career. In 2014, he travelled to Belgium to compete in the FIM Motocross Junior World Championship, finishing 16th overall in the 85 class. During his run of amateur title, he was named 2014 AMA Youth Motocross Racer of the Year and 2017 AMA Amateur Motocross Racer of the Year.

=== Pro career ===
Monster Energy Pro Circuit Kawasaki

After being supported by Kawasaki for the majority of his amateur career, Marchbanks made his professional debut for the Monster Energy Pro Circuit Kawasaki team in the 2018 AMA National Motocross Championship. Marchbanks found his feet in the 250 class quickly, finishing in the top-ten overall in the first three rounds, which included a sixth place race finish at the opening round. A crash at the fourth round saw him on the side-lines for two weeks with a strained MCL in his left knee. Upon returning at Red Bud, another crash resulted in an ankle injury that required surgery, ending his debut season prematurely. Marchbanks made his professional supercross debut in the 250SX West class of the 2019 AMA Supercross Championship, recording his first podium at the fifth round in San Diego, before ending the series in tenth. For the second year running, his outdoor season was impacted by the results of a crash at the fourth round, causing him to miss the following three events. Completing the remainder of the season, he finished 14th in the final standings.

During the COVID-19-impacted 2020 AMA Supercross Championship, Marchbanks competed in the 250SX East class. After strong results in the first three rounds, before taking his first professional win at the fourth round, held at the historic Daytona venue. Once the series returned from a pandemic-enforced break, Marchbanks took a podium at the first of the Salt Lake City events but would then injure his knee two rounds later. Despite missing the final two rounds, Marchbanks would end the championship in fourth.

ClubMX Yamaha

Following his injury, Marchbanks was informed he would not be retained by the Pro Circuit Kawasaki team and after a period on the sidelines, signed for the ClubMX Yamaha team for 2021. Returning to the 250SX West class, he started the 2021 AMA Supercross Championship with a podium finish at the opening round. After showing consistency over the following rounds, he finished sixth in the final standings. In the following outdoor season, Marchbanks started strongly with three top-ten overall finishes at the opening three rounds. After his form took a downturn in the second half of the season, he was diagnosed with Addison's disease, missing the final three rounds. The 2022 AMA Supercross Championship saw Marchbanks finish eighth in the final standings of the 250SX West class, with three fourth places as his best results. Two years after his win at Daytona, he made his 450SX class debut in the event, held on a weekend when the 250SX West class was not competing. Following the supercross season, Marchbanks moved up to a 450 for the full 2022 AMA National Motocross Championship, finishing twelfth in the final standings with a best overall result of ninth.

The recovery period from a pre-season wrist injury caused Marchbanks to miss the full 2023 AMA Supercross Championship. Returning for the 2023 AMA National Motocross Championship, Marchbanks started the season in the 250 class but from round three onwards returned to the 450 class he had competed in the previous season. This move saw him finish every race inside the top-ten, with a second place behind Jett Lawrence in the first race at the fourth round being his first outdoor top-three finish. His consistency on the 450 would see him finish sixth in the final standings. Marchbanks carried strong form into the 2024 AMA Supercross Championship, scoring two podiums in San Francisco and San Diego. Later in the season, at the Nashville round, he sustained a concussion and broken thumb during his heat race which forced him out of the remaining two rounds.

Return to Pro Circuit Kawasaki

After returning with the ClubMX team for three rounds of the 2024 AMA National Motocross Championship in the 450 class mid season, Marchbanks returned to the Monster Energy Pro Circuit Kawasaki team for the final three rounds. On his return to the team, he finished fourth overall at Unadilla. Marchbanks made his full-time return to the team in the 250SX West class of the 2025 AMA Supercross Championship, scoring two podiums in Seattle and Denver, before finishing fifth in the final standings. He would follow this up by having his best outdoor season to date, when he finished third in the final standings of the 2025 AMA National Motocross Championship, securing his first outdoor podium along the way at the Washougal round.

Monster Energy Kawasaki

Following the conclusion of the 2025 SuperMotocross World Championship, it was announced that Marchbanks would move up to compete on a 450 full-time for the 2026 season, forming part of the factory Monster Energy Kawasaki team in the class. He finished in 14th in the final standings in the 450SX class of the 2026 AMA Supercross Championship, steadily improving as the season went on, with six top-ten finishes in the second half of the season. Marchbanks had a consistent outdoor season in the 2026 AMA National Motocross Championship, securing six top-six overall finishes and one top-three race finish, on his way to sixth in the 450 standings. At the end of the season, he also finished sixth overall in the three round 2026 SuperMotocross World Championship playoff standings.

== Honours ==
AMA Motocross Championship

- 250: 2025 (bronze)

AMA Amateur National Motocross Championship

- 250B: 2017 (gold)
- Schoolboy 2 (12–17) B/C: 2017 (gold)
- Supermini 1 (12–15): 2015 (gold)
- Supermini 2 (13–16): 2015 (gold)
- Mini Sr.1 (12–13): 2014 (gold)
- Mini Sr.2 (12–14): 2014 (gold)
- 85 (9–11): 2013 (gold)
- 85 (9–11) Limited: 2013 (silver)
- 85 (9–11) Stock: 2012 (silver)
- 85 (9–11) Modified: 2012 (bronze)
- 65 (7–9) Stock: 2011 (gold)
- 65 (7–11) Modified: 2011 (silver)

Monster Energy Cup

- All-Stars: 2016 (bronze)
- Supermini: 2014 (silver)

== Career statistics ==
=== AMA Supercross Championship ===
==== By season ====
Season	Class	Number	Motorcycle	Team	Overall Wins	Overall Podium	Pts	Plcd
2019	250SX West	61	Kawasaki	Monster Energy Pro Circuit Kawasaki	0	1	113	10th
2020	250SX East	36	Kawasaki	Monster Energy Pro Circuit Kawasaki	1	2	119	4th
2021	250SX West	48	Yamaha	ClubMX	0	1	137	6th
2022	250SX West	35	Yamaha	Muc-Off FXR ClubMX Yamaha	0	0	117	8th
2024	250SX West	26	Yamaha	Muc-Off FXR ClubMX Yamaha	0	2	121	6th
2025	250SX West	36	Kawasaki	Monster Energy Pro Circuit Kawasaki	0	2	145	5th
2026	450SX	36	Kawasaki	Monster Energy Kawasaki	0	0	142	14th
Total					1	8	894	

=== AMA National Motocross Championship ===
==== By season ====
Season	Class	Number	Motorcycle	Team	Races	Race Wins	Overall Wins	Race Top-3	Overall Podium	Pts	Plcd
2018	250	182	Kawasaki	Monster Energy Pro Circuit Kawasaki	9	0	0	0	0	87	19th
2019	250	61	Kawasaki	Monster Energy Pro Circuit Kawasaki	16	0	0	0	0	132	14th
2021	250	48	Yamaha	ClubMX	18	0	0	0	0	146	16th
2022	450	35	Yamaha	Muc-Off FXR ClubMX Yamaha	23	0	0	0	0	172	12th
2023	250	36	Yamaha	Muc-Off FXR ClubMX Yamaha	4	0	0	0	0	15	33rd
2023	450	36	Yamaha	Muc-Off FXR ClubMX Yamaha	18	0	0	1	0	255	6th
2024	450	26	Yamaha	Muc-Off FXR ClubMX Yamaha	6	0	0	0	0	50	22nd
2024	250	26	Kawasaki	Monster Energy Pro Circuit Kawasaki	5	0	0	0	0	51	23rd
2025	250	36	Kawasaki	Monster Energy Pro Circuit Kawasaki	22	0	0	2	1	352	3rd
2026	450	36	Kawasaki	Monster Energy Kawasaki	21	0	0	1	0	296	6th
Total					142	0	0	4	1	1556	
