= Jordon Smith =

American motocross racer (born 1996)

- Nationality: American
- Born: February 5, 1996 (age 30) Belmont, North Carolina, U.S.

Motocross career
- Years active: 2015–present
- Teams: •GEICO Honda (2015–2016); •TLD KTM (2017–2019); •Pro Circuit Kawasaki (2020–2021); •Fire Power Honda (2022); •Monster Energy Star Racing Yamaha (2023–2024); •Triumph Factory Racing Team (2024–present)
- Wins: •AMA 250cc Supercross: 5

Jordon Smith (born February 5, 1996) is an American professional Motocross and Supercross racer. Smith has competed professionally in the AMA Supercross Championship and AMA Motocross Championship since 2015.

During the 2025 AMA Supercross Championship, Smith took Triumph's first professional supercross win at the Glendale round.

In 2018, Smith was the runner-up in the AMA Supercross Championship in the 250SX East class. Despite having parts of his career impacted by injuries, Smith has five professional supercross wins.

== Career ==
=== Amateur career ===
Smith started riding off-road at the age of four and over the following decade managed to record notable results as he moved up through the amateur ranks. As a Suzuki-mounted rider from 2008 to 2012, Smith picked up four second place class finishes at the AMA Amateur National Motocross Championship as well as a win in the Schoolboy 1 class. After being acknowledged as being one of the fastest up-and-coming young riders in America, Smith was then signed by the GEICO Honda in 2013 whilst still in the amateur ranks.

During 2013, Smith was able to win the 250 B Limited title at the AMA Amateur Nationals and finish third in the Amateur All-Stars race at the Monster Energy Cup exhibition supercross race. Injuries sustained at the end of the 2013 season hampered his preparations for his final year as an amateur in 2014. Just before his final AMA Amateur Nationals, Smith then suffered a further injury, tearing all the ligaments in his ankle. Despite this, he did ride in the event with limited success but later in the year he managed to round off his amateur career with fourth in the Amateur All-Stars at Monster Energy Cup.

=== Professional career ===
Smith began the 2015 season by making his professional supercross debut in the 250SX East class of the AMA Supercross Championship. A pre-season injury saw him miss the opening rounds, with a fourth place at the Indianapolis round proving he had the speed to run at the front despite finishing twentieth in the final standings. Smith also featured in the top-ten several times during his debut AMA National Motocross Championship season in 2015, with a sixth overall at the third round proving his speed in the class. He showed similar promise in the 2016 AMA Supercross Championship as he moved to the 250SX West class, finishing third at the second round to achieve his first professional podium. After finishing eighth overall in supercross, Smith started the AMA Motocross season on a similarly strong point, with second in race one at the opening round. Several non finishes and missed rounds mid-season saw him finish sixteenth in the final standings.

Smith left GEICO Honda for Troy Lee Designs KTM ahead of the 2017 season. This move saw him take his best results to that point in supercross, finishing second at the opening round of the 250SX East class. At the sixth round in Detroit, Smith took his first professional supercross win, backing it up with a second win at the following round in St. Louis. Going into the final round, Smith was leading the points standings by a single point over Zach Osborne and Joey Savatgy. A crash early in the fine brought an end to his title hopes and not finishing the event saw him drop to fourth in the overall standings. After missing the entire 2017 motocross season, Smith performed strongly during the 2018 AMA Supercross Championship. Six podium appearances, including a win in Daytona saw Smith finish runner-up to Osborne in the 250SX East Class. Following this, he competed in a full AMA Motocross season in the 250 class, recording two third place race finishes and ending the year in tenth overall.

Smith had two second places in the opening three rounds of the 2019 AMA Supercross Championship in the 250SX East class. At the fourth round he picked up a wrist injury that forced him to miss the remaining rounds of supercross and cause him to line up for only the first three rounds of motocross. Ahead of the 2020 season, Smith signed for the Pro Circuit Kawasaki team. However, a torn ACL at the fourth round of the 250SX East class of the 2020 AMA Supercross Championship saw him miss the rest of 2020. A further injury before the start of the 2021 supercross season saw him start the campaign with limited preparation. He crashed out of second at the opening round, sustained an injury at the second round which required 20 stitches and then crashed out of the fifth round resulting in a hematoma on his sternum.

After the tough period at Pro Circuit Kawasaki, Smith moved to the Fire Power Honda team for the 2022 season. Aboard the Honda, Smith was able to complete the full 250SX East season and finish sixth in the final standings. Following this, he was picked up by the Monster Energy Star Racing Yamaha team for the 2023 supercross and motocross seasons. This move saw a return to form for Smith in supercross, finishing the 2023 AMA Supercross Championship in fourth in the 250SX East class after picking up five podium finished, including a second in Arlington. Following this, Smith made his first appearance in the AMA National Motocross Championship for four years. A wrist injury after the fourth round curtailed his motocross season.

Smith made a strong start to the 2024 AMA Supercross Championship, finishing second at the opening round and winning the second round in the mud at San Francisco to take the championship leader's red plate. He again finished on the podium with third at the following round, but lost the championship lead after round four. Smith finished third twice more on his way to finishing third in the final standings of the 250SX West class behind RJ Hampshire and Levi Kitchen. Following this, Smith finished ninth in the final standings of the 250 class in the 2024 AMA National Motocross Championship, picking up a third in the opening race at the final round. He joined the Triumph Factory Racing Team for 2025 SuperMotocross World Championship. Racing in the 250SX West class of the 2025 AMA Supercross Championship, Smith finished on the podium in his debut ride for the manufacturer, before taking Triumph's first professional supercross win in Glendale, Arizona. An injury picked up at the following round hampered his title challenge and he eventually finished eighth in the standings. Smith returned for the 2025 AMA National Motocross Championship, where he finished ninth in the final standings, with a sixth at the second round being his best overall finish of the season. In the season ending SuperMotocross playoff rounds, Smith finished seventh in the final standings.

Sticking with the Triumph factory team, Smith made the full-time switch to the 450 class for 2026, becoming one of the first riders to pilot the manufacturer's new 450cc motorcycle. A pre-season injury meant that Smith did not start his 2026 AMA Supercross Championship campaign until the seventh round in Arlington, Texas. Throughout the rest of the season, he found his feet in the category, scoring one top-ten main event finish and ending the championship in nineteenth. Smith made his outdoor 450 debut in the 2026 AMA National Motocross Championship, where he put in a consistent campaign to finish eleventh in the final standings, with eighth overall at Washougal being the high point. In the season ending SuperMotocross playoff rounds, Smith put in three top-ten finishes to come away eighth in the final standings.

== Honours ==
AMA Supercross Championship

- 250SX East: 2018 (silver)
- 250SX West: 2024 (bronze)

Monster Energy Cup

- Amateur All-Stars: 2013 (bronze)

AMA Amateur National Motocross Championship

- 250B Limited: 2013 (gold)
- Schoolboy 1 (12-16) B/C: 2012 (gold)
- Super Mini 1 (12-15): 2011 (silver)
- Super Mini 2 (13-16): 2011 (silver)
- 85 (12-14) Modified: 2010 (silver)
- 85 (12-14) Stock: 2010 (silver)

== AMA Supercross/Motocross results ==
| Year | Rnd 1 | Rnd 2 | Rnd 3 | Rnd 4 | Rnd 5 | Rnd 6 | Rnd 7 | Rnd 8 | Rnd 9 | Rnd 10 | Rnd 11 | Rnd 12 | Rnd 13 | Rnd 14 | Rnd 15 | Rnd 16 | Rnd 17 | Average Finish | Podium Percent | Place |
|---|---|---|---|---|---|---|---|---|---|---|---|---|---|---|---|---|---|---|---|---|
| 2017 250 SX-E | - | - | - | - | - | - | 2 | 5 | 7 | 4 | 3 | 1 | 1 | - | - | 3 | DNF | 3.25 | 63% | 4th |
| 2018 250 SX-E | - | - | - | - | - | - | 6 | 6 | 3 | 1 | 3 | 4 | - | 3 | 2 | - | 2 | 3.33 | 66% | 2nd |
| ~2024 250 SX-W | 2 | 1 | 3 | 5 | - | 4 | - | - | - | - | 14 | 3 | - | 4 | - | 5 | 3 | 4.40 | 50% | 3rd |
| 2025 250 SX-W | 3 | 2 | 4 | 1 | - | - | 22 | - | OUT | - | 12 | - | 9 | - | - | 4 | OUT | 7.15 | 38% | 6th |
| 2025 250 MX | 19 | 6 | 12 | 14 | 10 | 18 | 10 | 12 | 12 | 7 | 15 | - | - | - | - | - | - | 12.27 | - | 9th |
| 2026 450 SX | OUT | OUT | OUT | OUT | OUT | OUT | 19 | 17 | 11 | 9 | 11 | 17 | 22 | 14 | 18 | 14 | 22 | 14.90 | - | 19th |
| 2026 450 MX | 20 FOX (California) | 18 HAN (California) | 12 THU (Colorado) | 9 HIG (Pennsylvania) | 11 RED (Michigan) | 10 SOU (Massachusetts) | 10 SPR (Minnesota) | 8 WAS (Washington (state)) | 17 UNA (New York (state)) | 19 BUD (Maryland) | 12 IRN (Indiana) | - | - | - | - | - | - | 13.27 | - | 11th |
