= Seth Hammaker =

American motocross racer (born 2000)

- Nationality: (United States) American
- Born: 29 September 2000 (age 26) Bainbridge, Pennsylvania, U.S.

Motocross career
- Years active: 2021-Present
- Teams: •Monster Energy Pro Circuit Kawasaki (2021-Present)
- Wins: •250cc AMA Supercross: 4; •250cc AMA Motocross: 1

Seth Hammaker (born 29 September 2000) is an American professional Motocross and Supercross racer. Hammaker is a four-time main event winner in the AMA Supercross Championship.

Hammaker has been racing professionally in the AMA Supercross Championship and AMA Motocross Championship. For his entire career to date, he has competed for the Monster Energy Pro Circuit Kawasaki team in the 250 classes. Hammaker finished runner-up in the 250SX East class of the 2025 and 2026 AMA Supercross Championship.

Hammaker took his first professional supercross win at Arlington in the 2021 season, in what was only his third race since debuting. After facing several stints on the side lines due to injury, he would not win again until the 2025 season.

He would have to wait until the opening round of the 2026 AMA National Motocross Championship to take his first outdoor win.

== Career ==
=== Amateur career ===
Hammaker worked his way up through the ranks of the American amateur system, achieving his first notable results in the 2016 AMA Amateur National Motocross Championship, where he won the Super Mini 1 title and finished second in the Super Mini 2 class. A top-ten finish at the Monster Energy Cup later that year saw Hammaker join the Team Green Kawasaki amateur programme.

After picking up a second in the 250 B class at the Amateur Nationals in 2017, Hammaker returned to the Monster Energy Cup, where he was able to win the Amateur All-Stars class. He achieved another second place at the Amateur Nationals in 2018, this time in the Open Pro Sport class. Returning to defend his title at the Monster Energy Cup, Hammaker finished in fourth overall in the Amateur All-Stars class.

=== 250 career ===
Hammaker's final year as an amateur was cut short due to illness and following the COVID-19 pandemic, he made his professional debut for the Monster Energy Pro Circuit Kawasaki team in the 2021 AMA Supercross Championship. Riding in the 250SX West class, Hammaker finished sixth on his debut in Orlando, before taking his first professional supercross win in Arlington. After winning in only his third professional start, Hammaker would go on to secure two third places as his best results over the remaining rounds, to end the championship in fourth overall. These results would see Hammaker named the AMA Supercross Rookie of the Year for the 2021 season. Following this, he was only able to compete at three rounds in his first professional motocross season, missing the remaining rounds with a return of his previous illnesses being a factor.

Hammaker continued his supercross success into the start of the 2022 AMA Supercross Championship, finishing second and third at the opening two rounds of the 250SX West class. Following the opening two rounds, he had a practice crash that ended his supercross season due to injuries that included a spleen laceration and compression fractures in two vertebrae. Hammaker was able to return for the 2022 AMA National Motocross Championship, where he was able to record eight top-ten overall finishes and end the championship in seventh in the final standings. After originally being slated to ride in the 250SX East class of the 2023 AMA Supercross Championship, Hammaker picked up a wrist injury pre-season that saw him ruled out for the entire supercross season. He was able to return for the second half of the 2023 AMA National Motocross Championship, securing five top-ten overall finishes across the seven rounds he raced.

After not finishing the opening round of the 2024 AMA Supercross Championship, Hammaker was able to finish third in the Daytona and Birmingham rounds. Eventually finishing tenth in the 250SX East class, he would miss the entire 2024 AMA National Motocross Championship due to a shoulder injury obtained prior to the start of the championship. Making his comeback in the 250SX East class of the 2025 AMA Supercross Championship, Hammaker was able to finish third at Daytona for the second year running, before taking his second professional supercross win in Indianapolis the following weekend. Consistent results across the next three rounds saw him tie for the championship lead with RJ Hampshire, before taking a second season win at East Rutherford to take sole lead. He went into the final round one point behind Tom Vialle after the latter had gained the lead at the penultimate event. Hammaker was involved in a crash with fellow championship contender Hampshire, resulting in him finishing second in the final standings to Vialle by three points. In the summer of 2025, Hammaker was able to record his first three top-three race finishes during the 2025 AMA National Motocross Championship, although an overall podium eluded him throughout as he finished the series in seventh. He put together some of his best riding of the year in the season-ending SuperMotocross playoff rounds, finishing second overall in all three events to end as runner-up in the 250SMX class.

Hammaker again tackled the 250SX East class for the 2026 AMA Supercross Championship, winning the second round of the series at the historic Daytona venue. For the remainder of the series, Hammaker would battle with Cole Davies at the front of the field, podiuming in the next four consecutive rounds but ultimately unable to better the New Zealander. A final podium at the penultimate round would cement his place as runner-up in the championship to Davies. Hammaker took his first outdoor overall win at the opening round of the 2026 AMA National Motocross Championship, backing it up with third overall at the second round. Whilst still being in championship contention, Hammaker dislocated shoulder and torn labrum in a crash at the fourth round, ending his season.

== Honours ==
SuperMotocross World Championship

- 250SMX: 2025 (silver)

AMA Supercross Championship

- 250SX East: 2025 & 2026 (silver)
- AMA Supercross Rookie of the Year: 2021 (gold)

AMA Amateur National Motocross Championship

- Open Pro Sport: 2018 (silver)
- 250 B: 2017 (silver)
- Super Mini 1 (12-15): 2016 (gold)
- Super Mini 2 (13-16): 2016 (silver)

Monster Energy Cup

- All-Stars: 2017 (gold)

== AMA Supercross/Motocross Results ==
Year	Rnd 1	Rnd 2	Rnd 3	Rnd 4	Rnd 5	Rnd 6	Rnd 7	Rnd 8	Rnd 9	Rnd 10	Rnd 11	Rnd 12	Rnd 13	Rnd 14	Rnd 15	Rnd 16	Rnd 17	Average Finish	Podium Percent	Place
2024 250 SX-E	-	-	-	-	DNF	-	4	3	3	9	-	-	DNF	OUT	OUT	-	OUT	4.75	50%	10th
2025 250 SX-E	-	-	-	-	4	17	-	3	1	4	-	9	4	1	5	-	4	5.20	30%	2nd
2025 250 MX	7	15	OUT	7	8	9	34	4	10	4	13	-	-	-	-	-	-	11.10	-	7th
2026 250 SX-E	-	-	-	-	-	-	4 ARL (Texas)	1 DAY (Florida)	3 IND (Indiana)	3 BIR (Alabama)	2 DET (Michigan)	3 STL (Missouri)	5 NAS (Tennessee)	4 CLE (Ohio)	3 PHI (Pennsylvania)	-	DNF SLC (Utah)	3.11	60%	2nd
2026 250 MX	1 FOX (California)	3 HAN (California)	7 THU (Colorado)	13 HIG (Pennsylvania)	OUT RED (Michigan)	OUT SOU (Massachusetts)	OUT SPR (Minnesota)	OUT WAS (Washington (state))	OUT UNA (New York (state))	OUT BUD (Maryland)	OUT IRN (Indiana)	-	-	-	-	-	-	6.00	50%	18th
