= RJ Hampshire =

American motocross racer (born 1996)

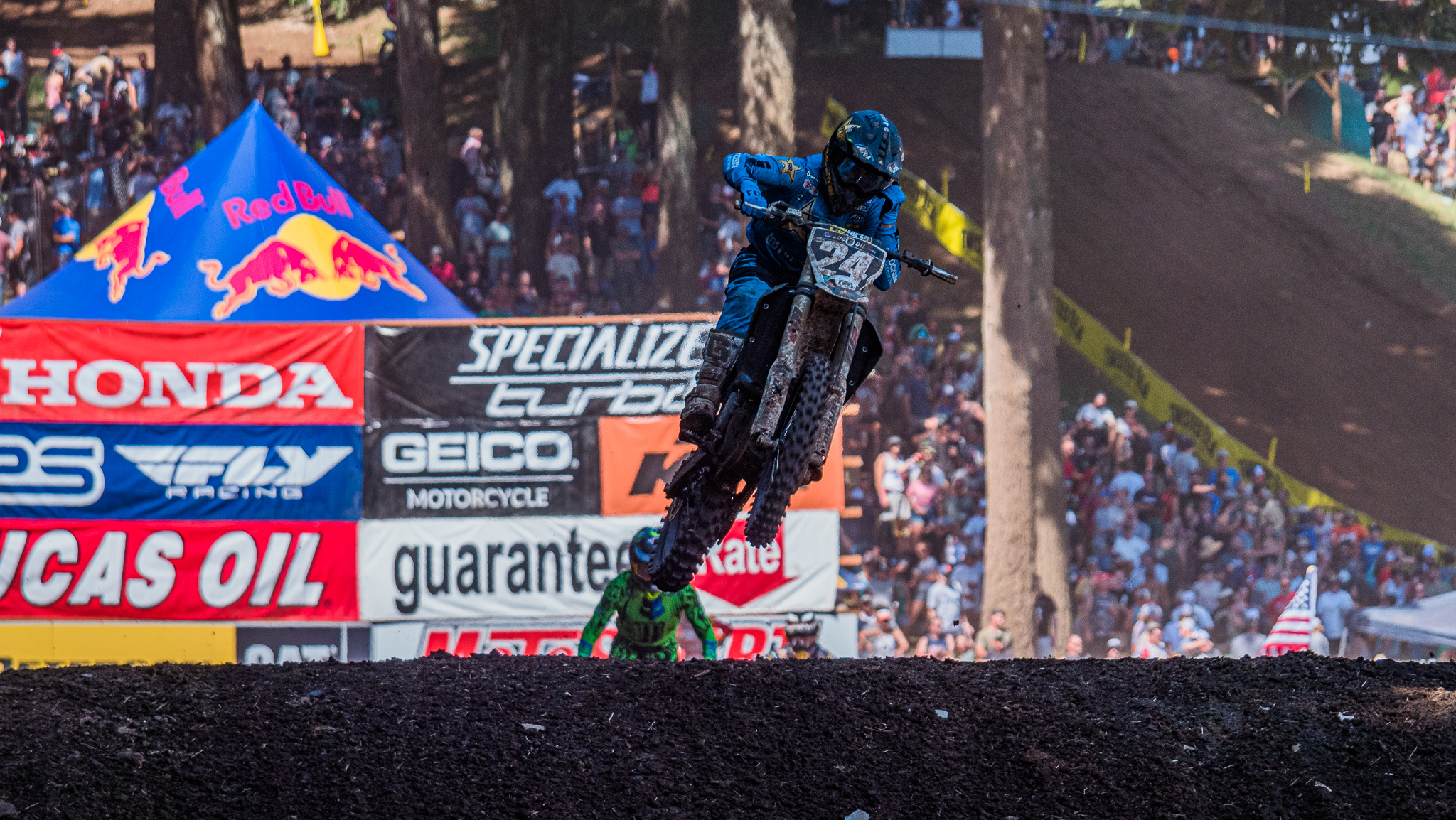
- RJ in 2021
- Nationality: American
- Born: 26 January 1996 (age 30) Hudson, Florida

Motocross career
- Years active: 2014-Present
- Teams: •Geico Honda (2013-2019); •Rockstar Energy Factory Husqvarna Racing (2020-2026); •Troy Lee Designs Red Bull Ducati (2026-Present)
- Championships: •2024 AMA Supercross 250cc West
- Wins: •MX2: 1; •AMA 250cc Motocross: 4; •AMA 250cc Supercross: 6

RJ Hampshire (born 26 January 1996) is an American professional Motocross and Supercross racer. Hampshire has ridden professionally in the AMA Supercross Championship and the AMA Motocross Championship since 2014. He was the 2024 AMA Supercross 250cc West Champion.

Hampshire has represented his country twice at the Motocross des Nations and has competed in the factory teams of Honda and Husqvarna previously. From the 2027 season, Hampshire will compete for the Troy Lee Designs Red Bull Ducati team, his third different factory squad.

Hampshire has one Grand Prix win in the FIM Motocross World Championship which he achieved at the 2017 MXGP of USA as a wildcard in the MX2 class.

== Personal life ==
Hampshire was born and raised in Hudson, Florida to parents Ricky and Robin. He has one sister. He grew up playing baseball but gave that up to pursue racing. He turned pro in 2014. Hampshire married wife Ashley (Murphy) in 2018. They welcomed daughters Ivy (2019) and Navy (2022). He continues to live and train in Florida.

== Career ==
=== Amateur career ===
Hampshire worked his way up the ranks of the American amateur scene, winning the Amateur All-Stars race at the 2013 Monster Energy Cup supercross. Following this, he was signed by the Amsoil Factory Connection Honda team for 2014, where he won two titles at the AMA Amateur National Motocross Championship.

=== Professional career ===
==== 2014 ====
Following his amateur successes, Hampshire was given the opportunity to race the final three rounds of the 2014 AMA National Motocross Championship in the 250 class for the factory GEICO Honda team. At the final round in Utah, Hampshire was able to finish tenth overall, with a best result of ninth in the opening race.

==== 2015 ====
Hampshire made his professional Supercross debut in the 2015 AMA Supercross Championship by competing in the 250SX East class. He was an immediate top-ten finisher in the opening round before recording his first podium in Indianapolis, on his way to fifth in the final standings for the class. Hampshire rode the entire 2015 AMA National Motocross season in the 250 class, finishing tenth in the final standings, with fourth overall at the final round being his best result.

==== 2016 ====
Hampshire finished eighth in the 250SX East class standings in 2016, with a best finish of fourth. This was coupled with finishing eleventh in the 250 class of that season's AMA National Motocross Championship.

==== 2017 ====
Hampshire's 2017 supercross season was curtailed after the third round due to fracturing his tibia and fibula in a crash. This caused him to also miss the opening three rounds of that season's AMA Motocross Championship but he was ultimately able to pick up his first two top three race finishes across the later season. In addition to this, Hampshire competed in the MX2 class of the MXGP of USA in his native Florida as a wildcard. He was able to pull off a breakout ride, winning both races and ultimately taking the Grand Prix overall.

==== 2018 ====
Hampshire's supercross season would be cut short after the third round for the second season running in 2018. He recovered sufficiently from a fractured back to line up for the entire AMA Motocross Championship for that season, picking up his first professional motocross race and overall wins at the penultimate round.

==== 2019 ====
This would be the final year in Hampshire's stint as a Honda rider. Competing in the 250SX West class for the first time, he managed to race a full supercross season finishing fourth overall and getting two podiums. He was able to match this final position in the 2019 AMA National Motocross Championship, picking up three top-three race finishes along the way but missing out on a podium finish.

==== 2020 ====
After five and a half years aboard Honda motorcycles, Hampshire signed for the Husqvarna's factory team for the 2020 season. This switch saw Hampshire pick up two podium finishes across the first four rounds of the 2020 AMA Supercross Championship in the 250SX East class. After missing the remaining supercross rounds due to surgery on his knee, Hampshire began the 2020 AMA National Motocross Championship with second overall in the 250 class at the opening round. After winning a race at the second round, he would go on to take the overall win three rounds later in Red Bud. After breaking his hand at the penultimate round, he eventually finished seventh in the final standings.

==== 2021 ====
Hampshire's 2021 AMA Supercross Championship was cut short after just two rounds due to injury. He was able to return in time for the AMA Motocross Championship, finishing fourth in the final standings with three overall podiums including an overall win again at Red Bud.

==== 2022 ====
Hampshire was one of the main protagonists of the 250SX East class during the 2022 AMA Supercross Championship, finishing runner-up in the final standings and recording his first professional supercross win in St Louis. Despite missing the third round of the 2022 AMA National Motocross Championship due to injury, Hampshire was able to bounce back by winning the Budds Creek round and finishing fifth in the final standings.

==== 2023 ====
For the 2023 AMA Supercross Championship, he opted to race in the 250SX West class for only the second time. This resulted in the second professional supercross win of his career in Denver and seven other podiums as be again finished runner-up in the series to Jett Lawrence. In addition to this, Hampshire made his debut in the 450SX class at Daytona, finishing eighth. At the 2023 AMA National Motocross Championship, Hampshire was able to win the opening race of the season, pick up a second race win at round 4 and take two overall podiums before missing the final two rounds of the championship. Following this, Hampshire made his debut at the Motocross des Nations for the US in the MX2 class, forming part of the team that would go on to finish eighth.

==== 2024 ====
Staying in the 250SX West class, Hampshire was able to win the opening round of the 2024 AMA Supercross Championship. After finishing ninth in the mud at the second round he lost the championship lead. At round five in Glendale, Arizona Hampshire took his second win of the season and with a second at the following round he moved up to second in the standings behind Levi Kitchen. A third win came at Nashville and saw him return to the championship lead after a bad night for Kitchen. After finishing third behind Kitchen at the penultimate round, the pair went into the final level on points making it a straight shootout. Hampshire was able to finish second in the final three places ahead of Kitchen, ultimately becoming champion in the 250SX West class, his first title in his ten year professional career. At the press day before the opening round of the 2024 AMA National Motocross Championship, Hampshire crashed and injured his wrist, which ruled him out of the championship until the penultimate round. Despite missing the majority of the season, Hampshire was able to finish on the bottom step of the podium at the final round.

==== 2025 ====
Hampshire had to have surgery on his injured wrist in the off season. The recovery period required for this meant that he missed out on the chance to defend his title in the 250SX West class. Riding in the 250SX East class instead, Hampshire had five trips to the podium, including his first win at the famous Daytona round. This consistency saw him in contention for the overall title in the final rounds of the series, eventually finishing third in the standings after an incident with Seth Hammaker at the season-ending event. Hampshire made his full-time debut in the 450 class during the 2025 AMA National Motocross Championship, with the opening round taking place just two weeks after further surgery to his wrist. Despite this, he surprised many with his strong performances in the class, getting stronger at the season progressed and scoring his first 450 class podium at the round at Ironman. After finishing fifth in the final standings, Hampshire backed it up with seventh overall in the 2025 SuperMotocross World Championship play off rounds. With two members of the original team getting injured at the final SuperMotocross round, Hampshire was drafted into the American team for the 2025 Motocross des Nations. Racing on home soil, the team finished second overall, with Hampshire finishing fourth in his qualifying race but crashing out of his second main race on the Sunday.

==== 2026 ====
Hampshire's indoor season was cut short after he fractured his foot in a training crash prior to the sixth round, resulting in him finishing 23rd in the 2026 AMA Supercross Championship standings. Following his recovery, he returned for the 2026 AMA National Motocross Championship, where he had similarly impressive results as the previous year. Finishing all but one race in the top-ten and ending the championship with a second overall at the final round, Hampshire ended the outdoor season in fifth. In the season-ending playoffs of the 2026 SuperMotocross World Championship, Hampshire finished seventh in the final standings. Before the end of the season, it was announced that the Rockstar Energy Husqvarna team would not return for 2027, ending Hampshire's six year spell with the manufacturer. Following the conclusion of the season, it was announced that Hampshire would join the Troy Lee Designs Red Bull Ducati team for 2027.

== Honors ==
Motocross des Nations

- Team Overall: 2025 (United States) (silver)

FIM Motocross World Championship

- 2017 MXGP of USA: MX2 (gold)

SuperMotocross World Championship

- 250SMX: 2023 (bronze)

AMA Supercross Championship

- 250SX West: 2024 (gold) , 2023 (silver)
- 250SX East: 2022 (silver) , 2025 (bronze)

Monster Energy Cup

- Amateur All-Stars: 2013 (gold)

AMA Amateur National Motocross Championship

- Open Pro Sport: 2014 (gold)
- 250A: 2014 (gold)

AMA Nicky Hayden Amateur Horizon Award

- 2014 (gold)

== AMA Supercross/Motocross results ==
Year	Rnd 1	Rnd 2	Rnd 3	Rnd 4	Rnd 5	Rnd 6	Rnd 7	Rnd 8	Rnd 9	Rnd 10	Rnd 11	Rnd 12	Rnd 13	Rnd 14	Rnd 15	Rnd 16	Rnd 17	Average Finish	Podium Percent	Place
~2023 250 SX-W	2	2	2	11	-	-	-	-	-	-	2	2	-	13	-	1	2	4.11	78%	2nd
2023 250 MX	3	5	9	2	5	4	4	4	13	OUT	OUT	-	-	-	-	-	-	5.44	22%	8th
2024 250 SX-W	1	9	6	2	-	1	-	-	-	-	2	4	-	1	-	3	2	3.10	70%	1st
2024 250 MX	OUT	OUT	OUT	OUT	OUT	OUT	OUT	OUT	OUT	9	3	-	-	-	-	-	-	6.00	50%	22nd
2025 250 SX-E	-	-	-	-	18	3	-	1	4	2	-	15	3	2	4	-	6	5.80	50%	3rd
2025 450 MX	9	7	7	8	6	4	4	5	2	4	4	-	-	-	-	-	-	5.64	9%	5th
2026 450 SX	18 ANA	12 SDI	9 ANA	11 HOU	OUT GLE	OUT SEA	OUT ARL	OUT DAY	OUT IND	OUT BIR	OUT DET	OUT STL	OUT NAS	OUT CLE	OUT PHI	OUT DEN	OUT SLC	12.50	-	23rd
2026 450 MX	7 FOX	6 HAN	8 THU	8 HIG	4 RED	8 SOU	4 SPR	6 WAS	5 UNA	10 BUD	2 IRN	-	-	-	-	-	-	6.18	9%	5th

== SMX Results ==
Year	Rnd 1	Rnd 2	Rnd 3	Average Finish	Podium Percent	Place
2023 250 SMX	14 CON	4 CHI	3 LAC	7.00	33%	3rd
2024 250 SMX	9 CON	15 FOR	OUT LVE	12.00	-	15th
2025 450 SMX	5 CON	6 STL	6 LVE	5.67	-	7th
2026 450 SMX	16 COL	6 LOS	6 RID	9.33	-	7th
