= 2025 SuperMotocross World Championship =

Motorcycle racing competition

The 2025 SuperMotocross World Championship was the third edition of the premier combined discipline off-road motorcycle racing competition, held in the United States. Combining the AMA Supercross Championship and the AMA Motocross Championship, along with three final SuperMotocross rounds, the series ran from January to September.

Jett Lawrence went into the season as the reigning overall champion in the 450cc class, while Haiden Deegan began the campaign as the defending champion in the 250cc class.

Lawrence was able to successfully defend his title in the 450cc class, making him a three-time champion. In the 250cc class, Jo Shimoda took his first SuperMotocross World Championship, after a battle against reigning champion Deegan across the three play off rounds.

== 2025 AMA Supercross Championship ==
2025 AMA Supercross Championship
- Organizer: American Motorcyclist Association, Feld Entertainment (except Daytona), NASCAR Holdings, Inc. (Daytona)
- Discipline: Supercross
- Duration: January – May 2025
- Number of races: 17
- TV partners: NBC Sports (NBC, USA Network, CNBC, Peacock)

Seasons
- ← 2024 2026 →

The 2025 AMA Supercross Championship was the 52nd season of off-road stadium motorcycle racing in the United States. Comprising 17 rounds, the series ran from January until May, crowning supercross champions in both the 250cc and 450cc classes, concluding with the Salt Lake City round on May 10.

2025 Monster Energy AMA Supercross Championship
| Round (250 East/West) | Date | Location | Stadium | Broadcast | 450cc Winner | 250cc Winner |
|---|---|---|---|---|---|---|
| 1 (W) | January 11 | (California) Anaheim | Angel Stadium | Peacock, USA (live), NBC (delay) | (United States) Chase Sexton (I) | (Japan) Jo Shimoda (I) |
| 2 (W) | January 18 | (California) San Diego | Snapdragon Stadium | Peacock (live) | (United States) Eli Tomac (I) | (United States) Julien Beaumer (I) |
| 3 (W) | January 25 | (California) Anaheim | Angel Stadium | Peacock (live) | (Australia) Jett Lawrence (I) | (United States) Haiden Deegan (I) |
| 4 (W) | February 1 | (Arizona) Glendale | State Farm Stadium | Peacock (live) | (United States) Chase Sexton (II) | (United States) Jordon Smith (I) |
| 5 (E) | February 8 | (Florida) Tampa | Raymond James Stadium | Peacock (live) | (United States) Malcolm Stewart (I) | (United Kingdom) Max Anstie (I) |
| 6 (E) | February 15 | (Michigan) Detroit | Ford Field | Peacock (live) | (United States) Cooper Webb (I) | (United States) Levi Kitchen (I) |
| 7 (W) | February 22 | (Texas) Arlington | AT&T Stadium | Peacock (live) | (United States) Cooper Webb (II) | (United States) Haiden Deegan (II) |
| 8 (E) | March 1 | (Florida) Daytona | Daytona International Speedway | Peacock (live) | (Germany) Ken Roczen (I) | (United States) RJ Hampshire (I) |
| 9 (E/W) | March 8 | (Indiana) Indianapolis | Lucas Oil Stadium | Peacock (live) | (United States) Cooper Webb (III) | (United States) Seth Hammaker (I) |
| 10 (E) | March 22 | (Alabama) Birmingham | Protective Stadium | Peacock (live) | (United States) Chase Sexton (III) | (United States) Nate Thrasher (I) |
| 11 (W) | March 29 | (Washington (state)) Seattle | Lumen Field | Peacock, NBC (live) | (United States) Cooper Webb (IV) | (New Zealand) Cole Davies (I) |
| 12 (E) | April 5 | (Massachusetts) Foxborough | Gillette Stadium | Peacock (live) | (United States) Aaron Plessinger (I) | (United States) Chance Hymas (I) |
| 13 (E/W) | April 12 | (Pennsylvania) Philadelphia | Lincoln Financial Field | Peacock, NBC (live) | (United States) Chase Sexton (IV) | (New Zealand) Cole Davies (II) |
| 14 (E) | April 19 | (New Jersey) East Rutherford | MetLife Stadium | Peacock, NBC (live) | (United States) Chase Sexton (V) | (United States) Seth Hammaker (II) |
| 15 (E) | April 26 | (Pennsylvania) Pittsburgh | Acrisure Stadium | Peacock (live), NBC (delay) | (United States) Cooper Webb (V) | (France) Tom Vialle (I) |
| 16 (W) | May 3 | (Colorado) Denver | Empower Field at Mile High | Peacock (live), NBC (delay) | (United States) Chase Sexton (VI) | (United States) Haiden Deegan (III) |
| 17 (E/W) | May 10 | (Utah) Salt Lake City | Rice-Eccles Stadium | Peacock, USA (live) | (United States) Chase Sexton (VII) | (United States) Haiden Deegan (IV) |

=== Stadium locations ===
2025 AMA Supercross Championship locations

== 2025 AMA Motocross Championship ==
2025 AMA Motocross Championship
- Organizer: American Motorcyclist Association
- Discipline: Motocross
- Duration: May – August 2025
- Number of races: 11
- TV partners: NBC Sports (NBC, USA Network, CNBC, Peacock)

The 2025 AMA Motocross Championship was the 54th season of the premier off-road motocross racing series in the United States. Comprising eleven rounds across three months from late May until August, the series crowned champions in both 250cc and 450cc classes.

2025 Lucas Oil Pro Motocross Championship
| Round | Date | Event | Racetrack | Broadcast | 250cc Winner | 450cc Winner |
|---|---|---|---|---|---|---|
| 1 | May 24 | (California) Fox Raceway National | Fox Raceway | Peacock (live) | (United States) Haiden Deegan | (Australia) Jett Lawrence |
| 2 | May 31 | (California) Hangtown Classic | Hangtown | Peacock (live) | (United States) Haiden Deegan | (Australia) Jett Lawrence |
| 3 | June 7 | (Colorado) Thunder Valley National | Thunder Valley | Peacock, NBC (live) | (United States) Chance Hymas | (Australia) Jett Lawrence |
| 4 | June 14 | (Pennsylvania) High Point National | High Point | Peacock (live) | (United States) Haiden Deegan | (Australia) Jett Lawrence |
| 5 | June 28 | (Massachusetts) Southwick National | Southwick MX | Peacock, NBC (live) | (United States) Haiden Deegan | (Australia) Jett Lawrence |
| 6 | July 5 | (Michigan) Red Bud National | RedBud | Peacock, NBC (live) | (Japan) Jo Shimoda | (Australia) Jett Lawrence |
| 7 | July 12 | (Minnesota) Spring Creek National | Spring Creek | Peacock (live), USA (delay) | (United States) Haiden Deegan | (Australia) Jett Lawrence |
| 8 | July 19 | (Washington (state)) Washougal National | Washougal MX | Peacock, NBC (live) | (Japan) Jo Shimoda | (United States) Chase Sexton |
| 9 | August 9 | (Indiana) Ironman National | Ironman MX | Peacock (live), USA (delay) | (United States) Haiden Deegan | (Australia) Hunter Lawrence |
| 10 | August 16 | (New York (state)) Unadilla National | Unadilla | Peacock (live) | (Japan) Jo Shimoda | (Australia) Jett Lawrence |
| 11 | August 23 | (Maryland) Budds Creek National | Budds Creek MX | Peacock (live) | (United States) Haiden Deegan | (Australia) Jett Lawrence |

=== Track locations ===
2025 AMA Motocross Championship locations

== 2025 SuperMotocross World Championship ==
2025 SuperMotocross World Championship
- Organizer: American Motorcyclist Association
- Discipline: Supercross and Motocross
- Duration: September 2025
- Number of races: 3
- TV partners: NBC Sports (NBC, USA Network, CNBC, Peacock)

Seasons
- ← 2024 2026 →

The 2025 SuperMotocross World Championship was the third season of the premier worldwide off-road motorcycle racing series, to be held in the United States. Combining the results of the 17 AMA Supercross Championship rounds and 11 AMA Motocross Championship events, the series comprised 31 rounds in total, with three dedicated SuperMotocross rounds that determined the overall champion of AMA off-road motorcycle racing for the season.

2025 SuperMotocross World Championship
| Round | Date | Location | Stadium | Broadcast | 250cc Winner | 450cc Winner |
|---|---|---|---|---|---|---|
| 1 | September 6 | (North Carolina) Concord | zMAX Dragway | Peacock, NBC (live) | (United States) Haiden Deegan | (Australia) Jett Lawrence |
| 2 | September 13 | (Missouri) St. Louis | America's Center (both convention center and stadium) | Peacock (live); NBC (delay) | (Japan) Jo Shimoda | (Australia) Hunter Lawrence |
| 3 | September 20 | (Nevada) Las Vegas | The Strip at Las Vegas Motor Speedway | Peacock, USA (live) | (Japan) Jo Shimoda | (Australia) Jett Lawrence |

== 450SMX Qualifying ==
The top 20 riders from the combined standings of the 2025 AMA Supercross Championship and the 2025 AMA National Motocross Championship automatically qualify and are seeded into each round of the SuperMotocross World Championship.

Riders from 21st-30th in the combined standings will compete in the Last Chance Qualifier in each event, with the top 2 from this competing in the main events with the seeded riders. The LCQ is also open to riders who won a supercross main event or motocross moto if they did not finish inside the top 30. If a seeded top 20 rider is unable to compete in an event, an additional opportunity to qualify will be given to riders in the LCQ.

=== Entry list ===
Seeded Riders
| Qualified Position | Team | Constructor | No | Rider | Rounds |
|---|---|---|---|---|---|
| 2nd | Honda HRC Progressive | Honda | 1 | (Australia) Jett Lawrence | All |
| 5th | Honda HRC Progressive | Honda | 96 | (Australia) Hunter Lawrence | All |
| 4th | Monster Energy Yamaha Star Racing | Yamaha | 2 | (United States) Cooper Webb | All |
| 7th | Monster Energy Yamaha Star Racing | Yamaha | 3 | (United States) Eli Tomac | All |
| 1st | Monster Energy Yamaha Star Racing | Yamaha | 32 | (United States) Justin Cooper | All |
| 6th | Red Bull KTM Factory Racing | KTM | 4 | (United States) Chase Sexton | All |
| 16th | Quadlock Honda Racing | Honda | 12 | (United States) Shane McElrath | All |
| 14th | Quadlock Honda Racing | Honda | 17 | (United States) Joey Savatgy | All |
| 12th | Phoenix Racing Honda | Honda | 14 | (France) Dylan Ferrandis | All |
| 10th | Rockstar Energy Husqvarna Factory Racing | Husqvarna | 24 | (United States) RJ Hampshire | All |
| 3rd | Rockstar Energy Husqvarna Factory Racing | Husqvarna | 27 | (United States) Malcolm Stewart | 1–2 |
| 19th | Team Tedder Racing | KTM | 46 | (United States) Justin Hill | All |
| 9th | Rockstar Energy Gas Gas Factory Racing | Gas Gas | 51 | (United States) Justin Barcia | All |
| 20th | Partzilla Blaster PRMX Racing | Kawasaki | 86 | (United States) Mitchell Harrison | All |
| 11th | Progressive Insurance ECSTAR Suzuki | Suzuki | 94 | (Germany) Ken Roczen | All |
| 18th | Gizmo Mods Rock River Yamaha Racing | Yamaha | 992 | (Switzerland) Valentin Guillod | All |
LCQ Riders
| Qualified Position | Team | Constructor | No | Rider | Rounds |
| 27th | Twisted Tea HEP Suzuki | Suzuki | 11 | (United States) Kyle Chisholm | All |
| 32nd | Quadlock Honda Racing | Honda | 15 | (United Kingdom) Dean Wilson | All |
| 33rd | MX6 Racing | Yamaha | 35 | (United States) Marshal Weltin | All |
| 21st | Muc-Off/FXR/ClubMX Yamaha | Yamaha | 37 | (United States) Coty Schock | All |
| 22nd | MRPSBR Husqvarna Racing | Husqvarna | 42 | (Estonia) Harri Kullas | All |
| 28th | Gizmo Mods Rock River Yamaha Racing | Yamaha | 43 | (United States) Grant Harlan | All |
| 23rd | Liqui Moly Beta Factory Racing | Beta | 49 | (United States) Mitchell Oldenburg | All |
| 24th | Liqui Moly Beta Factory Racing | Beta | 57 | (United States) Benny Bloss | All |
| 31st | The McGinley Clinic Privateer Support Program | Yamaha | 53 | (France) Romain Pape | All |
| 38th | Valley Motorsports | Honda | 68 | (United States) Jeremy Hand | All |
| 42nd | Toyota Redlands BarX Yamaha | Yamaha | 80 | (United States) Derek Drake | All |
| 39th | IQ Racing Team | Honda | 199 | (United States) John Short IV | All |

=== Riders Championship ===
| Pos | Rider | Bike | Points Reset | CON (North Carolina) | STL (Missouri) | LVE (Nevada) | Points |
|---|---|---|---|---|---|---|---|
| 1 | (Australia) Jett Lawrence | Honda | 22 | 1 | 2 | 1 | 166 |
| 2 | (Australia) Hunter Lawrence | Honda | 17 | 4 | 1 | 2 | 151 |
| 3 | (United States) Eli Tomac | Yamaha | 15 | 3 | 3 | 3 | 135 |
| 4 | (Germany) Ken Roczen | Suzuki | 11 | 6 | 4 | 4 | 117 |
| 5 | (United States) Justin Cooper | Yamaha | 25 | 11 | 8 | 5 | 115 |
| 6 | (United States) Cooper Webb | Yamaha | 18 | 7 | 5 | 7 | 112 |
| 7 | (United States) RJ Hampshire | Husqvarna | 12 | 5 | 6 | 6 | 109 |
| 8 | (United States) Chase Sexton | KTM | 16 | 2 | 7 | 14 | 92 |
| 9 | (United States) Joey Savatgy | Honda | 8 | 9 | 9 | 8 | 89 |
| 10 | (United States) Justin Barcia | Gas Gas | 13 | 10 | 11 | 9 | 86 |
| 11 | (France) Dylan Ferrandis | Honda | 10 | 8 | 10 | 16 | 66 |
| 12 | (United States) Justin Hill | KTM | 3 | 13 | 15 | 10 | 62 |
| 13 | (United States) Benny Bloss | Beta | | 12 | 12 | 13 | 57 |
| 14 | (United States) Shane McElrath | Honda | 6 | 15 | 18 | 11 | 54 |
| 15 | (United States) Coty Schock | Yamaha | | 18 | 13 | 12 | 52 |
| 16 | (Switzerland) Valentin Guillod | Yamaha | 4 | 14 | 14 | 15 | 49 |
| 17 | (United Kingdom) Dean Wilson | Honda | | 16 | 21 | 17 | 23 |
| 18 | (United States) Marshal Weltin | Yamaha | | DNQ | 16 | 19 | 21 |
| 19 | (United States) Malcolm Stewart | Husqvarna | 20 | DNS | DNS | | 20 |
| 20 | (Estonia) Harri Kullas | Husqvarna | | 19 | DNQ | 18 | 15 |
| 21 | (United States) Mitchell Harrison | Kawasaki | 2 | 20 | 17 | 22 | 14 |
| 22 | (United States) Aaron Plessinger | KTM | 14 | | | | 14 |
| 23 | (United States) Mitchell Oldenburg | Beta | | 17 | 19 | DNQ | 11 |
| 24 | (Spain) Jorge Prado | Kawasaki | 9 | | | | 9 |
| 25 | (United States) Jason Anderson | Kawasaki | 7 | | | | 7 |
| 26 | (United States) Derek Drake | Yamaha | | DNQ | DNQ | 20 | 6 |
| 27 | (United States) Colt Nichols | Suzuki | 5 | | | | 5 |
| 28 | (United States) Kyle Chisholm | Suzuki | | DNQ | 20 | DNQ | 4 |
| 29 | (United States) Grant Harlan | Yamaha | | DNQ | DNQ | 21 | 3 |
| 30 | (United States) Jeremy Hand | Honda | | 21 | 22 | DNQ | 1 |
| | (France) Romain Pape | Yamaha | | 22 | DNQ | DNQ | 0 |
| | (United States) John Short IV | Honda | | DNQ | DNQ | DNQ | 0 |
| Pos | Rider | Bike | Points Reset | CON (North Carolina) | STL (Missouri) | LVE (Nevada) | Points |

== 250SMX Qualifying ==
The top 20 riders from the combined standings of the 2025 AMA Supercross Championship and the 2025 AMA National Motocross Championship automatically qualify and are seeded into each round of the SuperMotocross World Championship.

Riders from 21st-30th in the combined standings will compete in the Last Chance Qualifier in each event, with the top 2 from this competing in the main events with the seeded riders. The LCQ is also open to riders who won a supercross main event or motocross moto if they did not finish inside the top 30. If a seeded top 20 rider is unable to compete in an event, an additional opportunity to qualify will be given to riders in the LCQ.

=== Entry list ===
Seeded Riders
| Qualified Position | Team | Constructor | No | Rider | Rounds |
|---|---|---|---|---|---|
| 1st | Monster Energy Star Racing Yamaha | Yamaha | 1 | (United States) Haiden Deegan | All |
| 11th | Monster Energy Star Racing Yamaha | Yamaha | 41 | (United States) Nate Thrasher | All |
| 17th | Monster Energy Star Racing Yamaha | Yamaha | 100 | (New Zealand) Cole Davies | All |
| 4th | Red Bull KTM Factory Racing | KTM | 16 | (France) Tom Vialle | All |
| 7th | Red Bull KTM Factory Racing | KTM | 23 | (United States) Julien Beaumer | 1 |
| 9th | Triumph Racing Factory Team | Triumph | 19 | (United States) Jordon Smith | All |
| 14th | Triumph Racing Factory Team | Triumph | 83 | (United States) Austin Forkner | 1–2 |
| 15th | Rockstar Energy Gas Gas Factory Racing | Gas Gas | 25 | (United States) Ryder DiFrancesco | All |
| 2nd | Honda HRC Progressive | Honda | 30 | (Japan) Jo Shimoda | All |
| 3rd | Monster Energy Pro Circuit Kawasaki | Kawasaki | 36 | (United States) Garrett Marchbanks | All |
| 6th | Monster Energy Pro Circuit Kawasaki | Kawasaki | 47 | (United States) Levi Kitchen | All |
| 5th | Monster Energy Pro Circuit Kawasaki | Kawasaki | 56 | (United States) Seth Hammaker | All |
| 16th | Monster Energy Pro Circuit Kawasaki | Kawasaki | 98 | (United States) Drew Adams | All |
| 19th | Toyota Redlands BarX Yamaha | Yamaha | 44 | (United States) Dilan Schwartz | All |
| 18th | Toyota Redlands BarX Yamaha | Yamaha | 302 | (United States) Parker Ross | All |
| 8th | Muc-Off/FXR/ClubMX Yamaha | Yamaha | 92 | (United States) Maximus Vohland | 1–2 |
LCQ Riders
| Qualified Position | Team | Constructor | No | Rider | Rounds |
| 22nd | Monster Energy Pro Circuit Kawasaki | Kawasaki | 26 | (United States) Ty Masterpool | All |
| 30th | Monster Energy Star Racing Yamaha | Yamaha | 31 | (United Kingdom) Max Anstie | All |
| 27th | Monster Energy Star Racing Yamaha | Yamaha | 34 | (United States) Daxton Bennick | All |
| 29th | MX6 Racing | Yamaha | 55 | (United States) Henry Miller | All |
| 23rd | Phoenix Racing Honda | Honda | 59 | (United States) Cullin Park | All |
| 32nd | AEO Powersports KTM Racing Team | KTM | 61 | (Canada) Cole Thompson | All |
| 21st | AEO Powersports KTM Racing Team | KTM | 65 | (United States) Lux Turner | All |
| 31st | Partzilla Blaster Power PRMX Racing | Kawasaki | 63 | (United States) Hunter Yoder | All |
| 41st | The Dirt Bike Depot | KTM | 75 | (United States) Gage Linville | All |
| 45th | Gizmo Mods Rock River Yamaha Racing | Yamaha | 91 | (United States) TJ Albright | 1 |
| 53rd | Neese Racing | Honda | 125 | (United States) Luke Neese | 1–2 |
| 47th | Rodbell Racing | Honda | 148 | (United States) Justin Rodbell | All |

=== Riders Championship ===
| Pos | Rider | Bike | Points Reset | CON (North Carolina) | STL (Missouri) | LVE (Nevada) | Points |
|---|---|---|---|---|---|---|---|
| 1 | (Japan) Jo Shimoda | Honda | 22 | 3 | 1 | 1 | 167 |
| 2 | (United States) Seth Hammaker | Kawasaki | 17 | 2 | 2 | 2 | 144 |
| 3 | (France) Tom Vialle | KTM | 18 | 7 | 5 | 3 | 127 |
| 4 | (United States) Nate Thrasher | Yamaha | 11 | 9 | 3 | 4 | 118 |
| 5 | (United States) Haiden Deegan | Yamaha | 25 | 1 | 6 | 9 | 116 |
| 6 | (United States) Ty Masterpool | Kawasaki | | 10 | 4 | 5 | 99 |
| 7 | (United States) Jordon Smith | Triumph | 13 | 17 | 7 | 6 | 96 |
| 8 | (United States) Garrett Marchbanks | Kawasaki | 20 | 22 | 14 | 7 | 81 |
| 9 | (United States) Levi Kitchen | Kawasaki | 16 | 4 | 10 | 14 | 77 |
| 10 | (United States) Daxton Bennick | Yamaha | | 15 | 8 | 12 | 65 |
| 11 | (United States) Dilan Schwartz | Yamaha | 3 | 14 | 15 | 10 | 61 |
| 12 | (United States) Lux Turner | KTM | | 18 | 17 | 8 | 56 |
| 13 | (United States) Drew Adams | Kawasaki | 6 | 11 | 12 | 16 | 55 |
| 14 | (United States) Cullin Park | Honda | | 16 | 16 | 11 | 51 |
| 15 | (United Kingdom) Max Anstie | Yamaha | | 13 | 9 | 17 | 50 |
| 16 | (United States) Ryder DiFrancesco | Gas Gas | 7 | 6 | 13 | 22 | 41 |
| 17 | (New Zealand) Cole Davies | Yamaha | 5 | 8 | 11 | 23 | 41 |
| 18 | (United States) Parker Ross | Yamaha | 4 | 20 | 18 | 13 | 41 |
| 19 | (United States) Gage Linville | KTM | | 19 | 21 | 15 | 26 |
| 20 | (United States) Austin Forkner | Triumph | 8 | 5 | DNS | | 25 |
| 21 | (United States) Maximus Vohland | Yamaha | 14 | 12 | DNS | | 24 |
| 22 | (United States) Julien Beaumer | KTM | 15 | DNS | | | 15 |
| 23 | (United States) Henry Miller | Yamaha | | 21 | | 18 | 13 |
| 24 | (Canada) Cole Thompson | KTM | | DNQ | 20 | 19 | 13 |
| 25 | (United States) Michael Mosiman | Yamaha | 12 | | | | 12 |
| 26 | (United States) Chance Hymas | Honda | 10 | | | | 10 |
| 27 | (United States) Hunter Yoder | Kawasaki | | DNQ | 19 | 21 | 9 |
| 28 | (Denmark) Mikkel Haarup | Triumph | 9 | | | | 9 |
| 29 | (United States) Justin Rodbell | Honda | | DNQ | 22 | 20 | 6 |
| 30 | (United States) RJ Hampshire | Husqvarna | 2 | | | | 2 |
| | (United States) Luke Neese | Honda | | DNQ | DNQ | | 0 |
| | (United States) TJ Albright | Yamaha | | DNQ | | | 0 |
| Pos | Rider | Bike | Points Reset | CON (North Carolina) | STL (Missouri) | LVE (Nevada) | Points |
