= Monster Energy Cup =

The Monster Energy Cup may refer to

- Monster Energy Cup (Supercross), an annual AMA Supercross Championship event in Las Vegas
- NASCAR Cup Series, also known as the Monster Energy NASCAR Cup Series
