= Cole Davies =

New Zealand motocross racer

- Nationality: (New Zealand) New Zealander
- Born: 28 August 2007 (age 19) Waitoki, New Zealand

Motocross career
- Years active: 2025-Present
- Teams: •Monster Energy Yamaha Star Racing (2025-Present)
- Championships: •2026 AMA Supercross 250cc East; •2026 AMA Motocross 250cc
- Wins: •250cc AMA Supercross: 8; •250cc AMA Motocross: 4; •AMA Total Wins: 12

Cole Davies (born August 28, 2007) is a New Zealand professional Motocross and Supercross racer. Davies is the 2026 AMA Supercross 250cc East & AMA Motocross 250cc champion.

In his debut season, Davies was able to take his first professional supercross win, when he won the 250SX West class at the Seattle round.

In his second professional season, Davies took eight supercross main event wins and four overall motocross round wins. With indoor and outdoor championships to his name, he was the dominant force in the American 250 class in 2026.

After travelling from New Zealand to America to compete in several rounds of the Supercross Futures amateur competition in 2023, Davies was picked up by the official Gas Gas amateur programme for 2024. Davies left Gas Gas after the Supercross Futures events in 2024, to join the Monster Energy Yamaha Star Racing team from that summer onwards.

== Career ==
=== Amateur career ===
Davies joined the Altherm JCR Yamaha team for the 2022 season in New Zealand, where he was able to win both of the classes he competed in. With the help of his sponsors, Davies competed in a limited campaign in the Supercross Futures class that supported the 2023 AMA Supercross Championship. At opening round, he was able to finish fourth on his debut in America and after making two further Supercross Futures entries in the year, signed for the official Gas Gas amateur team for 2024.

The 2024 Supercross Futures season proved to be a breakthrough for Davies, winning the opening qualifying round as well as the championship-deciding finale in Salt Lake City. Following this, Davies joined the Monster Energy Yamaha Star Racing to compete in various amateur events in the United States. Competing in the Scouting Moto Combine events that supported several rounds of the 2024 AMA National Motocross Championship, winning the second event at Ironman Raceway. In addition, Davies was able to finish third in the 250 Pro Sport class at the AMA Amateur National Motocross Championship.

=== 250 career ===
After initially being expected to complete a full season as an amateur in 2025, the Monster Energy Yamaha Star Racing team decided to move Davies up to make his professional debut in the 250SX West class of the 2025 AMA Supercross Championship. Davies immediately showed his readiness for the class, scoring his first podium at the third round and matching the result at the following round. Continuing his forward progression, Davies was able to win the seventh round in Seattle, taking the holeshot and leading the majority of the race. He backed this up by winning the following round in Philadelphia. Davies again found himself leading the main event at the penultimate round but was involved in a racing incident with his teammate Haiden Deegan, where he went off the track. He was unable to race at the final round after being landed on in qualifying by Jordon Smith. Davies did not return to racing until the final two rounds of the 2025 AMA National Motocross Championship. He was credited with a race win at the final round due to Haiden Deegan and Jo Shimoda being penalised after the chequered flag. Davies finished seventeenth overall in the 2025 SuperMotocross World Championship playoff rounds, with a best position of eighth at the opening event.

Davies competed in the 250SX East class of the 2026 AMA Supercross Championship where, after a fifth at the opening round, he never finished lower than third across the remaining nine rounds. Included within this streak were six wins, making him the dominant rider in the championship. He took the title, in his second professional season, by over 50 points. Davies continued his form into the 2026 AMA National Motocross Championship, scoring his first outdoor overall podium at the opening round. After a race win at the third round, he took his first overall motocross win at the following round at High Point Raceway. Davies would take three further overall wins, alongside two other podiums to win the title by thirty-eight points. After taking both indoor and outdoor titles, Davies went into the 2026 SuperMotocross World Championship playoffs as the top seeded rider. A win at the final would be the highlight however, as finishing tenth and fourteenth at the other two would harm his chances of taking the title. Davies would still end the playoffs in third despite this.

== AMA Supercross/Motocross results ==
Year	Rnd 1	Rnd 2	Rnd 3	Rnd 4	Rnd 5	Rnd 6	Rnd 7	Rnd 8	Rnd 9	Rnd 10	Rnd 11	Rnd 12	Rnd 13	Rnd 14	Rnd 15	Rnd 16	Rnd 17	Average Finish	Podium Percent	Place
‘2025 250 SX-W	8 ANA (California)	4 SDI (California)	3 ANA (California)	3 GLE (Arizona)	-	-	7 ARL (Texas)	-	5 IND (Indiana)	-	1 SEA (Washington (state))	-	1 PHI (Pennsylvania)	-	-	5 DEN (Colorado)	OUT SLC (Utah)	4.11	44%	3rd
2025 250 MX	OUT	OUT	OUT	OUT	OUT	OUT	OUT	OUT	OUT	26 UNA (New York (state))	7 BUD (Maryland)	-	-	-	-	-	-	16.50	-	27th
2026 250 SX-E	-	-	-	-	-	-	5 ARL (Texas)	2 DAY (Florida)	1 IND (Indiana)	1 BIR (Alabama)	1 DET (Michigan)	2 STL (Missouri)	1 NAS (Tennessee)	3 CLE (Ohio)	1 PHI (Pennsylvania)	-	1 SLC (Utah)	1.80	90%	1st
2026 250 MX	3 FOX (California)	4 HAN (California)	10 THU (Colorado)	1 HIG (Pennsylvania)	1 RED (Michigan)	3 SOU (Massachusetts)	16 SPR (Minnesota)	1 WAS (Washington (state))	1 UNA (New York (state))	2 BUD (Maryland)	7 IRN (Indiana)	-	-	-	-	-	-	4.45	64%	1st

== SMX Results ==
Year	Rnd 1	Rnd 2	Rnd 3	Average Finish	Podium Percent	Place
2025 250 SMX	8 CON (North Carolina)	11 STL (Missouri)	23 LVE (Nevada)	14.00	-	17th
2026 250 SMX	10 COL (Ohio)	14 LOS (California)	1 RID (Missouri)	8.33	33%	3rd

== Honours ==
SuperMotocross World Championship

- 250SMX: 2026 (bronze)

AMA Supercross Championship

- 250SX East: 2026 (gold)
- 250SX West: 2025 (bronze)

AMA Motocross Championship

- 250: 2026 (gold)

AMA Amateur National Motocross Championship

- 250 Pro Sport: 2024 (bronze)

AMA Supercross Futures

- 250SX Futures: 2024 (gold)

New Zealand Junior Motocross Championship

- 14-16 years 250cc: 2022 (gold)
- 15-16 years 125cc: 2022 (gold)
