= 2025 AMA Supercross Championship =

Edition of AMA Supercross Championship

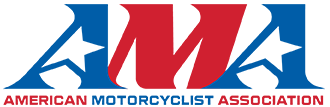
- Organizer: American Motorcyclist Association, Feld Entertainment (except Daytona), NASCAR Holdings, Inc. (Daytona)
- Discipline: Supercross
- Duration: January – May 2025
- Number of races: 17
- TV partners: NBC Sports (NBC, USA Network, CNBC, Peacock)

Champions
- 450cc: (United States) Cooper Webb
- 250cc West: (United States) Haiden Deegan
- 250cc East: (France) Tom Vialle

AMA Supercross Championship
- ← 2024 2026 →

The 2025 AMA Supercross Championship was the 52nd season of off-road stadium motorcycle racing in the United States.

Comprising 17 rounds, the series ran from January until May, crowning supercross champions in both the 250cc and 450cc classes, concluding with the Salt Lake City round on May 10. Jett Lawrence went into the season as the reigning champion in the premier 450SX class.

The series formed the first part of the 2025 SuperMotocross World Championship.

== Schedule and results ==
The 2025 AMA Supercross Championship was the 52nd season of off-road stadium motorcycle racing in the United States. Comprising 17 rounds, the series ran from January until May, crowning supercross champions in both the 250cc and 450cc classes, concluding with the Salt Lake City round on May 10.

2025 Monster Energy AMA Supercross Championship
Round (250 East/West)	Date	Location	Stadium	Broadcast	450cc Winner	250cc Winner
1 (W)	January 11	(California) Anaheim	Angel Stadium	Peacock, USA (live), NBC (delay)	(United States) Chase Sexton (I)	(Japan) Jo Shimoda (I)
2 (W)	January 18	(California) San Diego	Snapdragon Stadium	Peacock (live)	(United States) Eli Tomac (I)	(United States) Julien Beaumer (I)
3 (W)	January 25	(California) Anaheim	Angel Stadium	Peacock (live)	(Australia) Jett Lawrence (I)	(United States) Haiden Deegan (I)
4 (W)	February 1	(Arizona) Glendale	State Farm Stadium	Peacock (live)	(United States) Chase Sexton (II)	(United States) Jordon Smith (I)
5 (E)	February 8	(Florida) Tampa	Raymond James Stadium	Peacock (live)	(United States) Malcolm Stewart (I)	(United Kingdom) Max Anstie (I)
6 (E)	February 15	(Michigan) Detroit	Ford Field	Peacock (live)	(United States) Cooper Webb (I)	(United States) Levi Kitchen (I)
7 (W)	February 22	(Texas) Arlington	AT&T Stadium	Peacock (live)	(United States) Cooper Webb (II)	(United States) Haiden Deegan (II)
8 (E)	March 1	(Florida) Daytona	Daytona International Speedway	Peacock (live)	(Germany) Ken Roczen (I)	(United States) RJ Hampshire (I)
9 (E/W)	March 8	(Indiana) Indianapolis	Lucas Oil Stadium	Peacock (live)	(United States) Cooper Webb (III)	(United States) Seth Hammaker (I)
10 (E)	March 22	(Alabama) Birmingham	Protective Stadium	Peacock (live)	(United States) Chase Sexton (III)	(United States) Nate Thrasher (I)
11 (W)	March 29	(Washington (state)) Seattle	Lumen Field	Peacock, NBC (live)	(United States) Cooper Webb (IV)	(New Zealand) Cole Davies (I)
12 (E)	April 5	(Massachusetts) Foxborough	Gillette Stadium	Peacock (live)	(United States) Aaron Plessinger (I)	(United States) Chance Hymas (I)
13 (E/W)	April 12	(Pennsylvania) Philadelphia	Lincoln Financial Field	Peacock, NBC (live)	(United States) Chase Sexton (IV)	(New Zealand) Cole Davies (II)
14 (E)	April 19	(New Jersey) East Rutherford	MetLife Stadium	Peacock, NBC (live)	(United States) Chase Sexton (V)	(United States) Seth Hammaker (II)
15 (E)	April 26	(Pennsylvania) Pittsburgh	Acrisure Stadium	Peacock (live), NBC (delay)	(United States) Cooper Webb (V)	(France) Tom Vialle (I)
16 (W)	May 3	(Colorado) Denver	Empower Field at Mile High	Peacock (live), NBC (delay)	(United States) Chase Sexton (VI)	(United States) Haiden Deegan (III)
17 (E/W)	May 10	(Utah) Salt Lake City	Rice-Eccles Stadium	Peacock, USA (live)	(United States) Chase Sexton (VII)	(United States) Haiden Deegan (IV)

=== Stadium locations ===
2025 AMA Supercross Championship locations

== 450 SX ==
=== Entry list ===
Team	Constructor	No	Rider	Rounds
Team Honda HRC Progressive	Honda	1	(Australia) Jett Lawrence	1–4
Team Honda HRC Progressive	Honda	15	(United Kingdom) Dean Wilson	13–17
Team Honda HRC Progressive	Honda	96	(Australia) Hunter Lawrence	1–5
Monster Energy Yamaha Star Racing	Yamaha	2	(United States) Cooper Webb	All
Monster Energy Yamaha Star Racing	Yamaha	3	(United States) Eli Tomac	1–5
Monster Energy Yamaha Star Racing	Yamaha	28	(United States) Christian Craig	10–17
Monster Energy Yamaha Star Racing	Yamaha	32	(United States) Justin Cooper	All
Red Bull KTM Factory Racing	KTM	4	(United States) Chase Sexton	All
Red Bull KTM Factory Racing	KTM	7	(United States) Aaron Plessinger	All
Twisted Tea Suzuki Presented by Progressive Insurance	Suzuki	11	(United States) Kyle Chisholm	All
Twisted Tea Suzuki Presented by Progressive Insurance	Suzuki	45	(United States) Colt Nichols	All
Quadlock Honda Racing	Honda	12	(United States) Shane McElrath	All
Quadlock Honda Racing	Honda	17	(United States) Joey Savatgy	1–9, 12–17
Phoenix Racing Honda	Honda	14	(France) Dylan Ferrandis	1–4, 6–17
Monster Energy Kawasaki	Kawasaki	21	(United States) Jason Anderson	1–10
Monster Energy Kawasaki	Kawasaki	70	(Spain) Jorge Prado	1–3
Rockstar Energy Husqvarna Factory Racing	Husqvarna	27	(United States) Malcolm Stewart	All
International Supercross Race Team	Kawasaki	33	(Sweden) Fredrik Norén	1–4, 7–17
International Supercross Race Team	Kawasaki	282	(United States) Theodore Pauli	All
Gizmo Mods Rock River Yamaha Racing	Yamaha	35	(United States) Marshal Weltin	1–3, 9–10, 12–16
Gizmo Mods Rock River Yamaha Racing	Yamaha	43	(United States) Grant Harlan	All
Gizmo Mods Rock River Yamaha Racing	Yamaha	91	(United States) TJ Albright	8, 10, 12
Gizmo Mods Rock River Yamaha Racing	Yamaha	981	(United States) Austin Politelli	1–2, 11, 16
Muc-Off FXR ClubMX Yamaha Racing	Yamaha	37	(United States) Coty Schock	8
Team Tedder Monster Energy KTM	KTM	46	(United States) Justin Hill	All
Liqui Moly Beta Factory Racing	Beta	49	(United States) Mitchell Oldenburg	All
Liqui Moly Beta Factory Racing	Beta	57	(United States) Benny Bloss	All
Rockstar Energy Gas Gas Factory Racing	Gas Gas	51	(United States) Justin Barcia	1–14
Storm Lake Honda Buddy Brooks Racing	Honda	55	(United States) Henry Miller	7
Storm Lake Honda Buddy Brooks Racing	Honda	262	(Australia) Dylan Wood	5–9
Smartop MotoConcepts Honda Racing	Honda	66	(United States) Vince Friese	1–2
Smartop MotoConcepts Honda Racing	Honda	200	(United States) Ryan Breece	1, 8
Valley Motorsports	Honda	68	(United States) Jeremy Hand	5–10, 12–17
Rides Unlimited Rocky Mountain ATV MC Racing	KTM	72	(Venezuela) Anthony Rodríguez	All
Rides Unlimited Rocky Mountain ATV MC Racing	KTM	364	(United States) Chad Saultz	6
Rides Unlimited Rocky Mountain ATV MC Racing	KTM	526	(United States) Nick Laurie	9–10, 12–15
Estenson Racing/TruLine Corp	Yamaha	77	(United States) Jerry Robin	1–14
Partzilla PRMX Kawasaki	Kawasaki	78	(United States) Cade Clason	1–5, 13–17
Partzilla PRMX Kawasaki	Kawasaki	86	(United States) Mitchell Harrison	All
Progressive Insurance ECSTAR Suzuki	Suzuki	94	(Germany) Ken Roczen	1–15
Harriman Concepts	KTM	116	(United States) Devin Harriman	11
Firefly/Mountain Movers/Coal Train Jones Powersports Yamaha	Yamaha	118	(United States) Cheyenne Harmon	8–9, 12–17
TB Racing	Gas Gas	120	(United States) Todd Bannister	7, 16
Smell Good Athlete	Yamaha	121	(United States) Chris Howell	3–4, 7, 11, 16–17
MotoWhips Racing Team	Gas Gas	122	(United States) Justin Starling	All
EBR Performance Racing	Yamaha	135	(United States) Collin Allen	7
DPMX OnlyFans Racing	Yamaha	138	(United States) David Pulley	10, 12, 14–15
Champion Tool Storage Geebo KMR KTM	KTM	146	(United States) Kevin Moranz	All
Desert Crown Racing	Kawasaki	147	(United States) Ryan Carlson	4
Team Next Level Racing	Honda	148	(United States) Justin Rodbell	1–11, 13, 16–17
Team Next Level Racing	Honda	173	(United States) Hunter Schlosser	All
Team Next Level Racing	Honda	645	(United States) Colby Copp	1–10
MB Carpentry	KTM	150	(United Kingdom) Matt Bayliss	8
OnlyFans Big Mac Entertainment	Kawasaki	169	(United States) Logan Karnow	All
Zaremba Racing	Yamaha	183	(United States) Mitchell Zaremba	9
Motosport Hillsboro/Legacy Racewear	Kawasaki	207	(United States) Rider Fisher	1–4, 11
Southeast Sales Kawasaki	Kawasaki	208	(United States) Logan Leitzel	5–17
Carsten Racing	Suzuki	281	(United States) Cory Carsten	6, 8–10, 12–15
Law Tigers Privateer Paddock	Yamaha	289	(United States) Robert Hailey	11, 17
US27 Motorsports	Honda	299	(United States) Konnor Visger	6–7, 9
Desimone Racing	Kawasaki	339	(United States) Joey Desimone	1–4, 7, 11
Biese Racing	Kawasaki	343	(United States) Carter Biese	8–10
ARACOM Racing	Husqvarna	344	(United States) Justin Aragaki	7–8
K&M Rebar Legacy Honda	Honda	349	(United States) Kile Epperson	6–8
Turn One Powersports Galaxy Cloaking Husqvarna	Husqvarna	350	(United States) Chandler Baker	7
Jack Rogers Racing	Kawasaki	351	(United States) Jack Rogers	11, 13, 16–17
Welch Racing	KTM	376	(United States) Thomas Welch	7, 9
The Privateer Paddock	Kawasaki	382	(United States) Rylan Munson	5–6, 8–9
Raylentless Racing	Honda	388	(United States) Brandon Ray	2–3, 8
The McGinley Clinic Privateer Support Program	KTM	411	(United States) Scott Meshey	All
The McGinley Clinic Privateer Support Program	Yamaha	412	(United States) Jared Lesher	1–3, 5–10, 12, 14–17
The McGinley Clinic Privateer Support Program	Husqvarna	420	(United States) Jackson Gray	17
The McGinley Clinic Privateer Support Program	Yamaha	512	(United States) Austin Cozadd	1–16
The McGinley Clinic Privateer Support Program	KTM	711	(United States) Tristan Lane	All
Morris Racing	KTM	414	(United States) Mason Morris	9
Summit Coaching/Sun Powersports/Cobra Chicken	KTM	426	(United States) Ben Lamay	16
Noowell All Balls Racing EBR Yamaha	Yamaha	468	(United States) Michael Hicks	16
Randanella Racing	Kawasaki	489	(United States) Ricci Randanella	13–14
RJC4 Racing	Gas Gas	490	(United States) Ragan Cochran	4, 12, 14–15
Compass Rose International Triumph Racing	Triumph	500	(Canada) Julien Benek	16–17
Galaxy Cloaking/Cardinal Revenue Solutions/Turn One Powersports KTM	KTM	501	(United States) Scotty Wennerstrom	10, 12
Team SKVI CWF F3 Energy Rockwell	KTM	509	(United States) Alexander Nagy	1–4, 6, 9
FMF/Powersports of North Texas/Cartwright Racing	Kawasaki	519	(United States) Josh Cartwright	10, 16–17
Emory Racing	Yamaha	538	(United States) Addison Emory IV	5, 8–9, 13
Buller Racing	Husqvarna	542	(United States) Johnnie Buller	1, 3
Underdog Racing	Honda	581	(United States) Kyle Bitterman	10, 12
KTR Moto	Honda	597	(United States) Mason Kerr	9, 16
The 606 Factory	Kawasaki	606	(United States) Ronnie Stewart	8
Kalaitzian Brothers Racing	Kawasaki	636	(United States) Luke Kalaitzian	17
Piazza Racing	Yamaha	637	(United States) Bobby Piazza	1–5, 7, 9–10, 12–17
Dream Chasers Racing	Yamaha	667	(Sweden) Anton Nordström Graaf	8
Stan Benson	Kawasaki	672	(United States) Brandon Pederson	7
Vault Leverage Capital	Husqvarna	726	(United States) Gared Steinke	1–3
Hillview Motorsports	Kawasaki	738	(United States) Steve Roman	15
Doug Manhire Racing	Honda	770	(United States) Doug Manhire	2
Tech Service Racing	Yamaha	777	(United States) James Harrington	13
MRPSBR Husqvarna Racing	Husqvarna	805	(United States) Slade Varola	10, 12
Dickey Racing	KTM	812	(United States) Luke Dickey	14–15
Stephenson Racing	Husqvarna	824	(United States) Carter Stephenson	9, 15
Team Faith	Yamaha	848	(Spain) Joan Cros	14–17
RSR/Fusion Motorsports	Honda	874	(United States) Zack Williams	5–17
Team Yosemite Fire and Security	Yamaha	877	(United States) Anthony Castaneda	17
Storm Lake Honda	Honda	942	(United States) Deegan Hepp	4, 10, 15
Thury Racing by FXR/Schilderwerk Beutha	Yamaha	964	(Germany) Dominique Thury	5, 10, 17
TMR Racing	Kawasaki	976	(United States) Josh Greco	4–17
Lacoste Team	KTM	984	(Brazil) Lucas Dunka	8
Preston Taylor Racing	Kawasaki	996	(United States) Preston Taylor	7, 9, 11, 13, 16

=== Championship Standings ===
Pos	Rider	Bike	ANA (California)	SDI (California)	ANA (California)	GLE (Arizona)	TAM (Florida)	DET (Michigan)	ARL (Texas)	DAY (Florida)	IND (Indiana)	BIR (Alabama)	SEA (Washington (state))	FOX (Massachusetts)	PHI (Pennsylvania)	EAR (New Jersey)	PIT (Pennsylvania)	DEN (Colorado)	SLC (Utah)	Points
1	(United States) Cooper Webb	Yamaha	4	3	8	2	2	1	1	2	1	4	1	3	2	2	1	2	4	365
2	(United States) Chase Sexton	KTM	1	6	4	1	5	3	3	5	3	1	2	6	1	1	2	1	1	363
3	(United States) Justin Cooper	Yamaha	7	11	6	13	4	5	4	4	2	6	6	11	6	4	3	3	3	281
4	(United States) Malcolm Stewart	Husqvarna	10	7	9	10	1	4	9	6	6	2	7	13	4	6	5	4	2	277
5	(Germany) Ken Roczen	Suzuki	2	4	2	3	21	2	2	1	7	5	4	4	3	7	6			271
6	(United States) Aaron Plessinger	KTM	9	Ret	Ret	9	8	9	7	3	5	3	3	1	8	3	4	5	6	255
7	(France) Dylan Ferrandis	Honda	DNQ	9	16	11		8	8	12	8	13	5	10	7	5	7	7	10	194
8	(United States) Justin Hill	KTM	8	14	15	6	10	10	5	7	9	11	10	DNQ	10	10	13	12	8	194
9	(United States) Shane McElrath	Honda	13	17	17	14	9	12	13	11	10	8	14	2	12	8	9	6	9	192
10	(United States) Justin Barcia	Gas Gas	6	8	10	12	6	7	6	10	4	9	8	5	14	18				185
11	(United States) Joey Savatgy	Honda	21	10	11	15	7	13	10	9	Ret			DNQ	5	11	8	8	5	153
12	(United States) Jason Anderson	Kawasaki	3	13	3	7	3	6	11	8	11	7								151
13	(United States) Mitchell Oldenburg	Beta	16	19	13	17	11	14	12	13	12	14	11	20	11	15	11	9	DNQ	134
14	(United States) Colt Nichols	Suzuki	DNQ	18	14	16	12	11	15	15	14	18	12	8	13	13	12	14	12	130
15	(United States) Benny Bloss	Beta	Ret	16	12	19	13	Ret	17	16	13	10	9	7	9	19	Ret	13	Ret	113
16	(United States) Eli Tomac	Yamaha	5	1	7	4	17													80
17	(United States) Kyle Chisholm	Suzuki	20	20	DNQ	18	15	17	20	19	15	16	13	21	18	16	16	16	14	78
18	(Australia) Jett Lawrence	Honda	12	2	1	8														71
19	(United States) Christian Craig	Yamaha										12	15	17	15	12	14	11	11	69
20	(United States) Mitchell Harrison	Kawasaki	17	DNQ	DNQ	22	16	16	16	17	16	19	18	DNQ	16	14	17	DNQ	17	65
21	(Australia) Hunter Lawrence	Honda	11	5	5	5	DNQ													62
22	(United Kingdom) Dean Wilson	Honda													17	9	10	10	7	57
23	(Sweden) Fredrik Norén	Kawasaki	18	DNQ	21	DNQ			DNQ	22	19	DNQ	16	DNQ	21	17	15	15	13	43
24	(United States) Kevin Moranz	KTM	DNQ	21	20	DNQ	19	18	DNQ	21	17	21	19	15	19	DNQ	19	17	18	42
25	(United States) Jerry Robin	Yamaha	DNQ	DNQ	18	DNQ	DNQ	15	14	18	18	15	17	DNQ	DNQ	DNQ				39
26	(United States) Justin Starling	Gas Gas	DNQ	DNQ	DNQ	DNQ	18	21	19	20	DNQ	22	21	14	DNQ	DNQ	DNQ	21	20	22
27	(United States) Grant Harlan	Yamaha	DNQ	DNQ	DNQ	DNQ	DNQ	19	21	DNQ	DNQ	17	DNQ	18	20	Ret	18	DNQ	19	22
28	(United States) Tristan Lane	KTM	DNQ	DNQ	DNQ	DNQ	Ret	DNQ	DNQ	DNQ	DNQ	20	20	12	DNQ	20	DNQ	19	DNQ	19
29	(United States) Jeremy Hand	Honda					20	DNQ	DNQ	DNQ	20	DNQ		19	22	21	20	20	15	19
30	(Spain) Jorge Prado	Kawasaki	14	12	DNQ															18
31	(Venezuela) Anthony Rodríguez	KTM	DNQ	DNQ	DNQ	20	14	20	18	DNQ	21	DNQ	DNQ	Ret	DNQ	DNQ	DNQ	DNQ	21	18
32	(United States) Cade Clason	Kawasaki	DNQ	DNQ	19	21	DNQ								DNQ	DNQ	21	18	16	15
33	(United States) Vince Friese	Honda	15	15																14
34	(United States) Logan Leitzel	Kawasaki					DNQ	DNQ	DNQ	DNQ	DNQ	DNQ	DNQ	9	DNQ	DNQ	DNQ	DNQ	DNQ	13
35	(United States) Coty Schock	Yamaha								14										8
36	(United States) Theodore Pauli	Kawasaki	DNQ	DNQ	DNQ	DNQ	DNQ	DNQ	DNQ	DNQ	DNQ	DNQ	DNQ	16	DNQ	DNQ	DNQ	DNQ	DNQ	6
37	(United States) Ryan Breece	Honda	19							DNQ										3
	(United States) Hunter Schlosser	Honda	DNQ	DNQ	DNQ	DNQ	DNQ	DNQ	DNQ	DNQ	DNQ	DNQ	22	DNQ	DNQ	DNQ	DNQ	DNQ	DNQ	0
	(United States) Scott Meshey	KTM	DNQ	DNQ	DNQ	DNQ	DNQ	DNQ	22	DNQ	DNQ	DNQ	DNQ	DNQ	DNQ	DNQ	DNQ	DNQ	DNQ	0
	(United States) Michael Hicks	Yamaha																22		0
	(United States) Logan Karnow	Kawasaki	DNQ	DNQ	DNQ	DNQ	DNQ	DNQ	DNQ	DNQ	DNQ	DNQ	DNQ	DNQ	DNQ	DNQ	DNQ	DNQ	DNQ	0
	(United States) Austin Cozadd	Yamaha	DNQ	DNQ	DNQ	DNQ	DNQ	DNQ	DNQ	DNQ	DNQ	DNQ	DNQ	DNQ	DNQ	DNQ	DNQ	DNQ		0
	(United States) Justin Rodbell	Honda	DNQ	DNQ	DNQ	DNQ	DNQ	DNQ	DNQ	DNQ	DNQ	DNQ	DNQ		DNQ			DNQ	DNQ	0
	(United States) Bobby Piazza	Yamaha	DNQ	DNQ	DNQ	DNQ	DNQ		DNQ		DNQ	DNQ		DNQ	DNQ	DNQ	DNQ	DNQ	DNQ	0
	(United States) Jared Lesher	Yamaha	DNQ	DNQ	DNQ		DNQ	DNQ	DNQ	DNQ	DNQ	DNQ		DNQ		DNQ	DNQ	DNQ	DNQ	0
	(United States) Josh Greco	Kawasaki				DNQ	DNQ	DNQ	DNQ	DNQ	DNQ	DNQ	DNQ	DNQ	DNQ	DNQ	DNQ	DNQ	DNQ	0
	(United States) Zack Williams	Honda					DNQ	DNQ	DNQ	DNQ	DNQ	DNQ	DNQ	DNQ	DNQ	DNQ	DNQ	DNQ	DNQ	0
	(United States) Colby Copp	Honda	DNQ	DNQ	DNQ	DNQ	DNQ	DNQ	DNQ	DNQ	DNQ	DNQ								0
	(United States) Marshal Weltin	Yamaha	DNQ	DNQ	DNQ						DNQ	DNQ		DNQ	DNQ	DNQ	DNQ	DNQ		0
	(United States) Cory Carsten	Suzuki						DNQ		DNQ	DNQ	DNQ		DNQ	DNQ	DNQ	DNQ			0
	(United States) Cheyenne Harmon	Yamaha								DNQ	DNQ			DNQ	DNQ	DNQ	DNQ	DNQ	DNQ	0
	(United States) Alexander Nagy	Honda	DNQ	DNQ	DNQ	DNQ		DNQ			DNQ									0
	(United States) Joey Desimone	Kawasaki	DNQ	DNQ	DNQ	DNQ			DNQ				DNQ							0
	(United States) Chris Howell	Yamaha			DNQ	DNQ			DNQ				DNQ					DNQ	DNQ	0
	(United States) Nick Laurie	KTM									DNQ	DNQ		DNQ	DNQ	DNQ	DNQ			0
	(United States) Rider Fisher	Kawasaki	DNQ	DNQ	DNQ	DNQ							DNQ							0
	(Australia) Dylan Wood	Honda					DNQ	DNQ	DNQ	DNQ	DNQ									0
	(United States) Preston Taylor	Kawasaki							DNQ		DNQ		DNQ		DNQ			DNQ		0
	(United States) Austin Politelli	Yamaha	DNQ	DNQ									DNQ					DNQ		0
	(United States) Ragan Cochran	Gas Gas				DNQ								DNQ		DNQ	DNQ			0
	(United States) Rylan Munson	Kawasaki					DNQ	DNQ		DNQ	DNQ									0
	(United States) Addison Emory IV	Yamaha					DNQ			DNQ	DNQ				DNQ					0
	(United States) David Pulley	Yamaha										DNQ		DNQ		DNQ	DNQ			0
	(United States) Jack Rogers	Kawasaki											DNQ		DNQ			DNQ	DNQ	0
	(Spain) Joan Cros	Yamaha														DNQ	DNQ	DNQ	DNQ	0
	(United States) Gared Steinke	Husqvarna	DNQ	DNQ	DNQ															0
	(United States) Brandon Ray	Honda		DNQ	DNQ					DNQ										0
	(United States) Deegan Hepp	Honda				DNQ						DNQ					DNQ			0
	(Germany) Dominique Thury	Yamaha					DNQ					DNQ							DNQ	0
	(United States) Kile Epperson	Honda						DNQ	DNQ	DNQ										0
	(United States) Konnor Visger	Honda						DNQ	DNQ		DNQ									0
	(United States) Carter Biese	Kawasaki								DNQ	DNQ	DNQ								0
	(United States) TJ Albright	Yamaha								DNQ		DNQ		DNQ						0
	(United States) Josh Cartwright	Kawasaki										DNQ						DNQ	DNQ	0
	(United States) Johnnie Buller	Husqvarna	DNQ		DNQ															0
	(United States) Justin Aragaki	Husqvarna							DNQ	DNQ										0
	(United States) Todd Bannister	Gas Gas							DNQ									DNQ		0
	(United States) Thomas Welch	KTM							DNQ		DNQ									0
	(United States) Carter Stephenson	Husqvarna									DNQ						DNQ			0
	(United States) Mason Kerr	Honda									DNQ							DNQ		0
	(United States) Slade Varola	Husqvarna										DNQ		DNQ						0
	(United States) Kyle Bitterman	Honda										DNQ		DNQ						0
	(United States) Scotty Wennerstrom	KTM										DNQ		DNQ						0
	(United States) Robert Hailey	Yamaha											DNQ						DNQ	0
	(United States) Ricci Randanella	Kawasaki													DNQ	DNQ				0
	(United States) Luke Dickey	KTM														DNQ	DNQ			0
	(Canada) Julien Benek	Triumph																DNQ	DNQ	0
	(United States) Doug Manhire	Honda		DNQ																0
	(United States) Ryan Carlson	Kawasaki				DNQ														0
	(United States) Chad Saultz	KTM						DNQ												0
	(United States) Henry Miller	Honda							DNQ											0
	(United States) Collin Allen	Yamaha							DNQ											0
	(United States) Chandler Baker	Husqvarna							DNQ											0
	(United States) Brandon Pederson	Kawasaki							DNQ											0
	(Sweden) Anton Nordström Graaf	Yamaha								DNQ										0
	(United States) Ronnie Stewart	Kawasaki								DNQ										0
	(Brazil) Lucas Dunka	KTM								DNQ										0
	(United Kingdom) Matt Bayliss	KTM								DNQ										0
	(United States) Mitchell Zaremba	Yamaha									DNQ									0
	(United States) Mason Morris	KTM									DNQ									0
	(United States) Devin Harriman	KTM											DNQ							0
	(United States) James Harrington	Yamaha													DNQ					0
	(United States) Steve Roman	Kawasaki															DNQ			0
	(United States) Ben Lamay	KTM																DNQ		0
	(United States) Luke Kalaitzian	Kawasaki																	DNQ	0
	(United States) Jackson Gray	Husqvarna																	DNQ	0
	(United States) Anthony Castaneda	Yamaha																	DNQ	0
Pos	Rider	Bike	ANA (California)	SDI (California)	ANA (California)	GLE (Arizona)	TAM (Florida)	DET (Michigan)	ARL (Texas)	DAY (Florida)	IND (Indiana)	BIR (Alabama)	SEA (Washington (state))	FOX (Massachusetts)	PHI (Pennsylvania)	EAR (New Jersey)	PIT (Pennsylvania)	DEN (Colorado)	SLC (Utah)	Points

== 250 SX West ==
=== Entry list ===
Team	Constructor	No	Rider	Rounds
Triumph Factory Racing Team	Triumph	19	(United States) Jordon Smith	1–5, 7–10
Triumph Factory Racing Team	Triumph	325	(United States) Stilez Robertson	1–2
Red Bull KTM Factory Racing	KTM	23	(United States) Julien Beaumer	All
Rockstar Energy Gas Gas Factory Racing	Gas Gas	25	(United States) Ryder DiFrancesco	1–2
Monster Energy Pro Circuit Kawasaki	Kawasaki	26	(United States) Ty Masterpool	2
Monster Energy Pro Circuit Kawasaki	Kawasaki	36	(United States) Garrett Marchbanks	1–2, 4–10
Monster Energy Pro Circuit Kawasaki	Kawasaki	47	(United States) Levi Kitchen	1
Monster Energy Pro Circuit Kawasaki	Kawasaki	98	(United States) Drew Adams	3–4, 9–10
Team Honda HRC Progressive	Honda	30	(Japan) Jo Shimoda	All
Gizmo Mods Rock River Yamaha Racing	Yamaha	35	(United States) Marshal Weltin	4, 7
Gizmo Mods Rock River Yamaha Racing	Yamaha	91	(United States) TJ Albright	All
Gizmo Mods Rock River Yamaha Racing	Yamaha	378	(United States) Kyle Wise	All
Muc-Off FXR ClubMX Yamaha Racing	Yamaha	37	(United States) Coty Schock	All
Muc-Off FXR ClubMX Yamaha Racing	Yamaha	54	(United States) Jett Reynolds	1–6
Monster Energy Yamaha Star Racing	Yamaha	38	(United States) Haiden Deegan	All
Monster Energy Yamaha Star Racing	Yamaha	93	(United States) Michael Mosiman	All
Monster Energy Yamaha Star Racing	Yamaha	100	(New Zealand) Cole Davies	All
Toyota of Redlands BarX Yamaha	Yamaha	44	(United States) Dilan Schwartz	5–7
Toyota of Redlands BarX Yamaha	Yamaha	52	(France) Anthony Bourdon	1–4
Toyota of Redlands BarX Yamaha	Yamaha	166	(Brazil) Enzo Lopes	3–5, 7–10
Toyota of Redlands BarX Yamaha	Yamaha	334	(Australia) Brad West	1–5, 7–9
AEO Powersports KTM Racing	KTM	48	(United States) Talon Hawkins	1–2
AEO Powersports KTM Racing	KTM	65	(United States) Lux Turner	All
AEO Powersports KTM Racing	KTM	134	(United States) Avery Long	1–2, 5–10
AEO Powersports KTM Racing	KTM	775	(United States) CJ Benard	7, 9–10
Team Solitaire Heartbeat Hot Sauce Yamaha	Yamaha	58	(United States) Derek Kelley	1, 3–10
Team Solitaire Heartbeat Hot Sauce Yamaha	Yamaha	61	(Canada) Cole Thompson	1–7, 9–10
Team Solitaire Heartbeat Hot Sauce Yamaha	Yamaha	64	(United States) Robbie Wageman	9–10
Partzilla PRMX Kawasaki	Kawasaki	63	(United States) Hunter Yoder	All
Rides Unlimited Rocky Mountain ATV MC Racing	KTM	67	(United States) Joshua Varize	1–7
Miller Racing	Yamaha	79	(United States) Max Miller	1–5, 7, 9–10
Host Grindstone Friesen Group Racing	Kawasaki	85	(United States) Maxwell Sanford	1–7, 9–10
Host Grindstone Friesen Group Racing	Kawasaki	101	(New Zealand) Dylan Walsh	All
MRPSBR Husqvarna Racing	Husqvarna	99	(United States) Brock Bennett	All
MRPSBR Husqvarna Racing	Husqvarna	155	(United States) Dylan Cunha	All
MRPSBR Husqvarna Racing	Husqvarna	805	(United States) Slade Varola	All
KB Academy	Husqvarna	108	(France) Kévin Ballanger	1–2
Team Privateer Paddock	Yamaha	113	(United States) Braden Spangle	1–4, 7
Team Privateer Paddock	Yamaha	289	(United States) Robert Hailey	1–5, 9
Team Privateer Paddock	Suzuki	952	(France) Ludovic Macler	1–4
Phoenix Racing Honda	Honda	115	(United States) Gavin Towers	All
Phoenix Racing Honda	Honda	751	(United States) Evan Ferry	1
Harriman Concepts	KTM	116	(United States) Devin Harriman	1–3
Firefly/Mountain Movers/Coal Train Jones Powersports Yamaha	Yamaha	118	(United States) Cheyenne Harmon	2, 5
Gear Services	Kawasaki	119	(United States) Logan Boye	1
Smell Good Athlete	Yamaha	121	(United States) Chris Howell	1–2
SLR Honda	Honda	132	(United States) Billy Laninovich	1–4
SLR Honda	Honda	302	(United States) Parker Ross	1–7, 9
DPMX/OnlyFans Racing	Yamaha	138	(United States) David Pulley	1–4, 6, 8–10
Desert Crown Racing	Kawasaki	147	(United States) Ryan Carlson	1–2
Gaskin Service/Gator Wraps Racing	Gas Gas	175	(United States) Kaden Lewis	1–5
	Yamaha	214	(Canada) Tyler Gibbs	7
SKVI	Yamaha	246	(United States) Chance Blackburn	7
Becker Racing	KTM	260	(Germany) Nico Koch	2–4
	Yamaha	279	(United States) Wyatt Mattson	1–5, 7
The McGinley Clinic Privateer Support Program	Triumph	280	(United States) Jack Beeland	1–5, 7, 9
US 27 Motorsports	Honda	299	(United States) Konnor Visger	1–4
3Bros Hatch Racing Husqvarna	Husqvarna	310	(United States) Kai Aiello	1, 3, 5, 9
Ty Freehill Racing	KTM	316	(United States) Ty Freehill	1–3, 7, 9
	Kawasaki	343	(United States) Carter Biese	1–4, 7, 9
ARACOM Racing	Husqvarna	344	(United States) Justin Aragaki	1–4, 9
K&M Rebar Legacy Honda	Honda	349	(United States) Kile Epperson	1–4
Barboa Racing	Yamaha	357	(United States) Kameron Barboa	9
Raylentless Racing	Honda	388	(United States) Brandon Ray	4–7, 9–10
RG Racing	Kawasaki	425	(United States) Reven Gordon	1–3, 5, 9
AP3 Rad Suzuki	Suzuki	446	(United States) Blaine Silveira	1
Dream Chasers Racing	Yamaha	461	(United States) Hayden Robinson	1–3, 5
Dream Chasers Racing	Yamaha	667	(Sweden) Anton Nordström Graaf	5
Experience Powersports	Yamaha	476	(United States) Collin Jurin	1–3, 7
RJC4 Racing	Gas Gas	490	(United States) Ragan Cochran	8
International Triumph Racing	Triumph	500	(Canada) Julien Benek	3–4, 7
International Triumph Racing	Triumph	585	(Canada) Blake Davies	1–4, 7, 9
Galaxy Cloaking/Cardinal Revenue Solutions/Turn One Powersports KTM	KTM	501	(United States) Scotty Wennerstrom	1–9
	KTM	551	(Canada) Guillaume St-Cyr	1–4
Bar Aviation Racing	Yamaha	565	(Uganda) Stav Orland	1–4, 7, 9–10
KTR Moto	Honda	597	(United States) Mason Kerr	1–5
Kalaitzian Brothers Racing	Kawasaki	636	(United States) Luke Kalaitzian	1, 7, 9
Monkey Business Racing	Gas Gas	758	(United States) Thomas Ralston	1, 3–5, 9
AJE Motorsports Gas Gas	Gas Gas	800	(Canada) Preston Masciangelo	1–7
	KTM	858	(France) Clément Briatte	3–4
Team Yosemite Fire and Security	Yamaha	877	(United States) Anthony Castaneda	1–5, 7, 9
Storm Lake Honda	Honda	942	(United States) Deegan Hepp	1–3, 5–6
Smartop MotoConcepts Honda Racing	Honda	943	(Canada) Noah Viney	1–2
Thury Racing by FXR/Schilderwerk Beutha	Yamaha	964	(Germany) Dominique Thury	1–7, 9
TMR Racing	Kawasaki	976	(United States) Josh Greco	1–3

=== Championship Standings ===
Pos	Rider	Bike	ANA (California)	SDI (California)	ANA (California)	GLE (Arizona)	ARL (Texas)	IND (Indiana)	SEA (Washington (state))	PHI (Pennsylvania)	DEN (Colorado)	SLC (Utah)	Points
1	(United States) Haiden Deegan	Yamaha	5	3	1	2	1	3	3	2	1	1	221
2	(United States) Julien Beaumer	KTM	2	1	2	4	6	8	4	12	2	2	189
3	(New Zealand) Cole Davies	Yamaha	8	4	3	3	7	5	1	1	5	DNQ	171
4	(Japan) Jo Shimoda	Honda	1	7	6	10	4	6	5	5	9	8	163
5	(United States) Garrett Marchbanks	Kawasaki	9	8		6	5	9	2	7	3	7	145
6	(United States) Coty Schock	Yamaha	6	6	5	8	2	17	8	11	6	9	144
7	(United States) Michael Mosiman	Yamaha	15	9	7	5	3	15	6	18	7	5	131
8	(United States) Jordon Smith	Triumph	3	2	4	1	22		12	9	4	DNQ	126
9	(United States) Hunter Yoder	Kawasaki	13	10	10	14	11	18	13	19	17	17	78
10	(United States) Lux Turner	KTM	11	Ret	11	11	9	16	11	DNQ	20	16	71
11	(Canada) Cole Thompson	Yamaha	10	12	DNQ	19	13	DNQ	9		11	DNQ	58
12	(Brazil) Enzo Lopes	Yamaha			17	DNQ	8		7	13	10	20	57
13	(United States) Parker Ross	Honda	17	15	12	9	14	DNQ	14		16		57
14	(France) Anthony Bourdon	Yamaha	7	11	9	7							54
15	(United States) Gavin Towers	Honda	19	18	15	22	17	20	10	20	14	19	46
16	(New Zealand) Dylan Walsh	Kawasaki	DNQ	19	18	15	12	DNQ	15	DNQ	12	DNQ	41
17	(United States) Drew Adams	Kawasaki			8	DNS					8	10	40
18	(United States) TJ Albright	Yamaha	14	16	14	12	19	DNQ	21	DNQ	DNQ	DNQ	36
19	(United States) Ryder DiFrancesco	Gas Gas	4	5									35
20	(United States) Jett Reynolds	Yamaha	22	13	13	18	10	Ret					34
21	(United States) Avery Long	KTM	12	DNQ			18	DNQ	16	DNQ	13	DNQ	29
22	(Australia) Brad West	Yamaha	DNQ	14	DNQ	20	DNQ		19	DNQ	18		17
23	(United States) Joshua Varize	KTM	21	20	19	16	20	DNQ	DNQ				14
24	(United States) Derek Kelley	Yamaha	DNQ		DNQ	17	DNQ	DNQ	17	DNQ	19	DNQ	13
25	(Germany) Dominique Thury	Yamaha	DNQ	DNQ	16	DNQ	16	DNQ	DNQ		DNQ		12
26	(United States) Marshal Weltin	Yamaha				13			DNQ				9
27	(United States) Max Miller	Yamaha	16	DNQ	DNQ	DNQ	DNQ		20		DNQ	DNQ	8
28	(United States) Dilan Schwartz	Yamaha					15	DNQ	DNQ				7
29	(United States) Robbie Wageman	Yamaha									15	DNQ	7
30	(Germany) Nico Koch	KTM		17	DNQ	DNQ							5
31	(Uganda) Stav Orland	Yamaha	DNQ	DNQ	DNQ	DNQ			18		DNQ	DNQ	4
32	(Canada) Noah Viney	Honda	18	DNQ									4
33	(United States) Collin Jurin	Yamaha	DNQ	DNQ	20				DNQ				2
34	(United States) Stilez Robertson	Triumph	20	DNQ									2
35	(Canada) Preston Masciangelo	Gas Gas	DNQ	DNQ	21	DNQ	DNQ	DNQ	DNQ				1
36	(United States) Billy Laninovich	Honda	DNQ	DNQ	DNQ	21							1
37	(United States) CJ Benard	KTM							DNQ		21	DNQ	1
38	(United States) Ty Masterpool	Kawasaki		21									1
39	(Sweden) Anton Nordström Graaf	Yamaha					21						1
	(United States) Maxwell Sanford	Kawasaki	DNQ	DNQ	22	DNQ	DNQ	DNQ	DNQ		22	DNQ	0
	(United States) Brandon Ray	Honda				DNQ	DNQ	DNQ	Ret		DNQ	DNQ	0
	(United States) Brock Bennett	Husqvarna	DNQ	DNQ	DNQ	DNQ	DNQ	DNQ	DNQ	DNQ	DNQ	DNQ	0
	(United States) Slade Varola	Husqvarna	DNQ	DNQ	DNQ	DNQ	DNQ	DNQ	DNQ	DNQ	DNQ	DNQ	0
	(United States) Kyle Wise	Yamaha	DNQ	DNQ	DNQ	DNQ	DNQ	DNQ	DNQ	DNQ	DNQ	DNQ	0
	(United States) Dylan Cunha	Husqvarna	DNQ	DNQ	DNQ	DNQ	DNQ	DNQ	DNQ	DNQ	DNQ	DNQ	0
	(United States) Scotty Wennerstrom	KTM	DNQ	DNQ	DNQ	DNQ	DNQ	DNQ	DNQ	DNQ	DNQ		0
	(United States) David Pulley	Yamaha	DNQ	DNQ	DNQ	DNQ		DNQ		DNQ	DNQ	DNQ	0
	(United States) Anthony Castaneda	Yamaha	DNQ	DNQ	DNQ	DNQ	DNQ		DNQ		DNQ		0
	(United States) Jack Beeland	Triumph	DNQ	DNQ	DNQ	DNQ	DNQ		DNQ		DNQ		0
	(United States) Wyatt Mattson	Yamaha	DNQ	DNQ	DNQ	DNQ	DNQ		DNQ				0
	(Canada) Blake Davies	Triumph	DNQ	DNQ	DNQ	DNQ			DNQ		DNQ		0
	(United States) Robert Hailey	Yamaha	DNQ	DNQ	DNQ	DNQ	DNQ				DNQ		0
	(United States) Carter Biese	Kawasaki	DNQ	DNQ	DNQ	DNQ			DNQ		DNQ		0
	(United States) Mason Kerr	Honda	DNQ	DNQ	DNQ	DNQ	DNQ						0
	(United States) Kaden Lewis	Gas Gas	DNQ	DNQ	DNQ	DNQ	DNQ						0
	(United States) Braden Spangle	Yamaha	DNQ	DNQ	DNQ	DNQ			DNQ				0
	(United States) Justin Aragaki	Husqvarna	DNQ	DNQ	DNQ	DNQ					DNQ		0
	(United States) Deegan Hepp	Honda	DNQ	DNQ	DNQ		DNQ	DNQ					0
	(United States) Reven Gordon	Kawasaki	DNQ	DNQ	DNQ		DNQ				DNQ		0
	(United States) Ty Freehill	KTM	DNQ	DNQ	DNQ				DNQ		DNQ		0
	(United States) Thomas Ralston	Gas Gas	DNQ		DNQ	DNQ	DNQ				DNQ		0
	(France) Ludovic Macler	Suzuki	DNQ	DNQ	DNQ	DNQ							0
	(United States) Kile Epperson	Honda	DNQ	DNQ	DNQ	DNQ							0
	(United States) Konnor Visger	Honda	DNQ	DNQ	DNQ	DNQ							0
	(Canada) Guillaume St-Cyr	KTM	DNQ	DNQ	DNQ	DNQ							0
	(United States) Hayden Robinson	Yamaha	DNQ	DNQ	DNQ		DNQ						0
	(United States) Kai Aiello	Husqvarna	DNQ		DNQ		DNQ				DNQ		0
	(United States) Devin Harriman	KTM	DNQ	DNQ	DNQ								0
	(United States) Josh Greco	Kawasaki	DNQ	DNQ	DNQ								0
	(United States) Luke Kalaitzian	Kawasaki	DNQ						DNQ		DNQ		0
	(Canada) Julien Benek	Triumph			DNQ	DNQ			DNQ				0
	(United States) Talon Hawkins	KTM	DNQ	DNQ									0
	(France) Kévin Ballanger	Husqvarna	DNQ	DNQ									0
	(United States) Chris Howell	Yamaha	DNQ	DNQ									0
	(United States) Ryan Carlson	Kawasaki	DNQ	DNQ									0
	(United States) Cheyenne Harmon	Yamaha		DNQ			DNQ						0
	(France) Clément Briatte	KTM			DNQ	DNQ							0
	(United States) Evan Ferry	Honda	DNQ										0
	(United States) Blaine Silveira	Suzuki	DNQ										0
	(United States) Levi Kitchen	Kawasaki	DNQ										0
	(United States) Logan Boye	Kawasaki	DNQ										0
	(Canada) Tyler Gibbs	Yamaha							DNQ				0
	(United States) Chance Blackburn	Yamaha							DNQ				0
	(United States) Ragan Cochran	Gas Gas								DNQ			0
	(United States) Kameron Barboa	Yamaha									DNQ		0
Pos	Rider	Bike	ANA (California)	SDI (California)	ANA (California)	GLE (Arizona)	ARL (Texas)	IND (Indiana)	SEA (Washington (state))	PHI (Pennsylvania)	DEN (Colorado)	SLC (Utah)	Points

== 250 SX East ==
=== Entry list ===
Team	Constructor	No	Rider	Rounds
Red Bull KTM Factory Racing	KTM	1	(France) Tom Vialle	All
Team Honda HRC Progressive	Honda	10	(United States) Chance Hymas	All
Monster Energy Yamaha Star Racing	Yamaha	20	(United States) Pierce Brown	1
Monster Energy Yamaha Star Racing	Yamaha	31	(United Kingdom) Max Anstie	1–5
Monster Energy Yamaha Star Racing	Yamaha	34	(United States) Daxton Bennick	1, 3–7
Monster Energy Yamaha Star Racing	Yamaha	41	(United States) Nate Thrasher	All
Rockstar Energy Husqvarna Factory Racing	Husqvarna	24	(United States) RJ Hampshire	All
Phoenix Racing Honda	Honda	39	(United States) Nick Romano	1–2, 5–6
Phoenix Racing Honda	Honda	59	(United States) Cullin Park	All
MRPSBR Husqvarna Racing	Husqvarna	42	(Estonia) Harri Kullas	1–2
MRPSBR Husqvarna Racing	Husqvarna	401	(United States) Blake Gardner	1–4
MRPSBR Husqvarna Racing	Husqvarna	734	(United States) Dayton Briggs	6–10
Monster Energy Pro Circuit Kawasaki	Kawasaki	47	(United States) Levi Kitchen	1–3
Monster Energy Pro Circuit Kawasaki	Kawasaki	50	(United States) Cameron McAdoo	1–3
Monster Energy Pro Circuit Kawasaki	Kawasaki	56	(United States) Seth Hammaker	All
Storm Lake Honda Buddy Brooks Racing	Honda	55	(United States) Henry Miller	All
Storm Lake Honda Buddy Brooks Racing	Honda	682	(United States) Izaih Clark	All
QuadLock Honda Racing	Honda	60	(United States) Carson Mumford	1–5
Muc-Off FXR ClubMX Yamaha Racing	Yamaha	62	(United States) Mark Fineis	1–3
Muc-Off FXR ClubMX Yamaha Racing	Yamaha	88	(United States) Devin Simonson	8–10
Muc-Off FXR ClubMX Yamaha Racing	Yamaha	92	(United States) Maximus Vohland	All
Partzilla Blaster Power PRMX Kawasaki	Kawasaki	62	(United States) Mark Fineis	6–9
Partzilla Blaster Power PRMX Kawasaki	Kawasaki	73	(United States) Preston Boespflug	1–4
Partzilla Blaster Power PRMX Kawasaki	Kawasaki	192	(United States) Jack Chambers	All
Wildcat Race Team	Gas Gas	74	(Venezuela) Lorenzo Locurcio	1–3, 5
Wildcat Race Team	Gas Gas	81	(Denmark) Matti Jørgensen	3–4, 9
The Dirt Bike Depot WMR KTM	KTM	75	(United States) Gage Linville	1–3, 5–7
The Dirt Bike Depot WMR KTM	KTM	105	(South Africa) Marcus Phelps	1–8
The Dirt Bike Depot WMR KTM	KTM	128	(United States) Chase Marquier	3
The Dirt Bike Depot WMR KTM	KTM	142	(United States) Crockett Myers	1–9
TiLube Honda	Honda	82	(United States) Ryder Floyd	1–3, 5–10
TiLube Honda	Honda	89	(United States) Trevor Colip	All
TiLube Honda	Honda	174	(United States) Luca Marsalisi	1–5
TiLube Honda	Honda	235	(United States) Patrick Murphy	1–3
Triumph Factory Racing Team	Triumph	83	(United States) Austin Forkner	All
Muñoz Racing	Yamaha	87	(Chile) Hardy Muñoz	All
Gizmo Mods Rock River Yamaha Racing	Yamaha	97	(United States) Bryce Shelly	All
Gizmo Mods Rock River Yamaha Racing	Yamaha	143	(United States) Jaxen Driskell	All
Neese Racing	Honda	125	(United States) Luke Neese	1–9
Broke Back Pocket Racing	Kawasaki	129	(United States) Lane Shaw	5–6, 8–9
Allen Racing	Yamaha	135	(United States) Collin Allen	1–3, 5–6, 8–9
HBI Racing	KTM	137	(United States) Ayden Shive	1–9
HBI Racing	KTM	427	(United States) Cole Bradford	1–9
Team Next Level Racing	Honda	148	(United States) Justin Rodbell	6, 8–9
	Yamaha	151	(United States) Aidan Dickens	5–6
Zaremba Racing	Yamaha	183	(United States) Mitchell Zaremba	1–3, 9
Triangle Cycles	Yamaha	188	(United States) Hamden Hudson	1–2
Noowell All Balls Racing EBR Yamaha	Yamaha	188	(United States) Hamden Hudson	3–9
Noowell All Balls Racing EBR Yamaha	Yamaha	468	(United States) Michael Hicks	3–6, 8
Noowell All Balls Racing EBR Yamaha	Yamaha	483	(United States) Bryton Carroll	1–9
SPR	Honda	195	(United States) Lance Kobusch	1–6, 8–9
The McGinley Clinic Privateer Support Program	KTM	197	(United States) Brian Saunier	1–3, 5–9
The McGinley Clinic Privateer Support Program	Husqvarna	420	(United States) Jackson Gray	1–3, 5, 9
The McGinley Clinic Privateer Support Program	KTM	504	(Honduras) Gerhard Matamoros	1–3, 5–6, 8–9
Raymond Racing	Gas Gas	239	(United States) Bryson Raymond	1–3, 5
Jones Racing	Honda	253	(United States) Nick Jones	3
FrederickTown Yamaha	Yamaha	268	(United States) Gage Stine	1–3, 6, 8–9
Carsten Racing	Suzuki	281	(United States) Cory Carsten	1
Mx6 Racing	Yamaha	314	(United States) Tyler Stepek	3
Moto Nation Kwikset Suzuki	Suzuki	315	(United States) Cody Groves	9
Charlie T's Crawfish	Gas Gas	346	(United States) Charles Tolleson IV	1–3, 5–6, 8–9
Turn One Powersports Husqvarna	Husqvarna	350	(United States) Chandler Baker	1–9
Jack Rogers Racing	Kawasaki	351	(United States) Jack Rogers	1–6, 8–9
Rides Unlimited Rocky Mountain ATV MC Racing	KTM	364	(United States) Chad Saultz	1
Rides Unlimited Rocky Mountain ATV MC Racing	KTM	526	(United States) Nick Laurie	1–3, 10
Welch Racing	KTM	376	(United States) Thomas Welch	1–3, 5–9
Mosites Motorsports	Kawasaki	437	(United States) Vinny Luhovey	1–3, 5–9
Randanella Racing	Kawasaki	489	(United States) Ricci Randanella	1, 6
Snirt Racing	Yamaha	544	(United States) Noah Wilbrandt	3, 5
CCR Racing	Yamaha	573	(United States) Christopher Blackmer	1–5
Stan Benson	Kawasaki	672	(United States) Brandon Pederson	1–5
Fitch Racing Inc	Yamaha	676	(United States) Robert Fitch	3, 5
Usko Racing	KTM	689	(United States) Tony Usko	1–6, 8
McLing Racing	Gas Gas	690	(United States) Michael McLing	5
Tech Service Racing	Yamaha	777	(United States) James Harrington	3, 6, 8–9
Dickey Racing	KTM	812	(United States) Luke Dickey	1, 3, 6
Ripper 822	Husqvarna	822	(United States) Riley Ripper	1–3
Stephenson Racing	Husqvarna	824	(United States) Carter Stephenson	1, 3, 5
Lasting Impressions CG LLC	Honda	873	(United States) Ronnie Orres	5–9
	Yamaha	944	(United States) Derek Leatherman	8
Yankton Motorsports	Kawasaki	996	(United States) Preston Taylor	3, 5–6, 8–10

=== Championship Standings ===
Pos	Rider	Bike	TAM (Florida)	DET (Michigan)	DAY (Florida)	IND (Indiana)	BIR (Alabama)	FOX (Massachusetts)	PHI (Pennsylvania)	EAR (New Jersey)	PIT (Pennsylvania)	SLC (Utah)	Points
1	(France) Tom Vialle	KTM	5	4	2	2	3	22	6	3	1	3	180
2	(United States) Seth Hammaker	Kawasaki	4	17	3	1	4	9	4	1	5	4	177
3	(United States) RJ Hampshire	Husqvarna	18	3	1	4	2	14	3	2	4	6	173
4	(United States) Nate Thrasher	Yamaha	8	5	8	14	1	19	14	5	2	13	137
5	(United States) Cullin Park	Honda	7	11	9	13	8	2	15	4	7	15	131
6	(United States) Chance Hymas	Honda	6	6	4	21	7	1	10	Ret	6	11	130
7	(United States) Maximus Vohland	Yamaha	21	9	5	10	6	18	8	6	3	12	120
8	(United States) Henry Miller	Honda	11	10	12	DNQ	12	13	17	8	8	DNQ	85
9	(United Kingdom) Max Anstie	Yamaha	1	2	6	7	DNS						78
10	(United States) Daxton Bennick	Yamaha	2		7	11	5	5	DNS				77
11	(United States) Austin Forkner	Triumph	17	7	17	12	10	DNQ	16	7	15	Ret	75
12	(Chile) Hardy Muñoz	Yamaha	13	12	10	DNQ	9	DNQ	21	DNQ	17	14	58
13	(United States) Carson Mumford	Honda	10	8	11	19	11						51
14	(United States) Trevor Colip	Honda	16	13	16	DNQ	22	11	DNQ	11	14	DNQ	51
15	(United States) Jack Chambers	Kawasaki	19	15	13	DNQ	DNQ	7	DNQ	13	18	21	48
16	(United States) Lance Kobusch	Honda	14	DNQ	DNQ	DNQ	15	6		16	16		43
17	(United States) Gage Linville	Gas Gas	12	14	20		20	3					42
18	(United States) Levi Kitchen	Kawasaki	9	1	21								39
19	(United States) Justin Rodbell	Honda						4		15	13		34
20	(United States) Devin Simonson	Yamaha								9	9	18	30
21	(United States) Izaih Clark	Honda	DNQ	21	15	DNQ	DNQ	DNQ	DNQ	12	11	DNQ	29
22	(United States) Luke Neese	Honda	15	DNQ	DNQ	DNQ	16	DNQ	DNQ	10	Ret		25
23	(United States) Cameron McAdoo	Kawasaki	3	Ret	DNS								20
24	(United States) Mark Fineis	Yamaha	DNQ	18	DNQ								20
24	(United States) Mark Fineis	Kawasaki						8	DNQ	20	DNQ		20
25	(United States) Bryce Shelly	Yamaha	DNQ	DNQ	DNQ	DNQ	DNQ	DNQ	DNQ	14	10	DNQ	20
26	(Venezuela) Lorenzo Locurcio	Gas Gas	DNQ	16	DNQ		14						14
27	(United States) Ayden Shive	KTM	DNQ	20	DNQ	DNQ	DNQ	21	DNQ	DNQ	12		13
28	(United States) Michael Hicks	Yamaha			19	DNQ	13	DNQ		21			13
29	(United States) Preston Taylor	Kawasaki			DNQ		DNQ	10		DNQ	DNQ	DNQ	12
30	(United States) Chandler Baker	Husqvarna	DNQ	DNQ	14	DNQ	DNQ	DNQ	DNQ	19	DNQ		11
31	(United States) Ricci Randanella	Kawasaki	DNQ					12					10
32	(United States) Crockett Myers	KTM	DNQ	DNQ	DNQ	DNQ	18	16	DNQ	DNQ	DNQ		10
33	(United States) Vinny Luhovey	Kawasaki	DNQ	DNQ	DNQ		DNQ	15	DNQ	DNQ	20		9
34	(United States) Hamden Hudson	Yamaha	DNQ	DNQ	DNQ	DNQ	17	20	DNQ	DNQ	DNQ		7
35	(United States) Jack Rogers	Kawasaki	DNQ	DNQ	DNQ	DNQ	DNQ	DNQ		18	19		7
36	(United States) Lane Shaw	Kawasaki					21	DNQ		17	DNQ		6
37	(United States) Dayton Briggs	Husqvarna						17	DNQ	DNQ	DNQ	DNQ	5
38	(United States) Chase Marquier	KTM			18								4
39	(United States) Preston Boespflug	Kawasaki	Ret	19	DNQ	DNQ							3
40	(United States) Nick Romano	Honda	DNQ	DNQ			19	DNQ					3
41	(United States) Pierce Brown	Yamaha	20										2
42	(Denmark) Matti Jørgensen	Gas Gas			DNQ	DNQ					21		1
	(United States) Jaxen Driskell	Yamaha	DNQ	DNQ	DNQ	DNQ	DNQ	DNQ	DNQ	DNQ	DNQ	DNQ	0
	(United States) Bryton Carroll	Yamaha	DNQ	DNQ	DNQ	DNQ	DNQ	DNQ	DNQ	DNQ	DNQ		0
	(United States) Cole Bradford	KTM	DNQ	DNQ	DNQ	DNQ	DNQ	DNQ	DNQ	DNQ	DNQ		0
	(United States) Ryder Floyd	Honda	DNQ	DNQ	DNQ		DNQ	DNQ	DNQ	DNQ	DNQ	DNQ	0
	(South Africa) Marcus Phelps	KTM	DNQ	DNQ	DNQ	DNQ	DNQ	DNQ	DNQ	DNQ			0
	(United States) Tony Usko	KTM	DNQ	DNQ	DNQ	DNQ	DNQ	DNQ		DNQ	DNQ		0
	(United States) Thomas Welch	KTM	DNQ	DNQ	DNQ		DNQ	DNQ	DNQ	DNQ	DNQ		0
	(United States) Brian Saunier	KTM	DNQ	DNQ	DNQ		DNQ	DNQ	DNQ	DNQ	DNQ		0
	(United States) Collin Allen	Yamaha	DNQ	DNQ	DNQ		DNQ	DNQ		DNQ	DNQ		0
	(United States) Charles Tolleson IV	Gas Gas	DNQ	DNQ	DNQ		DNQ	DNQ		DNQ	DNQ		0
	(Honduras) Gerhard Matamoros	KTM	DNQ	DNQ	DNQ		DNQ	DNQ		DNQ	DNQ		0
	(United States) Gage Stine	Yamaha	DNQ	DNQ	DNQ			DNQ		DNQ	DNQ		0
	(United States) Luca Marsalisi	Honda	DNQ	DNQ	DNQ	DNQ	DNQ						0
	(United States) Christopher Blackmer	Yamaha	DNQ	DNQ	DNQ	DNQ	DNQ						0
	(United States) Brandon Pederson	Kawasaki	DNQ	DNQ	DNQ	DNQ	DNQ						0
	(United States) Jackson Gray	Husqvarna	DNQ	DNQ	DNQ		DNQ				DNQ		0
	(United States) Ronnie Orres	Honda					DNQ	DNQ	DNQ	DNQ	DNQ		0
	(United States) Blake Gardner	Husqvarna	DNQ	DNQ	DNQ	DNQ							0
	(United States) Bryson Raymond	Gas Gas	DNQ	DNQ	DNQ		DNQ						0
	(United States) Mitchell Zaremba	Yamaha	DNQ	DNQ	DNQ						DNQ		0
	(United States) Nick Laurie	KTM	DNQ	DNQ	DNQ							DNQ	0
	(United States) James Harrington	Yamaha			DNQ			DNQ		DNQ	DNQ		0
	(United States) Patrick Murphy	Honda	DNQ	DNQ	DNQ								0
	(United States) Riley Ripper	Husqvarna	DNQ	DNQ	DNQ								0
	(United States) Carter Stephenson	Husqvarna	DNQ		DNQ		DNQ						0
	(United States) Luke Dickey	KTM	DNQ		DNQ			DNQ					0
	(Estonia) Harri Kullas	Husqvarna	DNQ	DNQ									0
	(United States) Noah Willbrandt	Yamaha			DNQ		DNQ						0
	(United States) Robert Fitch	Yamaha			DNQ		DNQ						0
	(United States) Aidan Dickens	Yamaha					DNQ	DNQ					0
	(United States) Cory Carsten	Suzuki	DNQ										0
	(United States) Chad Saultz	KTM	DNQ										0
	(United States) Tyler Stepek	Yamaha			DNQ								0
	(United States) Nick Jones	Honda			DNQ								0
	(United States) Michael McLing	Gas Gas					DNQ						0
	(United States) Derek Leatherman	Yamaha								DNQ			0
	(United States) Cody Groves	Suzuki									DNQ		0
Pos	Rider	Bike	TAM (Florida)	DET (Michigan)	DAY (Florida)	IND (Indiana)	BIR (Alabama)	FOX (Massachusetts)	PHI (Pennsylvania)	EAR (New Jersey)	PIT (Pennsylvania)	SLC (Utah)	Points
