= Adam Cianciarulo =

American motorcycle racer

- Nationality: American
- Born: October 20, 1996 (age 30) Port Orange, Florida

Motocross career
- Years active: 2013–2024
- Teams: •Team Green/Pro Circuit/Monster Energy Kawasaki (2004-2024)
- Championships: •2019 AMA Motocross 250cc
- Wins: •AMA 250cc Supercross: 11; •AMA 250cc Motocross: 7; •AMA 450cc Motocross: 2

Adam Cianciarulo (born October 20, 1996) is an American retired professional motocross and supercross racer. He competed in the AMA Motocross Championships from 2013 to 2024. Cianciarulo is notable for winning the 2019 AMA Motocross 250cc Championship.

== Amateur career ==
Cianciarulo began riding motorcycles when he was three years old and was racing when he was four years old. In 2012, he became the highest winning mini bike rider in AMA Amateur Motocross National Championships. He won 11 amateur championships.

== Professional career ==
=== 2013 ===
In 2013, Cianciarulo began his first pro season on Monster Energy/Pro Circuit/Kawasaki, whom he signed a long-term contract with while he was an amateur. After being sick with salmonella, he missed the first four rounds of the Lucas Oil Pro Motocross series. he began his pro career by finishing inside the top-ten five times, including a podium in the first moto at Utah.

=== 2014 ===
In 2014, Cianciarulo began his first 250 Monster Energy Supercross series, winning three out of the first five races including his supercross debut. He received a shoulder injury in Toronto, Canada, after crashing in the whoops section. He had surgery to repair the injury, causing him to miss the rest of the Monster Energy Supercross series as well as the entire Lucas Oil Pro Motocross season.

=== 2015 ===
In 2015, Cianciarulo did not race any races in the Monster Energy Supercross series because of another shoulder injury that he received while racing at the Geneva Supercross in Switzerland. He raced only 6 of the 12 races in the Lucas Oil Pro Motocross series due to another shoulder injury that he received while practicing for Red Bud. Cianciarulo was having a somewhat successful year, getting on the podium once before his injury.

=== 2016 ===
In 2016, it looked like it was going to be a fresh start for Cianciarulo. He parted way with his longtime trainer, Aldon Baker, and has started a new program. Early February, Monster Energy/ Pro Circuit/ Kawasaki reported that Cianciarulo had broken his wrist while practicing. This caused him to miss the entire Monster Energy Supercross series. Cianciarulo was healthy in time for the Lucas Oil Pro Motocross series, and finally finished a full season. He ended the year with six overall top-tens, landing on a moto podium once.

=== 2017 ===
In 2017, Cianciarulo finally had the breakout year proving he still had the speed he showed in 2014. He raced the entire Monster Energy Supercross and Lucas Oil Pro Motocross series, the first time in his career he had done so. In supercross, he earned two race wins; at his "Home" race at Daytona and the series finale in Las Vegas. In Pro Motocross, Cianciarulo earned his first career overall at Budds Creek.

=== 2018 ===
In 2018, Cianciarulo had another successful Supercross season, finishing on the podium seven times and getting one win at the series finale in Las Vegas. He announced on the podium in Las Vegas that he would miss the entire Lucas Oil Pro Motocross series to have surgery on a torn ACL and MCL that he suffered in Indianapolis in 2017.

=== 2019 ===
In 2019, in Glendale, Cianciarulo earned his seventh career win during his time in the series and his first win of the 2019 season. He came close to winning the 250sx West championship, finishing the season with six podiums and five wins, but ultimately lost the championship to Dylan Ferrandis after a crash late in the final race.

However, Cianciarulo later won his first professional championship in the 2019 Lucas Oil Pro Motocross Series finishing with 519 total points. He then was contracted to ride for Team Monster Energy Kawasaki aboard a KX450 in the 450 class. He also moved on from his previous career number 92 to 9.

During the 2019 Monster Energy Cup, Cianciarulo's first professional race in the 450 class, he placed first overall. In the three main events, Cianciarulo placed second, second, and first to solidify his spot at the top of the podium.

=== 2020 ===
Cianciarulo broke his collarbone during the first round of qualifying at the 2020 Arlington Supercross event. He underwent surgery days after the injury and would race again when healthy.

== AMA Supercross/Motocross Results ==
Year	Rnd 1	Rnd 2	Rnd 3	Rnd 4	Rnd 5	Rnd 6	Rnd 7	Rnd 8	Rnd 9	Rnd 10	Rnd 11	Rnd 12	Rnd 13	Rnd 14	Rnd 15	Rnd 16	Rnd 17	Average Finish	Podium Percent	Place
2013 250 MX	OUT	OUT	OUT	OUT	16	9	12	10	11	15	4	18	-	-	-	-	-	11.88	-	16th
2014 250 SX-E	-	-	-	-	-	-	1	2	1	2	1	22	OUT	-	-	OUT	OUT	4.83	83%	5th
2015 250 MX	8	10	3	4	6	6	OUT	OUT	OUT	OUT	OUT	OUT	-	-	-	-	-	6.17	17%	14th
2016 250 MX	13	11	14	10	16	6	14	6	6	11	4	5	-	-	-	-	-	9.67	-	8th
2017 250 SX-E	-	-	-	-	-	-	5	7	2	1	5	3	6	-	-	4	1	3.78	44%	2nd
2017 250 MX	4	4	14	9	4	11	10	5	4	6	1	2	-	-	-	-	-	6.17	17%	3rd
~2018 250 SX-W	3	7	4	3	7	2	-	-	-	-	-	2	3	-	-	2	1	3.40	70%	2nd
2019 250 SX-W	5	1	5	1	1	-	-	-	2	-	-	2	4	-	1	-	20	4.20	60%	2nd
2019 250 MX	1	1	1	1	3	1	2	1	2	2	2	3	-	-	-	-	-	1.67	100%	1st
2020 450 MX	12	2	3	5	1	1	4	2	3	-	-	-	-	-	-	-	-	3.67	67%	2nd
