= Red Bud MX =

Race track in Buchanan, Michigan

Coordinates: 41.8714°N 86.37°W

Red Bud MX is a US motocross race track in Buchanan, Michigan, US. The track is located just north of town, surrounded the agricultural farming fields. It is home to one of the largest motocross tracks in the Midwest, is favorite to many pro riders, and is also known to have "The best dirt on earth." The track attracts 30,000+ attendees every Fourth of July weekend for the AMA Motocross Championship.

== History ==
The property Red Bud MX sits on was purchased in 1972 by Gene Ritchie and his wife Nancy with the Patterson and Miller families as partners. Gene, originally from Pennsylvania, had visited Buchanan on a snowmobiling trip. He saw the potential for a great motocross track in Buchanan, and within a few years he and his partners bought land on the west side of North Red Bud Trail, and began to build his track. They named the track Red Bud TNT (Track n Trail) after the name of the road the track sits on, the numerous Red Bud trees in the region, and because of Buchanan's city nickname, Red Bud City.

Red Bud first began holding races in 1973 and held its first AMA National race in 1974 which was won by Mike Hartwig.

The Red Bud track itself has been renovated and remodeled over the years but the infamous jump called LaRocco's Leap still remains. LaRocco's leap, constructed in 1991, is the longest jump in the MX circuit stretching 120 feet (37 m). Named after Laporte, Indiana, native Mike LaRocco who was the inspiration for the jump which was based on a jump at Larocco' personal track called "Kong." Larocco was the first man to clear it and did so on a 125cc bike.

The Traxxas TORC Series held off-road truck and buggy races at the track from 2011 to 2013. The 2012 two-day weekend was the second event of the season and it was televised on Discovery Network's Velocity channel.

There is an unofficial call and answer that has been adopted by Redbud fans and residents of southwestern Michigan. An individual will call, "ReeeedBuuuud!" and all the fans who hear will shout, "ReeeedBuuuud!" in return. The call has become a chorus that can be heard throughout the summer in the RedBud community.

The venue hosted the 72nd running of the Motocross of Nations on October 6–7, 2018. This was one of the biggest races the track hosted. 2022 Motocross des Nations Previous 2021 Next 2023 The 2022 Motocross des Nations was a motocross race held on 24 and 25 November 2022 in Buchanan, United States. This was the fifth time that the event was held in the United States and the second time at this track.

RedBud is currently run by two of Gene and Nancy's children, Amy Ritchie and Tim Ritchie. Gene Ritchie died on February 20, 2016, age 79.

== Amenities ==
Red Bud MX has three tracks: the professional motocross track and a KTM Kids track for younger riders. Along with a "Night track" used only on the Fourth of July national. The big weekend of the year is Nationals weekend, visitors are allowed to camp out on the property every 4 July weekend. There are spaces throughout the grounds for tents, campers, and RVs. During AMA Pro Motocross Nationals weekend, there are concession stands and food vendors from the local community selling food, water, and spirits. During regular race weekends there are also concessions and a few vendors as well.

== Champions ==
Red Bud AMA Motocross Results:

	450 Class	250 Class	WMX Class
2010	Ryan Dungey	Trey Canard	Jessica Patterson
2011	Chad Reed	Blake Baggett	Ashley Fiolek
2012	Ryan Dungey	Blake Baggett	Ashley Fiolek
2013	Ryan Villopoto	Ken Roczen	
2014	Ken Roczen	Jeremy Martin	
2015	Justin Barcia	Jeremy Martin	
2016	Ken Roczen	Cooper Webb	
2017	Eli Tomac	Zach Osborne	
2018	Marvin Musquin	Aaron Plessinger	
2019	Eli Tomac	Dylan Ferrandis	
2020	Zach Osborne	Jeremy Martin	
2020	Adam Cianciarulo	R.J. Hampshire	
2021	Dylan Ferrandis	R.J. Hampshire	
2022	Eli Tomac	Jo Shimoda	
2023	Jett Lawrence	Haiden Deegan	
2024	Chase Sexton	Chance Hymas	
2025	Jett Lawrence	Jo Shimoda	

== MXoN Motocross of Nations ==
Year	Riders	Country
2018	Gautier Paulin / Dylan Ferrandis / Jordi Tixier	France
2022	Eli Tomac / Justin Cooper / Chase Sexton	US
