= Monster Energy Cup (Supercross) =

Exhibition race

- Venue: Sam Boyd Stadium
- Location: Las Vegas
- Corporate sponsor: Monster Energy
- First race: 2011
- Last race: 2019
- Laps: 30 (Three 10-lap races)

The Monster Energy Cup is an exhibition race hosted by the AMA Supercross Championship that takes place in the Fall. The event started in 2011 and has been held at the Sam Boyd Stadium in Las Vegas every year since. A US $1 million purse is available to any rider who is able to win all three featured races.

== Format ==
The Monster Energy Cup consists of three 10-lap Main Events for riders of 450cc 4-stroke motorcycles; the same 22 riders compete in all three events. The event uses Olympic-style scoring, so the rider who gets the lowest overall score (a 1+1+1=3 being a perfect score for winning all three Main Events) is declared the winner. The overall winner pockets $100,000 if he fails to win all three Main Events.

Amateur and junior divisions also compete at the Monster Energy Cup.

== History ==
The Monster Energy Cup has been held at Sam Boyd Stadium each year since 2011. A $1 million purse for anyone who could win all three 450cc Main Events has been on the line each year, and has been won three times.

The first time came in the inaugural running of the event when Ryan Villopoto went 1-1-1 for the million. Justin Barcia won overall in 2012, then Ryan Dungey would have won in 2013 but forgot to take the mandatory "Joker Lane" during the first Main Event, costing him five positions and ultimately the overall win. Trey Canard came close to winning all three Main Events in 2014, but crashed out in the final main event handing the overall to Davi Millsaps. Ken Roczen won in 2015 and would have gone back-to-back in 2016 but crashed during the second Main Event, giving the overall to Eli Tomac. In 2017, Marvin Musquin became the second rider in the event's history to win all three Main Events. In 2018, sweepstakes winner Jesse Hebert was also in the running for US$1 million if one rider could win all three Main Events. Eli Tomac did, and so both Tomac and Hebert won $1 million. Adam Cianciarulo took home the crown in 2019, which was the last edition.

The Monster Energy Cup was scheduled in 2020 and was going to take place on October 10, 2020 but the event was canceled in mid 2020 because of the ongoing Covid 19 pandemic. The venune was going to be held at Dignity Health Sports Park which supercross had never competed at beforehand. The stadium however did host some X Games moto events in the late 2000s and 2010s.

== Monster Energy Cup Winners ==
Note: Winners listed in bold denote the million dollar winners.

Year	Rider	Finishes
2011	**Ryan Villopoto**	1-1-1
2012	Justin Barcia	2-1-2
2013	James Stewart Jr.	8-1-1
2014	Davi Millsaps	3-4-1
2015	Ken Roczen	1-4-1
2016	Eli Tomac	2-1-4
2017	**Marvin Musquin**	1-1-1
2018	**Eli Tomac**	1-1-1
2019	Adam Cianciarulo	2-2-1
