= Loretta Lynn's Amateur Championship =

Amateur motocross race held in Hurricane Mills, Tennessee

The Monster Energy AMA Amateur National Motocross Championship, formerly the Loretta Lynn's Amateur Championship, is held annually on Loretta Lynn's family ranch in Hurricane Mills, Tennessee. It is known as the world's largest amateur motocross race. It is the final stop for amateurs before they join the professional ranks.

Suggested in the early 1980s by race promoter Dave Coombs as a national amateur race held away from the contestants "Home Ground", the first race was held in 1982. Loretta and her husband embraced the idea and today it's the premier race of the amateur Motocross world. The track is constructed annually at their 6,000 acres horse ranch and has room for 300 camp sites. It is an ideal spot to hold a family oriented Motocross racing event.

Contestants must qualify through a series of events organized specifically for competing in one of the Amateur National Championship's 37 racing classes. Only the best 42 riders in each class get an invitation to compete. By design the six-day event is held the first week of August so that winners can try their hand at one of the 3 or 4 remaining events of the AMA outdoor Motocross season.

The list of winners reads like the who's who of American motocross talent since the mid 1990s. Ricky Carmichael went pro in 1996 weeks after winning his final Loretta's title. James Stewart Jr. won seven amateur titles from 1998-01. Mike Alessi was the 2004 star. Ryan Villopoto won at Loretta's and turned pro in 2005. Ryan Dungey (2006), Eli Tomac, Jason Anderson, Cooper Webb and Adam Cianciarulo were all Loretta's champions. Past Loretta Lynn's champions include Jeremy McGrath, Travis Pastrana and Kevin Windham. One rider every year based on results and potential is voted the winner of the Nicky Hayden Award in motocross for the rider with the most potential.

In 2020, because of the COVID-19 outbreak, the event was a support event to the ensuing weeks where Rounds 1 and 2 of the AMA Motocross Championship were held. Zach Osborne won both meetings in the 450cc class in a short-lived career where he won the AMA national championship that season (he retired in 2021 because of injuries), while Dylan Ferrandis and Jeremy Martin split the two 250cc meetings.
