= 2026 SuperMotocross World Championship =

Motorcycle racing competition

The 2026 SuperMotocross World Championship was the fourth edition of the premier combined discipline off-road motorcycle racing competition, that was held in the United States. Combining the AMA Supercross Championship and the AMA Motocross Championship, along with three final SuperMotocross rounds, the series ran from January to September.

Jett Lawrence went into the season as the reigning overall champion in the 450cc class, while Jo Shimoda began the campaign as the defending champion in the 250cc class.

With injuries impacting both reigning champions, four-time FIM Motocross World Champion Jorge Prado and Pro Circuit Kawasaki rider Levi Kitchen took the 450cc and 250cc titles respectively. Neither rider would win a supercross or motocross title as part of this, with both winning a single round of the outdoor season before the three SMX playoff rounds.

== 2026 AMA Supercross Championship ==
2026 AMA Supercross Championship
- Organizer: American Motorcyclist Association, Feld Entertainment (except Daytona), NASCAR Holdings, Inc. (Daytona)
- Discipline: Supercross
- Duration: January – May 2026
- Races: 17
- TV partners: NBC Sports (NBC & Peacock)

Seasons
- ← 2025 2027 →

The 2026 AMA Supercross Championship was the 53rd season of off-road stadium motorcycle racing in the United States. Comprising 17 rounds, the series ran from January until May, crowning supercross champions in both the 250cc and 450cc classes, concluding with the Salt Lake City round on May 9.

2026 Monster Energy AMA Supercross Championship
Round (250 East/West)	Date	Location	Stadium	Broadcast	450cc Winner	250cc Winner
1 (W)	January 10	(California) Anaheim	Angel Stadium	Peacock (live)	(United States) Eli Tomac	(United Kingdom) Max Anstie
2 (W)	January 17	(California) San Diego	Snapdragon Stadium	Peacock (live), NBC (delay)	(United States) Eli Tomac	(United States) Haiden Deegan
3 (W)	January 24	(California) Anaheim	Angel Stadium	Peacock (live)	(United States) Chase Sexton	(United States) Haiden Deegan
4 (W)	January 31	(Texas) Houston	NRG Stadium	Peacock (live)	(United States) Cooper Webb	(United States) Haiden Deegan
5 (W)	February 7	(Arizona) Glendale	State Farm Stadium	Peacock (live)	(Germany) Ken Roczen	(United States) Haiden Deegan
6 (W)	February 14	(Washington (state)) Seattle	Lumen Field	Peacock (live)	(United States) Eli Tomac	(United States) Haiden Deegan
7 (E)	February 21	(Texas) Arlington	AT&T Stadium	Peacock (live)	(Australia) Hunter Lawrence	(United States) Pierce Brown
8 (E)	February 28	(Florida) Daytona	Daytona International Speedway	Peacock (live)	(United States) Eli Tomac	(United States) Seth Hammaker
9 (E)	March 7	(Indiana) Indianapolis	Lucas Oil Stadium	Peacock (live)	(Australia) Hunter Lawrence	(New Zealand) Cole Davies
10 (E/W)	March 21	(Alabama) Birmingham	Protective Stadium	Peacock (live), NBC (delay)	(Australia) Hunter Lawrence	(New Zealand) Cole Davies
11 (E)	March 28	(Michigan) Detroit	Ford Field	Peacock (live)	(Germany) Ken Roczen	(New Zealand) Cole Davies
12 (E/W)	April 4	(Missouri) St. Louis	The Dome at America's Center	Peacock (live)	(Germany) Ken Roczen	(United States) Haiden Deegan
13 (E)	April 11	(Tennessee) Nashville	Nissan Stadium	Peacock,NBC (live)	(Australia) Hunter Lawrence	(New Zealand) Cole Davies
14 (E)	April 18	(Ohio) Cleveland	Huntington Bank Field	Peacock,NBC (live and delay)	(Germany) Ken Roczen	(United States) Nate Thrasher
15 (E)	April 25	(Pennsylvania) Philadelphia	Lincoln Financial Field	Peacock (live), NBC (delay)	(Germany) Ken Roczen	(New Zealand) Cole Davies
16 (W)	May 2	(Colorado) Denver	Empower Field at Mile High	Peacock (live), NBC (delay)	(Australia) Hunter Lawrence	(United States) Haiden Deegan
17 (E/W)	May 9	(Utah) Salt Lake City	Rice-Eccles Stadium	Peacock, NBC (delay)	(United States) Chase Sexton	(New Zealand) Cole Davies

=== Stadium locations ===
2026 AMA Supercross Championship locations

== 2026 AMA Motocross Championship ==
2026 AMA Motocross Championship
- Organizer: American Motorcyclist Association
- Discipline: Motocross
- Duration: May – August 2026
- Races: 11
- TV partners: NBC Sports (NBC & Peacock)

Seasons
- ← 2025 2027 →

The 2026 AMA Motocross Championship was the 55th season of the premier off-road motocross racing series in the United States. Comprising eleven rounds across three months from late May until August, the series crowned champions in both 250cc and 450cc classes.

2026 Lucas Oil Pro Motocross Championship
Round	Date	Event	Racetrack	Broadcast	250cc Winner	450cc Winner
1	May 31	(California) Fox Raceway National	Fox Raceway	Peacock (live), NBC (delay)	(United States) Seth Hammaker	(Australia) Hunter Lawrence
2	June 6	(California) Hangtown Classic	Hangtown	Peacock (live)	(United States) Levi Kitchen	(Australia) Jett Lawrence
3	June 13	(Colorado) Thunder Valley National	Thunder Valley	Peacock, NBC (live)	(Japan) Jo Shimoda	(Australia) Jett Lawrence
4	June 20	(Pennsylvania) High Point National	High Point	Peacock (live)	(New Zealand) Cole Davies	(Australia) Hunter Lawrence
5	July 4	(Michigan) Red Bud National	RedBud	Peacock (live)	(New Zealand) Cole Davies	(Australia) Hunter Lawrence
6	July 11	(Massachusetts) Southwick National	Southwick MX	Peacock (live)	(Belgium) Sacha Coenen	(Australia) Jett Lawrence
7	July 18	(Minnesota) Spring Creek National	Spring Creek	Peacock (live)	(United States) Julien Beaumer	(Australia) Hunter Lawrence
8	July 25	(Washington (state)) Washougal National	Washougal MX	Peacock (live)	(New Zealand) Cole Davies	(Australia) Hunter Lawrence
9	August 15	(New York (state)) Unadilla National	Unadilla	Peacock (live)	(New Zealand) Cole Davies	(Australia) Jett Lawrence
10	August 22	(Maryland) Budds Creek National	Budds Creek MX	Peacock, NBC (live)	(United States) Chance Hymas	(Australia) Hunter Lawrence
11	August 29	(Indiana) Ironman National	Ironman MX	Peacock (live)	(United States) Julien Beaumer	(Spain) Jorge Prado

=== Track locations ===
2026 AMA Motocross Championship locations

== 2026 SuperMotocross World Championship ==
2026 SuperMotocross World Championship
- Organizer: American Motorcyclist Association
- Discipline: Supercross and Motocross
- Duration: September 2026
- Races: 3
- TV partners: NBC Sports (NBC & Peacock)

Seasons
- ← 2025 2027 →

The 2026 SuperMotocross World Championship was the fourth season of the premier worldwide off-road motorcycle racing series, held in the United States. Combining the results of the 17 AMA Supercross Championship rounds and 11 AMA Motocross Championship events, the series comprised 31 rounds in total, with three dedicated SuperMotocross rounds that determined the overall champion of AMA off-road motorcycle racing for the season.

2026 SuperMotocross World Championship
Round	Date	Location	Stadium	Broadcast	250cc Winner	450cc Winner
1	September 12	Columbus, Ohio	Historic Crew Stadium	Peacock(Live), NBC (Delay)	(United States) Levi Kitchen	(United States) Haiden Deegan
2	September 19	Carson, California	Dignity Health Sports Park	Peacock (Live), NBC (One Hour Pre race only)	(United States) Julien Beaumer	(Spain) Jorge Prado
3	September 26	Ridgedale, Missouri	Thunder Ridge Nature Arena	Peacock (Live)	(New Zealand) Cole Davies	(United States) Haiden Deegan

=== Stadium locations ===
2026 AMA SuperMotocross Championship locations

=== 450SMX ===
The top 20 riders from the combined standings of the 2026 AMA Supercross Championship and the 2026 AMA National Motocross Championship automatically qualified and were seeded into each round of the SuperMotocross World Championship.

Riders from 21st-30th onwards in the combined standings competed in the Last Chance Qualifier in each event, with the top 2 from this competing in the main events with the seeded riders. The LCQ was also open to riders who won a supercross main event or motocross moto if they did not finish inside the top 30. If a seeded top 20 rider was unable to compete in an event, an additional opportunity to qualify was given to riders in the LCQ.

=== Entry list ===
Seeded Riders
Qualified Position	Team	Constructor	No	Rider	Rounds
4th	Honda HRC Progressive	Honda	1	(Australia) Jett Lawrence	
1st	Honda HRC Progressive	Honda	96	(Australia) Hunter Lawrence	All
3rd	Monster Energy Yamaha Star Racing	Yamaha	2	(United States) Cooper Webb	All
11th	Monster Energy Yamaha Star Racing	Yamaha	32	(United States) Justin Cooper	
7th	Monster Energy Yamaha Star Racing	Yamaha	38	(United States) Haiden Deegan	All
8th	Red Bull KTM Factory Racing	KTM	3	(United States) Eli Tomac	All
15th	Red Bull KTM Factory Racing	KTM	7	(United States) Aaron Plessinger	All
2nd	Red Bull KTM Factory Racing	KTM	26	(Spain) Jorge Prado	All
12th	Monster Energy Kawasaki	Kawasaki	4	(United States) Chase Sexton	
6th	Monster Energy Kawasaki	Kawasaki	36	(United States) Garrett Marchbanks	All
5th	Troy Lee Designs Red Bull Ducati Factory Racing	Ducati	14	(France) Dylan Ferrandis	All
13th	Troy Lee Designs Red Bull Ducati Factory Racing	Ducati	51	(United States) Justin Barcia	1–2
19th	Quadlock Honda Racing	Honda	17	(United States) Joey Savatgy	All
18th	Quadlock Honda Racing	Honda	28	(United States) Christian Craig	All
14th	5.11 Triumph Factory Racing Team	Triumph	20	(United States) Jordon Smith	All
16th	5.11 Triumph Factory Racing Team	Triumph	31	(Denmark) Mikkel Haarup	All
9th	Rockstar Energy Husqvarna	Husqvarna	24	(United States) RJ Hampshire	All
17th	Rockstar Energy Husqvarna	Husqvarna	27	(United States) Malcolm Stewart	All
20th	Team Tedder Racing	KTM	46	(United States) Justin Hill	All
10th	Progressive Insurance Cycle Gear Ecstar Suzuki	Suzuki	94	(Germany) Ken Roczen	All
LCQ Riders
Qualified Position	Team	Constructor	No	Rider	Rounds
22nd	Liqui Moly Beta Factory Racing	Beta	12	(United States) Shane McElrath	All
23rd	Liqui Moly Beta Factory Racing	Beta	54	(United States) Benny Bloss	All
32nd	Quadlock Honda	Honda	15	(United Kingdom) Dean Wilson	1
27th	Twisted Tea Suzuki presented by Progressive Insurance	Suzuki	21	(United States) Jason Anderson	1–2
24th	Twisted Tea Suzuki presented by Progressive Insurance	Suzuki	45	(United States) Colt Nichols	All
26th	Gizmo Racing Yamaha	Yamaha	39	(Switzerland) Valentin Guillod	All
30th	Gizmo Racing Yamaha	Yamaha	63	(Sweden) Fredrik Norén	All
21st	Partzilla Blaster PRMX Racing	Kawasaki	41	(United States) Mitchell Harrison	All
29th	Champion Tool Storage KMR KTM	KTM	62	(United States) Grant Harlan	All
38th	Champion Tool Storage KMR KTM	KTM	78	(United States) Kevin Moranz	3
42nd	Valley Motorsports	Honda	87	(United States) Jeremy Hand	1, 3
25th	ISRT Kawasaki	Kawasaki	417	(Norway) Cornelius Tøndel	All
28th	ISRT Kawasaki	Kawasaki	719	(United States) Vince Friese	All

=== Riders Championship ===
Pos	Rider	Bike	Points Reset	COL (Ohio)	CAR (California)	RID (Missouri)	Points
1	(Spain) Jorge Prado	KTM	22	3	1	2	158
2	(United States) Haiden Deegan	Yamaha	15	1	4	1	151
3	(Australia) Hunter Lawrence	Honda	25	15	2	3	136
4	(Germany) Ken Roczen	Suzuki	12	2	3	4	128
5	(United States) Cooper Webb	Yamaha	20	4	5	5	123
6	(United States) Garrett Marchbanks	Kawasaki	16	10	7	7	103
7	(United States) RJ Hampshire	Husqvarna	13	16	6	6	99
8	(United States) Jordon Smith	Triumph	8	9	10	8	87
9	(United States) Malcolm Stewart	Husqvarna	5	11	8	9	83
10	(United States) Aaron Plessinger	KTM	7	7	11	10	80
11	(United States) Eli Tomac	KTM	14	14	9	12	78
12	(France) Dylan Ferrandis	Ducati	17	6	12	15	74
13	(United States) Justin Hill	KTM	2	18	13	13	51
14	(United States) Shane McElrath	Beta		8	16	14	50
15	(United States) Christian Craig	Honda	4	17	14	16	43
16	(United States) Colt Nichols	Suzuki		22	18	11	41
17	(United States) Mitchell Harrison	Kawasaki		13	20	17	28
18	(Denmark) Mikkel Haarup	Triumph	6	21	21	18	21
19	(United States) Joey Savatgy	Honda	3	5	22	23	20
20	(United States) Vince Friese	Kawasaki		DNQ	17	19	19
21	(Australia) Jett Lawrence	Honda	18				18
22	(United States) Benny Bloss	Beta		DNQ	15	DNQ	14
23	(United States) Justin Barcia	Ducati	9	19	24		12
24	(United States) Justin Cooper	Yamaha	11				11
25	(United States) Jason Anderson	Suzuki		12	DNQ		10
26	(United States) Chase Sexton	Kawasaki	10				10
27	(Sweden) Fredrik Norén	Yamaha		DNQ	19	21	9
28	(United States) Grant Harlan	KTM		DNQ	23	20	6
29	(Norway) Cornelius Tøndel	Kawasaki		20	DNQ	DNQ	2
	(United States) Jeremy Hand	Honda		DNQ		22	0
	(Switzerland) Valentin Guillod	Yamaha		DNQ	DNQ	DNQ	0
	(United Kingdom) Dean Wilson	Honda		DNQ			0
	(United States) Kevin Moranz	KTM				DNQ	0
Pos	Rider	Bike	Points Reset	COL (Ohio)	CAR (California)	RID (Missouri)	Points

=== 250SMX ===
The top 20 riders from the combined standings of the 2026 AMA Supercross Championship and the 2026 AMA National Motocross Championship automatically qualified and were seeded into each round of the SuperMotocross World Championship.

Riders from 21st-30th onwards in the combined standings competed in the Last Chance Qualifier in each event, with the top 2 from this competing in the main events with the seeded riders. The LCQ was also open to riders who won a supercross main event or motocross moto if they did not finish inside the top 30. If a seeded top 20 rider was unable to compete in an event, an additional opportunity to qualify was given to riders in the LCQ.

=== Entry list ===
Seeded Riders
Qualified Position	Team	Constructor	No	Rider	Rounds
11th	Honda HRC Progressive	Honda	1	(Japan) Jo Shimoda	All
4th	Honda HRC Progressive	Honda	29	(United States) Chance Hymas	All
8th	Monster Energy Pro Circuit Kawasaki	Kawasaki	10	(United States) Seth Hammaker	
17th	Monster Energy Pro Circuit Kawasaki	Kawasaki	35	(United States) Drew Adams	All
2nd	Monster Energy Pro Circuit Kawasaki	Kawasaki	47	(United States) Levi Kitchen	All
5th	Red Bull KTM Factory Racing	KTM	13	(United States) Julien Beaumer	All
18th	ClubMX Yamaha	Yamaha	19	(United States) Max Vohland	All
19th	ClubMX Yamaha	Yamaha	60	(United States) Hunter Yoder	1–2
12th	Monster Energy Yamaha Star Racing	Yamaha	23	(United States) Michael Mosiman	1
7th	Monster Energy Yamaha Star Racing	Yamaha	25	(United States) Nate Thrasher	All
1st	Monster Energy Yamaha Star Racing	Yamaha	37	(New Zealand) Cole Davies	All
13th	Monster Energy Yamaha Star Racing	Yamaha	38	(United States) Haiden Deegan	
15th	Monster Energy Yamaha Star Racing	Yamaha	82	(United States) Caden Dudney	All
6th	Monster Energy Yamaha Star Racing	Yamaha	99	(Australia) Kayden Minear	All
20th	Monster Energy Yamaha Star Racing	Yamaha	180	(United States) Landen Gordon	All
3rd	Rockstar Energy Husqvarna	Husqvarna	34	(United States) Ryder DiFrancesco	All
10th	Rockstar Energy Husqvarna	Husqvarna	58	(United States) Daxton Bennick	All
16th	Toyota Redlands BarX Yamaha	Yamaha	42	(United States) Dilan Schwartz	All
14th	Toyota Redlands BarX Yamaha	Yamaha	43	(United States) Lux Turner	All
9th	AEO Powersports KTM Racing	KTM	71	(United States) Carson Mumford	
LCQ Riders
Qualified Position	Team	Constructor	No	Rider	Rounds
24th	ClubMX Yamaha	Yamaha	22	(United States) Coty Schock	
22nd	ClubMX Yamaha	Yamaha	61	(United Kingdom) Max Anstie	All
30th	ClubMX Yamaha	Yamaha	89	(United States) Devin Simonson	All
28th	Toyota Redlands BarX Yamaha	Yamaha	40	(United States) Parker Ross	1–2
27th	MX6 Racing	Kawasaki	53	(United States) Henry Miller	All
29th	MX6 Racing	Kawasaki	65	(United States) Marshal Weltin	All
25th	AEO Powersports KTM Racing	KTM	57	(United States) Avery Long	1–2
23rd	Rockstar Energy Husqvarna	Husqvarna	59	(United States) Casey Cochran	
21st	Monster Energy Pro Circuit Kawasaki	Kawasaki	141	(United States) Nick Romano	All
32nd	Monster Energy Pro Circuit Kawasaki	Kawasaki	142	(United States) Cameron McAdoo	All
26th	Monster Energy Yamaha Star Racing	Yamaha	163	(United States) Pierce Brown	All
34th	Grindstone Friesen Group Kawasaki	Kawasaki	224	(United States) Joshua Varize	2

=== Riders Championship ===
Pos	Rider	Bike	Points Reset	COL (Ohio)	CAR (California)	RID (Missouri)	Points
1	(United States) Levi Kitchen	Kawasaki	22	1	3	2	153
2	(United States) Ryder DiFrancesco	Husqvarna	20	3	2	7	129
3	(New Zealand) Cole Davies	Yamaha	25	10	14	1	128
4	(United States) Julien Beaumer	KTM	17	18	1	6	119
5	(United States) Landen Gordon	Yamaha	2	8	8	3	104
6	(United States) Nate Thrasher	Yamaha	15	12	12	4	99
7	(United States) Daxton Bennick	Husqvarna	12	2	11	8	98
8	(United States) Pierce Brown	Yamaha		16	6	5	89
9	(Japan) Jo Shimoda	Honda	11	13	4	12	86
10	(Australia) Kayden Minear	Yamaha	16	15	5	13	84
11	(United States) Cameron McAdoo	Kawasaki		5	10	9	80
12	(United States) Caden Dudney	Yamaha	7	6	15	10	73
13	(United States) Dilan Schwartz	Yamaha	6	20	9	11	67
14	(United States) Drew Adams	Kawasaki	5	9	7	16	66
15	(United States) Chance Hymas	Honda	18	7	13	DNS	51
16	(United States) Lux Turner	Yamaha	8	11	18	14	51
17	(United States) Max Vohland	Yamaha	4	4	21	15	24
18	(United States) Nick Romano	Kawasaki		21	16	19	22
19	(United Kingdom) Max Anstie	Yamaha		DNQ	17	18	22
20	(United States) Marshal Weltin	Kawasaki		14	19	21	17
21	(United States) Devin Simonson	Yamaha		DNQ	DNQ	17	15
22	(United States) Seth Hammaker	Kawasaki	14				14
23	(United States) Carson Mumford	KTM	13				13
24	(United States) Henry Miller	Kawasaki		17	DNQ	20	11
25	(United States) Michael Mosiman	Yamaha	10	DNS			10
26	(United States) Haiden Deegan	Yamaha	9				9
27	(United States) Hunter Yoder	Yamaha	3	19	23		6
28	(United States) Joshua Varize	Kawasaki			20		4
	(United States) Avery Long	KTM		DNQ	22		0
	(United States) Parker Ross	Yamaha		22	DNQ		0
Pos	Rider	Bike	Points Reset	COL (Ohio)	CAR (California)	RID (Missouri)	Points
