= 2021 AMA Supercross Championship =

48th professional Supercross racing in USA

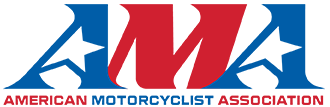
- Organizer: American Motorcyclist Association, Feld Entertainment (except Daytona), NASCAR Holdings, Inc. (Daytona)
- Discipline: Supercross
- Duration: January – May 2021
- Number of races: 17
- TV partners: NBC Sports (NBC, NBCSN)

Champions
- 450cc: (United States) Cooper Webb
- 250cc West: (United States) Colt Nichols
- 250cc West: (United States) Justin Cooper

AMA Supercross
- ← 2020 2022 →

The 2021 AMA Supercross Championship was the 48th season of professional Supercross racing in the United States. The series is sanctioned by the FIM as the world championship of the sport.

== Defending champions ==
The following riders are defending champions having won their respective classes in 2020:

- 450 SX – Eli Tomac (Kawasaki)
- 250 SX West – N/A (Dylan Ferrandis has moved up to the 450 SX class with Yamaha)
- 250 SX East – N/A (Chase Sexton has moved up to the 450 SX class with Honda)

== Schedule and results ==
The 2021 schedule includes 17 races at seven venues, with all NFL stadia and Hampton using three races (two Saturday and one Tuesday). The two college football stadiums will run on two consecutive Saturdays, while Daytona, which is promoted by NASCAR Holdings and not Feld Entertainment, is the only single event meeting. One new venue, Hampton, held at Atlanta Motor Speedway, previously hosted the Lucas Oil Motocross, also referred as the "outdoor" season, from 1978 to 1980.

Race Winners (Note: A (W) next to the event indicates it is part of the 250 SX West Championship, while an (E) indicates it is part of the 250 SX East Championship. (E/W) indicates a 250 SX East/250 SX West combination event.)
Round	Date	Location	Stadium	450SX Winner	250SX Winner
1 (E)	16 January	(Texas) Houston	NRG Stadium	(United States) Justin Barcia	(United States) Christian Craig
2 (E)	19 January	(Texas) Houston	NRG Stadium	(United States) Eli Tomac	(Australia) Jett Lawrence
3 (E)	23 January	(Texas) Houston	NRG Stadium	(United States) Cooper Webb	(United States) Colt Nichols
4 (E)	30 January	(Indiana) Indianapolis	Lucas Oil Stadium	(Germany) Ken Roczen	(United States) Colt Nichols
5 (E)	2 February	(Indiana) Indianapolis	Lucas Oil Stadium	(Germany) Ken Roczen	(United States) Colt Nichols
6 (E)	6 February	(Indiana) Indianapolis	Lucas Oil Stadium	(Germany) Ken Roczen	(United States) Christian Craig
7 (E)	13 February	(Florida) Orlando	Camping World Stadium	(United States) Cooper Webb	(Australia) Jett Lawrence
8 (W)	20 February	(Florida) Orlando	Camping World Stadium	(United States) Cooper Webb	(United States) Justin Cooper
9 (W)	6 March	(Florida) Daytona Beach	Daytona International Speedway	(United States) Eli Tomac	(United States) Cameron McAdoo
10 (W)	13 March	(Texas) Arlington	AT&T Stadium	(United States) Cooper Webb	(United States) Seth Hammaker
11 (W)	16 March	(Texas) Arlington	AT&T Stadium	(United States) Cooper Webb	(Australia) Hunter Lawrence
12 (W)	20 March	(Texas) Arlington	AT&T Stadium	(United States) Cooper Webb	(United States) Justin Cooper
13 (W)	10 April	(Georgia (U.S. state)) Hampton	Atlanta Motor Speedway	(United States) Eli Tomac	(United States) Nate Thrasher
14 (W)	13 April	(Georgia (U.S. state)) Hampton	Atlanta Motor Speedway	(Germany) Ken Roczen	(United States) Justin Cooper
15 (W)	17 April	(Georgia (U.S. state)) Hampton	Atlanta Motor Speedway	(United States) Cooper Webb	(United States) Nate Thrasher
16 (E)	24 April	(Utah) Salt Lake City	Rice-Eccles Stadium	(France) Marvin Musquin	(Japan) Jo Shimoda
17 (E/W)	1 May	(Utah) Salt Lake City	Rice-Eccles Stadium	(United States) Cooper Webb	(Australia) Jett Lawrence

== 450 SX ==
=== Entry list ===
Team	Constructor	No	Rider	Rounds
Monster Energy Kawasaki Team	Kawasaki	1	(United States) Eli Tomac	All
Monster Energy Kawasaki Team	Kawasaki	9	(United States) Adam Cianciarulo	1–8
Red Bull KTM Factory Racing Team	KTM	2	(United States) Cooper Webb	All
Red Bull KTM Factory Racing Team	KTM	25	(France) Marvin Musquin	All
Monster Energy Star Yamaha Racing	Yamaha	7	(United States) Aaron Plessinger	All
Monster Energy Star Yamaha Racing	Yamaha	14	(France) Dylan Ferrandis	All
Monster Energy Star Yamaha Racing	Yamaha	27	(United States) Malcolm Stewart	All
Muc-Off Honda	Honda	10	(United States) Justin Brayton	1–7, 10–11
Muc-Off Honda	Honda	49	(United States) Mitchell Oldenburg	8–9, 12–14
Team Chiz	Yamaha	11	(United States) Kyle Chisholm	1–14, 17
SmarTop/Bullfrog Spas/MotoConcepts Honda	Honda	12	(United States) Shane McElrath	7–9
SmarTop/Bullfrog Spas/MotoConcepts Honda	Honda	20	(United States) Broc Tickle	All
SmarTop/Bullfrog Spas/MotoConcepts Honda	Honda	37	(United States) Benny Bloss	1–11, 13–17
SmarTop/Bullfrog Spas/MotoConcepts Honda	Honda	40	(United States) Vince Friese	1–13
Rockstar Energy Husqvarna Factory Racing Team	Husqvarna	15	(United Kingdom) Dean Wilson	1–4, 7–17
Rockstar Energy Husqvarna Factory Racing Team	Husqvarna	16	(United States) Zach Osborne	1–8
Rockstar Energy Husqvarna Factory Racing Team	Husqvarna	21	(United States) Jason Anderson	All
Rocky Mountain ATV/MC KTM	KTM	17	(United States) Joey Savatgy	All
Rocky Mountain ATV/MC KTM	KTM	19	(United States) Justin Bogle	1–11, 13
Team Honda HRC	Honda	23	(United States) Chase Sexton	1–2, 9–17
Team Honda HRC	Honda	94	(Germany) Ken Roczen	All
Twisted Tea HEP Suzuki	Suzuki	28	(United States) Brandon Hartranft	1–12, 15–17
Twisted Tea HEP Suzuki	Suzuki	34	(United Kingdom) Max Anstie	8–17
Twisted Tea HEP Suzuki	Suzuki	722	(United States) Adam Enticknap	1–8, 13–17
Team Tedder KTM Racing	KTM	36	(Ecuador) Martin Davalos	1–15
Team Tedder KTM Racing	KTM		(United States) Dakota Tedder	
Ikthus Brittenum Kawasaki	Kawasaki	43	(Sweden) Fredrik Noren	1–11, 13–14, 16–17
System 3 Offroad	Kawasaki	44	(United States) Tyler Bowers	7–17
Troy Lee Designs Red Bull Gas Gas	Gas Gas	51	(United States) Justin Barcia	All
SGB Racing Babbitt's Online	Kawasaki	57	(United States) Justin Rodbell	1–7, 13–15, 17
SGB Racing Babbitt's Online	Kawasaki	83	(United States) Alex Ray	1–6, 8, 10–17
SGB Racing Babbitt's Online	Kawasaki	309	(United States) Jeremy Smith	All
SGB Racing Babbitt's Online	Kawasaki	330	(United States) AJ Catanzaro	All
Team Solitaire Nuclear Blast Yamaha	Yamaha	69	(United States) Robbie Wageman	16
Auto Owners Insurance	KTM	70	(United States) Henry Miller	9–17
TiLube Storm Lake Honda	Honda	76	(United States) Grant Harlan	9
JSR Motorsports	KTM	81	(United States) Justin Starling	All
Mountain Motorsports	Yamaha	84	(United States) Josh Hill	13–15
Team TPJ Fly Racing	KTM	85	(United States) Kevin Moranz	8–13
All South Munn Racing	Husqvarna	87	(United States) Curren Thurman	9–15
MADD Parts DEMX	Kawasaki	88	(United States) Logan Karnow	8–15
MADD Parts DEMX	Kawasaki	282	(United States) Theodore Pauli	All
MADD Parts DEMX	Kawasaki	848	(Spain) Joan Cros	All
Race Driven KTM	KTM	99	(United States) Hunter Sayles	8–9
	Yamaha	100	(South Africa) Dirco Van der Westhuizen	13–15
Team All South	Husqvarna	114	(United States) Nick Schmidt	All
Team All South	Husqvarna	421	(United States) Vann Martin	All
Team All South	Husqvarna	976	(United States) Joshua Greco	All
Team BWR Engines	Honda	118	(United States) Cheyenne Harmon	16–17
Team BWR Engines	Honda	185	(United States) Wilson Fleming	13–15
Team BWR Engines	Honda	805	(United States) Carlen Gardner	1–10
Team Faith	Kawasaki	120	(United States) Todd Bannister	17
Westside Motorsports	Kawasaki	121	(United States) Chris Howell	1–3, 7, 16–17
Ronnie Prado Company	KTM	124	(United States) Lane Shaw	10–12
Ronnie Prado Company	Kawasaki	501	(United States) Scotty Wennerstrom	All
Team PR-MX	Kawasaki	125	(United States) Luke Neese	13–15
Team PR-MX	Kawasaki	280	(United States) Cade Clason	All
Team PR-MX	Kawasaki	519	(United States) Joshua Cartwright	10–17
Team PR-MX	Kawasaki	951	(United States) Ryan Surratt	16
Team PR-MX	Kawasaki	952	(France) Ludovic Macler	1–8
DMP Motorsports	Honda	138	(United States) David Pulley	17
	Suzuki	141	(United States) Richard Taylor	8, 10–12
Partzilla.com Yamaha	Yamaha	184	(United States) Scott Champion	1–3, 10–15
	Yamaha	193	(United States) Hunter Schlosser	8, 10–12
	KTM	204	(United States) Kyle Greeson	17
Motorsport Hillsboro	KTM	216	(United States) Devin Harriman	8–11
Rides Unlimited	KTM	364	(United States) Chad Saultz	8–9
JMC Motorsports	Husqvarna	441	(United States) Scott Meshey	9, 13–14
RJC Racing	Kawasaki	447	(United States) Deven Raper	All
	KTM	509	(United States) Alexander Nagy	1, 8–9, 17
	Yamaha	512	(United States) Austin Cozadd	9–15
Advanced Electric Inc.	Kawasaki	597	(United States) Mason Kerr	1–2, 8–11, 13–15, 17
	Husqvarna	606	(United States) Ronnie Stewart	1–3, 7–15
	KTM	625	(United States) Jonah Geistler	8–9
Alien Lab CBD	Kawasaki	637	(United States) Bobby Piazza	1–2, 8–15
Leininger International	Honda	795	(United States) Aaron Leininger	1–3, 5–10
ShredCo Stahlman Powersports	Kawasaki	824	(United States) Carter Stephenson	1–6
	Yamaha	916	(United States) Justin Rando	7–9
HRT Racing	Honda	981	(United States) Austin Politelli	1–5, 7–9
Yankton Motorsports	Kawasaki	996	(United States) Preston Taylor	6, 10–11

=== Championship Standings ===
Pos	Rider	Bike	HO1 (Texas)	HO2 (Texas)	HO3 (Texas)	IN1 (Indiana)	IN2 (Indiana)	IN3 (Indiana)	OR1 (Florida)	OR2 (Florida)	DAY (Florida)	AR1 (Texas)	AR2 (Texas)	AR3 (Texas)	HA1 (Georgia (U.S. state))	HA2 (Georgia (U.S. state))	HA3 (Georgia (U.S. state))	SL1 (Utah)	SL2 (Utah)	Points
1	(United States) Cooper Webb	KTM	9	4	1	3	4	2	1	1	2	1	1	1	3	6	1	2	1	388
2	(Germany) Ken Roczen	Honda	2	5	2	1	1	1	2	4	4	6	3	2	9	1	2	6	10	353
3	(United States) Eli Tomac	Kawasaki	13	1	5	2	3	7	5	6	1	8	2	3	1	5	3	10	9	326
4	(United States) Justin Barcia	Gas Gas	1	9	4	13	2	19	4	3	6	2	4	4	10	4	5	14	7	289
5	(United States) Aaron Plessinger	Yamaha	8	16	7	9	5	11	6	9	3	5	6	9	6	8	4	8	8	264
6	(United States) Malcolm Stewart	Yamaha	5	7	6	11	10	4	9	7	5	14	13	6	11	22	6	3	5	248
7	(France) Dylan Ferrandis	Yamaha	7	2	12	6	9	8	22	11	11	22	8	7	5	11	7	4	4	237
8	(United States) Jason Anderson	Husqvarna	15	8	8	7	DNQ	6	8	5	7	3	7	5	4	3	14	7	22	237
9	(France) Marvin Musquin	KTM	3	6	13	10	11	3	7	2	21	DNQ		22	7	7	9	1	2	231
10	(United States) Joey Savatgy	KTM	11	21	14	8	8	9	13	16	12	7	11	8	8	10	11	11	6	207
11	(United Kingdom) Dean Wilson	Husqvarna	12	11	11	DNQ			12	12	10	9	10	10	DNQ	9	8	9	11	165
12	(United States) Chase Sexton	Honda	14	22							8	4	5	21	2	2	10	5	3	162
13	(United States) Broc Tickle	Honda	17	13	17	14	12	13	DNQ	13	22	DNQ	17	11	14	13	13	12	16	128
14	(Ecuador) Martin Davalos	KTM	18	20	16	15	14	15	16	17	16	10	9	16	12	12	12			124
15	(United States) Zach Osborne	Husqvarna	10	10	9	5	7	10	3	8										123
16	(United States) Adam Cianciarulo	Kawasaki	4	12	3	4	6	5	10	21										120
17	(United States) Justin Brayton	Honda	6	3	10	12	22	12	11			13	DNQ							96
18	(United States) Vince Friese	Honda	16	15	19	17	19	14	15	15	13	11	14	12	21					94
19	(United States) Kyle Chisholm	Yamaha	19	14	18	20	15	17	19	20	17	15	15	15	15	DNQ			15	88
20	(United States) Justin Bogle	KTM	DNQ	DNQ	20	16	16	16	18	10	9	12	12		DNQ					78
21	(United Kingdom) Max Anstie	Suzuki								18	14	16	16	13	22	14	16	13	12	76
22	(United States) Benny Bloss	Honda	DNQ	19	15	19	13	22	14	19	18	20	DNQ		DNQ	DNQ	22	16	13	66
23	(United States) Tyler Bowers	Kawasaki							DNQ	22	DNQ	DNQ	19	20	16	15	15	15	14	48
24	(United States) Cade Clason	Kawasaki	DNQ	DNQ	DNQ	DNQ	21	21	DNQ	DNQ	20	19	18	DNQ	17	17	20	17	19	41
25	(United States) Brandon Hartranft	Suzuki	21	17	DNQ	18	17	DNQ	DNQ	DNQ	19	DNQ	DNQ	18			19	18	DNQ	37
26	(United States) Alex Ray	Kawasaki	22	18	DNQ	DNQ	20	DNQ		DNQ	DNQ	17	DNQ	19	20	DNQ	18	DNQ	18	32
27	(United States) Mitchell Oldenburg	Honda								DNQ	15			14	13	21				29
28	(United States) Justin Starling	KTM	DNQ	DNQ	DNQ	DNQ	DNQ	DNQ	20	DNQ	DNQ	DNQ	20	17	DNQ	18	DNQ	19	17	27
29	(United States) Shane McElrath	Honda							17	14	DNQ									15
30	(United States) Josh Hill	Yamaha													DNQ	16	17			13
31	(United States) Carlen Gardner	Honda	DNQ	DNQ	21	DNQ	18	18	DNQ	DNQ	DNQ	DNQ								12
32	(Sweden) Fredrik Noren	Kawasaki	DNQ	DNQ	DNQ	DNQ	DNQ	DNQ	21	DNQ	DNQ	DNQ	DNQ		18	DNQ		21	20	12
33	(United States) Kevin Moranz	KTM								DNQ	DNQ	18	21	DNQ	19					11
34	(United States) Adam Enticknap	Suzuki	20	DNQ	DNQ	22	DNQ	20	DNQ	DNQ					DNQ	DNQ	21	DNQ	DNQ	9
35	(United States) Henry Miller	KTM									DNQ	DNQ	DNQ	DNQ	DNQ	19	DNQ	20	DNQ	7
36	(United States) Scott Champion	Yamaha	DNQ	DNQ	DNQ							21	DNQ	DNQ	DNQ	20	DNQ			5
37	(United States) Austin Politelli	Honda	DNQ	DNQ	22	21	DNQ		DNQ	DNQ	DNQ									3
38	(Spain) Joan Cros	Kawasaki	DNQ	DNQ	DNQ	DNQ	DNQ	DNQ	DNQ	DNQ	DNQ	DNQ	22	DNQ	DNQ	DNQ	DNQ	DNQ	21	3
39	(United States) Joshua Cartwright	Kawasaki										DNQ	DNQ	DNQ	DNQ	DNQ	DNQ	22	DNQ	1
	(United States) Theodore Pauli	Kawasaki	DNQ	DNQ	DNQ	DNQ	DNQ	DNQ	DNQ	DNQ	DNQ	DNQ	DNQ	DNQ	DNQ	DNQ	DNQ	DNQ	DNQ	0
	(United States) Jeremy Smith	Kawasaki	DNQ	DNQ	DNQ	DNQ	DNQ	DNQ	DNQ	DNQ	DNQ	DNQ	DNQ	DNQ	DNQ	DNQ	DNQ	DNQ	DNQ	0
	(United States) Nick Schmidt	Husqvarna	DNQ	DNQ	DNQ	DNQ	DNQ	DNQ	DNQ	DNQ	DNQ	DNQ	DNQ	DNQ	DNQ	DNQ	DNQ	DNQ	DNQ	0
	(United States) AJ Catanzaro	Kawasaki	DNQ	DNQ	DNQ	DNQ	DNQ	DNQ	DNQ	DNQ	DNQ	DNQ	DNQ	DNQ	DNQ	DNQ	DNQ	DNQ	DNQ	0
	(United States) Vann Martin	Husqvarna	DNQ	DNQ	DNQ	DNQ	DNQ	DNQ	DNQ	DNQ	DNQ	DNQ	DNQ	DNQ	DNQ	DNQ	DNQ	DNQ	DNQ	0
	(United States) Joshua Greco	Husqvarna	DNQ	DNQ	DNQ	DNQ	DNQ	DNQ	DNQ	DNQ	DNQ	DNQ	DNQ	DNQ	DNQ	DNQ	DNQ	DNQ	DNQ	0
	(United States) Deven Raper	Kawasaki	DNQ	DNQ	DNQ	DNQ	DNQ	DNQ	DNQ	DNQ	DNQ	DNQ	DNQ	DNQ	DNQ	DNQ	DNQ	DNQ	DNQ	0
	(United States) Scotty Wennerstrom	Kawasaki	DNQ	DNQ	DNQ	DNQ	DNQ	DNQ	DNQ	DNQ	DNQ	DNQ	DNQ	DNQ	DNQ	DNQ	DNQ	DNQ	DNQ	0
	(United States) Ronnie Stewart	Gas Gas	DNQ	DNQ	DNQ				DNQ	DNQ	DNQ	DNQ	DNQ	DNQ	DNQ	DNQ	DNQ			0
	(United States) Justin Rodbell	Kawasaki	DNQ	DNQ	DNQ	DNQ	DNQ	DNQ	DNQ						DNQ	DNQ	DNQ		DNQ	0
	(United States) Bobby Piazza	Kawasaki	DNQ	DNQ						DNQ	DNQ	DNQ	DNQ	DNQ	DNQ	DNQ	DNQ			0
	(United States) Mason Kerr	Kawasaki	DNQ	DNQ						DNQ	DNQ	DNQ	DNQ		DNQ	DNQ	DNQ		DNQ	0
	(United States) Aaron Leininger	Honda	DNQ	DNQ	DNQ		DNQ	DNQ	DNQ	DNQ	DNQ	DNQ								0
	(France) Ludovic Macler	Kawasaki	DNQ	DNQ	DNQ	DNQ	DNQ	DNQ	DNQ	DNQ										0
	(United States) Logan Karnow	Kawasaki								DNQ	DNQ	DNQ	DNQ	DNQ	DNQ	DNQ	DNQ			0
	(United States) Curren Thurman	Husqvarna									DNQ	DNQ	DNQ	DNQ	DNQ	DNQ	DNQ			0
	(United States) Austin Cozadd	Yamaha									DNQ	DNQ	DNQ	DNQ	DNQ	DNQ	DNQ			0
	(United States) Carter Stephenson	Kawasaki	DNQ	DNQ	DNQ	DNQ	DNQ	DNQ												0
	(United States) Chris Howell	Kawasaki	DNQ	DNQ	DNQ				DNQ									DNQ	DNQ	0
	(United States) Devin Harriman	KTM								DNQ	DNQ	DNQ	DNQ							0
	(United States) Hunter Schlosser	Yamaha								DNQ		DNQ	DNQ	DNQ						0
	(United States) Richard Taylor	Suzuki								DNQ		DNQ	DNQ	DNQ						0
	(United States) Alexander Nagy	KTM	DNQ							DNQ	DNQ								DNQ	0
	(United States) Preston Taylor	Kawasaki						DNQ				DNQ	DNQ							0
	(United States) Justin Rando	Yamaha							DNQ	DNQ	DNQ									0
	(United States) Scott Meshey	Husqvarna									DNQ				DNQ	DNQ				0
	(United States) Lane Shaw	KTM										DNQ	DNQ	DNQ						0
	(United States) Luke Neese	Kawasaki													DNQ	DNQ	DNQ			0
	(United States) Wilson Fleming	Honda													DNQ	DNQ	DNQ			0
	(South Africa) Dirco Van der Westhuizen	Yamaha													DNQ	DNQ	DNQ			0
	(United States) Hunter Sayles	KTM								DNQ	DNQ									0
	(United States) Chad Saultz	KTM								DNQ	DNQ									0
	(United States) Jonah Geistler	KTM								DNQ	DNQ									0
	(United States) Cheyenne Harmon	Honda																DNQ	DNQ	0
	(United States) Grant Harlan	Honda									DNQ									0
	(United States) Robbie Wageman	Yamaha																DNQ		0
	(United States) Ryan Surratt	Kawasaki																DNQ		0
	(United States) Kyle Greeson	KTM																	DNQ	0
	(United States) Todd Bannister	Kawasaki																	DNQ	0
	(United States) David Pulley	Honda																	DNQ	0
Pos	Rider	Bike	HO1 (Texas)	HO2 (Texas)	HO3 (Texas)	IN1 (Indiana)	IN2 (Indiana)	IN3 (Indiana)	OR1 (Florida)	OR2 (Florida)	DAY (Florida)	AR1 (Texas)	AR2 (Texas)	AR3 (Texas)	HA1 (Georgia (U.S. state))	HA2 (Georgia (U.S. state))	HA3 (Georgia (U.S. state))	SL1 (Utah)	SL2 (Utah)	Points

== 250 SX East ==
=== Entry list ===
Team	Constructor	No	Rider	Rounds
Team Honda HRC	Honda	18	(Australia) Jett Lawrence	1–7, 16–17
Rockstar Energy Husqvarna Factory Racing Team	Husqvarna	24	(United States) RJ Hampshire	1–3
Monster Energy Star Yamaha Racing	Yamaha	29	(United States) Christian Craig	1–7, 16
Monster Energy Star Yamaha Racing	Yamaha	64	(United States) Colt Nichols	1–7, 16–17
Monster Energy Pro Circuit Kawasaki	Kawasaki	30	(Japan) Jo Shimoda	1–7, 16–17
Monster Energy Pro Circuit Kawasaki	Kawasaki	38	(United States) Austin Forkner	1–3
Troy Lee Designs Red Bull Gas Gas	Gas Gas	42	(United States) Michael Mosiman	1–6, 16–17
Muc-Off Honda	Honda	49	(United States) Mitchell Oldenburg	1–7
Phoenix Racing Honda	Honda	50	(Brazil) Enzo Lopes	1
Phoenix Racing Honda	Honda	95	(United States) Joshua Osby	1–7, 16–17
BARX Chaparral Ecstar Suzuki	Suzuki	55	(United States) John Short	1–6, 16–17
SGB Racing Babbitt's Online	Kawasaki	57	(United States) Justin Rodbell	16
TiLube Storm Lake Honda	Honda	76	(United States) Grant Harlan	1–7
TiLube Storm Lake Honda	Honda	162	(United States) Maxwell Sanford	1–2, 4–7, 16–17
Team TPJ Fly Racing	KTM	85	(United States) Kevin Moranz	1–7
All South Munn Racing	Husqvarna	87	(United States) Curren Thurman	1–7, 16
MADD Parts DEMX	Kawasaki	88	(United States) Logan Karnow	1–7, 16–17
Race Driven KTM	KTM	99	(United States) Hunter Sayles	1–7
Red Bull KTM Factory Racing	KTM	115	(United States) Max Vohland	1–4
	Kawasaki	116	(United States) TJ Albright	1–4
World of Wheels	Honda	122	(United States) Jeremy Hand	1–7
Ronnie Prado Company	KTM	124	(United States) Lane Shaw	1–7, 16–17
Team PR-MX	Honda	125	(United States) Luke Neese	1–7, 16–17
Team PR-MX	Kawasaki	170	(United States) Devin Simonson	1–7, 16–17
KTM Canada Red Bull THOR Racing Team	KTM	134	(Canada) Jess Pettis	1
Travco Motorsports	Honda	151	(United States) Carter Gordon	1–4
	Husqvarna	160	(United States) Vincent Murphy	1–3, 6–7
Edge Performance Sports	KTM	181	(United States) Wyatt Lyonsmith	1
Team BWR Engines	Honda	185	(United States) Wilson Fleming	1–7, 16–17
	Yamaha	193	(United States) Hunter Schlosser	1–7, 16–17
Motorsport Hillsboro	KTM	216	(United States) Devin Harriman	1–7
KTM Orange Brigade	KTM	241	(United States) Joshua Varize	1–7, 16–17
KTM Orange Brigade	KTM	604	(United States) Max Miller	1–5
	Kawasaki	260	(United Kingdom) Dylan Woodcock	1–3
Rides Unlimited	KTM	364	(United States) Chad Saultz	1–7
	Kawasaki	384	(Italy) Lorenzo Camporese	1–7
	KTM	414	(United States) Mason Morris	4–6
	KTM	437	(United States) Vincent Luhovey	4–7
JMC Motorsports	Husqvarna	441	(United States) Scott Meshey	4–7
	KTM	509	(United States) Alexander Nagy	2–7, 16
	Yamaha	512	(United States) Austin Cozadd	1–7, 16–17
Junior Mecanique KTM Canada	KTM	551	(Canada) Guillaume St-Cyr	1–7
Advanced Electric Inc.	Kawasaki	597	(United States) Mason Kerr	3–7, 16
Team Solitaire Nuclear Blast Yamaha	Yamaha	621	(United States) RJ Wageman	16–17
	KTM	625	(United States) Jonah Geistler	1–7, 16–17
Alien Lab CBD	Yamaha	637	(United States) Bobby Piazza	3–7
	KTM	675	(United States) Kyle Dillin	4–7
	KTM	693	(United States) Rene Garcia	1–7, 16
Tech32 KTM	KTM	773	(France) Thomas Do	1–7, 16–17
	Honda	914	(Australia) Geran Stapleton	1, 16–17
	Husqvarna	974	(United States) Brian Marty	16–17

=== Championship Standings ===
Pos	Rider	Bike	HO1 (Texas)	HO2 (Texas)	HO3 (Texas)	IN1 (Indiana)	IN2 (Indiana)	IN3 (Indiana)	ORL (Florida)	SL1 (Utah)	SL2 (Utah)	Points
1	(United States) Colt Nichols	Yamaha	3	2	1	1	1	3	2	3	2	210
2	(Japan) Jo Shimoda	Kawasaki	4	5	4	3	4	2	4	1	6	181
3	(Australia) Jett Lawrence	Honda	6	1	3	4	DNS	5	1	2	1	177
4	(United States) Christian Craig	Yamaha	1	3	2	5	2	1	3	DNQ		158
5	(United States) Michael Mosiman	Gas Gas	7	4	5	2	3	DNQ		4	15	124
6	(United States) Joshua Osby	Honda	10	10	7	9	8	6	8	22	16	111
7	(United States) Joshua Varize	KTM	12	17	11	11	7	16	6	6	17	104
8	(France) Thomas Do	KTM	16	12	10	7	19	9	14	5	14	101
9	(United States) Mitchell Oldenburg	Honda	8	7	20	6	20	4	5			91
10	(United States) Logan Karnow	Kawasaki	17	18	12	22	9	12	10	7	20	80
11	(United States) Grant Harlan	Honda	14	16	18	10	5	11	16			71
12	(United States) Kevin Moranz	KTM	13	DNQ	9	15	10	14	7			70
13	(United States) John Short	Suzuki	11	11	8	8	DNS	DNQ		10	DNQ	68
14	(United States) Luke Neese	Honda	DNQ	15	17	DNQ	17	10	12	11	19	60
15	(United States) Jeremy Hand	Honda	21	13	14	13	6	13	22			59
16	(United States) Devin Simonson	Kawasaki	DNQ	20	DNQ	14	DNQ	8	11	12	DNQ	50
17	(United States) Max Vohland	KTM	9	8	6	DNQ						46
18	(United States) Hunter Sayles	KTM	15	14	DNQ	12	DNQ	7	21			46
19	(United States) Hunter Schlosser	Yamaha	DNQ	DNQ	DNQ	16	16	21	9	9	DNQ	44
20	(United States) Wilson Fleming	Honda	DNQ	DNQ	15	17	11	19	18	17	DNQ	41
21	(United States) Austin Forkner	Kawasaki	2	6	DNQ							40
22	(United States) Lane Shaw	KTM	DNQ	DNQ	16	18	12	DNQ	13	21	DNQ	35
23	(United States) RJ Hampshire	Husqvarna	5	9	DNQ							32
24	(Italy) Lorenzo Camporese	Kawasaki	19	DNQ	DNQ	21	14	22	20			19
25	(United States) Maxwell Sanford	Honda	DNQ	DNQ		20	DNQ	20	19	15	DNQ	18
26	(United States) Alexander Nagy	KTM		DNQ	DNQ	DNQ	DNQ	DNQ	15	14		17
27	(Australia) Geran Stapleton	Honda	DNQ							8	22	16
28	(United States) Devin Harriman	KTM	DNQ	DNQ	19	DNQ	13	DNQ	DNQ			14
29	(United States) TJ Albright	Kawasaki	20	22	13	DNQ						14
30	(United States) Vincent Luhovey	KTM				DNQ	18	15	DNQ			13
31	(United States) Scott Meshey	Husqvarna				DNQ	DNQ	18	17			11
32	(United States) Max Miller	KTM	18	DNQ	DNQ	19	21					11
33	(United States) RJ Wageman	Yamaha								13	DNQ	10
34	(United States) Curren Thurman	Husqvarna	DNQ	21	DNQ	DNQ	15	DNQ	DNQ	DNQ		10
35	(United States) Bobby Piazza	Yamaha			21	DNQ	DNQ	17	DNQ			8
36	(United States) Justin Rodbell	Kawasaki								16		7
37	(United States) Jonah Geistler	KTM	DNQ	DNQ	22	DNQ	DNQ	DNQ	DNQ	18	DNQ	6
38	(United Kingdom) Dylan Woodcock	Kawasaki	22	19	DNQ							5
39	(United States) Brian Marty	Husqvarna								19	DNQ	4
40	(United States) Mason Kerr	Kawasaki			DNQ	DNQ	DNQ	DNQ	DNQ	20		3
	(United States) Austin Cozadd	Yamaha	DNQ	DNQ	DNQ	DNQ	DNQ	DNQ	DNQ	DNQ	DNQ	0
	(United States) Rene Garcia	KTM	DNQ	DNQ	DNQ	DNQ	DNQ	DNQ	DNQ	DNQ		0
	(United States) Chad Saultz	KTM	DNQ	DNQ	DNQ	DNQ	DNQ	DNQ	DNQ			0
	(Canada) Guillaume St-Cyr	KTM	DNQ	DNQ	DNQ	DNQ	DNQ	DNQ	DNQ			0
	(United States) Vincent Murphy	Husqvarna	DNQ	DNQ	DNQ			DNQ	DNQ			0
	(United States) Carter Gordon	Honda	DNQ	DNQ	DNQ	DNQ						0
	(United States) Kyle Dillin	KTM				DNQ	DNQ	DNQ	DNQ			0
	(United States) Mason Morris	KTM				DNQ	DNQ	DNQ				0
	(Brazil) Enzo Lopes	Honda	DNQ									0
	(Canada) Jess Pettis	KTM	DNQ									0
	(United States) Wyatt Lyonsmith	KTM	DNQ									0
Pos	Rider	Bike	HO1 (Texas)	HO2 (Texas)	HO3 (Texas)	IN1 (Indiana)	IN2 (Indiana)	IN3 (Indiana)	ORL (Florida)	SL1 (Utah)	SL2 (Utah)	Points

== 250 SX West ==
=== Entry list ===
Team	Constructor	No	Rider	Rounds
Monster Energy Star Yamaha Racing	Yamaha	6	(United States) Jeremy Martin	8
Monster Energy Star Yamaha Racing	Yamaha	32	(United States) Justin Cooper	8–15, 17
Monster Energy Star Yamaha Racing	Yamaha	59	(United States) Jarrett Frye	8–15, 17
Monster Energy Star Yamaha Racing	Yamaha	91	(United States) Nate Thrasher	8–15
Manluk Rock River Merge Racing Team	Yamaha	26	(United States) Alex Martin	8–11
Monster Energy Pro Circuit Kawasaki	Kawasaki	31	(United States) Cameron McAdoo	8–15, 17
Monster Energy Pro Circuit Kawasaki	Kawasaki	80	(United States) Jordon Smith	8–12
Monster Energy Pro Circuit Kawasaki	Kawasaki	150	(United States) Seth Hammaker	8–15, 17
BARX Chaparral Ecstar Suzuki	Suzuki	33	(United States) Derek Drake	13–15
BARX Chaparral Ecstar Suzuki	Suzuki	90	(United States) Dilan Schwartz	8–9, 13–15, 17
BARX Chaparral Ecstar Suzuki	Suzuki	137	(United States) Sean Cantrell	8, 13–15
Muc-Off Honda	Honda	35	(United States) Mitchell Harrison	8–15, 17
FXR Chaparral Honda	Honda	39	(United States) Carson Mumford	8–14
FXR Chaparral Honda	Honda	72	(United States) Coty Schock	8–15, 17
Team Honda HRC	Honda	41	(Australia) Hunter Lawrence	8–15, 17
Troy Lee Designs Red Bull Gas Gas	Gas Gas	45	(United States) Pierce Brown	9–10, 13–15, 17
Troy Lee Designs Red Bull Gas Gas	Gas Gas	264	(United States) Ryan Sipes	9, 13–14
Rockstar Energy Husqvarna Factory Racing Team	Husqvarna	47	(United States) Jalek Swoll	8–15, 17
Rockstar Energy Husqvarna Factory Racing Team	Husqvarna	67	(United States) Stilez Robertson	8–11, 13–15
ClubMX	Yamaha	48	(United States) Garrett Marchbanks	8–15, 17
ClubMX	Yamaha	61	(United States) Joey Crown	8–9
ClubMX	Yamaha	68	(United States) Jace Owen	8, 10–15
ClubMX	Yamaha	155	(United States) Nathan Augustin	9–15
ClubMX	Yamaha	464	(Germany) Dominique Thury	8–15, 17
Phoenix Racing Honda	Honda	50	(Brazil) Enzo Lopes	11–15, 17
Phoenix Racing Honda	Honda	56	(United States) Kyle Peters	8, 10–15, 17
Invictus Speed Crew	KTM	53	(United States) Jake Masterpool	8–11
3D Racing Yamaha	Yamaha	54	(United States) Nick Gaines	9
AJE Motorsports Motul	Gas Gas	60	(United States) Chris Blose	8–15
AJE Motorsports Motul	Gas Gas	73	(United States) Derek Kelley	8–15, 17
AJE Motorsports Motul	Gas Gas	201	(France) Cedric Soubeyras	10–15, 17
JMC Motorsports	Husqvarna	63	(Ecuador) Martin Castelo	8–9
JMC Motorsports	Husqvarna	65	(United States) Carson Brown	8
JMC Motorsports	Husqvarna	220	(Brazil) Ramyller Alves	9–11, 13–14, 17
DWR Yamaha	Yamaha	66	(United States) Jordan Bailey	8–11
Team Solitaire Nuclear Blast Yamaha	Yamaha	69	(United States) Robbie Wageman	8–15, 17
Team Solitaire Nuclear Blast Yamaha	Yamaha	93	(Chile) Hardy Muñoz	8–13
AEO Powersports	Gas Gas	75	(United States) Ty Masterpool	8–14
AEO Powersports	KTM	830	(United States) Ezra Lewis	10–12
NextGen Motorsports	Husqvarna	77	(United States) Jerry Robin	8–15, 17
House of Kawasaki	Kawasaki	92	(United States) Chase Marquier	8–13
	Gas Gas	118	(United States) Cheyenne Harmon	8, 10–15
	KTM	119	(United States) Logan Boye	8–9, 13–15
Team Faith	Kawasaki	120	(United States) Todd Bannister	8–15
Westside Motorsports	Kawasaki	121	(United States) Chris Howell	8–15
Family Powersports	Kawasaki	128	(United States) Carter Halpain	9
DMP Motorsports	Honda	138	(United States) David Pulley	8–12, 14–15
Tech Service Racing	KTM	157	(United States) Hunter Calle	8–14
	KTM	158	(Mexico) Tre Fierro	9–14
Big MX Radio	Yamaha	163	(United States) Cameron Mitchell	9, 13–14
Storm Lake Tilube Honda	Honda	182	(United States) Izaih Clark	10, 13–15
Team 2B Moraco	Gas Gas	201	(France) Cedric Soubeyras	8–9
	KTM	204	(United States) Kyle Greeson	8–15
	Kawasaki	208	(United States) Logan Leitzel	8–12
EBR Performance	KTM	220	(Brazil) Ramyller Alves	8
	Yamaha	242	(United States) Garrett Hoffman	8–15
Epcon Partners	Yamaha	246	(United States) Chance Blackburn	8–15
Brock Papi Racing	KTM	247	(United States) Brock Papi	13–15
Team TPJ Fly Racing	Husqvarna	259	(United States) Corbin Hayes	8–12
Team TPJ Fly Racing	Honda	446	(United States) Blaine Silveira	8–15
Team TPJ Fly Racing	Kawasaki	647	(United States) Matthew Hubert	8–12
Team TPJ Fly Racing	Kawasaki	767	(United States) Mason Wharton	8–15
	KTM	272	(United States) Wristin Grigg	8–9
	Husqvarna	281	(United States) Cory Carsten	10–15
Carlson Racing	Husqvarna	300	(Canada) Casey Keast	10–12
Red Dog MX Academy	Husqvarna	312	(United States) Marines Gonzalez	8–9
	KTM	321	(Zambia) Bradley Lionnet	8–15
Bobby Js Yamaha	Yamaha	357	(United States) Kameron Barboa	9–15
Travco Motorsports	Yamaha	371	(United States) Dawson Ryker	13–15
	Yamaha	372	(United States) Hayden Hefner	8–9
	Yamaha	412	(United States) Jared Lesher	8–11, 13–14
	Yamaha	428	(United States) Chad Stonier	8–12
Stillwater Powersports	Yamaha	434	(United States) Dustin Winter	9–15
Big St Charles Motorsports	KTM	460	(United States) Michael Hicks	10–14
	Yamaha	483	(United States) Bryton Carroll	8–9
	KTM	504	(Honduras) Gerhard Matamoros	9–12
Full Throttle Motorsports	Kawasaki	528	(United States) Ryan Peters	10–12
VPE Nash Motorsports	Yamaha	538	(United States) Addison Emory	8–15
TMX Competition	KTM	611	(France) Calvin Fonvieille	8, 10–12
Power House Farms	KTM	645	(United States) Colby Copp	9–15
	KTM	711	(United States) Tristan Lane	8
Lonesome Camel CBD	Kawasaki	726	(United States) Gared Steinke	11–15
	Yamaha	815	(United States) Colton Eigenmann	8–11
Team PR-MX	Kawasaki	951	(United States) Ryan Surratt	8–15, 17

=== Championship Standings ===
Pos	Rider	Bike	ORL (Florida)	DAY (Florida)	AR1 (Texas)	AR2 (Texas)	AR3 (Texas)	HA1 (Georgia (U.S. state))	HA2 (Georgia (U.S. state))	HA3 (Georgia (U.S. state))	SLC (Utah)	Points
1	(United States) Justin Cooper	Yamaha	1	4	4	5	1	2	1	2	9	194
2	(Australia) Hunter Lawrence	Honda	5	6	2	1	5	7	2	4	3	181
3	(United States) Cameron McAdoo	Kawasaki	2	1	3	10	2	3	3	13	4	177
4	(United States) Seth Hammaker	Kawasaki	6	11	1	11	3	4	9	3	5	160
5	(United States) Jalek Swoll	Husqvarna	4	8	6	2	4	8	10	6	8	153
6	(United States) Garrett Marchbanks	Yamaha	3	5	5	4	6	14	5	18	11	137
7	(United States) Nate Thrasher	Yamaha	11	20	10	9	9	1	4	1		127
8	(United States) Kyle Peters	Honda	7		12	3	8	5	11	5	10	124
9	(United States) Coty Schock	Honda	12	9	11	12	14	10	7	10	18	104
10	(United States) Mitchell Harrison	Honda	15	22	8	6	DNQ	6	6	8	DNQ	90
11	(United States) Chris Blose	Gas Gas	8	15	9	8	7	13	15	DNS		88
12	(United States) Pierce Brown	Gas Gas		3	DNQ			9	8	14	16	75
13	(United States) Stilez Robertson	Husqvarna	18	2	7	22		11	DNQ	DNS		58
14	(France) Cedric Soubeyras	Gas Gas	16	16	17	18	15	15	19	12	DNQ	56
15	(United States) Jarrett Frye	Yamaha	19	12	21	DNQ	10	DNQ	16	15	13	55
16	(Brazil) Enzo Lopes	Honda				16	17	18	17	7	12	51
17	(United States) Jace Owen	Yamaha	10		19	15	11	DNQ	12	20		51
18	(United States) Ty Masterpool	Gas Gas	DNQ	17	18	13	DNQ	16	13			38
19	(Brazil) Ramyller Alves	KTM	14									38
19	(Brazil) Ramyller Alves	Husqvarna		DNQ	13	20		DNQ	14	16	DNQ	38
20	(United States) Robbie Wageman	Yamaha	9	DNQ	16	14	16	DNQ	DNQ	DNQ	DNQ	37
21	(United States) Jordon Smith	Kawasaki	20	10	22	7	DNQ					33
22	(United States) Alex Martin	Yamaha	21	7	14	DNQ						26
23	(United States) Dilan Schwartz	Suzuki	17	DNQ				DNQ	20	9	21	25
24	(Germany) Dominique Thury	Yamaha	DNQ	DNQ	DNQ	17	13	17	DNQ	DNQ	DNQ	22
25	(United States) Carson Mumford	Honda	DNQ	19	DNQ	19	12	DNQ	22			20
26	(United States) Jordan Bailey	Yamaha	DNQ	14	15	21						19
27	(United States) Derek Kelley	Gas Gas	DNQ	DNQ	DNQ	DNQ	22	19	DNQ	11	DNQ	17
28	(United States) Ryan Sipes	Gas Gas		21				12	DNQ			13
29	(Chile) Hardy Muñoz	Yamaha	DNQ	13	DNQ	DNQ	20	DNQ				13
30	(United States) Joey Crown	Yamaha	13	DNQ								10
31	(United States) Jerry Robin	Husqvarna	DNQ	DNQ	DNQ	DNQ	DNQ	22	18	19	DNQ	10
32	(United States) Ryan Surratt	Kawasaki	DNQ	18	20	DNQ	DNQ	DNQ	DNQ	DNQ	DNQ	8
33	(United States) Sean Cantrell	Suzuki	DNQ					DNQ	DNQ	17		6
34	(United States) Cheyenne Harmon	Gas Gas	DNQ		DNQ	DNQ	18	DNQ	DNQ	DNQ		5
35	(France) Calvin Fonvieille	KTM	DNQ		DNQ	DNQ	19					4
36	(United States) Derek Drake	Suzuki						21	21	DNQ		4
37	(United States) Gared Steinke	Kawasaki				DNQ	DNQ	20	DNQ	DNQ		3
38	(United States) Jeremy Martin	Yamaha	22									1
39	(United States) Michael Hicks	KTM			DNQ	DNQ	21	DNQ	DNQ			2
	(Zambia) Bradley Lionnet	KTM	DNQ	DNQ	DNQ	DNQ	DNQ	DNQ	DNQ	DNQ		0
	(United States) Chris Howell	Kawasaki	DNQ	DNQ	DNQ	DNQ	DNQ	DNQ	DNQ	DNQ		0
	(United States) Garrett Hoffman	Yamaha	DNQ	DNQ	DNQ	DNQ	DNQ	DNQ	DNQ	DNQ		0
	(United States) Blaine Silveira	Honda	DNQ	DNQ	DNQ	DNQ	DNQ	DNQ	DNQ	DNQ		0
	(United States) Kyle Greeson	KTM	DNQ	DNQ	DNQ	DNQ	DNQ	DNQ	DNQ	DNQ		0
	(United States) Addison Emory	Yamaha	DNQ	DNQ	DNQ	DNQ	DNQ	DNQ	DNQ	DNQ		0
	(United States) Todd Bannister	Kawasaki	DNQ	DNQ	DNQ	DNQ	DNQ	DNQ	DNQ	DNQ		0
	(United States) Chance Blackburn	Yamaha	DNQ	DNQ	DNQ	DNQ	DNQ	DNQ	DNQ	DNQ		0
	(United States) Mason Wharton	Kawasaki	DNQ	DNQ	DNQ	DNQ	DNQ	DNQ	DNQ	DNQ		0
	(United States) Hunter Calle	KTM	DNQ	DNQ	DNQ	DNQ	DNQ	DNQ	DNQ			0
	(United States) David Pulley	Honda	DNQ	DNQ	DNQ	DNQ	DNQ		DNQ	DNQ		0
	(United States) Dustin Winter	Yamaha		DNQ	DNQ	DNQ	DNQ	DNQ	DNQ	DNQ		0
	(United States) Colby Copp	KTM		DNQ	DNQ	DNQ	DNQ	DNQ	DNQ	DNQ		0
	(United States) Nathan Augustin	Yamaha		DNQ	DNQ	DNQ	DNQ	DNQ	DNQ	DNQ		0
	(United States) Kameron Barboa	Yamaha		DNQ	DNQ	DNQ	DNQ	DNQ	DNQ	DNQ		0
	(United States) Chase Marquier	Kawasaki	DNQ	DNQ	DNQ	DNQ	DNQ	DNQ				0
	(United States) Jared Lesher	Yamaha	DNQ	DNQ	DNQ	DNQ		DNQ	DNQ			0
	(Mexico) Tre Fierro	KTM		DNQ	DNQ	DNQ	DNQ	DNQ	DNQ			0
	(United States) Cory Carsten	Husqvarna			DNQ	DNQ	DNQ	DNQ	DNQ	DNQ		0
	(United States) Logan Leitzel	Kawasaki	DNQ	DNQ	DNQ	DNQ	DNQ					0
	(United States) Corbin Hayes	Husqvarna	DNQ	DNQ	DNQ	DNQ	DNQ					0
	(United States) Matthew Hubert	Kawasaki	DNQ	DNQ	DNQ	DNQ	DNQ					0
	(United States) Chad Stonier	Yamaha	DNQ	DNQ	DNQ	DNQ	DNQ					0
	(United States) Logan Boye	KTM	DNQ	DNQ				DNQ	DNQ	DNQ		0
	(United States) Colton Eigenmann	Yamaha	DNQ	DNQ	DNQ	DNQ						0
	(United States) Jake Masterpool	KTM	DNQ	DNQ	DNQ	DNQ						0
	(Honduras) Gerhard Matamoros	KTM		DNQ	DNQ	DNQ	DNQ					0
	(United States) Izaih Clark	Honda			DNQ			DNQ	DNQ	DNQ		0
	(United States) Cameron Mitchell	Yamaha		DNQ				DNQ	DNQ			0
	(Canada) Casey Keast	Husqvarna			DNQ	DNQ	DNQ					0
	(United States) Ryan Peters	Kawasaki			DNQ	DNQ	DNQ					0
	(United States) Ezra Lewis	KTM			DNQ	DNQ	DNQ					0
	(United States) Dawson Ryker	Yamaha						DNQ	DNQ	DNQ		0
	(United States) Brock Papi	KTM						DNQ	DNQ	DNQ		0
	(Ecuador) Martin Castelo	Husqvarna	DNQ	DNQ								0
	(United States) Bryton Carroll	Yamaha	DNQ	DNQ								0
	(United States) Marines Gonzalez	Husqvarna	DNQ	DNQ								0
	(United States) Wristin Grigg	KTM	DNQ	DNQ								0
	(United States) Hayden Hefner	Yamaha	DNQ	DNQ								0
	(United States) Carson Brown	Husqvarna	DNQ									0
	(United States) Tristan Lane	KTM	DNQ									0
	(United States) Carter Halpain	Kawasaki		DNQ								0
	(United States) Nick Gaines	Yamaha		DNQ								0
Pos	Rider	Bike	ORL (Florida)	DAY (Florida)	AR1 (Texas)	AR2 (Texas)	AR3 (Texas)	HA1 (Georgia (U.S. state))	HA2 (Georgia (U.S. state))	HA3 (Georgia (U.S. state))	SLC (Utah)	Points
