= 2022 AMA Supercross Championship =

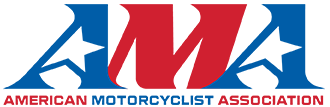
- Organizer: American Motorcyclist Association, Feld Entertainment (except Daytona), NASCAR Holdings, Inc. (Daytona)
- Discipline: Supercross
- Duration: January – May 2022
- Number of races: 17
- TV partners: NBC Sports (NBC, USA Network, CNBC, Peacock)

Champions
- 450cc: (United States) Eli Tomac
- 250cc West: (United States) Christian Craig
- 250cc East: (Australia) Jett Lawrence

AMA Supercross Championship
- ← 2021 2023 →

The 2022 AMA Supercross season is the 49th season of professional stadium off-road motorcycle racing in the United States.

== Season overview ==
The season began on January 8 at Angel Stadium in Anaheim, California, running until the final race in Salt Lake City, in late May.

In round 3 at San Diego, Chase Sexton and Michael Mosiman each won their first events in the 450cc and 250cc classes respectively.

Eli Tomac won his sixth career Daytona Supercross race at Round 9, eclipsing Ricky Carmichael's record for the most top class wins at Daytona. With the victory, he also tied Ryan Villopoto for the fifth-most wins in the AMA's premier class.

Eli Tomac clinched the title at round 16 in Denver, CO with a 5th place finish over runner-up, and winner of the race, Jason Anderson.

== Season results ==
Race Winners
Round (250 East/West)	Date	Location	Stadium	450SX Winner	250SX Winner	TV Broadcast
1 (W)	8 January	(California) Anaheim	Angel Stadium	(Germany) Ken Roczen (Honda HRC)	(United States) Christian Craig (Monster Energy Star Yamaha)	CNBC
2 (W)	15 January	(California) Oakland	Ring Central Coliseum	(United States) Jason Anderson (Monster Energy Kawasaki)	(United States) Christian Craig (Monster Energy Star Yamaha)	USA Network
3 (W)	22 January	(California) San Diego	Petco Park	(United States) Chase Sexton (Honda HRC)	(United States) Michael Mosiman (Red Bull Gas Gas)	USA Network
4 (W)	29 January	(California) Anaheim 2	Angel Stadium	(United States) Eli Tomac (Monster Energy Star Yamaha)	(United States) Christian Craig (Monster Energy Star Yamaha)	CNBC (live) / NBC (delayed)
5 (W)	5 February	(Arizona) Glendale (Triple Crown)	State Farm Stadium	(United States) Eli Tomac (Monster Energy Star Yamaha)	(Australia) Hunter Lawrence (Honda HRC)	CNBC
6 (W)	12 February	(California) Anaheim 3	Angel Stadium	(United States) Jason Anderson (Monster Energy Kawasaki)	(United States) Christian Craig (Monster Energy Star Yamaha)	Peacock (live), CNBC (next-day delayed)
7 (E)	19 February	(Minnesota) Minneapolis	U.S. Bank Stadium	(United States) Jason Anderson (Monster Energy Kawasaki)	(Australia) Jett Lawrence (Honda HRC)	CNBC (live) / NBC (delayed)
8 (E)	26 February	(Texas) Arlington (Triple Crown)	AT&T Stadium	(United States) Eli Tomac (Monster Energy Star Yamaha)	(United States) Cameron McAdoo (Monster Energy Kawasaki)	CNBC
9 (E)	March 5	(Florida) Daytona	Daytona International Speedway	(United States) Eli Tomac (Monster Energy Star Yamaha)	(Australia) Jett Lawrence (Honda HRC)	CNBC
10 (E)	March 12	(Michigan) Detroit	Ford Field	(United States) Eli Tomac (Monster Energy Star Yamaha)	(Australia) Jett Lawrence (Honda HRC)	CNBC
11 (E)	March 19	(Indiana) Indianapolis	Lucas Oil Stadium	(United States) Eli Tomac (Monster Energy Star Yamaha)	(Australia) Jett Lawrence (Honda HRC)	CNBC
12 (W)	March 26	(Washington (state)) Seattle	Lumen Field	(United States) Eli Tomac (Monster Energy Star Yamaha)	(Australia) Hunter Lawrence (Honda HRC)	USA Network
13 (E)	April 9	(Missouri) St Louis (Triple Crown)	The Dome at America's Center	(France) Marvin Musquin (Red Bull KTM)	(United States) RJ Hampshire (Rockstar Energy Husqvarna)	CNBC
14 (E/W)	April 16	(Georgia (U.S. state)) Hampton	Atlanta Motor Speedway	(United States) Jason Anderson (Monster Energy Kawasaki)	(Australia) Hunter Lawrence (Honda HRC)	NBC
15 (E)	April 23	(Massachusetts) Foxborough	Gillette Stadium	(United States) Jason Anderson (Monster Energy Kawasaki)	(United States) Austin Forkner (Monster Energy Kawasaki)	NBC
16 (W)	April 30	(Colorado) Denver	Empower Field at Mile High	(United States) Jason Anderson (Monster Energy Kawasaki)	(Australia) Hunter Lawrence (Honda HRC)	NBC
17 (E/W)	May 7	(Utah) Salt Lake City	Rice-Eccles Stadium	(United States) Jason Anderson (Monster Energy Kawasaki)	(United States) Nate Thrasher (Monster Energy Star Yamaha)	CNBC (live) / NBC (delayed)

== Championship standings ==
=== 450SX Rider Standings ===
Rank	Rider	#	Team	Points
1	(United States) Eli Tomac	3	Monster Energy Star Racing Yamaha	359
2	(United States) Jason Anderson	21	Monster Energy Kawasaki	350
3	(United States) Malcolm Stewart	27	Rockstar Energy Husqvarna Factory Racing	314
4	(France) Marvin Musquin	25	Red Bull KTM	305
5	(United States) Justin Barcia	51	Troy Lee Designs Red Bull Gas Gas	302
6	(United States) Chase Sexton	23	Team Honda HRC	292
7	(United States) Cooper Webb	1	Red Bull KTM	278
8	(United States) Brandon Hartranft	41	Twisted Tea/HEP Motorsports Suzuki	178
9	(United States) Justin Brayton	10	SmarTop/Bullfrog Spas/MotoConcepts Honda	176
10	(United Kingdom) Dean Wilson	15	Rockstar Energy Husqvarna Factory Racing	153
11	(France) Dylan Ferrandis	14	Monster Energy Star Racing Yamaha	141
12	(Germany) Ken Roczen	94	Team Honda HRC	133
13	(United States) Justin Bogle	19	Rocky Mountain ATV/MC KTM WPS	114
14	(United States) Kyle Chisholm	11	Monster Energy Star Racing Yamaha	109
15	(United States) Alex Martin	26	Muc-Off FXR ClubMX Yamaha	105

=== 250SX West Rider Standings ===
Rank	Rider	#	Team	Points
1	(United States) Christian Craig	28	Monster Energy Star Racing Yamaha	230
2	(Australia) Hunter Lawrence	96	Team Honda HRC	220
3	(United States) Michael Mosiman	29	Troy Lee Designs Red Bull Gas Gas	197
4	(Japan) Jo Shimoda	30	Monster Energy Pro Circuit Kawasaki	162
5	(United States) Nate Thrasher	49	Monster Energy Star Racing Yamaha	151

=== 250SX East Rider Standings ===
Rank	Rider	#	Team	Points
1	(Australia) Jett Lawrence	18	Team Honda HRC	192
2	(United States) RJ Hampshire	24	Rockstar Energy Husqvarna Factory Racing	158
3	(United States) Pierce Brown	44	Troy Lee Designs/Red Bull/GasGas	149
4	(United States) Mitchell Oldenburg	54	SmarTop/Bullfrog Spas/MotoConcepts Honda	132
5	(Brazil) Enzo Lopes	80	Muc-Off FXR ClubMX Yamaha	117

== Television coverage ==
The 2022 season is covered in its entirety by the NBC family of networks, including NBC, CNBC, USA Network and Peacock.

Network	Coverage
NBC	Six races in total, including Denver, Foxborough and Hampton live, as well as 3 races shown next day delayed, including the final round at Salt Lake City including the 250cc East-West Shootout
USA	3 races live, Oakland, San Diego and Seattle
CNBC	10 races live, 3 replayed on next day delay on NBC. Exclusive coverage of the season opener in Anaheim, as well as the prestigious Daytona event and two of the three triple crown events
Peacock	Every race live, including exclusive coverage of Anaheim 3
