= Cameron McAdoo =

American motocross racer

- Born: December 16, 1997 (age 28); Sioux City, Iowa, U.S.
- Current team: Quadlock Honda Racing

Cameron McAdoo (born December 16, 1997) is an American professional Motocross and Supercross racer. McAdoo has competed in the AMA Supercross and AMA Motocross Championships since 2017.

McAdoo has had his greatest successes to date in Supercross, being a three-time main event winner as well as having multiple podium finishes to his name. He finished third in the 250SX West class in the 2021 AMA Supercross Championship.

McAdoo currently rides for the Quad Lock Honda Racing team, but has also competed for Monster Energy Pro Circuit Kawasaki, GEICO Honda and Troy Lee Designs Red Bull KTM during his professional career.

== Career ==
=== Amateur career ===
McAdoo competed extensively in the American amateur ranks prior to turning pro. In the AMA Amateur National Motocross Championship, McAdoo did not achieve a top-ten overall finish until his final year competing at the championship in 2016. After joining forces with the Smartop MotoConcepts team, he was able to finish fourth overall in the Open Pro Sport class and stand on the final step of the podium in the 250A class for 2016.

Following this, McAdoo was victorious at the Monster Energy Cup supercross event in the Amateur All-Stars class, with a win in the second race combining with seventh in the opening race to give him the overall.

=== Professional career ===
McAdoo made his professional supercross debut in 2017, starting in the 250SX East class of the AMA Supercross Championship for the Smartop Motoconcepts Honda team. By the third round of the series in Toronto, he was able to record his first top-ten finish before sustaining a cut to his hand at the fourth round which required stitches. Whilst recovering from the hand injury, McAdoo was signed by the factory GEICO Honda team as a replacement rider for the injured RJ Hampshire and Chase Sexton. At the final two rounds of the season, he was able to record two more top-ten finishes and following this he made his professional motocross debut with the GEICO team. His season in the 250 class of the AMA Motocross Championship was cut short after a shoulder injury sustained training in the week following the second round.

As part of his deal with the GEICO Honda team, McAdoo was retained for the 2018 season. Once again starting in the 250SX East class, McAdoo was able to achieve a personal best of eighth place at the second round. However, he would be out with a hand injury from the fourth round onwards. After recovering from this injury, McAdoo made a comeback at the fourth round of the 250 class in the AMA National Motocross Championship, finishing fifteenth in the final standings with a best of fifth overall at the tenth round. At the end of the season, McAdoo was drafted into the Penrite Honda Team for the final round of the Australian Supercross Championship, where he won the SX2 class. At the end of 2018, McAdoo lost his ride with the GEICO Honda team but when the team was again hit by injuries pre-season, he was drafted back in for the 2019 AMA Supercross Championship. Competing in the 250SX West class, he finished inside the top-ten in all but one event and at the final round achieved his first professional podium with third in Las Vegas.

Despite his fifth in the final 250SX West supercross standings, McAdoo was out of a ride again as the riders he replaced returned from injury. He was eventually picked up by the Troy Lee Designs Red Bull KTM team to ride in the 2019 AMA National Motocross Championship from the fourth round onwards. He was achieved several top-ten finishes with a best overall of sixth coming at the penultimate round of the 250 class. After the uncertainty around teams in the previous season, McAdoo found a home at the Monster Energy Pro Circuit Kawasaki team for the 2020 season. A crash in practice at the second round of the 250SX West class resulted in a collapsed lung which side lined him until the fifth round. Upon his return, he had a standout performance at the seventh round where he recorded his second professional podium by finishing third at the first Salt Lake City round. Following this, McAdoo was able to finish ninth in the final standings of the 250 class in the AMA Motocross Championship, becoming a consistent feature in the top-ten and recording a fourth overall at round two as his standout result.

The 2021 AMA Supercross Championship saw McAdoo step forward to become a championship contender for the first time. A second at the opening round of the 250SX West championship was followed up by his first ever professional supercross win in Daytona. This win also resulted in him gaining the championship lead following the event for the first time and a further four podiums across the remaining rounds saw him finish third in the final standings behind Justin Cooper and Hunter Lawrence. His breakthrough supercross season was followed by a motocross season that ended at the first round where he picked up a knee injury that took him out for the rest of the year. After recovering from his injury, McAdoo took on the 250SX East class in the 2022 AMA Supercross Championship, which started in the same vain of the previous year. After a second place in the opening round, he took his second professional supercross win in Arlington, once again taking the championship leader's red plate. Over the following three rounds, he did not finish off the podium on each occasion, but, on the press day before the sixth round in St. Louis he sustained a shoulder injury that brought an end to his supercross season. Further injury problems disrupted his campaign in the 2022 AMA National Motocross Championship, resulting in him missing seven rounds of the season.

McAdoo's 2023 AMA Supercross Championship took a course similar to those immediately preceding it. Finishing third at the opening round, he podiumed at three of the next four rounds before picking up a shoulder injury before the sixth round. The injury required significant surgery which took him out for the remainder of the supercross season and the entire motocross season. McAdoo would not compete again until the 2024 AMA Supercross Championship where, in the 250SX East class, he recorded three second places across the first four rounds. At the third round in Indianapolis he took is third ever professional supercross win and with it the championship leader's red plate. McAdoo picked up another second place at the following round. He then crashed a round later in Nashville with his Pro Circuit teammate Levi Kitchen, sustaining a broken scapula and a partial shoulder muscle tear which ended his supercross season. Due to setbacks in his recovery from this injury, McAdoo missed the entire 2024 AMA National Motocross Championship.

In the build up to the 2025 AMA Supercross Championship, it as revealed that McAdoo had torn his ACL whilst practicing. Despite this injury, McAdoo raced the opening round of the 250SX East class and was able to finish on the podium in third. At the second round in Detroit, he crashed out and caused a red flag in the race. McAdoo withdrew from the third round in Daytona after the heat races and announced he would be having surgery on the injured knee, which ruled him out for the rest of the supercross season. McAdoo returned to compete in the 250SX West class of the 2026 AMA Supercross Championship, where he scored three podiums over the first half of the season. An arm injury ruled him out for two rounds in the latter part of the season, eventually finishing seventh in the final standings. McAdoo missed the entire outdoor season and it was announced that he would not be back at the Pro Circuit team for 2027. With him likely to land at the Quad Lock Honda squad going forward, McAdoo had a unique deal to ride at the opening round of the 2026 FIM Supercross World Championship, where he rode a Kawasaki from Pro Circuit under the Quad Lock awning. McAdoo finished the event in third overall but the remaining rounds of the series were then cancelled due to funding issues for the promoters. He made his final appearance for Pro Circuit Kawasaki in the three-round SuperMotocross playoffs, in which he finished 11th in the standings.

== Honours ==
AMA Supercross Championship

- 250SX West: 2021 (bronze)

Monster Energy Cup

- Amateur All-Stars: 2016 (gold)

AMA Amateur National Motocross Championship

- 250A: 2016 (bronze)

== AMA Supercross/Motocross Results ==
Year	Rnd 1	Rnd 2	Rnd 3	Rnd 4	Rnd 5	Rnd 6	Rnd 7	Rnd 8	Rnd 9	Rnd 10	Rnd 11	Rnd 12	Rnd 13	Rnd 14	Rnd 15	Rnd 16	Rnd 17	Average Finish	Podium Percent	Place
~2021 250 SX-W	-	-	-	-	-	-	-	2	1	3	10	2	3	3	13	-	4	4.56	67%	3rd
2024 250 SX-E	-	-	-	-	15	-	2	2	2	1	-	-	2	22	OUT	-	OUT	6.57	71%	6th
2025 250 SX-E	-	-	-	-	3	DNF	-	DNS	OUT	OUT	-	OUT	OUT	OUT	OUT	-	OUT	3.00	100%	23rd
2025 250 MX	OUT	OUT	OUT	OUT	OUT	OUT	OUT	OUT	OUT	OUT	OUT	-	-	-	-	-	-	-	-	-
2026 250 SX-W	22 ANA (California)	2 SDI (California)	4 ANA (California)	3 HOU (Texas)	3 GLE (Arizona)	5 SEA (Washington (state))	-	-	-	OUT BIR (Alabama)	-	OUT STL (Missouri)	-	-	-	13 DEN (Colorado)	DNF SLC (Utah)	6.50	38%	7th
