= Pierce Brown (motorcyclist) =

American motocross racer

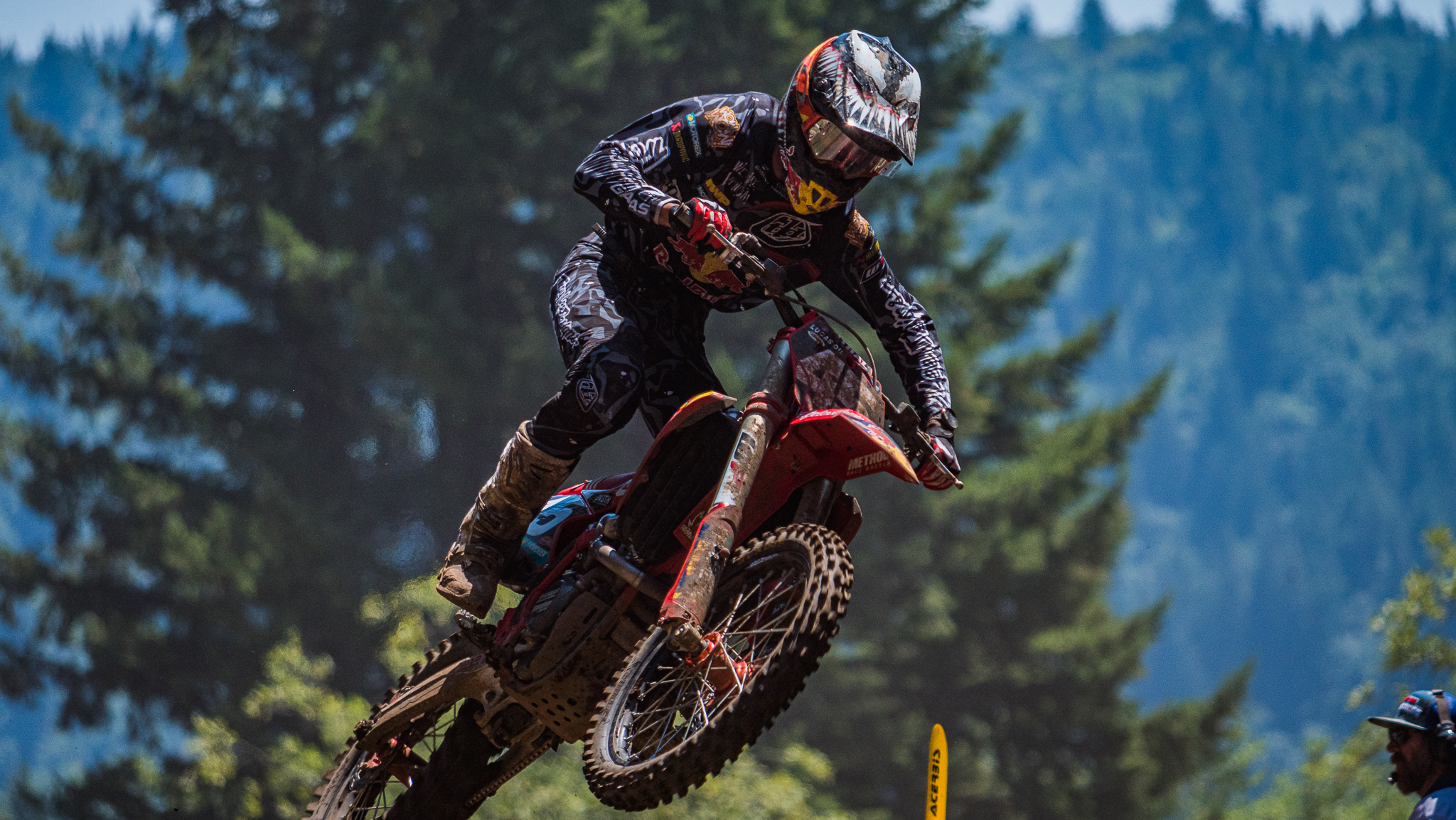
- Brown In 2021
- Nationality: American
- Born: 3 June 2002 (age 24); Sandy, Utah
- Current team: Monster Energy Yamaha Star Racing

Pierce Brown (born 3 June 2002) is an American professional motocross and Supercross racer. Brown took his first professional supercross win during the 2026 AMA Supercross Championship, having previously won the final of the 2024 SuperMotocross World Championship.

After his full-time professional debut in the 2020 season, Brown competed until the end of the 2024 season with the Troy Lee Designs team.

Brown's best results have typically come in supercross, where he has scored several podiums and finished third in the 250SX East class of the 2022 AMA Supercross Championship.

== Career ==
=== Junior career ===
Brown worked his way through the ranks of the American amateur system. He quickly achieved success at a national-level, when still at a young age, by winning the 65 (7–9) Stock at the 2012 AMA Amateur National Motocross Championship. This title went down in the record books as being the first for the American Cobra brand at the event. After competing on a Yamaha 2013, Brown began his long association with KTM the following season. This saw him pick up a title in the Mini Sr 2 (12–14) as well as three second-place finishes whilst on a 250 in 2017 and 2018.

During the 2017 season, Brown finished second in the All-Stars class at the Monster Energy Cup supercross event.

=== 250 Career ===
After being part of the Troy Lee Designs Red Bull KTM amateur team for a few years, Brown made his professional debut for the team at the Florida round of the 2019 AMA National Motocross Championship. After finishing twelfth overall, which included a tenth place in the second race, Brown made his full-time debut with the team during the COVID-19 pandemic-impacted 2020 season. He missed the opening two rounds of the 250SX East class of the 2020 AMA Supercross Championship due to injuring a nerve underneath his shoulder blade. After making his supercross debut at the third round in Atlanta, Brown was able to record four top-six finishes, with a best of fourth place at two events to finish ninth in the final standings. At the fifth round of the 2020 AMA National Motocross Championship, Brown sustained a knee injury which left him ending his first full season on the side-lines.

For the 2021 season, Brown's Troy Lee Designs team became the official Gas Gas team in American racing. Switching to the 250SX West class, Brown secured his first professional podium by finishing third at the second round of the 2021 AMA Supercross Championship at Daytona. He missed the next three rounds due to a broken hand and eventually finished 12th in the final standings. Brown's best result in the 2021 AMA National Motocross Championship was fifth overall at the seventh round at Washougal. At the following round, he broke his collarbone and suffered concussion which ended his race season. The 2022 AMA Supercross Championship would see Brown visit the podium three times in the 250SX East class and finish the season in third in the final standings. As part of this, he led a professional supercross race for the first time when he was at the head of the field at the Foxborough round for fourteen laps. He stayed injury free and completed a full season of the AMA Motocross Championship in 2022, scoring four top-ten overall results to finish tenth in the final standings.

Brown missed the last two rounds of the 2023 AMA Supercross Championship due to a hand injury and finished the 250SX West class eighth in the final standings. Due to this, he missed all but the last five rounds of the 2023 AMA National Motocross Championship, where he had two tenth overall finished on his return. Brown was consistent in the 250SX East class of the 2024 AMA Supercross Championship, finishing in the top five in each of the first six rounds. He would eventually finish the season in fourth, one point away from third in the final standings. Brown was also consistent throughout the 2024 AMA National Motocross Championship, with three top-six overall finishes resulting in eighth in the final standings of the 250 class. At the season ending 2024 SuperMotocross World Championship final rounds, Brown was able to take his first professional victory at the last event in Las Vegas. This victory was enough for him to finish third in the final standings of the 250SMX class.

At the end of the 2024 season, it was announced that Brown would be leaving the Troy Lee Designs team for the first time in his professional career and joining the Monster Energy Yamaha Star Racing team for 2025. Making his debut for the team in the 250SX East class of the 2025 AMA Supercross Championship, Brown was leading the main event at the opening round in Tampa before crashing out. The crash left him with broken vertebra requiring surgery, ruling him out for the rest of the championship. Brown was able to come back for the ninth round of the 2025 AMA National Motocross Championship. In the opening race he crashed and sustained a concussion, ending his 2025 season altogether.

Brown started the 2026 AMA Supercross Championship in the 250SX East class, where at the opening round in Arlington, Texas, he was able to take his first professional supercross victory. He followed this up with a third place at the second round, before a crash at the fourth round caused a broken wrist and dislocated shoulder, ending his campaign. Brown returned to action at the eighth round of the 2026 AMA National Motocross Championship building up to decent results by the end of the season, including fifth overall at the last round. He carried this into the 2026 SuperMotocross World Championship playoff rounds, where he finished sixth and fifth in the final two of these, to end eighth in the standings.

== Honours ==
SuperMotocross World Championship

- 250SMX: 2024 (bronze)

AMA Supercross Championship

- 250SX East: 2022 (bronze)

Monster Energy Cup

- Amateur All-Stars: 2017 (silver)

AMA Amateur National Motocross Championship

- 250 B: 2018 (silver)
- Schoolboy 2 (12–17) B/C: 2017 & 2018 (silver)
- Schoolboy 1 (12–16) B/C: 2016 (bronze)
- Mini Sr 2 (12–14): 2015 (gold)
- 85 (9–11) Limited: 2014 (silver)
- 65 (7–9) Stock: 2012 (gold)
- 51 (7–8) AMA 2 Stock: 2011 (bronze)

== Career statistics ==
=== AMA Supercross Championship ===
==== By season ====
Season	Class	Number	Motorcycle	Team	Overall Wins	Overall Podium	Pts	Plcd
2020	250SX East	163	KTM	Troy Lee Designs Red Bull KTM	0	0	92	9th
2021	250SX West	45	Gas Gas	Troy Lee Designs Red Bull Gas Gas	0	1	75	12th
2022	250SX East	44	Gas Gas	Troy Lee Designs Red Bull Gas Gas	0	3	149	3rd
2023	250SX West	33	Gas Gas	Troy Lee Designs Red Bull Gas Gas	0	0	98	8th
2024	250SX East	39	Gas Gas	Troy Lee Designs Red Bull Gas Gas	0	0	131	4th
2025	250SX East	20	Yamaha	Monster Energy Yamaha Star Racing	0	0	2	41st
2026	250SX East	163	Yamaha	Monster Energy Yamaha Star Racing	1	2	63	11th
Total					1	6	610	

=== AMA National Motocross Championship ===
==== By season ====
Season	Class	Number	Motorcycle	Team	Races	Race Wins	Overall Wins	Race Top-3	Overall Podium	Pts	Plcd
2019	250	363	KTM	Troy Lee Designs Red Bull KTM	2	0	0	0	0	18	31st
2020	250	163	KTM	Troy Lee Designs Red Bull KTM	8	0	0	0	0	36	22nd
2021	250	45	Gas Gas	Troy Lee Designs Red Bull Gas Gas	16	0	0	0	0	126	18th
2022	250	44	Gas Gas	Troy Lee Designs Red Bull Gas Gas	24	0	0	0	0	198	10th
2023	250	33	Gas Gas	Troy Lee Designs Red Bull Gas Gas	10	0	0	0	0	76	19th
2024	250	39	Gas Gas	Troy Lee Designs Red Bull Gas Gas	22	0	0	0	0	269	8th
2025	250	20	Yamaha	Monster Energy Yamaha Star Racing	1	0	0	0	0	0	N/A
2026	250	163	Yamaha	Monster Energy Yamaha Star Racing	8	0	0	0	0	68	24th
Total					91	0	0	0	0	791	
