= Nate Thrasher =

American motocross racer

Nathanael Thrasher
- Nationality: American
- Born: 9 December 2002 (age 23) Livingston, Tennessee

Motocross career
- Years active: 2020-Present
- Teams: •Monster Energy Star Racing Yamaha (2020-2026); •Monster Energy Pro Circuit Kawasaki (2026-Present)
- Wins: •AMA 250cc Supercross: 7

Nathanael Thrasher (born 9 December 2002) is an American professional Motocross and Supercross racer. Thrasher has competed professionally in the AMA Supercross Championship and AMA Motocross Championship since 2020.

After picking up titles in the amateur ranks in America, Thrasher has ridden for his entire professional career to date for the Monster Energy Star Racing Yamaha team.

Thrasher has had particular success in supercross, picking up several wins and podiums in the AMA Supercross Championship.

== Career ==
=== Amateur career ===
Thrasher worked his way through the ranks of the American amateur system, achieving his most notable results in 2018, where he took a clean sweep of race wins in Supermini 1 and Supermini 2, taking both class titles in the AMA Amateur National Motocross Championship. He missed the championship in 2019 due to injury and achieved two second placed class finishes at his final appearance in 2020.

=== Professional career ===
Thrasher was initially scheduled to make his professional debut for the Troy Lee Designs Red Bull KTM team in late 2020, however, due to complications he was instead picked up by the Monster Energy Star Racing Yamaha team. As part of this setup, he made his professional debut at the penultimate round of the 2020 AMA National Motocross Championship in the 250 class. At the final round, Thrasher finished tenth in the second race.

Thrasher made his professional supercross debut during the 2021 AMA Supercross Championship in the 250SX West class. He quickly found his footing in the class, showing this by winning the sixth round in difficult conditions. He returned to the top step of the podium two rounds later, ending an impressive debut supercross season with two wins. His motocross season in 2021 was curtailed by a dislocated shoulder sustained before the seventh round of the series. Thrasher was able to finish fifth in the final standings of the 250SX West class during the 2022 AMA Supercross Championship, which included a win at the final west coast-east coast showdown round. In addition to this, Thrasher completed the full 2022 AMA National Motocross Championship in the 250 class, finishing eighth in the final standings and picking up a fifth overall as his best round result.

For the 2023 AMA Supercross Championship season, Thrasher swapped to ride in the 250SX East class. He became a frequent feature in the battle for event wins and podiums, picking up three second places and his fourth professional supercross win in the Arlington 'triple crown' round. However, a crash at the Atlanta round ruled him out for the rest of the supercross season and the entire 2023 AMA National Motocross Championship. Thrasher moved back to the 250SX West class for the 2024 AMA Supercross Championship and after two difficult opening rounds, recorded his fifth professional supercross win in San Diego. A third place at the following round would be his only other podium finish of the supercross season on his way to fifth in the standings. Thrasher only competed in the opening two rounds of the 2024 AMA National Motocross Championship due to a broken collarbone.

Moving back to the 250SX East class for the 2025 AMA Supercross Championship, Thrasher was able to take his sixth professional supercross win at the round in Birmingham, Alabama, an event run in the triple crown format. He picked up a second podium at the penultimate round and ended the series fourth in the final standings. Thrasher had a tougher season in the 2025 AMA National Motocross Championship, finishing fourteenth in the final standings, with fifth overall at the final round being his best result. He bounced back in the three playoffs rounds of the 2025 SuperMotocross World Championship, landing on podium with third in St. Louis and finishing fourth in the final standings. Thrasher competed in the 250SX East class of the 2026 AMA Supercross Championship, experiencing a tough start to the season over the first five rounds. The second half of the season proved more fruitful, with a second place in Nashville followed up with a win at the triple crown event in Cleveland, resulting in fifth in the final standings. Thrasher struggled with consistency in the 2026 AMA National Motocross Championship, recording five top-ten overall finishes but also missing two rounds due to injury. After finishing eleventh in the outdoor standings, Thrasher ended the season with sixth in the standings of the 2026 SuperMotocross World Championship playoffs, which included a fourth overall at the finale.

== Honours ==
AMA Amateur National Motocross Championship

- 250B: 2020 (silver)
- Schoolboy 2 (12-17) B/C: 2020 (silver)
- Super Mini 1 (12-15): 2018 (gold)
- Super Mini 2 (13-16): 2018 (gold)
- Mini Sr 2 (12-14): 2017 (bronze)

== AMA Supercross/Motocross Results ==
Year	Rnd 1	Rnd 2	Rnd 3	Rnd 4	Rnd 5	Rnd 6	Rnd 7	Rnd 8	Rnd 9	Rnd 10	Rnd 11	Rnd 12	Rnd 13	Rnd 14	Rnd 15	Rnd 16	Rnd 17	Average Finish	Podium Percent	Place
2020 250 MX	OUT	OUT	OUT	OUT	OUT	OUT	OUT	13	11	-	-	-	-	-	-	-	-	12.00	-	24th
~2021 250 SX-W	-	-	-	-	-	-	-	11	20	10	9	9	1	4	1	-	OUT	6.88	25%	7th
2021 250 MX	17	12	OUT	13	16	OUT	OUT	OUT	OUT	OUT	OUT	OUT	-	-	-	-	-	14.50	-	22nd
2022 250 SX-W	12	5	8	4	7	DNF	-	-	-	-	-	11	-	5	-	9	1	6.89	11%	5th
2022 250 MX	13	13	16	10	10	9	12	9	9	6	5	9	-	-	-	-	-	10.08	-	8th
2023 250 SX-E	-	-	-	-	15	2	1	10	2	2	-	-	DNF	OUT	OUT	-	OUT	5.33	67%	7th
2023 250 MX	OUT	OUT	OUT	OUT	OUT	OUT	OUT	OUT	OUT	OUT	OUT	-	-	-	-	-	-	OUT	OUT	OUT
2024 250 SX-W	DNF	18	1	3	-	OUT	-	-	-	-	9	5	-	13	-	4	6	7.38	25%	5th
2024 250 MX	7	11	OUT	OUT	OUT	OUT	OUT	OUT	OUT	OUT	OUT	-	-	-	-	-	-	9.00	-	24th
2025 250 SX-E	-	-	-	-	8	5	-	8	14	1	-	11	14	5	2	-	13	8.10	20%	4th
2025 250 MX	DNF	22	19	9	14	11	19	18	11	9	5	-	-	-	-	-	-	12.45	-	14th
2026 250 SX-E	-	-	-	-	-	-	11 ARL (Texas)	7 DAY (Florida)	10 IND (Indiana)	10 BIR (Alabama)	21 DET (Michigan)	4 STL (Missouri)	2 NAS (Tennessee)	1 CLE (Ohio)	5 PHI (Pennsylvania)	-	18 SLC (Utah)	8.90	20%	5th
2026 250 MX	16 FOX (California)	17 HAN (California)	OUT THU (Colorado)	OUT HIG (Pennsylvania)	10 RED (Michigan)	7 SOU (Massachusetts)	11 SPR (Minnesota)	7 WAS (Washington (state))	9 UNA (New York (state))	20 BUD (Maryland)	9 IRN (Indiana)	-	-	-	-	-	-	10.67	-	9th
