= Justin Cooper (motorcyclist) =

American motorcycle racer

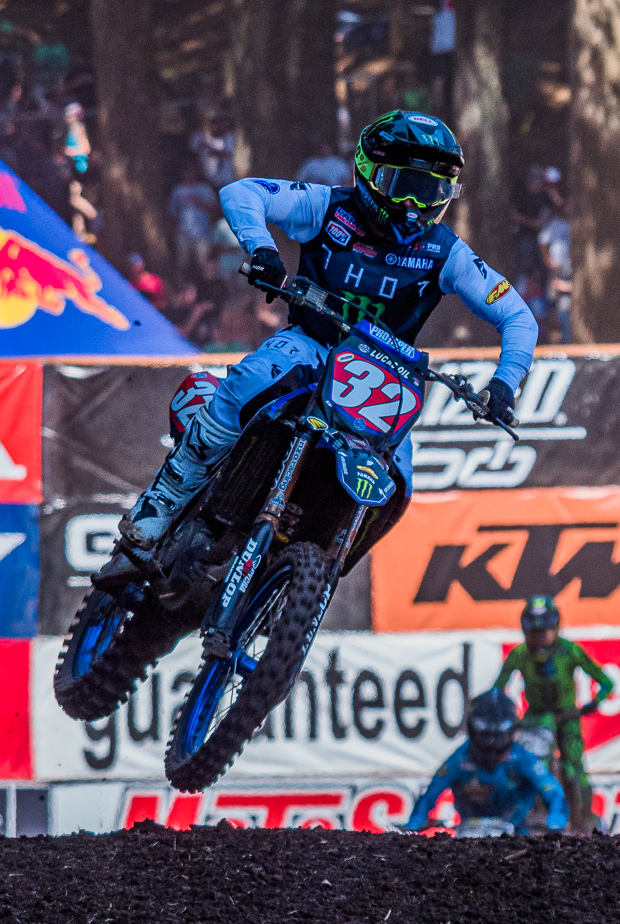
- Cooper in 2021
- Nationality: (United States) American
- Born: August 31, 1997 (age 29) Cold Spring Harbor, New York , USA

Motocross career
- Years active: 2017–Present
- Teams: •Monster Energy Yamaha Star Racing (2017-Present)
- Championships: •2021 AMA Supercross 250cc West
- Wins: •AMA 250cc Supercross: 4; •AMA 250cc Motocross: 4

Justin Cooper (born August 31, 1997) is an American professional motorcycle racer who competes in AMA Supercross and Motocross. He is the 2021 AMA Supercross 250cc West champion & was a member of the winning USA team at the 2022 Motocross Des Nations.

== Career ==
Justin Cooper began racing while growing up in Cold Spring Harbor, New York, where seasonal weather limited year-round training. Unlike many top amateur riders, he did not relocate for winter training and attended college briefly after high school. Cooper won four AMA Amateur National Motocross Championships at the Loretta Lynn’s Ranch. His 2017 titles in the Open Pro Sport and 250 A classes gained attention and led to his professional debut with CycleTrader.com/Rock River Yamaha at the final rounds of the 2017 Lucas Oil AMA Pro Motocross Championship.

In 2021, Cooper won the 250SX West Region championship in the Monster Energy Supercross series, while riding for Monster Energy Yamaha Star Racing. The same year, He also competed in the Lucas Oil Pro Motocross Championship 250 Class, finishing second overall behind Jett Lawrence.

In the 2025 Monster Energy AMA Supercross season, Cooper finished third overall in the 450SX class, accumulating 281 points over the 17-round series without securing a main event win. Cooper recorded multiple top-five finishes, including a second place in Indianapolis and a third place in the final round in Salt Lake City.

== AMA Supercross/Motocross results ==
Year	Rnd 1	Rnd 2	Rnd 3	Rnd 4	Rnd 5	Rnd 6	Rnd 7	Rnd 8	Rnd 9	Rnd 10	Rnd 11	Rnd 12	Rnd 13	Rnd 14	Rnd 15	Rnd 16	Rnd 17	Average Finish	Podium Percent	Place
2017 250 MX	OUT	OUT	OUT	OUT	OUT	OUT	OUT	OUT	OUT	5	11	11	-	-	-	-	-	9.00	-	21st
2018 250 SX-W	9	OUT	OUT	OUT	OUT	OUT	-	-	-	-	-	OUT	OUT	-	-	OUT	OUT	9.00	-	26th
2018 250 MX	5	6	3	3	10	15	5	2	7	8	7	5	-	-	-	-	-	6.33	25%	3rd
2019 250 SX-E	-	-	-	-	-	3	2	4	5	3	3	-	-	3	-	3	8	3.78	67%	2nd
2019 250 MX	2	2	2	9	1	3	3	7	3	4	3	2	-	-	-	-	-	3.41	75%	3rd
2020 250 SX-W	1	2	2	9	3	3	-	-	-	-	-	-	-	4	6	-	7	4.11	56%	2nd
2020 250 MX	8	11	4	9	7	5	2	1	12	-	-	-	-	-	-	-	-	6.56	22%	5th
~2021 250 SX-W	-	-	-	-	-	-	-	1	4	4	5	1	2	1	2	-	9	3.22	55%	1st
2021 250 MX	3	1	3	2	3	3	3	2	3	3	3	1	-	-	-	-	-	2.50	100%	2nd
2022 250 MX	12	2	4	5	7	3	4	2	2	5	6	3	-	-	-	-	-	4.58	42%	4th
2023 450 SX	OUT	OUT	OUT	7	7	10	9	6	OUT	OUT	OUT	OUT	OUT	OUT	OUT	OUT	OUT	7.80	0%	22nd
2023 250 MX	5	2	2	OUT	3	2	2	2	3	2	4	-	-	-	-	-	-	2.70	80%	2nd
2024 450 SX	8	DNQ	14	8	9	11	7	6	5	10	8	9	8	6	10	6	2	7.81	6%	6th
2024 450 MX	6	4	3	5	4	5	3	5	6	10	5	-	-	-	-	-	-	5.09	18%	4th
2025 450 SX	7	11	6	13	4	5	4	4	2	6	6	11	6	4	3	3	3	5.76	24%	3rd
2025 450 MX	5	3	4	5	4	3	10	6	4	5	3	-	-	-	-	-	-	4.73	27%	4th
2026 450 SX	6 ANA (California)	6 SDI (California)	10 ANA (California)	9 HOU (Texas)	4 GLE (Arizona)	3 SEA (Washington (state))	5 ARL (Texas)	12 DAY (Florida)	4 IND (Indiana)	4 BIR (Alabama)	4 DET (Michigan)	2 STL (Missouri)	7 NAS (Tennessee)	3 CLE (Ohio)	13 PHI (Pennsylvania)	13 DEN (Colorado)	2 SLC (Utah)	6.29	24%	5th
2026 450 MX	4 FOX (California)	13 HAN (California)	OUT THU (Colorado)	OUT HIG (Pennsylvania)	OUT RED (Michigan)	OUT SOU (Massachusetts)	OUT SPR (Minnesota)	OUT WAS (Washington (state))	9 UNA (New York (state))	OUT BUD (Maryland)	OUT IRN (Indiana)	-	-	-	-	-	-	8.67	-	19th

== SMX Results ==
Year	Rnd 1	Rnd 2	Rnd 3	Average Finish	Podium Percent	Place
2023 250 SMX	9 CON (North Carolina)	12 CHI (Illinois)	4 LAC (California)	8.33	-	6th
2024 450 SMX	6 CON (North Carolina)	23 FOR (Texas)	6 LVE (Nevada)	11.67	-	8th
2025 450 SMX	11 CON (North Carolina)	8 STL (Missouri)	5 LVE (Nevada)	8.00	-	5th
2026 450 SMX	OUT COL (Ohio)	OUT LOS (California)	OUT RID (Missouri)	-	-	-
