= Jason Anderson (motorcyclist) =

American motorcycle racer (born 1993)

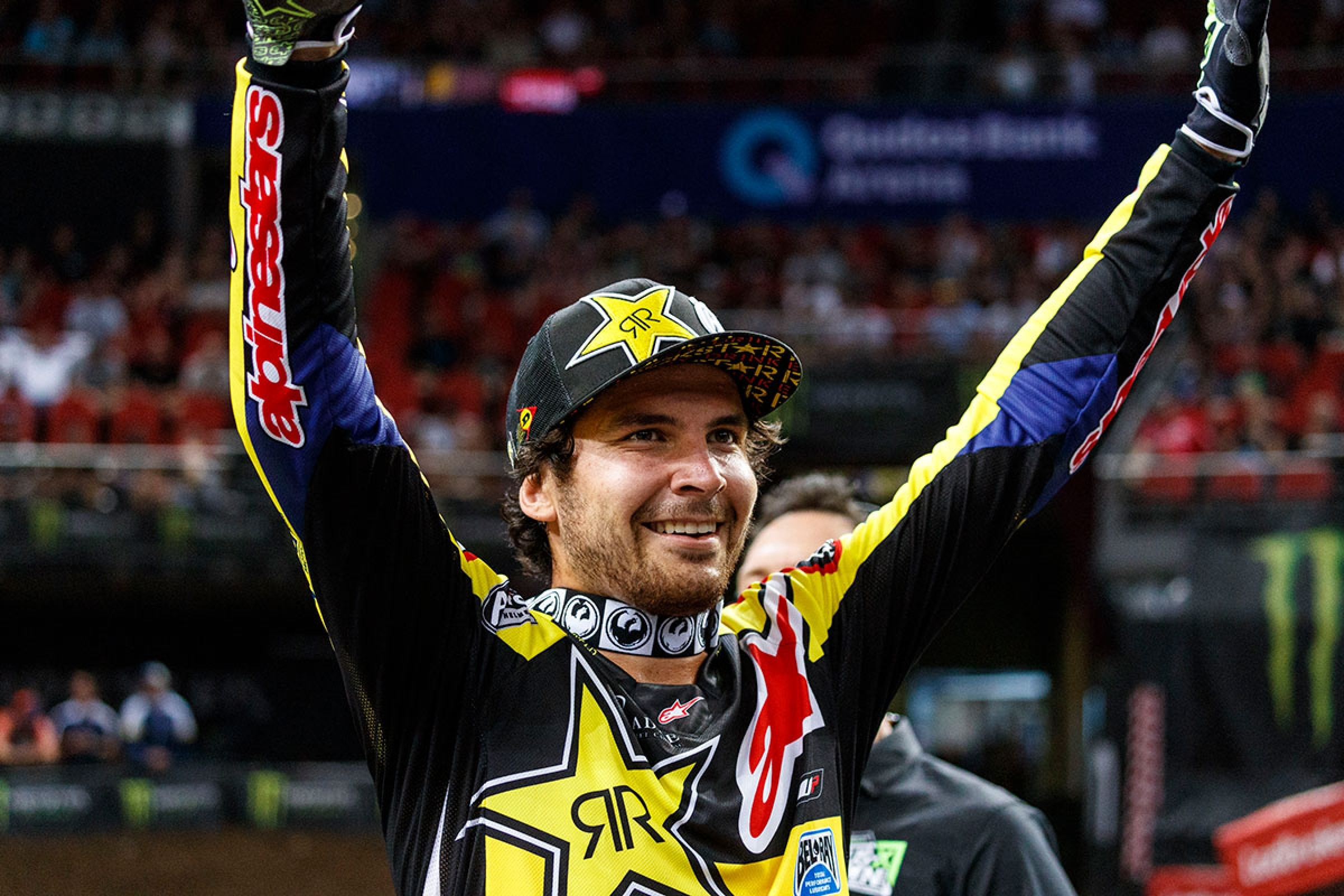
- Nationality: American
- Born: February 17, 1993 (age 33) Edgewood, New Mexico

Motocross career
- Years active: 2011–present
- Teams: •Rockstar Energy Factory Racing Husqvarna (2014-2021); •Monster Energy Kawasaki (2021-2025); •HEP Suzuki (2025-Present)
- Championships: •2014 AMA Supercross 250cc West; •2018 AMA Supercross 450cc; •2025 FIM World Supercross 450cc
- Wins: •AMA 250cc Supercross: 5; •AMA 450cc Supercross: 14; •AMA 450cc Motocross: 2

Jason Anderson (born February 17, 1993) is an American professional Motocross and Supercross racer. He has competed in the AMA Motocross and Supercross championships since 2011. Nicknamed "El Hombre", he is the 2018 450cc AMA Supercross Champion, the 21st winner of the Supercross title.

Anderson competed for Rockstar Energy for most of his professional racing career, racing on Suzuki, KTM, and finally Husqvarna bikes. He signed with Monster Energy Kawasaki in October of 2021.

Anderson trained with Supercross Champion Ryan Dungey for three seasons as well as Marvin Musquin, Cooper Webb, Adam Cianciarulo and Zach Osborne under the stewardship of professional motocross trainer Aldon Baker.

== Personal life ==
Jason Anderson grew up in New Mexico, the son of Mike and Darla Anderson. He raced dirt bikes from a young age and was accompanied to races by his grandparents. He turned pro in 2011, and moved to Florida to train under Aldon Baker in 2014. In 2020, he left the Baker's factory and moved to California.

As of 2022, Anderson moved back to his home state of New Mexico and trains at his personal track there and in California.

== Season results ==
=== Amateur ===
Anderson started riding at the age of seven. He has 72 amateur wins and 5 Loretta Lynn's Amateur Championships. He was the 2010 Nicky Hayden Award (as it has been called since 2017) winner for motocross and 450A Class champion at Loretta Lynn's.

=== 2011 season ===
Anderson struggled in his pro 250 rookie season for Rockstar Suzuki. Admittedly not having the fitness required. He raced the east coast with his best finish a sixth.

Anderson's motocross season was also rough, with his best finish an eighth.

=== 2012 season ===
Anderson had another tough supercross season, but managed to achieve his first podium, a second place, at the Salt Lake City race.

Anderson showed some improvement in his motocross season, placing consistently in the sixth-13th range.

=== 2013 season ===
Anderson again raced the west coast, and showed promise in his supercross season with two podiums and his first pro win, again in Salt Lake City.

Anderson stayed mostly in the top-ten in motocross, until the end of the season, but managed to come away with his first podium, a third at Spring Creek.

=== 2014 season ===
In Anderson's fourth year in the 250 class, he began training with Aldon Baker and the Rockstar team switched to KTM bikes. For this season, Anderson raced with the number 17.

Anderson came out firing as he won the opener in Anaheim. He and Cole Seely battled for the championship in the 250 SX-West. Anderson persevered throughout the season, often stealing victories on the final lap, and locked down the championship in his final year in the 250cc class with 4 wins and 3 podiums.

Anderson struggled with small injuries and illness during his motocross season, but stayed mostly in the top-ten, with three podiums.

After the outdoor season, Anderson's team switched bikes to Husqvarna. He raced in the Monster Energy Cup on a 450, placing seventh.

=== 2015 season ===
Anderson went back to the number 21 this year, and instead of defending his 250 supercross title, moved into the 450 class. He came out strong in his rookie season with a second in Anaheim. He stayed mostly within the top-ten, finishing seventh overall in supercross standings with two podiums.

Anderson had a good 450 rookie motocross season, finishing sixth overall with four podiums.

Anderson placed third in the Monster Energy Cup.

=== 2016 season ===
Anderson was very consistent in his sophomore 450 supercross season, rarely placing outside the top-five. He finished third overall, winning both the season opener in Anaheim, in a strong come from behind victory, and the 11th round in Detroit. He made the podium five times.

Anderson had a decent motocross season started, making the podium once; but after five races, a broken collarbone ended his season.

After healing up, Anderson was chosen as a member of Team USA, along with Cooper Webb and Alex Martin, for the 2016 Motocross des Nations in Maggiora, Italy. During a practice crash, he fractured his foot, but decided to race. After a battle with Jeffrey Herlings, he won the second race, putting team USA into the lead for the title. However, while celebrating his victory, Anderson rolled the finish line jump and was then landed on by a lapped rider. He was knocked unconscious and broke a shoulder blade, making him unable to compete in the third moto. France took the team win. and USA finished third.

=== 2017 season ===
Anderson had a solid supercross season, consistently in the top-five with six podiums. He finished with a win at the last race in Las Vegas, securing him fourth overall in the season.

During the outdoor Motocross championship, Anderson came out swinging with a streak of five consecutive podiums before crashes sidelined him for several races. He then had surgery to remove a plate from his foot, which kept him out for the remainder of the season.

Anderson did well in the Monster Energy Cup, but finished second, behind Marvin Musquin.

=== 2018 season ===
During the 2018 Supercross championship, Anderson came out strong with a second at Anaheim 1, then won in Houston, gaining the red plate. His points lead eventually grew to 41, aided by injuries sustained by main title contenders Eli Tomac, Marvin Musquin, and Ken Roczen. He then took firsts in Oakland, San Diego, and Atlanta, podiumed 11 times, and was fourth or better in 14 of the 17 season races. His once-comfortable lead was drastically cut short during round 16 in Salt Lake City due to a crash which broke several spokes on his front wheel. After a pit stop for a new wheel, he was only able to get up to 17th. With the points lead reduced to 14, the championship was decided at the closing round in Las Vegas' Sam Boyd Stadium. Anderson placed fifth, winning the championship nine points over Marvin Musquin.

Anderson raced four rounds of motocross and had one podium, though practice injuries removed him from most of the season.

Anderson again placed second in the Monster Energy Cup.

In the off-season, Anderson raced in the Australian Supercross Open in Sydney, taking first.

=== 2019 season ===
Anderson only raced three rounds of supercross, gaining one podium, before he broke his arm in two places and suffered a broken rib in a practice crash. He sat out the rest of the supercross season.

Anderson was able to complete a full motocross season, staying mostly in the top-five and gaining four podiums in a strong showing. He placed fourth overall.

Anderson was chosen again for the team USA for MXoN in Assen, along with Zach Osborne and Justin Cooper. He went to Europe a month early with his team and Team Fried friends to train. After challenging weather and track conditions, including Justin Cooper going down and taking Anderson with him, Team USA finished sixth.

In his off season, Anderson again competed in the Australian Supercross open in Melbourne and Auckland taking a first and second. Soon after, he competed in the Paris supercross, taking a first, second, and first, and was crowned the King of Paris.

=== 2020 season ===
Anderson had a decent supercross season, staying mostly in the top-five. He placed fourth overall after the Covid-forced residency in Salt Lake City. During this time, he announced he was parting ways with long-time trainer Aldon Baker, saying he needed a change of pace in training.

Anderson competed in three rounds of motocross, with one podium, before having severe pain in his arm caused by a surgical plate from breaking his arm previously. After having surgery to remove the plate, he was out for the remainder of the season.

=== 2021 season ===
Anderson had a tough supercross season, finishing eighth with two podiums.

Anderson only completed one motocross race before breaking his hand in practice accident which ended his season.

In the fall, Anderson announced he had signed with the Monster Energy Kawasaki team, which is the manufacturer he raced for during his amateur career.

=== 2022 Season ===
Anderson began the year on a Kawasaki with his new team. He started his supercross season with a tenth place finish in Anaheim, but won the next race in Oakland, ending a 47 race winless streak. He then picked up wins in Anaheim (Round 6), Minneapolis (Round 7), Atlanta (Round 14), Foxborough (Round 15), Denver (Round 16). and Salt Lake City (round 17). Anderson ended the supercross season with seven wins, doubling his previous number of wins, and putting him on the all-time supercross win list at 18th with 14 wins. Anderson was involved in many on track incidents which cost him points, however, at the closest, he was only three points away from Champion, Eli Tomac. Anderson finished a close 2nd overall.

Anderson started his motocross season out strong, gaining his first ever outdoor overall win at Hangtown. After a solid string of podium finishes behind front runners Eli Tomac and Chase Sexton, he pulled out another overall win at Budds Creek. He was able to complete his outdoor season without injury and ended up third overall in his best motocross season.

=== 2023 Season ===
Anderson struggled in his 2023 Supercross season. Coming in, he was considered a main favorite alongside 2x champions Eli Tomac and Cooper Webb, and the fast Chase Sexton. He started the season with a hard crash and several on track incidents that put him on probation by the AMA. After a couple of mid-season podium finishes, he generally placed around sixth. In Atlanta, he charged hard in his heart race to take the win, but DNF'd the main event as a result of no sleep from the birth of his daughter the day before. In Nashville, he crashed hard in practice and went down again in his heat. He raced the main event but later in the week had tests done that concluded he had sustained a non-displaced fracture of the c5-c6 vertebrae. He sat out the last two rounds of the season & finished sixth for the season.

Anderson entered the Motocross season at the fifth round at Red Bud. He spent the first couple of races returning to form, but worked hard and was able to finish twice on the podium. He finished ninth overall.

For the inaugural Supermotocross World Championship, Anderson was seeded seventh. He raced to a fifth overall finish in Charlotte, ninth overall in Joliet (After a first turn crash in the first moto), and 11th overall in Los Angeles (With a DNF following a crash in the second moto that banged up his bike and crushed a finger). He finished eighth overall in the championship.

=== 2024 Season ===
Anderson started out the supercross season strong with a second place in Anaheim. He struggled with the many mud races of the year but managed to rebound at the end of the season. He achieved four podium finishes and ended fifth in final standings (tied in points with Eli Tomac but without a win).

Anderson managed to complete the full motocross season. He raced solidly in the top-ten, with one podium, and finished fifth overall. With managing to race well and complete both supercross and motocross seasons, he was seeded third in the Supermotocross standings.

During press day at the first round of Supermotocross at Charlotte, Anderson crashed twice. He injured his lower back and did not compete in the main event. He returned for the second round in Dallas and finished eighth. In Las Vegas, he had good starts but crashes set him back in the first moto and caused him to DNF the second moto. He ended up 13th overall and tenth in the SMX Championship.

=== 2025 Season ===
Anderson had a strong off-season and started Supercross out well with three podiums in five races. However, after a mid season slump, he pulled out of the rest of the season before Seattle, citing a family emergency and then lingering health issues.

== AMA Supercross/Motocross results ==
Year	Rnd 1	Rnd 2	Rnd 3	Rnd 4	Rnd 5	Rnd 6	Rnd 7	Rnd 8	Rnd 9	Rnd 10	Rnd 11	Rnd 12	Rnd 13	Rnd 14	Rnd 15	Rnd 16	Rnd 17	Average Finish	Podium Percent	Place
2014 SX-W	1	1	4	1	5	2	-	-	-	-	-	-	-	1	2	-	6	2.56	67%	1st
2016 450 SX	1	5	5	4	4	4	3	7	4	9	1	3	3	3	4	6	2	4.00	42%	3rd
2016 450 MX	4	4	DNF	2	OUT	OUT	OUT	OUT	OUT	OUT	OUT	5	-	-	-	-	-	3.75	25%	14th
2017 450 SX	4	4	OUT	10	4	3	4	4	19	3	9	6	4	3	3	3	1	5.87	38%	4th
2017 450 MX	13	2	3	2	2	2	OUT	DNF	OUT	OUT	OUT	OUT	-	-	-	-	-	4.00	83%	11th
2018 450 SX	2	1	3	4	1	1	4	3	1	7	2	4	2	2	3	17	5	3.64	65%	1st
2018 450 MX	4	3	OUT	OUT	OUT	OUT	OUT	OUT	OUT	OUT	12	24	-	-	-	-	-	11.00	25%	17th
2019 450 SX	14	2	9	OUT	OUT	OUT	OUT	OUT	OUT	OUT	OUT	OUT	OUT	OUT	OUT	OUT	OUT	8.33	33%	23rd
2019 450 MX	3	5	4	3	4	5	2	11	5	5	2	6	-	-	-	-	-	4.58	33%	4th
2020 450 SX	5	3	5	3	5	14	10	3	11	4	4	4	3	7	DNF	5	2	5.50	31%	4th
2020 450 MX	2	9	DNQ	OUT	OUT	OUT	OUT	OUT	OUT	-	-	-	-	-	-	-	-	5.50	50%	19th
2021 450 SX	15	8	8	7	OUT	6	8	5	7	3	7	5	4	3	14	7	DNF	7.13	13%	8th
2021 450 MX	6	OUT	OUT	OUT	OUT	OUT	OUT	OUT	OUT	OUT	OUT	OUT	-	-	-	-	-	6.00	-	28th
2022 450 SX	10	1	8	2	4	1	1	2	9	21	6	2	4	1	1	1	1	4.41	59%	2nd
2022 450 MX	6	1	4	3	4	8	3	3	3	1	4	3	-	-	-	-	-	3.58	58%	3rd
2023 450 SX	7	5	7	2	3	6	4	5	5	9	4	10	21	12	6	OUT	OUT	7.06	13%	6th
2023 450 MX	OUT	OUT	OUT	OUT	5	10	10	3	8	3	4	-	-	-	-	-	-	6.13	29%	9th
2024 450 SX	2	12	5	4	5	2	10	9	6	4	10	11	4	4	3	3	4	5.76	24%	5th
2024 450 MX	7	5	7	6	12	4	5	3	5	5	5	-	-	-	-	-	-	5.82	9%	5th
2025 450 SX	3	13	3	7	3	6	11	8	11	7	OUT	OUT	OUT	OUT	OUT	OUT	OUT	7.20	30%	12th
2025 450 MX	7	8	19	7	DNF	15	OUT	OUT	OUT	OUT	OUT	-	-	-	-	-	-	11.20	-	19th
2026 450 SX	5	11	4	6	11	12	21													

== SMX Results ==
Year	Rnd 1	Rnd 2	Rnd 3	Average Finish	Podium Percent	Place
2023 450 SMX	5 CON	9 CHI	11 LAC	8.33	-	8th
2024 450 SMX	OUT CON	8 FOR	13 LVE	10.50	-	10th
2025 450 SMX	OUT CON	OUT STL	OUT LVE	-	-	-
2026 450 SMX	12 COL	OUT LOS	OUT RID	12.00	-	26th
