= Hunter Lawrence (motorcyclist) =

Australian motorcycle racer

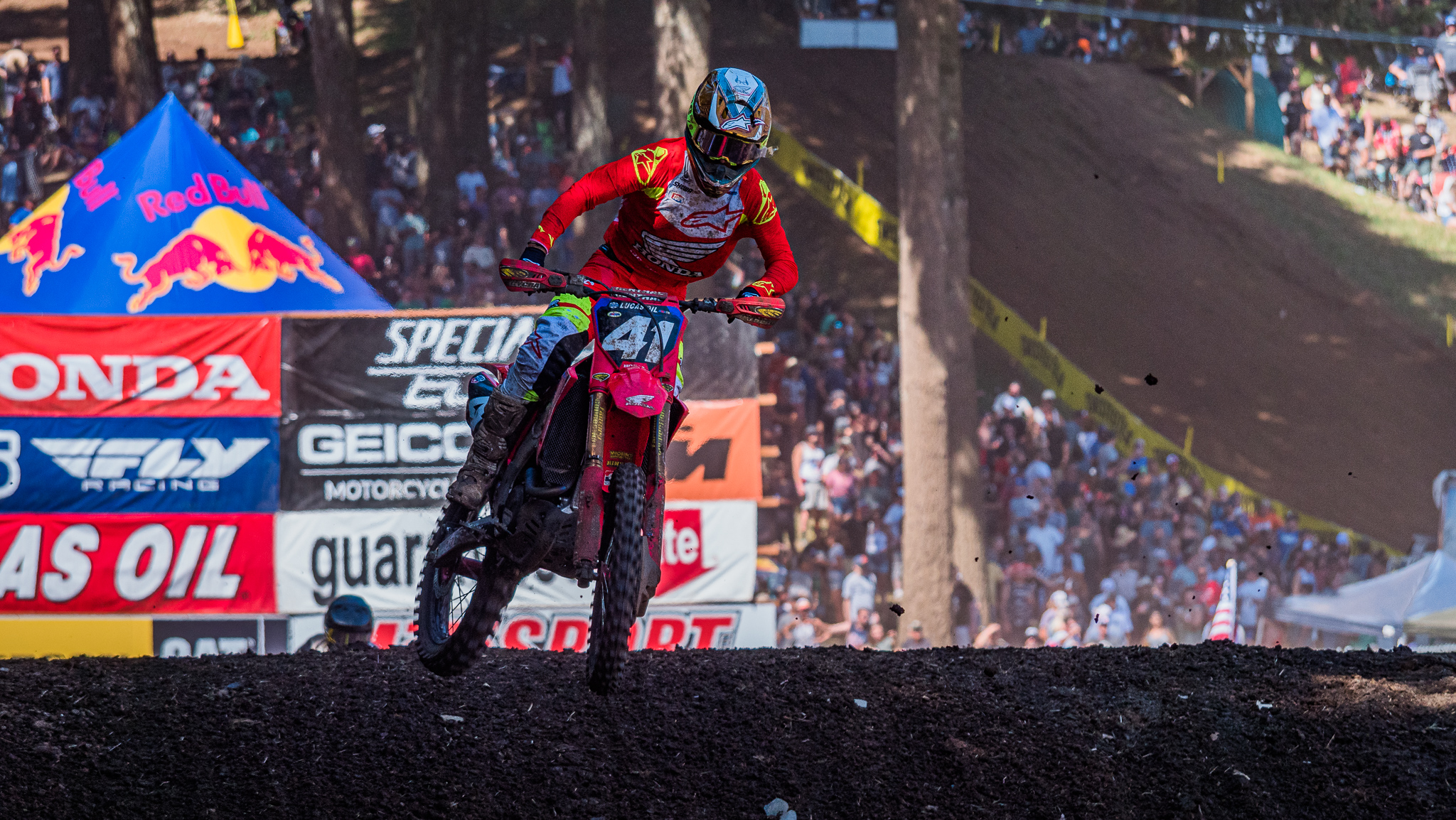
- Hunter in 2021
- Nationality: Australian
- Born: 1 August 1999 (age 27) Maleny, Queensland, Australia

Motocross career
- Years active: 2016-present
- Teams: •Team Suzuki World MX2 (2016-2017); •Honda 114 Motorsports (2018); •Geico Honda (2018-2020); •HRC Honda (2020–present)
- Championships: •2023 AMA Supercross 250cc East; •2023 AMA Motocross 250cc; •2026 AMA Motocross 450cc
- Wins: •250cc AMA Supercross: 12; •250cc AMA Motocross: 8; •450cc AMA Supercross: 5; •450cc AMA Motocross: 7; •AMA Total: 32

Hunter Lawrence (born 1 August 1999) is an Australian professional motocross rider that’s competed in the AMA Supercross and Motocross championships since 2019. He is the 2026 AMA Motocross 450cc champion, an AMA Supercross 250cc East & 250cc AMA Motocross Champion.He was a member of the winning Australia team at the 2024 & 2025 Motocross des Nations.

== 450cc Career ==
=== 2023 ===
On 30 October, it was announced that Hunter would move up to the 450 class for 2024 & beyond.

=== 2024 ===
Supercross

Lawrence failed to qualify for round 1 of the 2024 AMA Supercross Championship, narrowly missing out after a first turn crash in 450 heat 1, and a poor start in the LCQ. From this, Lawrence would begin to build momentum, securing multiple top-ten & top-five finishes, until a crash at round 8, Daytona. Lawrence returned at round 10, & began slowly building momentum. He ended the supercross season with two podium finishes & a ninth in the championship for his rookie year.

Motocross

In his 450cc class rookie season, Lawrence battled for the Championship. He scored multiple podium finishes as well as moto wins, but was unable to win an overall. He held the points lead from round 3 to 6 and showcased consistency all season. Hunter ended the Championship second, scored nine podiums, three race wins, with 42 points the difference in his debut season.

=== 2025 ===
The 2025 season for Hunter Lawrence was his second full year in the premier 450 class in the United States.

Lawrence entered the 450SX championship as a contender following his successful transition to the premier class in previous seasons. However, his Supercross campaign was disrupted by injuries and missed rounds. He competed in only a limited number of races during the season and recorded several top-ten finishes before withdrawing from the championship. Due to the missed events, he finished 21st in the final standings of the AMA Supercross Championship.

Lawrence returned to full fitness for the outdoor season and was a consistent front-runner throughout the AMA Pro Motocross Championship. Riding the Honda CRF450R, he recorded numerous podium finishes and secured his first overall victory in the 450 class at the Ironman National, without winning a moto. Lawrence finished second in the final championship standings, behind his brother Jett Lawrence, marking his best result in the 450 outdoor championship to date.

Lawrence carried his outdoor form into the SuperMotocross World Championship playoffs. During the three-round postseason, he achieved afourth place in the opening playoff round, and a victory in the second playoff round. He finished second overall in the championship final. His results earned him second place in the SMX World Championship standings, again finishing behind Jett Lawrence after the three-race playoff series.

Lawrence represented Australia at the Motocross of Nations, alongside Jett Lawrence and Kyle Webster. Competing in the Open class, Lawrence contributed to Australia’s overall victory with 1-1 race scores, securing the Chamberlain Trophy for the team.

== 250cc career ==
=== 2023 ===
Supercross

Throughout the 2023 East coast Supercross Championship, Lawrence won seven races; including wins at Houston, Tampa, Daytona, Indianapolis, Detroit, Atlanta and Nashville. At round 15 in Nashville, Hunter clinched the 2023 250cc East Supercross championship with a first-place finish. Ending the season a week later, 58 points clear whilst becoming the first brothers with Jett Lawrence, to win the 250SX titles in the same

Motocross

Coming in with limited preparation due to a rib injury and after facing mid season mechanical issues, Lawrence won seven rounds and seven individual motos on his way to the 2023 AMA Motocross 250cc Championship.

== MX2 career ==
=== 2017 ===
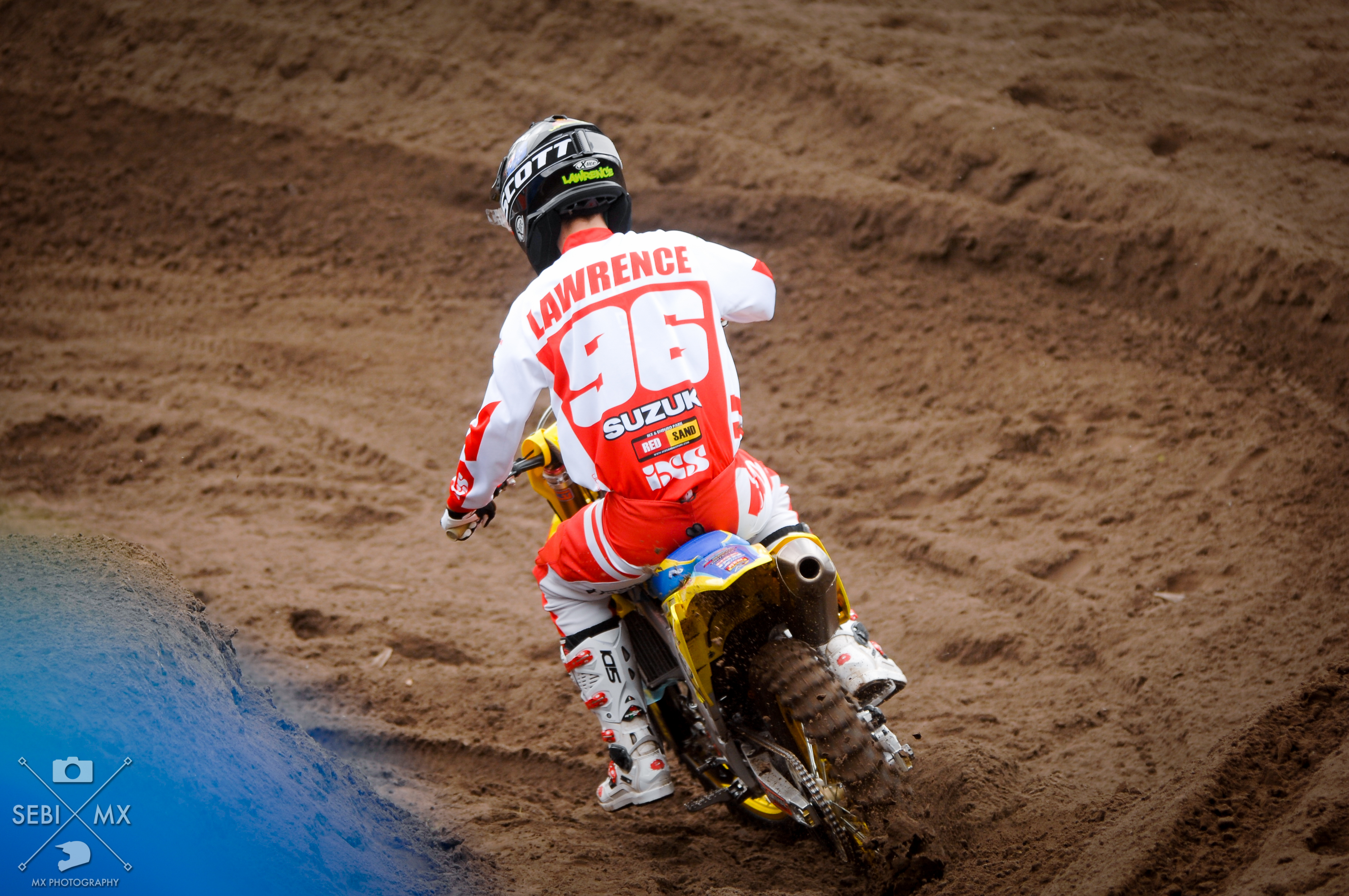
Hunter in 2017

In 2017, Lawrence participated in the MX2 class, riding for the Suzuki World MX2 team. He finished ninth in the Championship, collected three podiums and took a race win at the MXGP of France, Pays de Montbéliard, in challenging mud conditions.

=== 2018 ===
In the 2018 MX2 season, Lawrence competed for the Honda 114 Motorsports team, where he once again finished ninth in the MX2 Championship with three podiums. He suffered a fractured/broken middle metacarpal in his right hand during timed practice at the MXGP of Trentino in April, which resulted in him competing in 13 of the 20 rounds.

== AMA Supercross/Motocross results ==
Year	Rnd 1	Rnd 2	Rnd 3	Rnd 4	Rnd 5	Rnd 6	Rnd 7	Rnd 8	Rnd 9	Rnd 10	Rnd 11	Rnd 12	Rnd 13	Rnd 14	Rnd 15	Rnd 16	Rnd 17	Average Finish	Podium Percent	Place
2019 250 MX	11 HAN	9 FOX	8 THU	2 HIG	5 WWR	11 SOU	5 RED	3 SPR	OUT WAS	OUT UNA	12 BUD	OUT IRN	-	-	-	-	-	7.33	22%	10th
2020 250 SX-W	OUT ANA	OUT STL	OUT ANA	OUT GLE	OUT OAK	OUT SDI	-	-	-	-	-	-	-	13 SLC	7 SLC	-	OUT SLC	10.00	-	24th
2020 250 MX	17 LLS	DNF LLS	16 IRN	12 RED	18 RED	7 SPR	14 WWR	5 THU	OUT FOX	-	-	-	-	-	-	-	-	12.77	-	13th
`2021 250 SX-W	-	-	-	-	-	-	-	5 ORL	6 DAY	2 ARL	1 ARL	5 ARL	7 HAM	2 HAM	4 HAM	-	3 SLC	3.88	44%	2nd
2021 250 MX	6 FOX	3 THU	8 HIG	4 RED	1 SOU	5 SPR	7 WAS	6 UNA	4 BUD	9 IRN	5 FOX	6 HAN	-	-	-	-	-	5.33	17%	3rd
2022 250 SX-W	3 ANA	2 OAK	2 SDI	3 ANA	1 GLE	18 ANA	-	-	-	-	-	1 SEA	-	1 HAM	-	1 DEN	2 SLC	3.44	90%	2nd
2022 250 MX	2 FOX	3 HAN	2 THU	2 HIG	2 RED	7 SOU	3 SPR	3 WAS	3 UNA	8 BUD	3 IRN	4 FOX	-	-	-	-	-	3.50	75%	3rd
2023 250 SX-E	-	-	-	-	1 HOU	1 TAM	3 ARL	1 DAY	1 IND	1 DET	-	-	1 HAM	3 EAR	1 NAS	-	6 SLC	1.90	90%	1st
2023 250 MX	1 FOX	1 HAN	1 THU	1 HIG	9 RED	13 SOU	1 SPR	3 WAS	1 UNA	1 BUD	5 IRN	-	-	-	-	-	-	3.36	73%	1st
2024 450 SX	DNQ ANA	10 SFR	7 SDI	11 ANA	8 DET	5 GLE	5 ARL	DNF DAY	OUT BIR	11 IND	7 SEA	3 STL	7 FOX	7 NAS	7 PHI	2 DEN	15 SLC	7.50	14%	9th
2024 450 MX	2 FOX	2 HAN	2 THU	3 HIG	3 SOU	3 RED	2 SPR	4 WAS	2 UNA	2 BUD	4 IRN	-	-	-	-	-	-	2.73	82%	2nd
2025 450 SX	11 ANA	5 SDI	5 ANA	5 GLE}	DNQ TAM	OUT DET	OUT ARL	OUT DAY	OUT IND	OUT BIR	OUT SEA	OUT FOX	OUT PHI	OUT EAR	OUT PIT	OUT DEN	OUT SLC	6.50	-	21st
2025 450 MX	3 FOX	5 HAN	5 THU	2 HIG	2 SOU	2 RED	2 SPR	4 WAS	1 IRN	2 UNA	2 BUD	-	-	-	-	-	-	2.73	73%	2nd
2026 450 SX	4 ANA	2 SDI	2 ANA	2 HOU	2 GLE	4 SEA	1 ARL	2 DAY	1 IND	1 BIR	18 DET	3 STL	1 NAS	6 CLE	3 PHI	1 DEN	7 SLC	3.52	71%	2nd
2026 450 MX	1 FOX	2 HAN	3 THU	1 HIG	1 RED	2 SOU	1 SPR	1 WAS	8 UNA	1 BUD	4 IRN	-	-	-	-	-	-	2.27	82%	1st

== SMX Results ==
Year	Rnd 1	Rnd 2	Rnd 3	Average Finish	Podium Percent	Place
2023 250 SMX	8 CON	1 CHI	OUT LAC	4.50	50%	9th
2024 450 SMX	4 CON	1 FOR	2 LVE	2.33	66%	2nd
2025 450 SMX	4 CON	1 STL	2 LVE	2.33	66%	2nd
2026 450 SMX	15 COL	2 LOS	3 RID	6.67	66%	3rd
