= 2026 FIM Supercross World Championship =

2026 Supercross World Championship season

The 2026 FIM Supercross World Championship was a supercross series sanctioned by the Fédération Internationale de Motocyclisme (FIM) as the world championship of the sport, that was cancelled after a single round. This was the fifth season organized by Australian promoter SX Global.

Jason Anderson was the reigning champion in the SX1 class for 450cc motorcycles, after picking up his first title in the series in 2025. Max Anstie was the reigning champion in the SX2 class, after picking up his second title in the previous season.

The series was scheduled to expand to six events for the 2026 season. However, after the first round in Canada, the rest of the series would ultimately be cancelled due to financial problems for the series promoters.

Brazilian team 595 Racing joined the series as a new Licensed Team.

== Calendar and results ==
The 2026 season was scheduled to have 6 events on 5 different continents.

Round	Date	Grand Prix	Location	Stadium	SX1 Winner	SX2 Winner
1	8 August	(Canada) Canadian Grand Prix	Calgary	McMahon Stadium	(United States) Cooper Webb	(United Kingdom) Max Anstie
~~2~~	~~10 October~~	~~(United Kingdom) British Grand Prix~~	~~Birmingham~~	~~Alexander Stadium~~	Event Cancelled	
~~3~~	~~24 October~~	~~(Argentina) Buenos Aires City Grand Prix~~	~~Buenos Aires~~	~~Autódromo Oscar y Juan Gálvez~~	Event Cancelled	
~~4~~	~~21 November~~	~~(Australia) Australian Grand Prix~~	~~Gold Coast~~	~~Cbus Super Stadium~~	Event Cancelled	
~~5~~	~~TBA~~	~~(South Africa) South African Grand Prix~~	~~TBA~~	~~TBA~~	Event Cancelled	
~~6~~	~~5 December~~	~~New Zealand Grand Prix~~	~~Christchurch~~	~~One New Zealand Stadium~~	Event Cancelled	

== SX1 ==
=== Entry list ===
Licensed Teams & Riders
Team	Constructor	No	Rider	Rounds
(United States) Rocket Doctor/Rick Ware Racing	Yamaha	2	(United States) Cooper Webb	1
(United States) Rocket Doctor/Rick Ware Racing	KTM	46	(United States) Justin Hill	1
(France) Team Venum Bud Racing Kawasaki	Kawasaki	4	(Australia) Luke Clout	1
(France) Team Venum Bud Racing Kawasaki	Kawasaki	41	(United States) Mitchell Harrison	1
(Australia) Quad Lock Honda Konsky Motorsport Group	Honda	15	(United Kingdom) Dean Wilson	1
(Australia) Quad Lock Honda Konsky Motorsport Group	Honda	17	(United States) Joey Savatgy	
(Australia) Quad Lock Honda Konsky Motorsport Group	Honda	28	(United States) Christian Craig	1
(United States) MCR Honda	Honda	16	(Brazil) Enzo Lopes	
(United States) MCR Honda	Honda	98	(United States) Austin Politelli	1
(United States) MCR Honda	Honda	800	(United States) Mike Alessi	1
(Brazil) 595 Racing	KTM	20	(France) Greg Aranda	1
(Brazil) 595 Racing	KTM	78	(United States) Kevin Moranz	1
(United States) Twisted Tea PMG Suzuki	Suzuki	21	(United States) Jason Anderson	1
(United States) Twisted Tea PMG Suzuki	Suzuki	45	(United States) Colt Nichols	1
(Spain) Stark	Stark	99	(Spain) Jorge Zaragoza	1
(Spain) Stark	Stark	719	(United States) Vince Friese	1
(France) Team GSM	Yamaha	141	(France) Maxime Desprey	1
(France) Team GSM	Yamaha	911	(France) Jordi Tixier	1
Wildcard Teams & Riders

==== Riders Championship ====
Points are awarded to the top-ten finishers of the first two races, in the following format:

Position	1st	2nd	3rd	4th	5th	6th	7th	8th	9th	10th
Points	10	9	8	7	6	5	4	3	2	1

Points are awarded to the top-twenty finishers of the third race, in the following format:

Position	1st	2nd	3rd	4th	5th	6th	7th	8th	9th	10th	11th	12th	13th	14th	15th	16th	17th	18th	19th	20th
Points	25	22	20	18	16	15	14	13	12	11	10	9	8	7	6	5	4	3	2	1

Pos	Nr	Rider	Bike	CAN (Canada)			GBR (United Kingdom)	ARG (Argentina)	AUS (Australia)	TBA (South Africa)	NZL (New Zealand)	Points
1	2	(United States) Cooper Webb	Yamaha	2	1	1						19
2	15	(United Kingdom) Dean Wilson	Honda	3	3	2						16
3	46	(United States) Justin Hill	KTM	1	5	4						16
4	719	(United States) Vince Friese	Stark	6	4	6						12
5	41	(United States) Mitchell Harrison	Kawasaki	4	6	8						12
6	99	(Spain) Jorge Zaragoza	Stark	14	2	7						9
7	911	(France) Jordi Tixier	Yamaha	7	7	12						8
8	28	(United States) Christian Craig	Honda	5	11	3						6
9	20	(France) Greg Aranda	KTM	8	14	16						3
10	45	(United States) Colt Nichols	Suzuki	11	8	10						3
11	98	(United States) Austin Politelli	Honda	9	Ret	9						2
12	21	(United States) Jason Anderson	Suzuki	13	9	5						2
13	78	(United States) Kevin Moranz	KTM	10	12	13						1
14	141	(France) Maxime Desprey	Yamaha	12	10	11						1
	4	(Australia) Luke Clout	Kawasaki	15	13	14						0
	800	(United States) Mike Alessi	Honda	16	15	15						0
Pos	Nr	Rider	Bike	CAN (Canada)			GBR (United Kingdom)	ARG (Argentina)	AUS (Australia)	TBA (South Africa)	NZL (New Zealand)	Points

== SX2 ==
=== Entry list ===
Licensed Teams & Riders
Team	Constructor	No	Rider	Rounds
(United States) Rocket Doctor/Rick Ware Racing	Yamaha	1	(United Kingdom) Max Anstie	1
(United States) Rocket Doctor/Rick Ware Racing	Yamaha	70	(United States) Devin Simonson	1
(France) Team Venum Bud Racing Kawasaki	Kawasaki	3	(Australia) Jake Cannon	
(France) Team Venum Bud Racing Kawasaki	Kawasaki	29	(United States) Henry Miller	1
(France) Team Venum Bud Racing Kawasaki	Kawasaki	69	(United States) Jack Chambers	1
(Brazil) 595 Racing	KTM	4	(Brazil) Hector Assunção	
(Brazil) 595 Racing	KTM	260	(Germany) Nico Koch	1
(Brazil) 595 Racing	KTM	462	(United States) Luke Fauser	1
(France) Team GSM	Yamaha	11	(France) Calvin Fonvieille	1
(France) Team GSM	Yamaha	16	(Canada) Cole Thompson	1
(Spain) Stark	Stark	81	(Germany) Brian Hsu	1
(Spain) Stark	Stark	460	(United States) Michael Hicks	1
(Australia) Quad Lock Honda Konsky Motorsport Group	Honda	88	(New Zealand) Brodie Connolly	1
(Australia) Quad Lock Honda Konsky Motorsport Group	Honda	142	(United States) Cameron McAdoo	
(Australia) Konsky Motorsport Group	Kawasaki	142	(United States) Cameron McAdoo	1
(United States) Twisted Tea PMG Suzuki	Suzuki	110	(United States) Kyle Peters	1
(United States) Twisted Tea PMG Suzuki	Suzuki	412	(United States) Crockett Myers	1
(United States) MCR Honda	Honda	200	(United States) Ryan Breece	1
(United States) MCR Honda	Honda	237	(United States) Robbie Wageman	1
Wildcard Teams & Riders

==== Riders Championship ====
Points are awarded to the top-ten finishers of the first two races, in the following format:

Position	1st	2nd	3rd	4th	5th	6th	7th	8th	9th	10th
Points	10	9	8	7	6	5	4	3	2	1

Points are awarded to the top-twenty finishers of the third race, in the following format:

Position	1st	2nd	3rd	4th	5th	6th	7th	8th	9th	10th	11th	12th	13th	14th	15th	16th	17th	18th	19th	20th
Points	25	22	20	18	16	15	14	13	12	11	10	9	8	7	6	5	4	3	2	1

Pos	Nr	Rider	Bike	CAN (Canada)			GBR (United Kingdom)	ARG (Argentina)	AUS (Australia)	TBA (South Africa)	NZL (New Zealand)	Points
1	1	(United Kingdom) Max Anstie	Yamaha	1	1	1						45
2	460	(United States) Michael Hicks	Stark	3	2	3						37
3	142	(United States) Cameron McAdoo	Kawasaki	4	4	2						36
4	110	(United States) Kyle Peters	Suzuki	6	9	5						23
5	16	(Canada) Cole Thompson	Yamaha	8	12	4						21
6	88	(New Zealand) Brodie Connolly	Honda	7	6	9						21
7	70	(United States) Devin Simonson	Yamaha	2	5	15						21
8	81	(Germany) Brian Hsu	Stark	5	3	16						19
9	462	(United States) Luke Fauser	KTM	13	10	6						16
10	237	(United States) Robbie Wageman	Honda	10	11	7						15
11	69	(United States) Jack Chambers	Kawasaki	12	7	10						15
12	260	(Germany) Nico Koch	KTM	14	15	8						13
13	200	(United States) Ryan Breece	Honda	11	8	12						12
14	11	(France) Calvin Fonvieille	Yamaha	15	14	11						10
15	411	(United States) Crockett Myers	Suzuki	9	16	14						9
16	29	(United States) Henry Miller	Kawasaki	Ret	13	13						8
Pos	Nr	Rider	Bike	CAN (Canada)			GBR (United Kingdom)	ARG (Argentina)	AUS (Australia)	TBA (South Africa)	NZL (New Zealand)	Points

== Teams Championship ==
Pos	Team	CAN (Canada)	GBR (United Kingdom)	ARG (Argentina)	AUS (Australia)	TBA (South Africa)	NZL (New Zealand)	Points
1	(United States) Rocket Doctor/Rick Ware Racing	101						101
2	(Australia) Quad Lock Honda Konsky Motorsport Group	79						79
3	(Spain) Stark	77						77
4	(France) Team GSM	40						40
5	(United States) Twisted Tea PMG Suzuki	37						37
6	(France) Team Venum Bud Racing Kawasaki	35						35
7	(United States) MCR Honda	29						29
8	(Brazil) 595 Racing	19						19
Pos	Team	CAN (Canada)	GBR (United Kingdom)	ARG (Argentina)	AUS (Australia)	TBA (South Africa)	NZL (New Zealand)	Points
