= 2026 AMA Supercross Championship =

Edition of AMA Supercross Championship

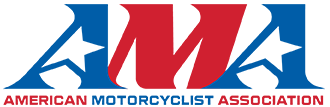
- Organizer: American Motorcyclist Association, Feld Entertainment (except Daytona), NASCAR Holdings, Inc. (Daytona)
- Discipline: Supercross
- Duration: January – May 2026
- Races: 17
- TV partners: NBC Sports (NBC, Peacock)

Champions
- 450cc: (Germany) Ken Roczen
- 250cc West: (United States) Haiden Deegan
- 250cc East: (New Zealand) Cole Davies

AMA Supercross Championship
- ← 2025 2027 →

The 2026 AMA Supercross Championship was the 53rd season of off-road stadium motorcycle racing in the United States.

Comprising 17 rounds, the series ran from January until May, crowning supercross champions in both the 250cc and 450cc classes, concluding with the Salt Lake City round on May 9. Cooper Webb went into the season as the reigning champion in the premier 450SX class.

The series formed the first part of the 2026 SuperMotocross World Championship.

== Schedule and results ==
The 2026 AMA Supercross Championship was the 53rd season of off-road stadium motorcycle racing in the United States. Comprising 17 rounds, the series ran from January until May, crowning supercross champions in both the 250cc and 450cc classes, concluding with the Salt Lake City round on May 9.

2026 Monster Energy AMA Supercross Championship
Round (250 East/West)	Date	Location	Stadium	Broadcast	450cc Winner	250cc Winner
1 (W)	January 10	(California) Anaheim	Angel Stadium	Peacock (live)	(United States) Eli Tomac (I)	(United Kingdom) Max Anstie (I)
2 (W)	January 17	(California) San Diego	Snapdragon Stadium	Peacock (live), NBC (delay)	(United States) Eli Tomac (II)	(United States) Haiden Deegan (I)
3 (W)	January 24	(California) Anaheim	Angel Stadium	Peacock (live)	(United States) Chase Sexton (I)	(United States) Haiden Deegan (II)
4 (W)	January 31	(Texas) Houston	NRG Stadium	Peacock (live)	(United States) Cooper Webb (I)	(United States) Haiden Deegan (III)
5 (W)	February 7	(Arizona) Glendale	State Farm Stadium	Peacock (live)	(Germany) Ken Roczen (I)	(United States) Haiden Deegan (IV)
6 (W)	February 14	(Washington (state)) Seattle	Lumen Field	Peacock (live)	(United States) Eli Tomac (III)	(United States) Haiden Deegan (V)
7 (E)	February 21	(Texas) Arlington	AT&T Stadium	Peacock (live)	(Australia) Hunter Lawrence (I)	(United States) Pierce Brown (I)
8 (E)	February 28	(Florida) Daytona	Daytona International Speedway	Peacock (live)	(United States) Eli Tomac (IV)	(United States) Seth Hammaker (I)
9 (E)	March 7	(Indiana) Indianapolis	Lucas Oil Stadium	Peacock (live)	(Australia) Hunter Lawrence (II)	(New Zealand) Cole Davies (I)
10 (E/W)	March 21	(Alabama) Birmingham	Protective Stadium	Peacock (live), NBC (delay)	(Australia) Hunter Lawrence (III)	(New Zealand) Cole Davies (II)
11 (E)	March 28	(Michigan) Detroit	Ford Field	Peacock (live)	(Germany) Ken Roczen (II)	(New Zealand) Cole Davies (III)
12 (E/W)	April 4	(Missouri) St. Louis	The Dome at America's Center	Peacock (live)	(Germany) Ken Roczen (III)	(United States) Haiden Deegan (VI)
13 (E)	April 11	(Tennessee) Nashville	Nissan Stadium	Peacock & NBC (live)	(Australia) Hunter Lawrence (IV)	(New Zealand) Cole Davies (IV)
14 (E)	April 18	(Ohio) Cleveland	Huntington Bank Field	Peacock & NBC (live) & (delay)	(Germany) Ken Roczen (IV)	(United States) Nate Thrasher (I)
15 (E)	April 25	(Pennsylvania) Philadelphia	Lincoln Financial Field	Peacock (live), NBC (delay)	(Germany) Ken Roczen (V)	(New Zealand) Cole Davies (V)
16 (W)	May 2	(Colorado) Denver	Empower Field at Mile High	Peacock (live), NBC (delay)	(Australia) Hunter Lawrence (V)	(United States) Haiden Deegan (VII)
17 (E/W)	May 9	(Utah) Salt Lake City	Rice-Eccles Stadium	Peacock, NBC (delay)	(United States) Chase Sexton (II)	(New Zealand) Cole Davies (VI)

=== Stadium locations ===
2026 AMA Supercross Championship locations

== 450 SX ==
=== Entry list ===
Team	Constructor	No	Rider	Rounds
Monster Energy Yamaha Star Racing	Yamaha	1	(United States) Cooper Webb	All
Monster Energy Yamaha Star Racing	Yamaha	32	(United States) Justin Cooper	All
Red Bull KTM Factory Racing	KTM	3	(United States) Eli Tomac	1–14, 16–17
Red Bull KTM Factory Racing	KTM	7	(United States) Aaron Plessinger	1–10
Red Bull KTM Factory Racing	KTM	26	(Spain) Jorge Prado	1–6, 9–17
Monster Energy Kawasaki	Kawasaki	4	(United States) Chase Sexton	1–7, 11–17
Monster Energy Kawasaki	Kawasaki	36	(United States) Garrett Marchbanks	1, 3–17
Partzilla Rokit Racing	Kawasaki	11	(United States) Kyle Chisholm	15–17
Partzilla Rokit Racing	Kawasaki	41	(United States) Mitchell Harrison	All
Partzilla Rokit Racing	Kawasaki	208	(United States) Logan Leitzel	7–15, 17
Partzilla Rokit Racing	Kawasaki	784	(United States) Cade Clason	1–4, 10–17
Quadlock Honda Racing	Honda	12	(United States) Shane McElrath	All
Quadlock Honda Racing	Honda	15	(United Kingdom) Dean Wilson	13–17
Quadlock Honda Racing	Honda	17	(United States) Joey Savatgy	1–9, 11–16
Quadlock Honda Racing	Honda	28	(United States) Christian Craig	All
Troy Lee Designs Red Bull Ducati Factory Racing	Ducati	14	(France) Dylan Ferrandis	1–8, 11–17
Troy Lee Designs Red Bull Ducati Factory Racing	Ducati	51	(United States) Justin Barcia	1, 15–17
Honda HRC Progressive	Honda	18	(Australia) Jett Lawrence	
Honda HRC Progressive	Honda	96	(Australia) Hunter Lawrence	All
Triumph Factory Racing Team	Triumph	20	(United States) Jordon Smith	7–17
Triumph Factory Racing Team	Triumph	33	(United States) Austin Forkner	1–3
Twisted Tea Suzuki Presented by Progressive Insurance	Suzuki	21	(United States) Jason Anderson	1–7
Twisted Tea Suzuki Presented by Progressive Insurance	Suzuki	45	(United States) Colt Nichols	All
Twisted Tea Suzuki Presented by Progressive Insurance	Suzuki	891	(United States) Justin Bogle	10–12, 17
Rockstar Energy Husqvarna Factory Racing	Husqvarna	24	(United States) RJ Hampshire	1–5
Rockstar Energy Husqvarna Factory Racing	Husqvarna	27	(United States) Malcolm Stewart	All
	Yamaha	44	(United States) Ty Masterpool	4
Gizmo Racing Yamaha	Yamaha	44	(United States) Ty Masterpool	6
Gizmo Racing Yamaha	Yamaha	63	(Sweden) Fredrik Norén	1–11, 13–17
Gizmo Racing Yamaha	Yamaha	106	(France) Stephen Rubini	1–2
Team Tedder Racing	KTM	46	(United States) Justin Hill	All
Liqui Moly Beta Racing	Beta	52	(United States) Mitchell Oldenburg	1–2
Liqui Moly Beta Racing	Beta	54	(United States) Benny Bloss	
Champion Tool Storage KMR KTM	KTM	62	(United States) Grant Harlan	All
Champion Tool Storage KMR KTM	KTM	78	(United States) Kevin Moranz	All
The McGinley Clinic Privateer Support Program	Yamaha	64	(France) Romain Pape	1–3, 5
The McGinley Clinic Privateer Support Program	KTM	197	(United States) Brian Saunier	13
The McGinley Clinic Privateer Support Program	Husqvarna	411	(United States) Scott Meshey	All
The McGinley Clinic Privateer Support Program	Yamaha	412	(United States) Jared Lesher	8, 10, 12–13
The McGinley Clinic Privateer Support Program	Yamaha	512	(United States) Austin Cozadd	6–8
The McGinley Clinic Privateer Support Program	Yamaha	711	(United States) Tristan Lane	All
The McGinley Clinic Privateer Support Program	Honda	874	(United States) Zack Williams	All
Heartbeat Hot Sauce NanoXtreme Yamaha	Yamaha	66	(Canada) Cole Thompson	3–4, 7–13, 17
Heartbeat Hot Sauce NanoXtreme Yamaha	Yamaha	237	(United States) Robbie Wageman	7
Valley Motorsports	Honda	87	(United States) Jeremy Hand	10, 12, 16–17
Short Racing	Honda	90	(United States) John Short IV	4–5, 10, 12, 16–17
Progressive Insurance Cycle Gear Suzuki	Suzuki	94	(Germany) Ken Roczen	All
Harriman Concepts	KTM	116	(United States) Devin Harriman	6
Firefly/Mountain Movers/Jones Powersports	Kawasaki	118	(United States) Cheyenne Harmon	3, 7–13, 15–17
TB Racing	Gas Gas	120	(United States) Todd Bannister	16
The Dirt Legal DBDRacing WMR KTM	KTM	123	(Venezuela) Anthony Rodríguez	10–13, 15, 17
JSR Motorsports	Yamaha	124	(United States) Justin Starling	7–10, 12–13, 16–17
MotoWhips Racing	KTM	129	(United States) Lane Shaw	10–13, 16
MotoWhips Racing	KTM	667	(Sweden) Anton Nordström	1, 3, 5, 7
MotoWhips Racing	KTM	734	(United States) Dayton Briggs	1–2, 10–12
La Granja Racing	Kawasaki	134	(Brazil) Caio Lopes	8
Collin Allen Racing	Yamaha	135	(United States) Collin Allen	10, 12
HBI Racing	KTM	137	(United States) Ayden Shive	8
DPMX/Onlyfans Racing	Yamaha	138	(United States) David Pulley	1–3, 5–6, 10, 12, 15–16
EBR Family Powersports	Yamaha	146	(United States) Hayes Edwards	12, 16
Dirt Store Triumph Racing	Triumph	166	(United Kingdom) Dylan Woodcock	1–3
Onlyfans	Kawasaki	169	(United States) Logan Karnow	1–2, 13–17
MotoConcepts Racing	Honda	200	(United States) Ryan Breece	3
Motosport Hillsboro Legacy Racewear Kawasaki	Kawasaki	207	(United States) Rider Fisher	3, 6, 16
Torchbearer Sauces Kawasaki	Kawasaki	208	(United States) Logan Leitzel	1–4
Gibbs Racing	Yamaha	214	(Canada) Tyler Gibbs	17
ESS Farms	Yamaha	246	(United States) Chance Blackburn	6
Malcolm Racing	Yamaha	267	(United States) Carter Malcolm	16
Team LMR	Suzuki	281	(United States) Cory Carsten	7–17
Skwok B-Dub Motorsports Racing	Yamaha	289	(United States) Robert Hailey III	1–3
US 27 Motorsports	Beta	299	(United States) Konnor Visger	1–2
MPS/Steel Horse/Cizi Clean/Pioneer Electric	Honda	316	(United States) Ty Freehill	17
Biese Racing	Kawasaki	343	(United States) Carter Biese	9–10, 12
The Law Tigers Privateer Paddock	Husqvarna	344	(United States) Justin Aragaki	2–3
Charlie T’s Crawfish & Seafood	Gas Gas	346	(United States) Charles Tolleson IV	7, 10, 13
Morris Racing	KTM	414	(United States) Mason Morris	12–14
ISRT Kawasaki	Kawasaki	417	(Norway) Cornelius Tøndel	13
ISRT Kawasaki	Kawasaki	604	(United States) Max Miller	1–5
ISRT Kawasaki	Kawasaki	719	(United States) Vince Friese	All
Mosites Motorsports	Kawasaki	437	(United States) Vinny Luhovey	11, 13–15
MotoNation Suzuki	Suzuki	484	(United States) Doc Smith	9–10, 14
Randanella Racing	Kawasaki	489	(United States) Ricci Randanella	8, 15
Turn One Powersports KTM	KTM	501	(United States) Scotty Wennerstrom	7, 9–10, 12–13, 17
Cartwright Racing	Kawasaki	519	(United States) Joshua Cartwright	1–9, 13, 15–17
Addison Emory Racing	Yamaha	538	(United States) Addison Emory IV	8–9, 16
Buller Racing	Husqvarna	542	(United States) Johnnie Buller	3
Underdog Racing	Honda	581	(United States) Kyle Bitterman	4–5, 13, 15
Kalaitzian Brothers Racing	Honda	636	(United States) Luke Kalaitzian	5
Piazza Racing	Yamaha	637	(United States) Bobby Piazza	All
	Kawasaki	672	(United States) Brandon Pederson	7–8
Fitch Racing Inc	Yamaha	676	(United States) Robert Fitch	8
Wharton Racing	Kawasaki	767	(United States) Mason Wharton	6
Next Level Racing	Gas Gas	800	(Canada) Preston Masciangelo	11
Dickey Racing	Suzuki	812	(United States) Luke Dickey	4, 7
LSR Stahlman Powersports Kawasaki	Kawasaki	824	(United States) Carter Stephenson	9–12, 14
Team Faith	Yamaha	848	(Spain) Joan Cros	12–15
Lasting Impressions CG llc.	Honda	873	(United States) Ronnie Orres	7, 10, 13
Team ESSFarms Racing	Yamaha	877	(United States) Anthony Castaneda	17
TMR Racing	Kawasaki	976	(United States) Josh Greco	1–10, 13–17
Yankton Motorsports	Kawasaki	996	(United States) Preston Taylor	7–15, 17

=== Championship Standings ===
Pos	Rider	Bike	ANA (California)	SDI (California)	ANA (California)	HOU (Texas)	GLE (Arizona)	SEA (Washington (state))	ARL (Texas)	DAY (Florida)	IND (Indiana)	BIR (Alabama)	DET (Michigan)	STL (Missouri)	NAS (Tennessee)	CLE (Ohio)	PHI (Pennsylvania)	DEN (Colorado)	SLC (Utah)	Points
1	(Germany) Ken Roczen	Suzuki	2	3	8	3	1	10	4	3	5	2	1	1	3	1	1	2	5	349
2	(Australia) Hunter Lawrence	Honda	4	2	2	2	2	4	1	2	1	1	18	3	1	6	3	1	7	346
3	(United States) Cooper Webb	Yamaha	7	8	5	1	3	2	3	4	3	6	6	5	2	2	2	11	4	315
4	(United States) Eli Tomac	KTM	1	1	3	4	12	1	2	1	2	3	5	6	12	DNS		3	DNQ	275
5	(United States) Justin Cooper	Yamaha	6	6	10	9	4	3	5	12	4	4	4	2	7	3	13	13	2	273
6	(United States) Chase Sexton	Kawasaki	8	4	1	5	7	5	6				2	Ret	4	4	7	5	1	237
7	(United States) Malcolm Stewart	Husqvarna	Ret	10	12	8	Ret	6	11	10	7	5	3	8	18	7	10	4	8	204
8	(United States) Joey Savatgy	Honda	13	5	6	14	6	8	7	5	9		9	7	16	5	4	DNQ		194
9	(Spain) Jorge Prado	KTM	3 (Note: Prado was docked three points following the first round after failing a post race noise test.)	13	7	7	5	DNQ			6	7	13	4	13	15	16	6	3	189
10	(United States) Justin Hill	KTM	14	14	15	17	10	11	12	9	12	11	8	14	5	8	5	15	6	188
11	(France) Dylan Ferrandis	Ducati	9	9	11	10	9	9	10	Ret			7	10	6	9	12 (Note: Ferrandis was docked three positions following the fifteenth round for cutting the track.)	10	11	176
12	(United States) Christian Craig	Honda	11	15	13	12	14	DNQ	9	13	8	17	12	11	14	13	15	12	9	154
13	(United States) Shane McElrath	Honda	17	18	18	18	15	14	13	8	10	12	14	12	10	10	6	16	13	150
14	(United States) Garrett Marchbanks	Kawasaki	DNQ		14	15	13	22	Ret	7	14	10	10	9	8	11	9	7	12	142
15	(United States) Colt Nichols	Suzuki	12	16	16	16	16	13	14	11	17	8	17	13	9	DNQ	DNQ	17	14	116
16	(United States) Aaron Plessinger	KTM	10	7	Ret	13	8	7	8	6	19	21								99
17	(United States) Jason Anderson	Suzuki	5	11	4	6	11	12	21											84
18	(United States) Mitchell Harrison	Kawasaki	20	20	20	20	19	17	16	20	16	15	15	15	DNQ	18	14	18	16	73
19	(United States) Jordon Smith	Triumph							19	17	11	9	11	17	22	14	18	14	Ret	68
20	(United States) Vince Friese	Kawasaki	19	17	19 (Note: Friese was docked five points following the third round)	19	17	19	15	14	13	13	16	21	15	16	20	DNQ	18	66
21	(United Kingdom) Dean Wilson	Honda													11	12	8	9	10	60
22	(United States) Grant Harlan	KTM	DNQ	21	DNQ	DNQ	20	16	DNQ	15	15	14	DNQ	16	DNQ	21	19	20	17	48
23	(United States) RJ Hampshire	Husqvarna	18	12	9	11	DNQ													38
24	(United States) Justin Barcia	Ducati	21														11	8	15	33
25	(United States) Kevin Moranz	KTM	DNQ	19	DNQ	DNQ	DNQ	15	17	DNQ	18	20	19	19	17	DNQ	DNQ	19	DNQ	30
26	(Sweden) Fredrik Norén	Yamaha	DNQ	DNQ	DNQ	DNQ	18	DNQ	DNQ	18	20	16	DNQ		21	19	DNQ	DNQ	DNQ	20
27	(Canada) Cole Thompson	Yamaha			DNQ	DNQ			DNQ	16	21	19	Ret	18	DNQ				20	16
28	(United States) Cade Clason	Kawasaki	DNQ	DNQ	DNQ	22						22	DNQ	DNQ	DNQ	17	17	21	19	14
29	(United States) Tristan Lane	Yamaha	DNQ	DNQ	DNQ	21	DNQ	20	18	19	22	DNQ	20	DNQ	19	20 (Note: Lane was docked five points following the fourteenth round)	DNQ	22	21	13
30	(United States) Austin Forkner	Triumph	15	DNQ	17															12
31	(United States) Mitchell Oldenburg	Beta	16	DNQ																6
32	(United States) Justin Bogle	Suzuki										18	21	DNQ					DNQ	5
33	(United States) Ty Masterpool	Yamaha				DNQ		18												4
34	(United States) Josh Cartwright	Kawasaki	DNQ	DNQ	DNQ	DNQ	21	21	20	DNQ	DNQ				DNQ		DNQ	DNQ	DNQ	4
35	(United States) Zack Williams	Honda	DNQ	DNQ	DNQ	DNQ	DNQ	DNQ	DNQ	DNQ	DNQ	DNQ	DNQ	DNQ	20	DNQ	DNQ	DNQ	DNQ	2
36	(United States) Jeremy Hand	Honda										DNQ		20				DNQ	DNQ	2
37	(United States) Scott Meshey	Husqvarna	DNQ	DNQ	DNQ	DNQ	DNQ	DNQ	DNQ	21	DNQ	DNQ	DNQ	DNQ	DNQ	DNQ	21	DNQ	DNQ	2
38	(United States) Ryan Breece	Honda			21															1
	(United States) Max Miller	Kawasaki	DNQ	22	DNQ	DNQ	DNQ													0
	(United States) Vinny Luhovey	Kawasaki											DNQ		DNQ	22	DNQ			0
	(United States) Kyle Chisholm	Kawasaki															22	DNQ	DNQ	0
	(United States) Bobby Piazza	Yamaha	DNQ	DNQ	DNQ	DNQ	DNQ	DNQ	DNQ	DNQ	DNQ	DNQ	DNQ	DNQ	DNQ	DNQ	DNQ	DNQ	DNQ	0
	(United States) Josh Greco	Kawasaki	DNQ	DNQ	DNQ	DNQ	DNQ	DNQ	DNQ	DNQ	DNQ	DNQ			DNQ	DNQ	DNQ	DNQ	DNQ	0
	(United States) Logan Leitzel	Kawasaki	DNQ	DNQ	DNQ	DNQ			DNQ	DNQ	DNQ	DNQ	DNQ	DNQ	DNQ	DNQ	DNQ		DNQ	0
	(United States) Cheyenne Harmon	Kawasaki			DNQ				DNQ	DNQ	DNQ	DNQ	DNQ	DNQ	DNQ		DNQ	DNQ	DNQ	0
	(United States) Cory Carsten	Suzuki							DNQ	DNQ	DNQ	DNQ	DNQ	DNQ	DNQ	DNQ	DNQ	DNQ	DNQ	0
	(United States) Preston Taylor	Kawasaki							DNQ	DNQ	DNQ	DNQ	DNQ	DNQ	DNQ	DNQ	DNQ		DNQ	0
	(United States) David Pulley	Yamaha	DNQ	DNQ	DNQ		DNQ	DNQ				DNQ		DNQ			DNQ	DNQ		0
	(United States) Justin Starling	Yamaha							DNQ	DNQ	DNQ	DNQ		DNQ	DNQ			DNQ	DNQ	0
	(United States) Logan Karnow	Kawasaki	DNQ	DNQ											DNQ	DNQ	DNQ	DNQ	DNQ	0
	(United States) John Short IV	Honda				DNQ	DNQ					DNQ		DNQ				DNQ	DNQ	0
	(United States) Scotty Wennerstrom	KTM							DNQ		DNQ	DNQ		DNQ	DNQ				DNQ	0
	(Venezuela) Anthony Rodríguez	KTM										DNQ	DNQ	DNQ	DNQ		DNQ		DNQ	0
	(United States) Dayton Briggs	KTM	DNQ	DNQ								DNQ	DNQ	DNQ						0
	(United States) Carter Stephenson	Kawasaki									DNQ	DNQ	DNQ	DNQ		DNQ				0
	(United States) Lane Shaw	KTM										DNQ	DNQ	DNQ	DNQ			DNQ		0
	(France) Romain Pape	Yamaha	DNQ	DNQ	DNQ		DNQ													0
	(Sweden) Anton Nordström	KTM	DNQ		DNQ		DNQ		DNQ											0
	(United States) Kyle Bitterman	Honda				DNQ	DNQ								DNQ		DNQ			0
	(United States) Jared Lesher	Yamaha								DNQ		DNQ		DNQ	DNQ					0
	(Spain) Joan Cros	Yamaha												DNQ	DNQ	DNQ	DNQ			0
	(United Kingdom) Dylan Woodcock	Triumph	DNQ	DNQ	DNQ															0
	(United States) Robert Hailey III	Yamaha	DNQ	DNQ	DNQ															0
	(United States) Rider Fisher	Kawasaki			DNQ			DNQ										DNQ		0
	(United States) Austin Cozadd	Yamaha						DNQ	DNQ	DNQ										0
	(United States) Ronnie Orres	Honda							DNQ			DNQ			DNQ					0
	(United States) Charles Tolleson IV	Gas Gas							DNQ			DNQ			DNQ					0
	(United States) Addison Emory IV	Yamaha								DNQ	DNQ							DNQ		0
	(United States) Carter Biese	Kawasaki									DNQ	DNQ		DNQ						0
	(United States) Doc Smith	Suzuki									DNQ	DNQ				DNQ				0
	(United States) Mason Morris	KTM												DNQ	DNQ	DNQ				0
	(France) Stephen Rubini	Yamaha	DNQ	DNQ																0
	(United States) Konnor Visger	Beta	DNQ	DNQ																0
	(United States) Justin Aragaki	Husqvarna		DNQ	DNQ															0
	(United States) Luke Dickey	Suzuki				DNQ			DNQ											0
	(United States) Brandon Pederson	Kawasaki							DNQ	DNQ										0
	(United States) Ricci Randanella	Kawasaki								DNQ							DNQ			0
	(United States) Collin Allen	Yamaha										DNQ		DNQ						0
	(United States) Hayes Edwards	Yamaha												DNQ				DNQ		0
	(United States) Johnnie Buller	Husqvarna			DNQ															0
	(United States) Luke Kalaitzian	Honda					DNQ													0
	(United States) Chance Blackburn	Yamaha						DNQ												0
	(United States) Mason Wharton	Kawasaki						DNQ												0
	(United States) Devin Harriman	KTM						DNQ												0
	(United States) Robbie Wageman	Yamaha							DNQ											0
	(United States) Ayden Shive	KTM								DNQ										0
	(United States) Robert Fitch	Yamaha								DNQ										0
	(Brazil) Caio Lopes	Kawasaki								DNQ										0
	(Canada) Preston Masciangelo	Gas Gas											DNQ							0
	(Norway) Cornelius Tøndel	Kawasaki													DNQ					0
	(United States) Brian Saunier	KTM													DNQ					0
	(United States) Carter Malcolm	Yamaha																DNQ		0
	(United States) Todd Bannister	Gas Gas																DNQ		0
	(United States) Anthony Castaneda	Yamaha																	DNQ	0
	(United States) Ty Freehill	Honda																	DNQ	0
	(Canada) Tyler Gibbs	Yamaha																	DNQ	0
Pos	Rider	Bike	ANA (California)	SDI (California)	ANA (California)	HOU (Texas)	GLE (Arizona)	SEA (Washington (state))	ARL (Texas)	DAY (Florida)	IND (Indiana)	BIR (Alabama)	DET (Michigan)	STL (Missouri)	NAS (Tennessee)	CLE (Ohio)	PHI (Pennsylvania)	DEN (Colorado)	SLC (Utah)	Points

== 250 SX West ==
=== Entry list ===
Team	Constructor	No	Rider	Rounds
Monster Energy Yamaha Star Racing	Yamaha	1	(United States) Haiden Deegan	All
Monster Energy Yamaha Star Racing	Yamaha	23	(United States) Michael Mosiman	1–6
Monster Energy Yamaha Star Racing	Yamaha	61	(United Kingdom) Max Anstie	All
Monster Energy Yamaha Star Racing	Yamaha	99	(Australia) Kayden Minear	9–10
ClubMX Yamaha	Yamaha	19	(United States) Maximus Vohland	All
ClubMX Yamaha	Yamaha	60	(United States) Hunter Yoder	All
Honda HRC Progressive	Honda	29	(United States) Chance Hymas	1–3
Rockstar Energy Husqvarna Factory Racing	Husqvarna	34	(United States) Ryder DiFrancesco	All
Toyota Redlands BarX Yamaha	Yamaha	40	(United States) Parker Ross	All
Toyota Redlands BarX Yamaha	Yamaha	42	(United States) Dilan Schwartz	1–4, 7–8
Toyota Redlands BarX Yamaha	Yamaha	43	(United States) Lux Turner	All
Toyota Redlands BarX Yamaha	Yamaha	154	(United States) Leo Tucker	1–2, 5–6, 9
Monster Energy Pro Circuit Kawasaki	Kawasaki	47	(United States) Levi Kitchen	All
Monster Energy Pro Circuit Kawasaki	Kawasaki	142	(United States) Cameron McAdoo	1–6, 9–10
AEO Powersports KTM Racing	KTM	57	(United States) Avery Long	1–7
AEO Powersports KTM Racing	KTM	71	(United States) Carson Mumford	1–7, 9
AEO Powersports KTM Racing	KTM	378	(United States) Kyle Wise	5–6
Heartbeat Hot Sauce NanoXtreme Yamaha	Yamaha	66	(Canada) Cole Thompson	5, 9
Heartbeat Hot Sauce NanoXtreme Yamaha	Yamaha	237	(United States) Robbie Wageman	1–5, 9–10
Heartbeat Hot Sauce NanoXtreme Yamaha	Yamaha	964	(Germany) Dominique Thury	1–5
Partzilla Rokit PRMX Racing	Kawasaki	69	(United States) Jack Chambers	1
Partzilla Rokit PRMX Racing	Kawasaki	70	(France) Anthony Bourdon	1–4
Partzilla Rokit PRMX Racing	Kawasaki	208	(United States) Logan Leitzel	5–6, 9
Triumph Racing Factory Team	Triumph	74	(United States) Gage Linville	9–10
SLR Honda	Honda	83	(United States) Justin Rodbell	All
SLR Honda	Honda	245	(Denmark) Matti Jørgensen	1–6
The Law Tigers Privateer Paddock	Yamaha	113	(United States) Braden Spangle	1–3, 5
The Law Tigers Privateer Paddock	Yamaha	158	(Mexico) Tre Fierro	1–3, 5
The Law Tigers Privateer Paddock	Husqvarna	344	(United States) Justin Aragaki	1, 4, 6–8
Grindstone Friesen Group Kawasaki	Kawasaki	115	(United States) Max Sanford	9–10
Grindstone Friesen Group Kawasaki	Kawasaki	224	(United States) Joshua Varize	All
Grindstone Friesen Group Kawasaki	Kawasaki	425	(United States) Reven Gordon	1, 3–10
Lane Shaw Racing	Kawasaki	129	(United States) Lane Shaw	2–4
EBR Family Powersports	Yamaha	131	(United States) Crockett Myers	9–10
The McGinley Clinic Privateer Support Program	Suzuki	131	(United States) Crockett Myers	1–8
The McGinley Clinic Privateer Support Program	KTM	197	(United States) Brian Saunier	1–5, 8–10
The McGinley Clinic Privateer Support Program	Yamaha	512	(United States) Austin Cozadd	1–5
HBI Racing	KTM	137	(United States) Ayden Shive	1–8
Gizmo Racing Yamaha	Yamaha	137	(United States) Ayden Shive	9–10
Gizmo Racing Yamaha	Yamaha	900	(United States) Keegan Rowley	All
Americore SBR Husqvarna Racing	Husqvarna	155	(United States) Dylan Cunha	1–3, 5–6, 9–10
Next Level Racing	Honda	173	(United States) Hunter Schlosser	All
Next Level Racing	Honda	645	(United States) Colby Copp	1–6
Next Level Racing	Gas Gas	800	(Canada) Preston Masciangelo	All
Next Level Racing	Yamaha	805	(United States) Slade Varola	1–4
Gaskin Service/Gator Wraps Racing	Gas Gas	175	(United States) Kaden Lewis	1–6, 9–10
CDF-Racing Aquapoolsupply.com	Gas Gas	204	(Germany) Paul Bloy	2–6
CDF-Racing Aquapoolsupply.com	KTM	260	(Germany) Nico Koch	2–6
Gibbs Racing	Yamaha	214	(Canada) Tyler Gibbs	1–2, 5–6, 9
Boaz Racing	KTM	233	(United States) Josh Boaz	9
	Kawasaki	240	(United States) Mike Henderson	9
Wyatt Mattson Racing	Yamaha	279	(United States) Wyatt Mattson	1
FRT Motorsport	Kawasaki	284	(Italy) Lorenzo Camporese	1–6
3Bros Hatch Racing Husqvarna	Husqvarna	310	(United States) Kai Aiello	1–5, 9
Ty Freehill Racing	Honda	316	(United States) Ty Freehill	1–3, 9
Charlie T’s Crawfish & Seafood	Gas Gas	346	(United States) Charles Tolleson IV	1–5, 9
Barboa Racing	Yamaha	357	(United States) Kameron Barboa	9
Raylentless Racing	Triumph	388	(United States) Brandon Ray	1–3, 5–10
Kehoe/SDS/Vision Racing	Kawasaki	461	(United States) Hayden Robinson	1–3, 5
Turn One Powersports KTM	KTM	501	(United States) Scotty Wennerstrom	1–6, 9
AVL Racing Team	Husqvarna	585	(Canada) Blake Davies	1–5
	Kawasaki	672	(United States) Brandon Pederson	3–4, 6
Millikan Racing	Yamaha	674	(United States) Carson Millikan	1–3, 5–6, 9
	KTM	858	(France) Clément Briatte	2
Lasting Impressions CG llc.	Honda	873	(United States) Ronnie Orres	1–6, 8–10
Team ESSFarms Racing	Yamaha	877	(United States) Anthony Castaneda	1–3
TMR Racing	Kawasaki	976	(United States) Josh Greco	8
Yankton Motorsports	Kawasaki	996	(United States) Preston Taylor	9

=== Championship Standings ===
Pos	Rider	Bike	ANA (California)	SDI (California)	ANA (California)	HOU (Texas)	GLE (Arizona)	SEA (Washington (state))	BIR (Alabama)	STL (Missouri)	DEN (Colorado)	SLC (Utah)	Points
1	(United States) Haiden Deegan	Yamaha	4	1	1	1	1	1	2	1	1	4	233
2	(United States) Levi Kitchen	Kawasaki	6	4	21	2	2	2	5	7	2	2	177
3	(United Kingdom) Max Anstie	Yamaha	1	5	6	6	8	3	7	15	4	3	168
4	(United States) Ryder DiFrancesco	Husqvarna	3	7	3	5	5	4	19	5	3	5	164
5	(United States) Maximus Vohland	Yamaha	7	8	5	4 (Note: Vohland was docked three points following the fourth round after failing a post race noise test.)	6	7	8	10	10	6	146
6	(United States) Hunter Yoder	Yamaha	8	21	7	7	7	8	12	14	7	8	121
7	(United States) Cameron McAdoo	Kawasaki	22	2	4	3	3	5			13	21	107
8	(United States) Michael Mosiman	Yamaha	5	3	2	8	4	6					107
9	(United States) Parker Ross	Yamaha	14	11	9	9	10	9	DNQ	18	14	14	90
10	(United States) Lux Turner	Yamaha	15	13	19	13	11	12	15	19	6	11	86
11	(United States) Joshua Varize	Kawasaki	13	19	10	11	12	11	16	17	9	DNQ	80
12	(United States) Carson Mumford	KTM	11	14	8	10	19	10	DNQ		12		70
13	(United States) Avery Long	KTM	9	12	17	14	9	13	DNQ				58
14	(United States) Dilan Schwartz	Yamaha	10	9	11	DNS			14	DNQ			44
15	(United States) Robbie Wageman	Yamaha	12	Ret	16		13				8	DNQ	39
16	(United States) Crockett Myers	Suzuki	17	DNQ	13	18	14	14	20	DNQ			39
16	(United States) Crockett Myers	Yamaha									19	DNQ	39
17	(United States) Chance Hymas	Honda	2	6	22								38
18	(United States) Justin Rodbell	Honda	19	DNQ	14	17	15	Ret	DNQ	DNQ	16	16	35
19	(France) Anthony Bourdon	Kawasaki	16	10	DNQ	12							28
20	(Australia) Kayden Minear	Yamaha									5	12	27
21	(Denmark) Matti Jørgensen	Honda	18	DNQ	12	16	DNQ	16					26
22	(United States) Hunter Schlosser	Honda	DNQ	15	18	20	17	18	DNQ	DNQ	22	DNQ	22
23	(United States) Ayden Shive	KTM	DNQ	17	20	19	21	15	DNQ	DNQ			18
23	(United States) Ayden Shive	Yamaha									DNQ	DNQ	18
24	(Germany) Dominique Thury	Yamaha	DNQ	DNQ	15	15	DNQ						14
25	(Canada) Cole Thompson	Yamaha					16				15		13
26	(Canada) Preston Masciangelo	Gas Gas	DNQ	18	DNQ	DNQ	18	19	DNQ	DNQ	21	DNQ	12
27	(United States) Gage Linville	Triumph									11	DNQ	11
28	(Italy) Lorenzo Camporese	Kawasaki	21	16	DNQ	DNQ	DNQ	20					9
29	(United States) Brandon Ray	Triumph	20	DNQ	DNQ		DNQ	DNQ	DNQ	21	17	DNQ	8
30	(Germany) Nico Koch	KTM		DNQ	DNQ	DNQ	DNQ	17					5
31	(United States) Keegan Rowley	Yamaha	DNQ	DNQ	DNQ	21	DNQ	DNQ	DNQ	DNQ	18	DNQ	5
32	(United States) Reven Gordon	Kawasaki	DNQ		DNQ	DNQ	20	DNQ	DNQ	DNQ	20	DNQ	4
33	(United States) Ty Freehill	Honda	DNQ	20	DNQ						DNQ		2
34	(United States) Logan Leitzel	Kawasaki					DNQ	21			DNQ		1
	(United States) Colby Copp	Honda	DNQ	DNQ	DNQ	DNQ	22	DNQ					0
	(United States) Slade Varola	Yamaha	DNQ	DNQ	DNQ	22							0
	(United States) Ronnie Orres	Honda	DNQ	DNQ	DNQ	DNQ	DNQ	DNQ		DNQ	DNQ	DNQ	0
	(United States) Kaden Lewis	Gas Gas	DNQ	DNQ	DNQ	DNQ	DNQ	DNQ			DNQ	DNQ	0
	(United States) Brian Saunier	KTM	DNQ	DNQ	DNQ	DNQ	DNQ			DNQ	DNQ	DNQ	0
	(United States) Scotty Wennerstrom	KTM	DNQ	DNQ	DNQ	DNQ	DNQ	DNQ			DNQ		0
	(United States) Dylan Cunha	Husqvarna	DNQ	DNQ	DNQ		DNQ	DNQ			DNQ	DNQ	0
	(United States) Charles Tolleson IV	Gas Gas	DNQ	DNQ	DNQ	DNQ	DNQ				DNQ		0
	(United States) Kai Aiello	Husqvarna	DNQ	DNQ	DNQ	DNQ	DNQ				DNQ		0
	(United States) Carson Millikan	Yamaha	DNQ	DNQ	DNQ		DNQ	DNQ			DNQ		0
	(Canada) Blake Davies	Husqvarna	DNQ	DNQ	DNQ	DNQ	DNQ						0
	(United States) Austin Cozadd	Yamaha	DNQ	DNQ	DNQ	DNQ	DNQ						0
	(Canada) Tyler Gibbs	Yamaha	DNQ	DNQ			DNQ	DNQ			DNQ		0
	(United States) Leo Tucker	Yamaha	DNQ	DNQ			DNQ	DNQ			DNQ		0
	(United States) Justin Aragaki	Husqvarna	DNQ			DNQ		DNQ	DNQ	DNQ			0
	(Germany) Paul Bloy	Gas Gas		DNQ	DNQ	DNQ	DNQ	DNQ					0
	(United States) Braden Spangle	Yamaha	DNQ	DNQ	DNQ		DNQ						0
	(United States) Hayden Robinson	Kawasaki	DNQ	DNQ	DNQ		DNQ						0
	(Mexico) Tre Fierro	Yamaha	DNQ	DNQ	DNQ		DNQ						0
	(United States) Anthony Castaneda	Yamaha	DNQ	DNQ	DNQ								0
	(United States) Lane Shaw	Kawasaki		DNQ	DNQ	DNQ							0
	(United States) Brandon Pederson	Kawasaki			DNQ	DNQ		DNQ					0
	(United States) Kyle Wise	KTM					DNQ	DNQ					0
	(United States) Max Sanford	Kawasaki									DNQ	DNQ	0
	(United States) Jack Chambers	Kawasaki	DNQ										0
	(United States) Wyatt Mattson	Yamaha	DNQ										0
	(France) Clément Briatte	KTM		DNQ									0
	(United States) Josh Greco	Kawasaki								DNQ			0
	(United States) Josh Boaz	KTM									DNQ		0
	(United States) Preston Taylor	Kawasaki									DNQ		0
	(United States) Kameron Barboa	Yamaha									DNQ		0
	(United States) Mike Henderson	Kawasaki									DNQ		0
Pos	Rider	Bike	ANA (California)	SDI (California)	ANA (California)	HOU (Texas)	GLE (Arizona)	SEA (Washington (state))	BIR (Alabama)	STL (Missouri)	DEN (Colorado)	SLC (Utah)	Points

== 250 SX East ==
=== Entry list ===
Team	Constructor	No	Rider	Rounds
Monster Energy Pro Circuit Kawasaki	Kawasaki	10	(United States) Seth Hammaker	All
Monster Energy Pro Circuit Kawasaki	Kawasaki	35	(United States) Drew Adams	1–2, 7–8
Monster Energy Pro Circuit Kawasaki	Kawasaki	141	(United States) Nick Romano	4–10
ClubMX Yamaha	Yamaha	22	(United States) Coty Schock	All
ClubMX Yamaha	Yamaha	89	(United States) Devin Simonson	All
Monster Energy Yamaha Star Racing	Yamaha	25	(United States) Nate Thrasher	All
Monster Energy Yamaha Star Racing	Yamaha	37	(New Zealand) Cole Davies	All
Monster Energy Yamaha Star Racing	Yamaha	82	(United States) Caden Dudney	1–6
Monster Energy Yamaha Star Racing	Yamaha	163	(United States) Pierce Brown	1–4
Monster Energy Yamaha Star Racing	Yamaha	180	(United States) Landen Gordon	7–10
Honda HRC Progressive	Honda	30	(Japan) Jo Shimoda	1–6
Gizmo Racing Yamaha	Yamaha	39	(Switzerland) Valentin Guillod	1–4, 7–8
Gizmo Racing Yamaha	Yamaha	80	(United States) Bryce Shelly	1–3
Gizmo Racing Yamaha	Yamaha	775	(United States) CJ Benard	All
Phoenix Racing Honda	Honda	49	(United States) Cullin Park	1–4
Phoenix Racing Honda	Honda	73	(United States) Gavin Towers	1–3, 5–10
Phoenix Racing Honda	Honda	751	(United States) Evan Ferry	1–7
MX6 Racing	Kawasaki	53	(United States) Henry Miller	All
MX6 Racing	Kawasaki	65	(United States) Marshal Weltin	All
MX6 Racing	Kawasaki	77	(United States) Derek Kelley	All
Triumph Factory Racing Team	Triumph	56	(United States) Jalek Swoll	1–4
Rockstar Energy Husqvarna Factory Racing	Husqvarna	58	(United States) Daxton Bennick	All
Rockstar Energy Husqvarna Factory Racing	Husqvarna	59	(United States) Casey Cochran	5
EBR Performance	Yamaha	67	(Chile) Hardy Muñoz	1
EBR Performance	Yamaha	492	(United States) Landon Hartz	1–5, 7–9
Valley Motorsports	Honda	87	(United States) Jeremy Hand	1–3, 5, 7–9
Short Racing	Honda	90	(United States) John Short IV	1–3, 5, 7–9
Storm Lake Honda Buddy Brooks Racing	Honda	91	(United States) Izaih Clark	1–9
Storm Lake Honda Buddy Brooks Racing	Honda	95	(United States) Luke Neese	All
Partzilla Rokit Racing	Kawasaki	101	(Australia) Luke Clout	All
Partzilla Rokit Racing	Kawasaki	148	(United States) Kyle Peters	5–10
Partzilla Rokit Racing	Kawasaki	188	(United States) Hamden Hudson	1–9
Partzilla Rokit Racing	Kawasaki	832	(United States) Leum Oehlhof	3
The Dirt Legal DBDRacing WMR KTM	KTM	105	(South Africa) Marcus Phelps	All
The Dirt Legal DBDRacing WMR KTM	KTM	143	(United States) Jaxen Driskell	1, 9–10
The Dirt Legal DBDRacing WMR KTM	KTM	511	(United States) Jace Kessler	All
Stice Racing	Yamaha	125	(United States) Evan Stice	1–2
Team Hawkey Racing	Yamaha	130	(United States) Kyler Hawkey	1
Collin Allen Racing	Yamaha	135	(United States) Collin Allen	1–3, 5, 7–9
DPMX/Onlyfans Racing	Yamaha	138	(United States) David Pulley	1–2, 5, 7–8, 10
3D Racing KTM	KTM	140	(United States) Russell Buccheri	1–9
EBR Family Powersports	Yamaha	146	(United States) Hayes Edwards	1–5, 7–10
Peters Racing	Yamaha	148	(United States) Kyle Peters	1–4
Bon Air Exteriors Racing	Yamaha	151	(United States) Aidan Dickens	1–2
Horsepower Solutions Triumph of Harrisburg	Triumph	174	(United States) Luca Marsalisi	1–9
Arruda Racing	Kawasaki	181	(United States) Ashton Arruda	1–3, 9
Team LR22	Husqvarna	223	(United States) Logan Riggins	1–3, 5, 7–9
Raymond Racing	Gas Gas	239	(United States) Bryson Raymond	2, 7, 9
Malcolm Racing	Yamaha	267	(United States) Carter Malcolm	1–9
FrederickTown Yamaha	Yamaha	268	(United States) Gage Stine	1–3, 5, 7, 9
TiLube Honda	Honda	296	(United States) Ryder Floyd	1–9
BWR	Husqvarna	300	(United States) Jonathan Getz	1–5, 7, 9
Biese Racing	Kawasaki	343	(United States) Carter Biese	2, 5, 7, 9
Jack Rogers Racing	Kawasaki	351	(United States) Jack Rogers	2–3
Mosites Motorsports	Kawasaki	437	(United States) Vinny Luhovey	1–3
MotoNation Suzuki	Suzuki	464	(United States) Doc Smith	1–2, 5, 7, 9
Life of a Privateer	Yamaha	483	(United States) Bryton Carroll	1–3, 5, 7–9
Addison Emory Racing	Yamaha	538	(United States) Addison Emory IV	7–10
CCR Racing	Yamaha	573	(United States) Christopher Blackmer	2, 5, 7
Illinois Powersports	Kawasaki	588	(United States) Eddie Norred	7–8
Hazlett Racing	Kawasaki	650	(United States) Trevor Hazlett	5, 8
1909 Performance	KTM	689	(United States) Tony Usko	1–3
	KTM	728	(United States) RJ Johnson	7, 9
Wildcat Race Team	Gas Gas	809	(United States) Brayden Ehlermann	2–10
Ripper 822	Husqvarna	822	(United States) Riley Ripper	1–2, 6
LSR Stahlman Powersports Kawasaki	Kawasaki	824	(United States) Carter Stephenson	2, 7
ISRT Kawasaki	Kawasaki	943	(Canada) Noah Viney	1–4

=== Championship Standings ===
Pos	Rider	Bike	ARL (Texas)	DAY (Florida)	IND (Indiana)	BIR (Alabama)	DET (Michigan)	STL (Missouri)	NAS (Tennessee)	CLE (Ohio)	PHI (Pennsylvania)	SLC (Utah)	Points
1	(New Zealand) Cole Davies	Yamaha	5	2	1	1	1	2	1	3	1	1	231
2	(United States) Seth Hammaker	Kawasaki	4	1	3	3	2	3	5 (Note: Hammaker was demoted two positions following the thirteenth round for cutting the track.)	4	3	Ret	180
3	(United States) Daxton Bennick	Husqvarna	3	5	4	6	6	6	4	5	2	DNQ	160
4	(United States) Coty Schock	Yamaha	7	6	7	9	4	11	7	6	4	19	140
5	(United States) Nate Thrasher	Yamaha	11	7	10	10	21	4	2	1	5	18	137
6	(United States) Devin Simonson	Yamaha	8	9	6	11	19	8	3	7	6	20	124
7	(United States) Henry Miller	Kawasaki	15	13	DNQ	17	5	12	6	9	7	10	104
8	(Japan) Jo Shimoda	Honda	2	4	2	4	3	DNQ					100
9	(United States) Derek Kelley	Kawasaki	12	17	11	DNQ	9	13	19 (Note: Kelley was docked five points and one position following the thirteenth round for gaining a position whilst jumping on a red cross flag.)	8	8	7	89
10	(United States) Nick Romano	Kawasaki				18	7	9	8	11	14	15	72
11	(United States) Pierce Brown	Yamaha	1	3	5	21							63
12	(United States) Marshal Weltin	Kawasaki	Ret	15	18	DNQ	12	DNQ	9	15	10	DNQ	53
13	(United States) Kyle Peters	Yamaha	10	DNQ	12	DNQ							51
13	(United States) Kyle Peters	Kawasaki					8	22	17	12	DNQ	DNQ	51
14	(United States) Luke Neese	Honda	17	DNQ	14	DNQ	10	DNQ	12	17	15	DNQ	47
15	(United States) Gavin Towers	Honda	DNQ	20	19		14	DNQ	15	14	9	17	46
16	(Australia) Luke Clout	Kawasaki	16	DNQ	16	DNQ	13	20	13 (Note: Clout was docked five points following the thirteenth round for jumping on a red cross flag.)	13	DNQ	13	45
17	(United States) Caden Dudney	Yamaha	13	11	17	13	18	16					44
18	(United States) Cullin Park	Honda	9	8	9	Ret							40
19	(United States) Landen Gordon	Yamaha							22	2	21	9	36
20	(United States) Izaih Clark	Honda	DNQ	12	13	DNQ	DNQ	DNQ	21	10	Ret		32
21	(United States) Jeremy Hand	Honda	14	18	DNQ		15		20 (Note: Hand was docked five points following the thirteenth round for jumping on a red cross flag.)	19	11		30
22	(United States) Jalek Swoll	Triumph	21	10	8	DNQ							27
23	(United States) Landon Hartz	Yamaha	DNQ	16	DNQ	DNQ	Ret		11	DNQ	13		26
24	(United States) Drew Adams	Kawasaki	6	Ret					10 (Note: Adams was docked five points following the thirteenth round for jumping on a red cross flag.)	20			25
25	(United States) Bryton Carroll	Yamaha	19	DNQ	DNQ		DNQ		DNQ	DNQ	12		13
26	(United States) John Short IV	Honda	18	19	DNQ		DNQ		DNQ	16	DNQ		13
27	(United States) Evan Ferry	Honda	DNQ	21	20	DNQ (Note: Ferry was docked five points following the tenth round for aggressive riding.)	11	DNQ					9
28	(United States) Luca Marsalisi	Triumph	DNQ	DNQ	DNQ	DNQ	16	DNQ	DNQ	22	19		9
29	(Switzerland) Valentin Guillod	Yamaha	DNQ	14	22	DNQ			DNQ	DNQ			8
30	(South Africa) Marcus Phelps	KTM	DNQ	DNQ	DNQ	DNQ	DNQ	DNQ	14 (Note: Phelps was docked five points following the thirteenth round for jumping on a red cross flag.)	18	DNQ	DNQ	7
31	(United States) Leum Oehlhof	Kawasaki			15								7
32	(United States) CJ Benard	Yamaha	DNQ	DNQ	21	DNQ	17	DNQ	DNQ	21	DNQ	DNQ	7
33	(United States) Ryder Floyd	Honda	DNQ	DNQ	DNQ	DNQ	DNQ	DNQ	16 (Note: Floyd was docked five points following the thirteenth round for jumping on a red cross flag.)	DNQ	17		6
34	(United States) Hamden Hudson	Kawasaki	DNQ	DNQ	DNQ	DNQ	DNQ	DNQ	DNQ	DNQ	16		6
35	(United States) Jace Kessler	KTM	DNQ	DNQ	DNQ	DNQ	DNQ	DNQ	18	DNQ	DNQ	DNQ	4
36	(United States) Russell Buccheri	KTM	DNQ	DNQ	DNQ	DNQ	DNQ	DNQ	DNQ	DNQ	18		4
37	(United States) Bryce Shelly	Yamaha	20	DNQ	DNQ								2
38	(United States) Jonathan Getz	Husqvarna	DNQ	DNQ	DNQ	DNQ	DNQ		DNQ		20		2
39	(United States) Casey Cochran	Husqvarna					20						2
	(United States) Carter Malcolm	Yamaha	DNQ	DNQ	DNQ	DNQ	DNQ	DNQ	DNQ	DNQ	DNQ		0
	(United States) Hayes Edwards	Yamaha	DNQ	DNQ	DNQ	DNQ	DNQ		DNQ	DNQ	DNQ	DNQ	0
	(United States) Brayden Ehlermann	Gas Gas		DNQ	DNQ	DNQ	DNQ	DNQ	DNQ	DNQ	DNQ	DNQ	0
	(United States) Collin Allen	Yamaha	DNQ	DNQ	DNQ		DNQ		DNQ	DNQ	DNQ		0
	(United States) Logan Riggins	Husqvarna	DNQ	DNQ	DNQ		DNQ		DNQ	DNQ	DNQ		0
	(United States) Gage Stine	Yamaha	DNQ	DNQ	DNQ		DNQ		DNQ		DNQ		0
	(United States) David Pulley	Yamaha	DNQ	DNQ			DNQ		DNQ	DNQ		DNQ	0
	(United States) Doc Smith	Suzuki	DNQ	DNQ			DNQ		DNQ		DNQ		0
	(Canada) Noah Viney	Kawasaki	DNQ	DNQ	DNQ	DNQ							0
	(United States) Ashton Arruda	Kawasaki	DNQ	DNQ	DNQ						DNQ		0
	(United States) Carter Biese	Kawasaki		DNQ			DNQ		DNQ		DNQ		0
	(United States) Addison Emory IV	Yamaha							DNQ	DNQ	DNQ	DNQ	0
	(United States) Vinny Luhovey	Kawasaki	DNQ	DNQ	DNQ								0
	(United States) Tony Usko	KTM	DNQ	DNQ	DNQ								0
	(United States) Riley Ripper	Husqvarna	DNQ	DNQ				DNQ					0
	(United States) Jaxen Driskell	KTM	DNQ								DNQ	DNQ	0
	(United States) Christopher Blackmer	Yamaha		DNQ			DNQ		DNQ				0
	(United States) Bryson Raymond	Gas Gas		DNQ					DNQ		DNQ		0
	(United States) Aidan Dickens	Yamaha	DNQ	DNQ									0
	(United States) Evan Stice	Yamaha	DNQ	DNQ									0
	(United States) Jack Rogers	Kawasaki		DNQ	DNQ								0
	(United States) Carter Stephenson	Kawasaki		DNQ					DNQ				0
	(United States) Trevor Hazlett	Kawasaki					DNQ			DNQ			0
	(United States) Eddie Norred	Kawasaki							DNQ	DNQ			0
	(United States) RJ Johnson	KTM							DNQ		DNQ		0
	(Chile) Hardy Muñoz	Yamaha	DNQ										0
	(United States) Kyler Hawkey	Yamaha	DNQ										0
Pos	Rider	Bike	ARL (Texas)	DAY (Florida)	IND (Indiana)	BIR (Alabama)	DET (Michigan)	STL (Missouri)	NAS (Tennessee)	CLE (Ohio)	PHI (Pennsylvania)	SLC (Utah)	Points
