= 2025 FIM Supercross World Championship =

2025 Supercross World Championship season

The 2025 FIM Supercross World Championship was a supercross series sanctioned by the Fédération Internationale de Motocyclisme (FIM) as the world championship of the sport. This was the fourth season organized by Australian promoter SX Global.

Eli Tomac was the reigning champion in the WSX class for 450cc motorcycles, whilst Shane McElrath was the reigning champion in the SX2 class.

Prior to the start of the season, the series organisers announced that all licensed teams had signed the 'Geneva Agreement'. Along with setting out how the championship would support licensed teams for the following three seasons, Stark Future was announced as a new team in the series. Stark Future will be the first team to run electric-powered motorcycles in the series.

== Format Changes ==
The SuperFinal brought in for the previous season was discontinued, with each class having three separate races to contribute to the final classification. The shorter first two races awarded points for the top-ten finishers, with the longer final race awarding points to the top-twenty finishers.

Points were no longer awarded for the SuperPole session.

A new classification was introduced for teams.

== Calendar and results ==
The 2025 season is scheduled to have 5 events on 5 different continents.

Round	Date	Grand Prix	Location	Stadium	WSX Winner	SX2 Winner
1	8 November	(Argentina) Buenos Aires City Grand Prix	Buenos Aires	Autódromo Oscar y Juan Gálvez	(Germany) Ken Roczen	(United Kingdom) Max Anstie
2	15 November	(Canada) Canadian Grand Prix	Vancouver	BC Place	(United States) Eli Tomac	(United Kingdom) Max Anstie
3	29 November	Australia Grand Prix	Gold Coast	Cbus Super Stadium	(Germany) Ken Roczen	(United Kingdom) Max Anstie
4	6 December	(Sweden) Swedish Grand Prix	Stockholm	3Arena	(United States) Jason Anderson	(United Kingdom) Max Anstie
5	13 December	(South Africa) South African Grand Prix	Cape Town	DHL Stadium	(United States) Jason Anderson	(United States) Shane McElrath

== WSX ==
=== Entry list ===
Licensed Teams & Riders
Team	Constructor	No	Rider	Rounds
(France) Venum BUD Racing	Kawasaki	4	(Australia) Luke Clout	4–5
(France) Venum BUD Racing	Kawasaki	46	(United States) Justin Hill	1–3
(France) Venum BUD Racing	Kawasaki	102	(Australia) Matt Moss	1–3
(France) Venum BUD Racing	Kawasaki	319	(Spain) Ander Valentín	4
Quadlock Honda Racing Australia	Honda	17	(United States) Joey Savatgy	All
Quadlock Honda Racing Australia	Honda	28	(United States) Christian Craig	All
(France) Team GSM HBI with Star Racing Yamaha	Yamaha	20	(France) Greg Aranda	1–4
(France) Team GSM HBI with Star Racing Yamaha	Yamaha	319	(Spain) Ander Valentín	5
(France) Team GSM HBI with Star Racing Yamaha	Yamaha	911	(France) Jordi Tixier	All
(United States) Progressive ECSTAR PMG	Suzuki	21	(United States) Jason Anderson	All
(United States) Progressive ECSTAR PMG	Suzuki	45	(United States) Colt Nichols	4–5
(United States) Progressive ECSTAR PMG	Suzuki	94	(Germany) Ken Roczen	1–3
(United States) Arby's Rick Ware Racing MX	Yamaha	29	(United States) Henry Miller	All
(United States) Arby's Rick Ware Racing MX	Yamaha	88	(United States) Devin Simonson	All
(United States) MotoConcepts Racing	Honda	98	(United States) Austin Politelli	All
(United States) MotoConcepts Racing	Honda	200	(United States) Ryan Breece	All
(Spain) Stark Future	Stark	99	(Spain) Jorge Zaragoza	All
(Spain) Stark Future	Stark	719	(United States) Vince Friese	All
Wildcard Teams & Riders
(United States) Red Bull KTM Factory Racing	KTM	1	(United States) Eli Tomac	2–3
(United States) Monster Energy Yamaha Star Racing	Yamaha	2	(United States) Cooper Webb	3
(United States) Monster Energy Yamaha Star Racing	Yamaha	32	(United States) Justin Cooper	1–2
(United States) Monster Energy Yamaha Star Racing	Yamaha	38	(United States) Haiden Deegan	1, 3
Red Bull KTM South Africa	KTM	584	(South Africa) Cameron Durow	5

==== Riders Championship ====
Points are awarded to the top-ten finishers of the first two races, in the following format:

Position	1st	2nd	3rd	4th	5th	6th	7th	8th	9th	10th
Points	10	9	8	7	6	5	4	3	2	1

Points are awarded to the top-twenty finishers of the third race, in the following format:

Position	1st	2nd	3rd	4th	5th	6th	7th	8th	9th	10th	11th	12th	13th	14th	15th	16th	17th	18th	19th	20th
Points	25	22	20	18	16	15	14	13	12	11	10	9	8	7	6	5	4	3	2	1

Pos	Nr	Rider	Bike	ARG (Argentina)			CAN (Canada)			AUS (Australia)			SWE (Sweden)			RSA (South Africa)			Points
1	21	(United States) Jason Anderson	Suzuki	7	3	4	2	3	4	8	2	16	2	1	1	1	1	1	171
2	17	(United States) Joey Savatgy	Honda	3	4	8	6	4	6	5	3	5	1	2	2	2	2	2	166
3	28	(United States) Christian Craig	Honda	2	5	5	4	5	5	3	9	1	3	4	3	5	8	3	154
4	94	(Germany) Ken Roczen	Suzuki	1	1	1	3	1	2	1	4	3							122
5	29	(United States) Henry Miller	Yamaha	13	14	10	7	10	7	14	12	11	4	Ret	4	8	5	7	88
6	98	(United States) Austin Politelli	Honda	6	10	15	Ret	6	8	9	6	15	7	12	6	Ret	9	5	80
7	200	(United States) Ryan Breece	Honda	11	11	7	12	14	14	10	5	10	6	9	8	7	11	10	74
8	88	(United States) Devin Simonson	Yamaha	15	7	6	14	12	DSQ	13	14	13	11	8	5	6	7	6	70
9	911	(France) Jordi Tixier	Yamaha	14	12	13	11	8	13	7	8	14	12	5	7	9	Ret	11	65
10	99	(Spain) Jorge Zaragoza	Stark	10	Ret	14	9	11	9	15	13	12	10	10	11	10	3	12	61
11	45	(United States) Colt Nichols	Suzuki										5	3	13	3	6	4	53
12	719	(United States) Vince Friese	Stark	16	Ret	DNS	10	13	12	12	10	8	9	7	10	11	10	9	49
13	20	(France) Greg Aranda	Yamaha	9	13	9	8	7	10	Ret	Ret	7	Ret	DNS	DNS				46
14	46	(United States) Justin Hill	Kawasaki	12	8	11	13	9	11	11	11	9							37
15	4	(Australia) Luke Clout	Kawasaki										13	11	12	4	4	8	36
16	319	(Spain) Ander Valentín	Kawasaki										8	6	9				20
16	319	(Spain) Ander Valentín	Yamaha													DNS	DNS	DNS	20
17	102	(Australia) Matt Moss	Kawasaki	8	9	12	DNS	DNS	DNS	Ret	DNS	DNS				DNS	DNS	DNS	14
Wildcard riders ineligible for championship points
	1	(United States) Eli Tomac	KTM				1	2	1	2	7	4							
	32	(United States) Justin Cooper	Yamaha	5	2	2	5	15	3										
	38	(United States) Haiden Deegan	Yamaha	4	6	3				6	Ret	2							
	2	(United States) Cooper Webb	Yamaha							4	1	6							
	584	(South Africa) Cameron Durow	KTM													12	12	13	
Pos	Nr	Rider	Bike	ARG (Argentina)			CAN (Canada)			AUS (Australia)			SWE (Sweden)			RSA (South Africa)			Points

== SX2 ==
=== Entry list ===
Licensed Teams & Riders
Team	Constructor	No	Rider	Rounds
Quadlock Honda Racing Australia	Honda	1	(United States) Shane McElrath	All
Quadlock Honda Racing Australia	Honda	5	(Australia) Alex Larwood	4
Quadlock Honda Racing Australia	Honda	20	(Australia) Wilson Todd	2
Quadlock Honda Racing Australia	Honda	100	(France) Anthony Bourdon	1, 3, 5
(France) Venum BUD Racing Kawasaki	Kawasaki	2	(Canada) Cole Thompson	All
(France) Venum BUD Racing Kawasaki	Kawasaki	110	(United States) Kyle Peters	All
(United States) Progressive ECSTAR PMG	Suzuki	11	(United States) Kyle Chisholm	All
(United States) Progressive ECSTAR PMG	Suzuki	64	(United States) Robbie Wageman	All
(United States) Arby's Rick Ware Racing MX	Yamaha	16	(Brazil) Enzo Lopes	All
(United States) Arby's Rick Ware Racing MX	Yamaha	69	(United States) Coty Schock	All
(United States) MotoConcepts Racing	Honda	39	(Canada) Noah Viney	All
(United States) MotoConcepts Racing	Honda	43	(United States) Cullin Park	All
(Spain) Stark Future	Stark	62	(United States) Kelana Humphrey	3–5
(Spain) Stark Future	Stark	95	(United States) Lance Kobusch	1–2
(Spain) Stark Future	Stark	460	(United States) Michael Hicks	All
(France) Team GSM HBI with Star Racing Yamaha	Yamaha	99	(United Kingdom) Max Anstie	All
(France) Team GSM HBI with Star Racing Yamaha	Yamaha	141	(France) Maxime Desprey	All
Wildcard Teams & Riders
(Australia) QB4 Bikes & 4WD/Carwash Express	Kawasaki	41	(Australia) Kaleb Barham	3

==== Riders Championship ====
Points are awarded to the top-ten finishers of the first two races, in the following format:

Position	1st	2nd	3rd	4th	5th	6th	7th	8th	9th	10th
Points	10	9	8	7	6	5	4	3	2	1

Points are awarded to the top-twenty finishers of the third race, in the following format:

Position	1st	2nd	3rd	4th	5th	6th	7th	8th	9th	10th	11th	12th	13th	14th	15th	16th	17th	18th	19th	20th
Points	25	22	20	18	16	15	14	13	12	11	10	9	8	7	6	5	4	3	2	1

Pos	Nr	Rider	Bike	ARG (Argentina)			CAN (Canada)			AUS (Australia)			SWE (Sweden)			RSA (South Africa)			Points
1	99	(United Kingdom) Max Anstie	Yamaha	1	1	1	1	1	1	1	1	1	1	1	3	2	2	2	215
2	1	(United States) Shane McElrath	Honda	3	2	3	7	8	6	5	3	2	2	6	2	1	1	1	176
3	69	(United States) Coty Schock	Yamaha	5	5	2	2	2	2	3	4	4	3	4	9	5	4	3	167
4	43	(United States) Cullin Park	Honda	2	10	8	5	4	4	4	2	3	5	5	8	3	6	5	144
5	16	(Brazil) Enzo Lopes	Yamaha	9	3	5	3	3	3	2	Ret	15	8	2	1	4	3	14	136
6	2	(Canada) Cole Thompson	Kawasaki	4	4	4	4	6	8	7	6	7	6	9	10	8	7	6	120
7	460	(United States) Michael Hicks	Stark	10	9	7	6	7	7	8	5	13	4	3	4	9	8	4	113
8	110	(United States) Kyle Peters	Kawasaki	6	7	6	8	5	5	10	8	5	11	12	12	6	5	7	103
9	141	(France) Maxime Desprey	Yamaha	8	6	11	9	14	11	6	11	6	7	11	6	7	14	13	81
10	64	(United States) Robbie Wageman	Suzuki	13	13	13	Ret	11	9	11	12	10	9	8	5	13	10	9	65
11	11	(United States) Kyle Chisholm	Suzuki	11	8	9	10	9	14	9	7	9	13	13	13	11	11	8	64
12	39	(Canada) Noah Viney	Honda	14	14	14	13	12	13	14	13	11	14	14	14	14	13	12	41
13	100	(France) Anthony Bourdon	Honda	7	11	10				12	9	8				12	12	11	40
14	62	(United States) Kelana Humphrey	Stark							15	10	14	12	10	11	10	9	10	33
15	95	(United States) Lance Kobusch	Stark	12	12	12	11	13	10										20
16	5	(Australia) Alex Larwood	Honda										10	7	7				19
17	20	(Australia) Wilson Todd	Honda				12	10	12										10
Wildcard riders ineligible for championship points
	41	(Australia) Kaleb Barham	Kawasaki							13	Ret	12							
Pos	Nr	Rider	Bike	ARG (Argentina)			CAN (Canada)			AUS (Australia)			SWE (Sweden)			RSA (South Africa)			Points

== Teams Championship ==
Pos	Team	ARG (Argentina)	CAN (Canada)	AUS (Australia)	SWE (Sweden)	RSA (South Africa)	Points
1	(Australia) Quadlock Honda	111	88	116	131	124	565
2	(United States) Pipes Motorsports Group	98	97	83	95	102	475
3	(United States) Rick Ware Racing	90	95	66	108	102	461
4	(France) Team GSM	85	86	93	79	64	407
5	(United States) MotoConcepts Racing	56	64	77	71	71	339
6	(France) Venum BUD Racing	83	62	55	56	74	330
7	(Spain) Stark Future	34	53	48	73	68	276
Pos	Team	ARG (Argentina)	CAN (Canada)	AUS (Australia)	SWE (Sweden)	RSA (South Africa)	Points
