= Dean Wilson =

Dean Wilson may refer to:

- Dean Wilson (golfer)
- Dean Wilson (motorcyclist)
