= Max Anstie =

British motocross racer (born 1993)

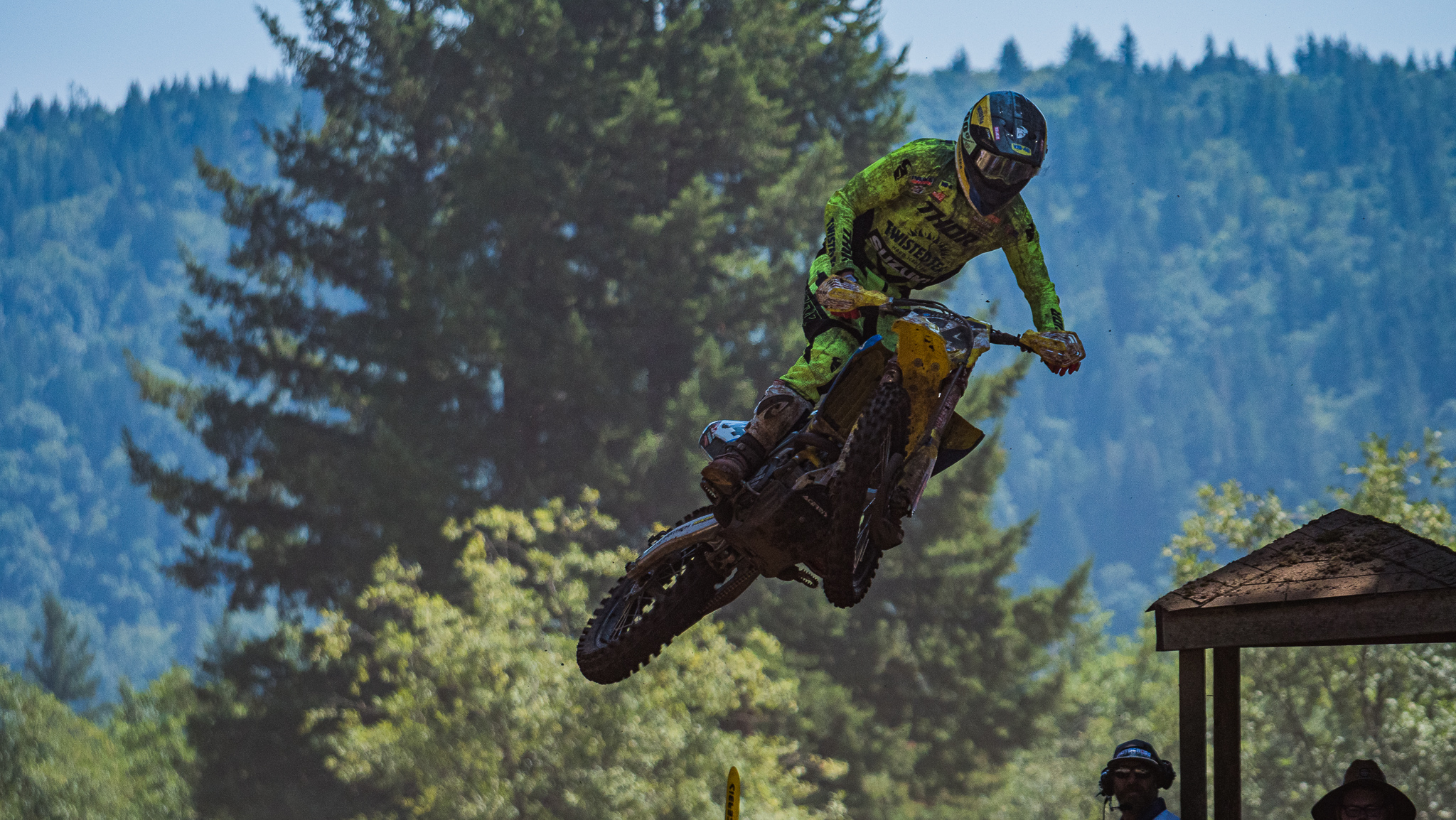
- Anstie in 2021
- Nationality: British
- Born: 25 April 1993 (age 33) Newbury

Motocross career
- Years active: 2010–present
- Teams: •FirePower Honda (2022-2024); •Monster Energy Yamaha Star Racing (2024-2026); •ClubMX Yamaha (2026-Present)
- Championships: •2022 Australian SX2; •2023 Australian SX2; •2023 SX2 World Supercross; •2025 SX2 World Supercross
- Wins: •MX2: 6; •250cc AMA Supercross: 4

Max Anstie (born 25 April 1993) is a British professional motocross and Supercross racer. Anstie is a two time FIM Supercross World Champion in 2023 and 2025 in the SX2 class. He is a two-time Australian Supercross champion in the SX2 class.

Anstie has competed extensively in both the FIM Motocross World Championship, as well as the American-based AMA Supercross Championship and AMA Motocross Championship. He is a six time grand prix winner in the MX2 class of the FIM Motocross World Championship, with his best championship position being third overall in 2015.

Anstie has represented his country at the Motocross des Nations on several occasions, the most notable being the 2017 edition of the event, where he helped Great Britain finish third by taking two race wins and being the best overall individual rider in the event.

Anstie's father, Mervyn, was also a world championship-level professional motocross racer.

== Career ==
=== Junior career ===
Anstie competed internationally throughout his junior career, first competing in the FIM Motocross Junior World Championship in 2006 (in the 85cc class), finishing sixth overall. The following year, Anstie was able to finish in the runner-up spot in the same class, with two-second places behind champion Ken Roczen. At the 2008 edition of the event, he was able to win the opening race in the 85cc class, but did not finish the second race, to finish seventh overall with Jeffrey Herlings as the winner.

=== Move to America ===
In 2009, Anstie made his professional motocross debut in the 250 class of the AMA Motocross Championship, riding a KTM. Riding in the first eight rounds of the championship he was able to record a best finish of sixth in race two at Red Bud. This effort was enough for Anstie to be signed by the DNA Shred Stix Star Racing Yamaha team for 2010, where he would make his professional supercross debut. Competing in the Lites West class, he recorded several top ten finished, including a fourth in San Diego.

=== World Championship career ===
Following his results in America, Anstie was able to sign for the Team CLS Monster Energy Kawasaki Pro Circuit team in the MX2 class of the FIM Motocross World Championship in 2011. Anstie was immediately a factor in the MX2 class, placing in the top ten consistently and finishing third in the first race at the American round. He would come close to the overall podium several times throughout the year, before taking his first grand prix podium at the final round of the season in Italy. After sixth in the final standings, Anstie moved to the Honda Gariboldi team for 2012 As part of this deal, Anstie would race the first five rounds of the Lites West class in the AMA Supercross Championship in America for 2012. A best place of sixth in Los Angeles, combined with missing the final three rounds, left him 16th in the championship standings. Anstie would again have a consistent season in the MX2 class of the FIM Motocross World Championship finishing seventh in the final standings, picking up his second overall podium at Lierop in The Netherlands. He finished the year by making his debut for Great Britain at the Motocross des Nations at Lommel in Belgium. Anstie helped Great Britain finish eighth overall, with himself finishing sixth individually in the Open class.

For 2013, Anstie was signed by Suzuki's factory team in the MX2 class of the 2013 FIM Motocross World Championship. Once again, alongside this, Anstie competed in the opening rounds of that years AMA Supercross Championship in the Lites West class – at this point renamed to 250SX West. In the world championship, Anstie was not able to land on the overall podium during the season, but did pick up two third place race finishes. Anstie was on the move again in 2014, joining the BikeIT Yamaha Cosworth team, focussing on the MX2 class of the 2014 FIM Motocross World Championship. He showed an immediate improvement, running at the front of the first few rounds and picking up two overall podiums in a row at rounds two and three. Later in the season, at Lommel, Anstie was able to pick up his first race win en route to his first overall grand prix victory.

Anstie stayed with the same team for the 2015 FIM Motocross World Championship, which moved to Kawasaki. This proved to be his most successful season to date, finishing third overall in the championship behinds Tim Gajser and Pauls Jonass. Included within this was three grand prix wins and nine race wins as part of that. On the back of this, Anstie was selected to make his second start for Great Britain at the 2015 Motocross des Nations. Unfortunately, an injury sustained in the Saturday qualifying race ended his weekend. For the 2016 FIM Motocross World Championship, Anstie changed teams again, to return to being a factory rider – this time for Husqvarna. In what turned out to be a dominant season for champion Jeffrey Herlings, Anstie was able to pick up two more grand prix victories and finish in fourth in the final standings.

Anstie was retained by factory Husqvarna in 2017, but had to step up to the MXGP class for the 2017 FIM Motocross World Championship. Despite picking up a knee injury and missing two rounds, Anstie was able to pick up three overall podiums in his debut MXGP season on his way to ninth in the final standings. Once again selected to race for Great Britain at the Motocross des Nations, Anstie had a stand out weekend, winning both of his races to help his nation get its first podium since 1997. Despite an injury in the early part of the season, Anstie was able to pick up a further three overall podiums on the way to tenth in the MXGP standings of the 2018 FIM Motocross World Championship. This was coupled with another third overall as part of team Great Britain at the 2018 Motocross des Nations. In 2019, Anstie moved away from Husqvarna to the Standing Construct KTM team for MXGP. In a season shortened by injury, he was able to take his first and to date only race win in the MXGP class in Lommel. He missed out on the overall win or podium at the same round due to a crash in the opening race that caused a damaged lung. He was able to ride with this injury to win the second race, but could not compete in the remaining rounds of the year.

=== Return to America & World Supercross ===
Struggling to find a ride in the world championship paddock, Anstie opted to return to America for the 2020 to compete in the AMA Supercross and AMA Motocross Championships. Signing for the HEP Motorsports Suzuki team, an injury would rule him out of the entire supercross season. In the COVID-19 shortened AMA Motocross season, Anstie would finish ninth in the final standings, grabbing a third place in race two at the second round after leading much of it. He remained with the same team for 2021, but had injury problems again that ruled him out of the first part of the 2021 AMA Supercross Championship.

For 2022, Anstie signed for the Rocky Mountain ATV/MC WPS KTM team. However, when the team lost its title sponsor mid-way through the supercross season, Anstie was left without a ride. Later in the year, Anstie signed for the Australian Fire Power Honda team. He made his debut for the team in the 450 class in the AMA Motocross Championship but his main focus of the year would be the Motocross des Nations and the 2022 FIM Supercross World Championship, dropping down to the 250 for both. The 2022 Motocross des Nations would be a tough event for both Anstie and the Great Britain team, with them finishing tenth overall. In world supercross, Anstie was able to finish second overall behind Shane McElrath, winning two races in the series along the way. This was followed up by him becoming Australian Supercross Champion in the 250 class.

Anstie would start in the 250SX East class of the 2023 AMA Supercross Championship, recording his best AMA supercross season to date. A final finishing position of third in the class was accompanied by his first ever AMA Supercross main event win, in the wet at the MetLife Stadium. Focussing solely on Supercross in 2023, Anstie next competed in the opening round of the 2023 FIM Supercross World Championship, finishing second overall and winning race two. He took the championship lead at the following round after winning two of the three races and dominated the final round in Australia, taking a clean sweep of race wins to become the World Champion in the SX2 class. This was the first time a British rider had won an FIM sanctioned world title in the sport of supercross. In addition, Anstie was able to successfully defend his Australian Supercross Championship crown in the SX2 class. He started the 2024 AMA Supercross Championship with a second place finish at the opening 250SX East round in Detroit. Anstie continued to show he was one of the fastest riders in the class throughout the season, culminating in him taking his second professional supercross win at the penultimate round of the year in Philadelphia. In June of 2024, Anstie departed the Fire Power Honda team and joined Monster Energy Star Racing Yamaha team on a multi-year deal. This saw him return to the same team he had made his professional debut with fourteen years previous. As part of this he rode in the last seven rounds of the 2024 AMA National Motocross Championship for the team, scoring two individual third place race finishes in this time. After these results, he competed for his country at the 2024 Motocross des Nations in the MX2 class. Showing his pace, he finished fourth in his qualifying race but a crash in the first race saw him not finish and miss the rest of the event.

Starting in the 250SX East class, Anstie was able to win the opening round of the 2025 AMA Supercross Championship. At the following round, he led most of the main event, before a red flag caused a staggered restart with only seconds left of the race. After being passed by Levi Kitchen at the restart, he finished second but stayed as championship leader. A qualifying crash at the fifth round saw Anstie sustain a broken fibula, ruling him out for the rest of the championship. Missing the entire 2025 AMA National Motocross Championship season, he returned for the 2025 SuperMotocross playoff rounds, finishing fifteenth in the final standings. After his injury-troubled season in America, Anstie returned to a full campaign in the 2025 FIM Supercross World Championship, later in the year. Competing in the SX2 class he won in 2023, Anstie dominated the opening three rounds, winning all three races at each event. Despite losing his perfect record at the final two rounds, he was still able to take his second FIM Supercross World Championship with a comfortable margin.

Anstie carried his good form into the opening round of the 2026 AMA Supercross Championship, where he took the win in the 250SX West class at Anaheim. He faced challenges throughout the rest of the season, including needing to have his appendix removed shortly after finishing third at the sixth round. A further third place came at the final round and his results were consistent enough for Anstie to finish third in the final standings. After picking up an injury at the first round of the 2026 AMA National Motocross Championship, Anstie left the Star Yamaha team mid-season to join the ClubMX Yamaha squad on a two-year deal. Making his debut for the team in the playoff rounds of the 2026 SuperMotocross World Championship, Anstie finished nineteenth in the standings, after not qualifying at the first round. Alongside this, Anstie competed and took a clean sweep win at the opening round of the 2026 FIM Supercross World Championship in Canada. However, due to financial issues for the series promoters, the rest of the championship was cancelled after the opening round.

== Honours ==
Motocross des Nations

- Team Overall: 2017 (United Kingdom) (bronze)

FIM Motocross World Championship

- MX2: 2015 (bronze)

FIM Supercross World Championship

- SX2: 2023 & 2025 (gold) , 2022 (silver)

FIM Junior Motocross World Championship

- 85cc: 2007 (silver)

AMA Supercross Championship

- 250SX West: 2026 (bronze)
- 250SX East: 2023 (bronze)

Australian Supercross Championship

- SX2: 2022 & 2023 (gold)

== Career statistics ==
=== Motocross des Nations ===
Year	Location	Nation	Class	Teammates	Team Overall	Individual Overall
2012	(Belgium) Lommel	GBR	Open	Tommy Searle; Jake Nicholls	8th	6th
2015	(France) Ernée	GBR	MX2	Shaun Simpson; Dean Wilson	18th	N/A
2016	(Italy) Maggiora	GBR	MX2	Tommy Searle; Shaun Simpson	7th	10th
2017	(United Kingdom) Matterley Basin	GBR	MXGP	Tommy Searle; Dean Wilson	3rd	1st
2018	(United States) Red Bud	GBR	Open	Tommy Searle; Ben Watson	3rd	3rd
2022	(United States) Red Bud	GBR	MX2	Dean Wilson; Tommy Searle	10th	17th
2024	(United Kingdom) Matterley Basin	GBR	MX2	Tommy Searle; Conrad Mewse	12th	20th

=== FIM Motocross World Championship ===
==== By season ====
Season	Class	Number	Motorcycle	Team	Race	Race Wins	Overall Wins	Race Top-3	Overall Podium	Pts	Plcd
2011	MX2	99	Kawasaki	Team CLS Monster Energy Kawasaki Pro Circuit	29	0	0	1	1	405	6th
2012	MX2	6	Honda	Honda Gariboldi	32	0	0	3	1	333	7th
2013	MX2	14	Suzuki	Rockstar Energy Suzuki Europe	33	0	0	2	0	320	10th
2014	MX2	99	Yamaha	BikeIT Yamaha Cosworth	33	1	1	4	3	283	12th
2015	MX2	99	Kawasaki	Monster Energy DRT Kawasaki	34	9	3	14	5	537	3rd
2016	MX2	99	Husqvarna	Rockstar Energy Husqvarna Factory Racing	36	4	2	13	4	504	4th
2017	MXGP	99	Husqvarna	Rockstar Energy Husqvarna Factory Racing	33	0	0	5	3	436	9th
2018	MXGP	99	Husqvarna	Rockstar Energy Husqvarna Factory Racing	34	0	0	2	3	386	10th
2019	MXGP	99	KTM	Standing Construct KTM	25	1	0	2	0	256	12th
Total					289	15	6	46	20	3460	

==== Grand Prix wins ====
GP wins
GP-win count	Date	Grand Prix	Place
MX2-class
1	3 August 2014	Belgium	Lommel
2	12 July 2015	Latvia	Ķegums
3	2 August 2015	Belgium	Lommel
4	16 August 2015	Italy	Mantova
5	31 July 2016	Belgium	Lommel
6	7 August 2016	Switzerland	Frauenfeld

=== FIM Supercross World Championship ===
==== By season ====
Season	Class	Number	Motorcycle	Team	Overall Wins	Overall Podium	Pts	Plcd
2022	SX2	99	Honda	Honda Genuine Honda Racing	0	1	114	2nd
2023	SX2	99	Honda	Fire Power Honda Racing	2	3	216	1st
2024	SX2	1	Yamaha	Monster Energy CDR Yamaha Star Racing	0	1	79	15th
2025	SX2	99	Yamaha	Team GSM with Star Racing Yamaha	4	5	215	1st
2026	SX2	1	Yamaha	Rocket Doctor/Rick Ware Racing	1	1	45	1st (Note: Series cancelled after opening round)

=== AMA Supercross Championship ===
==== By season ====
Season	Class	Number	Motorcycle	Team	Overall Wins	Overall Podium	Pts	Plcd
2010	Lites West	48	Yamaha	DNA Shred Stix Star Racing Yamaha	0	0	82	9th
2012	Lites West	119	Honda	Honda Gariboldi	0	0	53	16th
2013	250SX West	74	Suzuki	Rockstar Energy Suzuki Europe	0	0	38	16th
2021	450SX	34	Suzuki	Twisted Tea Suzuki	0	0	76	21st
2022	450SX	34	KTM	Rocky Mountain ATV/MC WPS KTM	0	0	55	24th
2023	250SX East	63	Honda	Fire Power Honda Racing	1	4	182	3rd
2024	250SX East	37	Honda	Fire Power Honda Racing	1	2	125	5th
2025	250SX East	31	Yamaha	Monster Energy Yamaha Star Racing	1	2	78	9th
2026	250SX West	61	Yamaha	Monster Energy Yamaha Star Racing	1	3	168	3rd
Total					4	11	857	

=== AMA National Motocross Championship ===
==== By season ====
Season	Class	Number	Motorcycle	Team	Races	Race Wins	Overall Wins	Race Top-3	Overall Podium	Pts	Plcd
2009	250	119	KTM		16	0	0	0	0	107	18th
2010	250	48	Yamaha	DNA Shred Stix Star Racing Yamaha	16	0	0	0	0	72	20th
2020	450	103	Suzuki	HEP Motorsports Suzuki	18	0	0	1	0	193	9th
2021	450	34	Suzuki	Twisted Tea Suzuki	22	0	0	0	0	208	11th
2022	450	34	Honda	Fire Power Honda	5	0	0	0	0	45	22nd
2024	250	37	Yamaha	Monster Energy Star Racing Yamaha	13	0	0	2	0	145	15th
2026	250	61	Yamaha	Monster Energy Star Racing Yamaha	1	0	0	0	0	0	N/A
Total					91	0	0	3	0	770	

== AMA Supercross/Motocross Results ==
Year	Rnd 1	Rnd 2	Rnd 3	Rnd 4	Rnd 5	Rnd 6	Rnd 7	Rnd 8	Rnd 9	Rnd 10	Rnd 11	Rnd 12	Rnd 13	Rnd 14	Rnd 15	Rnd 16	Rnd 17	Average Finish	Podium Percent	Place
2023 250 SX-E	-	-	-	-	2	3	5	2	5	DNF	-	-	5	1	5	-	7	3.89	44%	3rd
2024 250 SX-E	-	-	-	-	2	-	6	8	DNF	13	-	-	5	7	1	-	16	7.25	25%	5th
2024 250 MX	OUT	OUT	OUT	OUT	13	9	4	13	5	DNF	8	-	-	-	-	-	-	8.67	-	15th
2025 250 SX-E	-	-	-	-	1	2	-	6	7	OUT	-	OUT	OUT	OUT	OUT	-	OUT	4.00	50%	9th
2025 250 MX	OUT	OUT	OUT	OUT	OUT	OUT	OUT	OUT	OUT	OUT	OUT	-	-	-	-	-	-	-	-	-
‘2026 250 SX-W	1 ANA (California)	5 SDI (California)	6 ANA (California)	6 HOU (Texas)	8 GLE (Arizona)	3 SEA (Washington (state))	-	-	-	7 BIR (Alabama)	-	15 STL (Missouri)	-	-	-	4 DEN (Colorado)	3 SLC (Utah)	5.80	30%	3rd
2026 250 MX	DNF FOX (California)	HAN (California)	THU (Colorado)	HIG (Pennsylvania)	RED (Michigan)	SOU (Massachusetts)	SPR (Minnesota)	WAS (Washington (state))	UNA (New York (state))	BUD (Maryland)	IRN (Indiana)	-	-	-	-	-	-			
