= Justin Hill (motorcyclist) =

American motocross racer (born 1995)

- Nationality: American
- Born: 7 May 1995 (age 31); Yoncalla, Oregon, U.S.
- Current team: Team Tedder Monster Energy KTM
- Bike number: 46

Justin Hill (born 7 May 1995) is an American professional motocross and Supercross racer. Hill was the 2017 AMA Supercross Champion in the 250SX West class.

Alongside his 2017 championship victory, Hill has eight individual supercross wins to his name, all from when rode in the 250SX classes.

From the end of the 2020 AMA Supercross Championship to the beginning of the 2023 AMA Supercross Championship, Hill did not race professionally. Since his comeback, he has achieved one podium in the 450SX class.

Hill is the younger brother of Josh Hill, who has also raced at professional level in motocross and Supercross.

== Career ==
=== Junior career ===
Hill progressed through the ranks of the American amateur system, following his older brother in racing the AMA Amateur National Motocross Championship. After three podiums and several other top-ten results through the previous editions, Hill was able to win the 250B Stock title in his final year competing at Loretta Lynn's in 2011.

=== 250 Career ===
Hill was signed by the Monster Energy Pro Circuit Kawasaki team to make his professional debut in the 2013 AMA Supercross season. Preparation for his first supercross season as a professional was hampered by a broken hand. Starting in the 250SX East class, Hill finished fifth on his debut and recording three further top-six finishes over the following four rounds. At the Toronto round, Hill was landed on by another rider, resulting in a fractured radius and the end of his supercross season. Returning for the 2013 AMA National Motocross Championship, he competed in all the rounds of the championship, scoring a best result of fifth overall at the eighth round and finishing twelfth in the final standings. After an injury free winter, Hill started the 2014 AMA Supercross Championship in the 250SX West class, scoring his first professional podium at the third round in Oakland. Two weeks later, Hill would go on to take his first professional supercross win in San Diego. He was able to take two further podiums and a win in the shootout race at the final round in Las Vegas, to finish fourth in the standings. In the 2014 AMA Motocross Championship, Hill was sitting in the top-ten in the overall standings until the eighth round, where a shoulder injury ruled him out of the rest of the season.

Move to KTM

Following his success in 2014, Hill signed for the Red Bull KTM Factory Team. After making his debut for the team at the season-ending Monster Energy Cup, he again competed in the 250SX West class, recording two podium finishes and ending the championship fourth for the second year running. Hill picked up his first professional motocross podium at the second round of the 2015 AMA National Motocross Championship, before missing the following four rounds with a concussion sustained after landing on a downed rider. After the Red Bull KTM team became a 450 only team for 2016, Hill was moved to the Troy Lee Designs Red Bull KTM team. Competing in the 250SX East class, he had a strong start to the supercross season, finishing as runner-up at the second round in Daytona and winning the third round in Toronto. At the following round in Detroit, Hill crashed and picked up another concussion, which ruled him out for the remainder of the supercross season and the first half of the motocross season. Upon his return, he picked up two top-five overall finishes outdoors and entered the final round of the 2016 FIM Motocross World Championship in the MX2 class. Despite qualifying fifth for the Grand Prix, Hill did not start either of the races.

Return to Pro Circuit

After two seasons away, Hill re-joined the Monster Energy Pro Circuit Kawasaki team. The move saw Hill take on the 250SX West class, finishing second in the second round, before going on a run of winning four consecutive main events in a row. Finishing on the podium at the three final rounds following this, Hill was able to clinch the title, ending the Pro Circuit team's championship winning drought. Following this, Hill experienced several issues that derailed his 2017 AMA National Motocross Championship, missing four rounds and having a best overall finish of eighth at the opening round. Alongside this, Hill competed in the American round of the 2017 FIM Motocross World Championship, scoring three points in the MX2 class.

JGR Suzuki & first 450 races

Following his championship winning season, Hill changed teams again, this time joining the Autotrader JGR Yoshimura Suzuki Factory Racing squad. His title defence in the 250SX West class brought Hill a third-place finish in Oakland and a win in San Diego, to finish sixth in the final standings. Alongside this, made his debut in the 450 supercross class in Tampa, finishing sixth after winning his heat race and challenging at the front of the field in the early stages. Hill started the first three rounds of the 2018 AMA National Motocross Championship in the 250 class, before moving up to the 450 again from the fourth round onwards. His outdoor debut in the class saw him finish fifth overall and he picked up three further top-ten overall finishes throughout the rest of the season.

=== 450 Career ===
Hill stayed with the JGR Suzuki team for his first full-time 450 supercross season in 2019. With the team in difficulties after losing its title sponsor, Hill scored four top-ten finishes and ended the championship eleventh overall. After the first three rounds of the 2019 AMA National Motocross Championship, Hill suffered a shoulder injury that ruled him out for the rest of the championship. Following this, Hill joined the Smartop MotoConcepts Bullfrog Spas Honda team for the 2020 AMA Supercross Championship. He had a consistent season on the Honda, scoring three top-six finishes, including a fifth at Tampa to finish tenth in the final standings. During contract negotiations with the team for the 2021 season, the two parties were unable to come to an agreement. It was initially confirmed that Hill would make a comeback in 2022 for the Partzilla PRMX team, however, due to a shoulder injury he missed the entire season.

Making his comeback in 2023, Hill signed for the Team Tedder squad alongside his brother for the 2023 AMA Supercross Championship. In a season where the 450 class was hit by injuries to many riders, Hill improved greatly throughout the championship, pushing up to score several top-ten finishes. At the final round, Hill was able to stand on the 450 podium for the first time by finishing third behind Chase Sexton and Aaron Plessinger. Despite only racing supercross, Hill competed at the finals of the 2023 SuperMotocross World Championship. Additionally, he also took on the 2023 FIM Supercross World Championship, finishing fifth in the final FIM world championship standings and winning one of the races at the opening round. Hill continued with the Tedder team for the 2024 AMA Supercross Championship, but had his mid-season disrupted after being landed on by another rider at Daytona. Following his return, he completed the supercross series and rode his first professional outdoor races for five years, when he started at the opening three rounds of the 2024 AMA National Motocross Championship.

Staying with the Tedder team, Hill finished eighth in the final standings of the 2025 AMA Supercross Championship, finishing in the top-ten in all but six of the rounds. Choosing not to compete in any outdoor events, Hill next raced in the 2025 SuperMotocross World Championship playoff rounds, finishing twelfth in the final standings. He returned to the FIM Supercross World Championship later in 2025, but only competed in the first three rounds before separating with the team he was competing for. Returning for the 2026 AMA Supercross Championship with the Tedder team, Hill had a strong final quarter of the season which included three top-six finishes, to end the championship in tenth overall. With direct qualifying for the 2026 SuperMotocross World Championship playoff rounds under threat, Hill raced at the final round of the 2026 AMA National Motocross Championship, scoring five points and securing his direct qualifying spot. He then finished thirteenth in the standings of the SuperMotocross rounds. Hill also raced at the opening round of the 2026 FIM Supercross World Championship, winning the opening race and finishing third overall. The series was then cancelled after the opening round.

== Honours ==
AMA Supercross Championship

- 250SX West: 2017 (gold)

AMA Amateur National Motocross Championship

- 250B Stock: 2011 (gold)
- 85 (12–13) Stock: 2009 (bronze)
- 85 (12–13) Modified: 2009 (bronze)
- 51cc 4-6 AMA Class 1: 2002 (silver)

== Career statistics ==
=== FIM Supercross World Championship ===
==== By season ====
Season	Class	Number	Motorcycle	Team	Overall Wins	Overall Podium	Pts	Plcd
2023	WSX	46	Kawasaki	Team BUD Kawasaki	0	0	122	5th
2025	WSX	46	Kawasaki	Venum BUD Racing	0	0	37	14th
Total					0	0	159	

=== FIM Motocross World Championship ===
==== By season ====
Season	Class	Number	Motorcycle	Team	Race	Race Wins	Overall Wins	Race Top-3	Overall Podium	Pts	Plcd
2016	MX2	154	KTM	Troy Lee Designs Red Bull KTM	0	0	0	0	0	0	N/A
2017	MX2	5	Kawasaki	Monster Energy Pro Circuit Kawasaki	2	0	0	0	0	3	55th
Total					2	0	0	0	0	3	

=== AMA Supercross Championship ===
==== By season ====
Season	Class	Number	Motorcycle	Team	Overall Wins	Overall Podium	Pts	Plcd
2013	250SX East	317	Kawasaki	Monster Energy Pro Circuit Kawasaki	0	0	68	12th
2014	250SX West	35	Kawasaki	Monster Energy Pro Circuit Kawasaki	2	5	159	4th
2015	250SX West	32	KTM	Red Bull KTM Factory Team	0	3	116	4th
2016	250SX East	36	KTM	Troy Lee Designs Red Bull KTM	1	2	63	11th
2017	250SX West	46	Kawasaki	Monster Energy Pro Circuit Kawasaki	4	8	202	1st
2018	250SX West	1	Suzuki	Autotrader JGR Yoshimura Suzuki Factory Racing	1	2	136	6th
2018	450SX	46	Suzuki	Autotrader JGR Yoshimura Suzuki Factory Racing	0	0	18	31st
2019	450SX	46	Suzuki	JGRMX Yoshimura Suzuki Factory Racing	0	0	162	11th
2020	450SX	46	Honda	Smartop MotoConcepts Bullfrog Spas Honda	0	0	213	10th
2023	450SX	46	KTM	Team Tedder Monster Energy Mountain Motorsports	0	1	212	8th
2024	450SX	46	KTM	Team Tedder Monster Energy KTM	0	0	71	17th
2025	450SX	46	KTM	Team Tedder Monster Energy KTM	0	0	194	8th
2026	450SX	46	KTM	Team Tedder Monster Energy KTM	0	0	188	10th
Total					8	21	1802	

=== AMA National Motocross Championship ===
==== By season ====
Season	Class	Number	Motorcycle	Team	Races	Race Wins	Overall Wins	Race Top-3	Overall Podium	Pts	Plcd
2013	250	317	Kawasaki	Monster Energy Pro Circuit Kawasaki	24	0	0	0	0	217	12th
2014	250	35	Kawasaki	Monster Energy Pro Circuit Kawasaki	15	0	0	0	0	150	14th
2015	250	32	KTM	Red Bull KTM Factory Team	14	0	0	1	1	107	18th
2016	250	36	KTM	Troy Lee Designs Red Bull KTM	12	0	0	0	0	122	17th
2017	250	46	Kawasaki	Monster Energy Pro Circuit Kawasaki	15	0	0	0	0	110	19th
2018	250	46	Suzuki	Autotrader JGR Yoshimura Suzuki Factory Racing	6	0	0	0	0	41	24th
2018	450	46	Suzuki	Autotrader JGR Yoshimura Suzuki Factory Racing	14	0	0	0	0	143	12th
2019	450	46	Suzuki	JGRMX Yoshimura Suzuki Factory Racing	6	0	0	0	0	51	24th
2024	450	46	KTM	Team Tedder Monster Energy KTM	6	0	0	0	0	35	27th
2026	450	46	KTM	Team Tedder Racing	2	0	0	0	0	5	43rd
Total					114	0	0	1	1	981	
