= Dean Wilson (motorcyclist) =

British motocross racer

- Nationality: British
- Born: 28 December 1991 (age 34); Glasgow
- Bike number: 15

Dean Wilson (born 28 December 1991) is a British professional motocross and Supercross racer. Wilson won the 2011 AMA Motocross Championship in the 250 class.

Due to his family's relocation at a young age, Wilson has spent the majority of his career competing in the United States, turning professional there in 2010.

In the early years of his professional career, Wilson achieved significant success in both motocross and supercross. Whilst riding for the Monster Energy Pro Circuit Kawasaki team, Wilson took eight professional supercross wins and finished runner-up twice in the regional 250 supercross classes.

Wilson has competed at the Motocross des Nations on seven occasions. Due to having a Canadian passport, his first appearance saw him represent Canada, whilst on all subsequent occasions he has represented Great Britain. He formed part of the British team that finished third at the 2017 Motocross des Nations, breaking a twenty-year podium drought for the team.

Outside of America, Wilson won the 2023 and 2025 Australian Supercross Championship in the SX1 class. He has competed in the FIM Supercross World Championship, finishing third overall in the 2023 season.

== Career ==
=== Junior career ===
Wilson began competing in local motocross races in his native Scotland at a young age and continued to do so after his family moved to Calgary in 1999. After having good results in Canada in the youth ranks, the family moved to California in 2006, where Wilson joined Kawasaki's amateur programme known as Team Green. This move saw Wilson achieve a podium at the AMA Amateur National Motocross Championship the following year, before going on to win his first title at the event in 2008. In his final year as an amateur, Wilson picked up two titles at the event in the 250 A and 450 A/Pro Sport classes.

Due to having both British and Canadian passports, Wilson's results saw him picked to represent the latter at the 2009 Motocross des Nations in what was his first professional event. Despite only being seventeen years old, Wilson impressed at the event, finishing eleventh in his qualifying race and winning the B-Final race ahead of future Grand Prix winner Evgeny Bobryshev. Following these results, the AMA named Wilson as the winner of the 2009 AMA Horizon Award and he signed his first professional contract for the 2010 season with the Monster Energy Pro Circuit Kawasaki team.

=== 250 Career ===
Wilson made his professional debut in the SX Lites East class of the 2010 AMA Supercross Championship. Despite being a rookie, Wilson finished sixth on his debut in Indianapolis, improving to fourth in the following round and landing on the podium with third at his third professional start at Daytona International Speedway. After missing two rounds due to visa issues, Wilson took a second podium by finishing runner-up at the last round and finished the championship sixth in the final standings. His rookie season form continued into that season's AMA Motocross Championship, where he scored his first overall outdoor podium at the second round. Two rounds later, he took his first professional race win and overall win at Budds Creek, backing this up with three podiums in a row at the following three rounds. After picking up a further podium at the ninth round, Wilson went on to win the final round by winning both races to take a perfect score. These results saw him finish fourth in the 250 class final standings and be named the AMA Motocross Rookie of the Year. At the end of the season, Wilson again competed at the Motocross des Nations but this time for Great Britain rather than Canada. Wilson finished sixth and eighth in his main races to finish as the second best MX2 rider at the event, with the team finishing fourth overall.

The successes of his debut season continued into 2011, where finished second in the opening round of the Lites East supercross class before taking his first professional supercross win at the second round in Atlanta. This would give him the championship lead after two rounds but after finishing outside of the top-three in the following two rounds he dropped back in the title race. A second at the fifth round followed by back-to-back wins in Toronto and Arlington saw Wilson finish as runner-up in the series behind Justin Barcia. On the back of this, Wilson had an equally successful start to the AMA Motocross Championship, finishing second overall in all but two of the first eight rounds. He took his first overall win of the season at the ninth round in Unadilla with a double race win, before winning the final two rounds in similar fashion to take the title in his second professional season. Wilson made his second appearance for the British team at the Motocross des Nations at the end of the season, finishing third in his qualifying race and ninth in the opening race, as the team finished fourth again.

Wilson switched to the Lites West class for the 2012 supercross season, taking two event wins in Phoenix and San Diego, alongside two second-place finishes to finish as runner-up to Eli Tomac in the final standings. At the Seattle round, Wilson was involved in an incident with Tomac, which resulted in Wilson crashing and sustaining a shoulder injury. Despite the injury he was keen to compete in the AMA Motocross series following this to defend his title won in the previous season. Riding with the number one plate as defending champion, Wilson had to pull out of the first race at the opening round of the year due to the injured shoulder popping out. This injury would ultimately rule him out for the rest of the season. Wilson initially signed for the Jeff Ward Racing team to compete on a 450 for the full 2013 season. This team folded prior to the start of the season however, leaving Wilson to return to the Monster Energy Pro Circuit Kawasaki team. He won the opening round of the renamed 250SX East class in Arlington before finishing second in the following two rounds. Wilson crashed in his heat race at the Indianapolis round, suffering a collapsed lung, broken back, broken rib and a broken shoulder. The scale of the injuries meant he missed the remaining supercross season but did return for the AMA Motocross Championship, stepping up and making his debut in the 450 class for the first time. After only two rounds, Wilson had a practice crash that reinjured the shoulder he had hurt the previous season and would sit out the rest of the series.

After returning from injury, Wilson competed in the 250SX West class of the 2014 AMA Supercross Championship, taking two main event wins at the third Anaheim round and in Las Vegas at the final round to finish third in the standings. In addition to this, Wilson competed in four rounds of the 450SX class that did not clash with the 250SX West series, filling in for the injured Chad Reed on his Discount Tire Racing/TwoTwo Motorsports Kawasaki. Out of his four starts he finished in the top-ten three times, with a best of seventh at Daytona. In the second race at the opening round of the AMA Motocross Championship, Wilson crashed and suffered a gash in the back of his knee which ruled him out of the following three rounds. Upon his return, he scored four top-six overall finishes as his best results to finish tenth in the final standings. After this tough outdoor season, Wilson competed at the 2014 Motocross des Nations in the Open class, finishing second in his qualifying race before finishing third and fifth in the main races. These results helped the British team finish fourth again with the same amount of points as the third placed American team. Wilson finished as the second placed Open class rider at the event.

=== 450 Career ===
At the conclusion of the 2014 season, Wilson signed with the Red Bull KTM Factory Team to compete full-time in the 450 class on a two-year deal. After three rounds of the 2015 AMA Supercross Championship, Wilson crashed whilst training and tore his ACL and MCL knee ligaments. This ruled him out for the remaining supercross season and he did not return to racing until the final three rounds of the AMA Motocross Championship. Towards the end of 2015, Wilson made his debut in the FIM Motocross World Championship when he rode as a wildcard at the season-ending MXGP of USA. He was fastest in the Saturday Timed Practice session and finished the event fourth overall. Following this, he again competed in the Open class at the 2015 Motocross des Nations, finishing fifth in his qualifying race and coming home sixth and eighth in the main races. Wilson's second season in the factory KTM team had a similarly difficult start, when a crash in practice at the third round led to a torn ACL for the second year running. He returned for the final six rounds of the AMA Motocross Championship, recording a best overall result of sixth at the penultimate round. In addition, he rode in the MXGP class at the final two rounds of the 2016 FIM Motocross World Championship which took place in America.

After two injury-plagued years, Wilson was without a ride for the 2017 season. Prior to the start of the season, he announced his intention to compete as a privateer aboard a Yamaha for the year ahead. In the first four events he finished just outside the top-ten, which caught the eye of the Rockstar Energy Husqvarna Factory Racing team, who signed him from the fifth round onwards. Across the remaining he rounds he recorded nine top-ten finishes, including two fifth places as his best results, to finish eighth in the final standings. Continuing with the team in the 2017 AMA National Motocross Championship, Wilson was one of the front runners in the series, finishing all but two races within the top-ten and recording two overall podiums at Southwick and Spring Creek. After finishing fourth in the series, Wilson was selected for the British team at the 2017 Motocross des Nations, which would see him compete in front of his home crowd. He again performed strongly at the event, qualifying fifth followed by finishing seventh and eighth in the main races, as the team finished third to record their first podium since 1997. Following this, Wilson competed in the season ending Monster Energy Cup, where he finished third overall at the event.

Wilson improved to seventh in the final standings of the 2018 AMA Supercross Championship, finishing second at the twelfth round in Indianapolis for his first 450 supercross podium. When practicing for the outdoor season, Wilson collided with a slower rider mid-air and in the ensuing crash suffered another torn ACL injury. This ruled him out for the entire 2018 AMA National Motocross Championship, with him only returning at the AUS-X Open event in Australia in November, where he finished second. The 2019 AMA Supercross Championship would see Wilson pick up another podium, this time in Houston, as he finished a position higher again in the final standings with sixth. This position was achieved despite missing the final two rounds due to an injured shoulder and kidney contusion that he sustained in a crash at the Denver round. He would return for the final six rounds of the 2019 AMA National Motocross Championship, with several top-eight race finishes within those rounds. The COVID-19 pandemic-impacted 2020 AMA Supercross Championship saw Wilson progress throughout, with several top-six finishes and a third at the final round being the highlights. After five rounds of the 2020 AMA National Motocross Championship, Wilson sustained a slight tear in his left meniscus, which ruled him out for the remainder of the year.

There were further injury issues for Wilson during the 2021 AMA Supercross Championship, where he missed two rounds due to a broken big toe. Throughout the rest of the season he scored seven top-ten overall finishes to end the championship in eleventh. Wilson also had to contend with several issues during the 2021 AMA Motocross season, bruising his liver and kidney area in a crash at the fourth round and missing the final three rounds due to Epstein-Barr virus. After recovering from the illness, Wilson's 2022 AMA Supercross Championship was brought to an end after thirteen rounds, with a big crash in St. Louis causing a laceration. He was able to return for the final four rounds of the 2022 AMA National Motocross Championship, securing two tenth overall finishes in the latter two of these rounds. Wilson returned to compete for the British team at the 2022 Motocross des Nations, riding in the MXGP class, as the team finished tenth overall. The event would be Wilson's last aboard a Husqvarna, as he signed for the Honda Genuine Honda Racing team to compete in the season ending 2022 FIM Supercross World Championship. After two challenging rounds, he finished thirteenth in the final standings.

For the 2023 season, Wilson stayed with the Australian Fire Power Honda team, concentrating on supercross. In the 2023 AMA Supercross Championship, Wilson finished the season tenth overall, finishing the last six rounds in the top-ten. Later in the year, he finished on the podium in two of the three rounds in the 2023 FIM Supercross World Championship, winning a race in Abu Dhabi and ending the championship third behind Ken Roczen and Joey Savatgy. This success was replicated in the Australian Supercross Championship, where he won the SX1 title for the first time. Wilson had a consistent start to the 2024 AMA Supercross Championship, but sustained another shoulder injury at the eighth round. Returning for the final four rounds, Wilson scored a tenth-place finish at the final round. He competed in five rounds of the 2024 AMA National Motocross Championship, before finishing his year in America at the finals of the 2024 SuperMotocross World Championship. Following this, Wilson again competed in the FIM Supercross World Championship, dislocating his shoulder at the third round in a crash with long-time rival Vince Friese. Alongside his regular programme, Wilson also competed in selected rounds of the Brazilian Arenacross Championship in 2024.

Wilson started 2025 by competing in the Arenacross World Tour and the Dortmund Supercross event in Germany, breaking from his usual routine of racing in the AMA Supercross Championship. The British Arenacross Championship was included as qualifying for the Arenacross World Tour final and Wilson was able to comfortably win the British title. Due to injuries for both Jett and Hunter Lawrence, Wilson was drafted into the factory Honda team for the final five rounds of the 2025 AMA Supercross Championship. He was able to record four top-tens, with a best of seventh at the final round. Later in 2025, Wilson also raced at the Arenacross World Tour final in Abu Dhabi, where he looked set to take the title until a late race crash ended his hopes. In addition, Wilson was crowned Brazilian Arenacross Champion in the premier AX Pro class, after a close championship battle with Enzo Lopes. He competed in the three final playoff rounds of the 2025 SuperMotocross World Championship, having to go in the LCQ at each event but qualifying nonetheless. In the latter part of 2025, Wilson was able to win the SX1 class in the five round Australian Supercross Championship.

Wilson was able to successfully defend his British Arenacross title in the opening months of 2026. Following this, he was given the chance to ride the final five rounds of the 2026 AMA Supercross Championship for the Quadlock Honda team. With three top-ten finishes as part of this, Wilson scored enough points to finish twenty-first in the 450SX championship. For the rest of the year, Wilson returned to the Brazilian Arenacross Championship, where he finished second behind Enzo Lopes. He also raced in place of Joey Savatgy at the opening round of the 2026 FIM Supercross World Championship, finishing second overall behind Cooper Webb. The series was ultimately cancelled after that opening round.

== Honours ==
Motocross des Nations

- Team Overall: 2017 (bronze)

FIM Supercross World Championship

- WSX: 2023 (bronze)

AMA Supercross Championship

- SX Lites East: 2011 (silver)
- SX Lites West: 2012 (silver)
- 250SX West: 2014 (bronze)

AMA Motocross Championship

- 250: 2011 (gold)
- AMA Motocross Rookie of the Year: 2010 (gold)

Australian Supercross Championship

- SX1: 2023 & 2025 (gold) , 2024 (silver)

Monster Energy Cup

- Monster Cup: 2017 (bronze)

British Arenacross Championship

- AX Pro: 2025 & 2026 (gold)

Brazilian Arenacross Championship

- AX Pro: 2025 (gold) , 2026 (silver)

AMA Amateur National Motocross Championship

- 450 A/Pro Sport: 2009 (gold)
- 250 A: 2009 (gold)
- Motocross B Modified: 2008 (gold)
- MX Lites B Stock: 2008 (silver)
- Four Stroke 201cc-650cc: 2007 (bronze)

AMA Horizon Award

- 2009 (gold)

== Career statistics ==
=== Motocross des Nations ===
Year	Location	Nation	Class	Teammates	Team Overall	Individual Overall
2009	(Italy) Franciacorta	CAN	MX2	Tyler Medaglia; Mitchell Cooke	27th	N/A
2010	(United States) Thunder Valley	GBR	MX2	Jake Nicholls; Brad Anderson	4th	2nd
2011	(France) Saint-Jean-d'Angély	GBR	MX2	Tommy Searle; Brad Anderson	4th	5th
2014	(Latvia) Ķegums	GBR	Open	Shaun Simpson; Tommy Searle	4th	2nd
2015	(France) Ernée	GBR	Open	Shaun Simpson; Max Anstie	18th	4th
2017	(United Kingdom) Matterley Basin	GBR	Open	Max Anstie; Tommy Searle	3rd	3rd
2022	(United States) Red Bud	GBR	MXGP	Max Anstie; Tommy Searle	10th	10th

=== FIM Motocross World Championship ===
==== By season ====
Season	Class	Number	Motorcycle	Team	Race	Race Wins	Overall Wins	Race Top-3	Overall Podium	Pts	Plcd
2015	MX2	215	KTM	Red Bull KTM Factory Team	2	0	0	0	0	32	31st
2016	MX2	15	KTM	Red Bull KTM Factory Team	4	0	0	0	0	24	30th

=== FIM Supercross World Championship ===
==== By season ====
Season	Class	Number	Motorcycle	Team	Overall Wins	Overall Podium	Pts	Plcd
2022	WSX	15	Honda	Honda Genuine Honda Racing	0	0	57	13th
2023	WSX	15	Honda	Fire Power Honda Racing	0	2	167	3rd
2024	WSX	15	Honda	Fire Power Honda Racing	0	0	148	10th
Total					0	2	372	

=== AMA Supercross Championship ===
==== By season ====
Season	Class	Number	Motorcycle	Team	Overall Wins	Overall Podium	Pts	Plcd
2010	SX Lites East	108	Kawasaki	Monster Energy Pro Circuit Kawasaki	0	2	105	6th
2011	SX Lites East	15	Kawasaki	Monster Energy Pro Circuit Kawasaki	3	5	165	2nd
2012	SX Lites West	15	Kawasaki	Monster Energy Pro Circuit Kawasaki	2	4	154	2nd
2013	250SX East	15	Kawasaki	Monster Energy Pro Circuit Kawasaki	1	3	87	7th
2014	250SX West	15	Kawasaki	Monster Energy Pro Circuit Kawasaki	2	4	163	3rd
2014	450SX	15	Kawasaki	Discount Tire Racing/TwoTwo Motorsports	0	0	47	24th
2015	450SX	15	KTM	Red Bull KTM Factory Team	0	0	23	28th
2016	450SX	15	KTM	Red Bull KTM Factory Team	0	0	18	26th
2017	450SX	15	Yamaha		0	0	185	8th
2017	450SX	15	Husqvarna	Rockstar Energy Husqvarna Factory Racing	0	0	185	8th
2018	450SX	15	Husqvarna	Rockstar Energy Husqvarna Factory Racing	0	1	208	7th
2019	450SX	15	Husqvarna	Rockstar Energy Husqvarna Factory Racing	0	1	223	6th
2020	450SX	15	Husqvarna	Rockstar Energy Husqvarna Factory Racing	0	1	239	8th
2021	450SX	15	Husqvarna	Rockstar Energy Husqvarna Factory Racing	0	0	165	11th
2022	450SX	15	Husqvarna	Rockstar Energy Husqvarna Factory Racing	0	0	152	10th
2023	450SX	15	Honda	Fire Power Honda Racing	0	0	200	10th
2024	450SX	15	Honda	Fire Power Honda Racing	0	0	91	16th
2025	450SX	15	Honda	Team Honda HRC Progressive	0	0	57	22nd
2026	450SX	15	Honda	Quadlock Honda Racing	0	0	60	21st
Total					8	21	2342	

=== AMA National Motocross Championship ===
==== By season ====
Season	Class	Number	Motorcycle	Team	Races	Race Wins	Overall Wins	Race Top-3	Overall Podium	Pts	Plcd
2010	250	108	Kawasaki	Monster Energy Pro Circuit Kawasaki	24	3	2	12	7	437	4th
2011	250	15	Kawasaki	Monster Energy Pro Circuit Kawasaki	24	11	3	22	11	538	1st
2012	250	1	Kawasaki	Monster Energy Pro Circuit Kawasaki	1	0	0	0	0	0	N/A
2013	450	15	Kawasaki	Monster Energy Pro Circuit Kawasaki	4	0	0	0	0	33	26th
2014	250	15	Kawasaki	Monster Energy Pro Circuit Kawasaki	18	0	0	0	0	230	10th
2015	450	15	KTM	Red Bull KTM Factory Team	6	0	0	0	0	60	23rd
2016	450	15	KTM	Red Bull KTM Factory Team	10	0	0	0	0	122	19th
2017	450	15	Husqvarna	Rockstar Energy Husqvarna Factory Racing	24	0	0	3	2	340	4th
2019	450	15	Husqvarna	Rockstar Energy Husqvarna Factory Racing	12	0	0	0	0	140	13th
2020	450	15	Husqvarna	Rockstar Energy Husqvarna Factory Racing	10	0	0	0	0	97	15th
2021	450	15	Husqvarna	Rockstar Energy Husqvarna Factory Racing	17	0	0	0	0	146	16th
2022	450	15	Husqvarna	Rockstar Energy Husqvarna Factory Racing	8	0	0	0	0	63	18th
2024	450	15	Honda	Fire Power Honda Racing	8	0	0	0	0	44	24th
Total					166	14	5	37	20	2250	
