= Colt Nichols =

American motorcycle racer

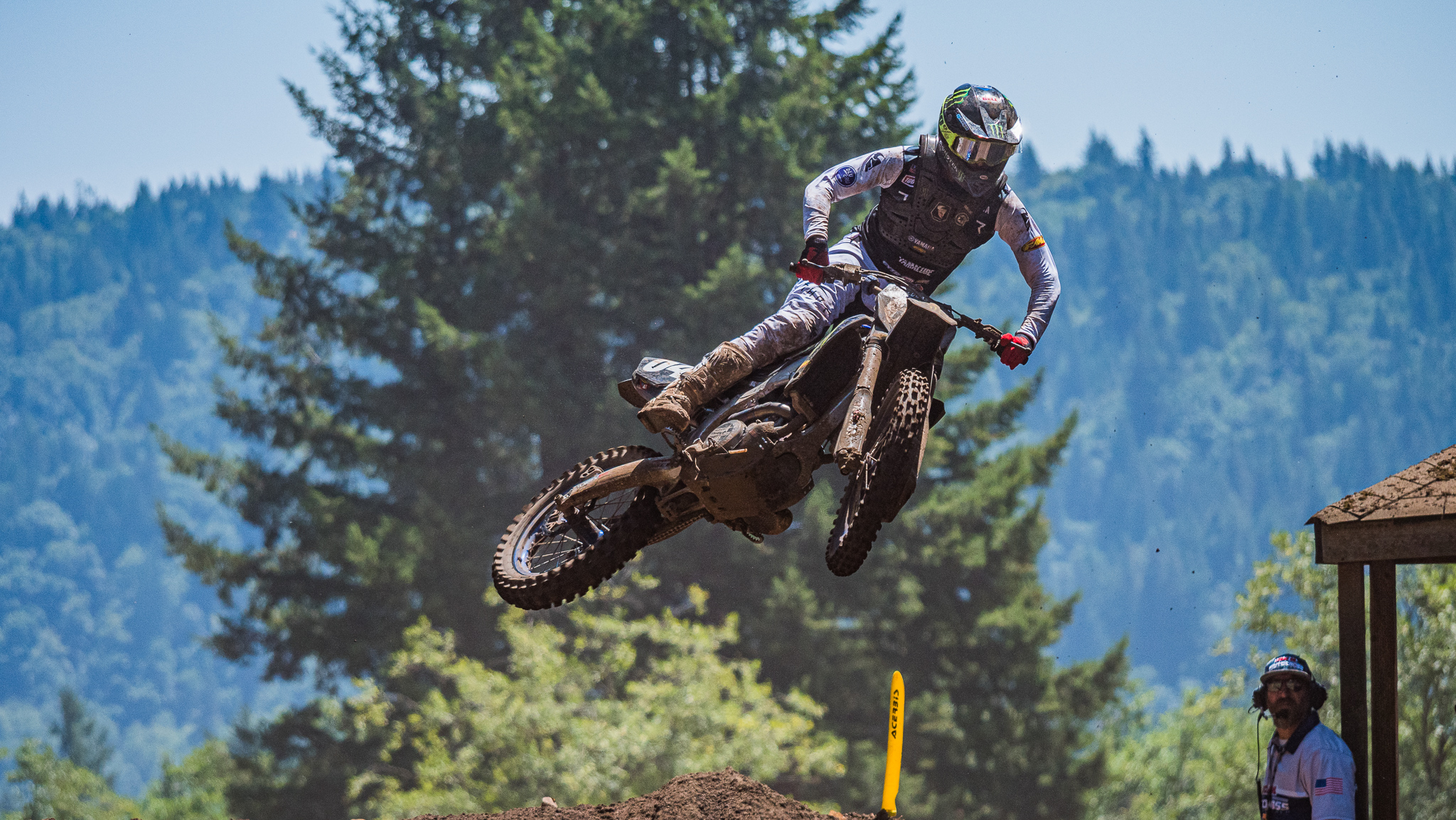
- Nichols in 2021
- Nationality: (United States) American
- Born: 22 March 1994 (age 32) Muskogee, Oklahoma, U.S.

Motocross career
- Years active: 2013–present
- Teams: •Monster Energy Yamaha Star Racing (2016-2022); •Honda HRC (2023); •Liqui Moly Beta (2024)
- Championships: •2021 AMA Supercross 250cc East
- Wins: •AMA Supercross 250cc: 4

Colt Nichols (born March 22, 1994) is an American motorcycle racer who competes in the AMA Supercross and Motocross Championships. He is the 2021 AMA Supercross 250cc East Champion.

== Career ==
Nichols began professional racing in 2013. Nichols races in the 250cc East Championship in AMA Supercross. His greatest career achievement to date was winning the 2021 title in this racing class for Yamaha.

As of October 2022, Nichols rides for HRC Honda in the 450cc class for 2023 as a supercross only ride.

== AMA Supercross/Motocross Results ==
Year	Rnd 1	Rnd 2	Rnd 3	Rnd 4	Rnd 5	Rnd 6	Rnd 7	Rnd 8	Rnd 9	Rnd 10	Rnd 11	Rnd 12	Rnd 13	Rnd 14	Rnd 15	Rnd 16	Rnd 17	Average Finish	Podium Percent	Place
2021 250 SX-E	3	2	1	1	1	3	2	-	-	-	-	-	-	-	-	3	2	2.00	100%	1st
