= Christian Craig =

American motorcycle racer

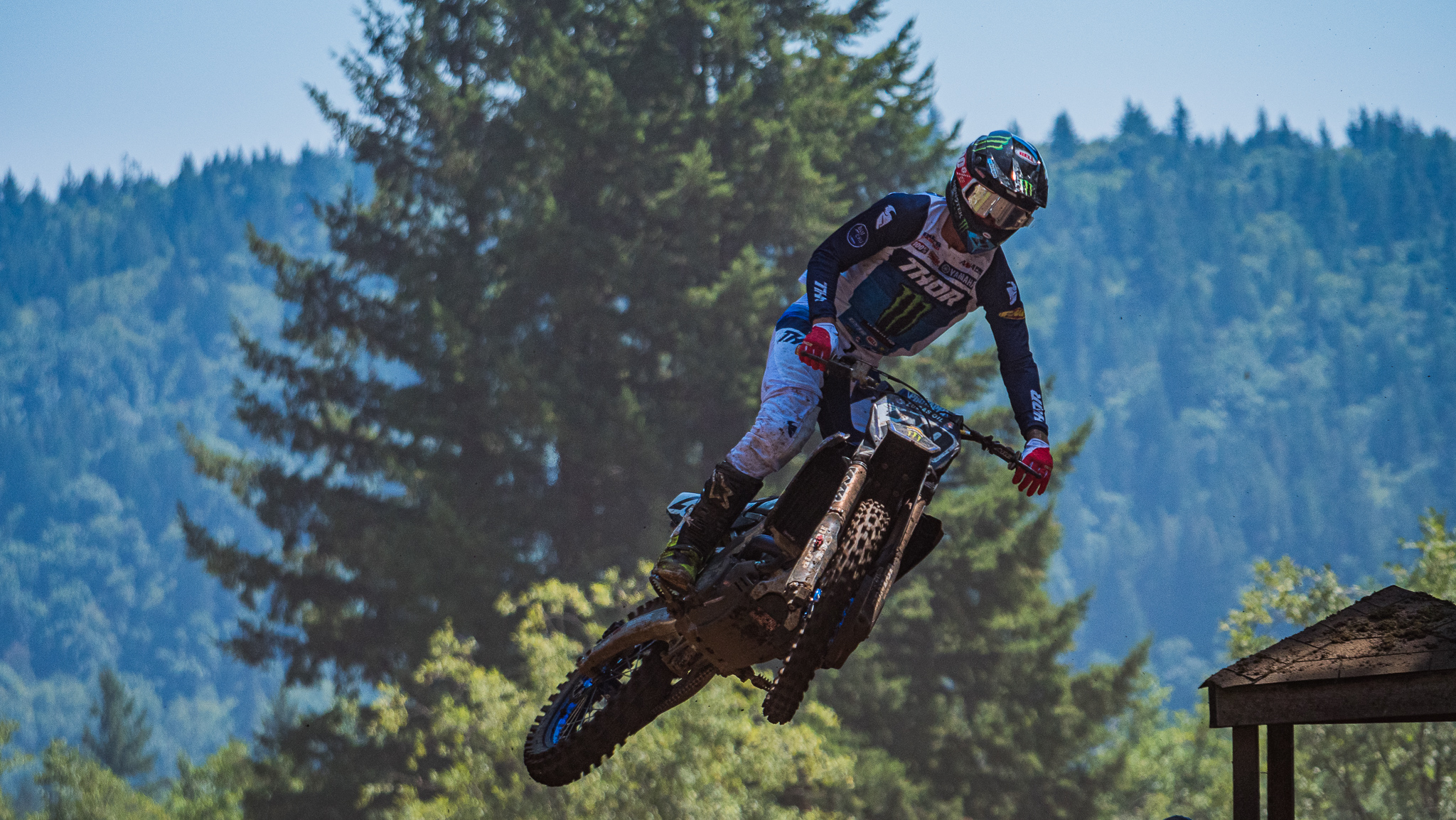
- Craig in 2021
- Nationality: American
- Born: July 19, 1991 (age 35) San Diego, California , United States

Motocross career
- Years active: 2009–Present
- Teams: •Geico Honda; •Monster Energy Star Racing Yamaha (2020-2022, 2024-2025); •Rockstar Energy Factory Racing Husqvarna (2022-2024); •QuadLock Honda (2025-Present)
- Championships: •2022 AMA Supercross 250cc West

Christian Craig (born July 19, 1991) is an American motocross rider who competes in the AMA Supercross Championship. His most notable achievement is winning the 2022 250cc Supercross West title.

== Career ==
Craig competes in the AMA Supercross and AMA Motocross Championships. As of October 2022, Craig rides for the Rockstar Energy Husqvarna team in the 450cc class.

=== 2021 Season ===
Before the 2021 season, it was announced that Craig would be riding for the Monster Energy Star Racing Yamaha team in the 250cc East coast championship. Craig won the season opener at Houston and would podium at five of the following six rounds. Then at the penultimate round (Salt Lake City 1), Craig would crash and end his title aspirations early by not making the main event.

=== 2022 Season ===
Craig won 4 races of the 2022 Supercross season, as well as 9 podiums out of 10, on his way to the 250 West title. He also moved into the 450cc class to race outdoor motocross, where he finished 5th overall in the championship. This was while riding for Monster Energy Star Yamaha.

=== 2023 ===
2023 is the season that Craig has made the full time move to the 450cc class for both Supercross and Motocross. At round 12 during practice, Craig suffered a hard crash in the whoops which resulted in a dislocated hip and elbow, as well as a broken arm. This ruled him out for the entirety of the 2023 supercross season. As of May 25, he was scheduled to race the last five rounds of the Lucas oil Pro Motocross series, however a failed recovery of an injury prevented this.

== AMA Supercross/Motocross results ==
Year	Rnd 1	Rnd 2	Rnd 3	Rnd 4	Rnd 5	Rnd 6	Rnd 7	Rnd 8	Rnd 9	Rnd 10	Rnd 11	Rnd 12	Rnd 13	Rnd 14	Rnd 15	Rnd 16	Rnd 17	Average Finish	Podium Percent	Place
2021 250 SX-E	1	3	2	5	2	1	3	-	-	-	-	-	-	-	-	DNS	DNS	2.42	86%	4th
‘2022 250 SX-W	1	1	3	1	2	1	-	-	-	-	-	2	-	2	-	3	8	2.40	90%	1st
2022 450 MX	3	5	12	8	8	5	4	5	10	6	5	4	-	-	-	-	-	6.25	8%	5th
2023 450 SX	13	7	11	11	11	10	8	10	7	6	9	DNS	OUT	OUT	OUT	OUT	OUT	9.36	-	12th
2024 450 SX	DNF	14	20	14	13	12	OUT	OUT	OUT	OUT	OUT	OUT	OUT	OUT	OUT	OUT	OUT	16.60	-	23rd
2024 450 MX	15	10	10	18	14	10	7	9	8	6	8	-	-	-	-	-	-	10.45	-	8th
2025 450 SX	OUT	OUT	OUT	OUT	OUT	OUT	OUT	OUT	OUT	12	15	17	15	12	14	11	11	13.34	-	19th
2025 450 MX	OUT	OUT	OUT	OUT	OUT	OUT	OUT	OUT	OUT	OUT	OUT	-	-	-	-	-	-	-	-	-
2026 450 SX	11 ANA (California)	15 SDI (California)	13 ANA (California)	12 HOU (Texas)	14 GLE (Arizona)	OUT SEA (Washington (state))	9 ARL (Texas)	13 DAY (Florida)	8 IND (Indiana)	17 BIR (Alabama)	12 DET (Michigan)	11 STL (Missouri)	14 NAS (Tennessee)	13 CLE (Ohio)	15 PHI (Pennsylvania)	12 DEN (Colorado)	9 SLC (Utah)	12.40	-	12th
2026 450 MX	10 FOX (California)	11 HAN (California)	15 THU (Colorado)	15 HIG (Pennsylvania)	DNF RED (Michigan)	DNF SOU (Massachusetts)	OUT SPR (Minnesota)	OUT WAS (Washington (state))	21 UNA (New York (state))	14 BUD (Maryland)	DNF IRN (Indiana)	-	-	-	-	-	-	14.33	-	18th

== Personal life ==
Craig’s father is Mike “Stingray” Craig, a fellow motocross rider. Craig is married to Paige, a TikToker and YouTuber, and has three children. They live in Tallahassee, Florida.
