= 2026 AMA National Motocross Championship =

American motorcycle racing season

The 2026 AMA Motocross Championship season was the 55th AMA Motocross National Championship season, the premier motocross series in USA.

Jett Lawrence was the defending champion in the 450 class, after winning his fourth overall outdoor title in 2025. The Lawrence brothers would win all but two races across the season, with Hunter Lawrence narrowly coming out on top to win his first outdoor title in the 450 class.

In the 250 class, Haiden Deegan was the defending champion. However, he did not defend his title due to moving into the 450 class. New Zealander Cole Davies would succeed Deegan as champion, winning the title in his first full outdoor season in America.

The championship formed the second part of the 2026 SuperMotocross World Championship season.

== Calendar and Results ==
=== 450cc ===
Round	Date	Location	Race 1 Winner	Race 2 Winner	Round Winner
1	May 30	(California) Fox Raceway National	(Australia) Hunter Lawrence	(Australia) Hunter Lawrence	(Australia) Hunter Lawrence
2	June 6	(California) Hangtown Motocross Classic	(Australia) Jett Lawrence	(Australia) Jett Lawrence	(Australia) Jett Lawrence
3	June 13	(Colorado) Thunder Valley National	(Australia) Jett Lawrence	(Australia) Jett Lawrence	(Australia) Jett Lawrence
4	June 20	(Pennsylvania) High Point National	(Australia) Hunter Lawrence	(Australia) Hunter Lawrence	(Australia) Hunter Lawrence
5	July 4	(Michigan) Red Bud National	(Australia) Jett Lawrence	(Australia) Hunter Lawrence	(Australia) Hunter Lawrence
6	July 11	(Massachusetts) Southwick National	(Australia) Hunter Lawrence	(Australia) Jett Lawrence	(Australia) Jett Lawrence
7	July 18	(Minnesota) Spring Creek National	(Australia) Hunter Lawrence	(Australia) Hunter Lawrence	(Australia) Hunter Lawrence
8	July 25	(Washington (state)) Washougal National	(Australia) Jett Lawrence	(Australia) Hunter Lawrence	(Australia) Hunter Lawrence
9	August 15	(New York (state)) Unadilla National	(Australia) Hunter Lawrence	(Australia) Jett Lawrence	(Australia) Jett Lawrence
10	August 22	(Maryland) Budds Creek National	(Australia) Hunter Lawrence	(Australia) Hunter Lawrence	(Australia) Hunter Lawrence
11	August 29	(Indiana) Ironman National	(Spain) Jorge Prado	(Spain) Jorge Prado	(Spain) Jorge Prado

=== 250cc ===
Round	Date	Location	Race 1 Winner	Race 2 Winner	Round Winner
1	May 30	(California) Fox Raceway National	(United States) Levi Kitchen	(United States) Seth Hammaker	(United States) Seth Hammaker
2	June 6	(California) Hangtown Motocross Classic	(United States) Seth Hammaker	(New Zealand) Cole Davies	(United States) Levi Kitchen
3	June 13	(Colorado) Thunder Valley National	(United States) Levi Kitchen	(Belgium) Sacha Coenen	(Japan) Jo Shimoda
4	June 20	(Pennsylvania) High Point National	(New Zealand) Cole Davies	(New Zealand) Cole Davies	(New Zealand) Cole Davies
5	July 4	(Michigan) Red Bud National	(New Zealand) Cole Davies	(Japan) Jo Shimoda	(New Zealand) Cole Davies
6	July 11	(Massachusetts) Southwick National	(Belgium) Sacha Coenen	(Belgium) Sacha Coenen	(Belgium) Sacha Coenen
7	July 18	(Minnesota) Spring Creek National	(United States) Julien Beaumer	(United States) Chance Hymas	(United States) Julien Beaumer
8	July 25	(Washington (state)) Washougal National	(New Zealand) Cole Davies	(New Zealand) Cole Davies	(New Zealand) Cole Davies
9	August 15	(New York (state)) Unadilla National	(United States) Levi Kitchen	(New Zealand) Cole Davies	(New Zealand) Cole Davies
10	August 22	(Maryland) Budds Creek National	(New Zealand) Cole Davies	(United States) Chance Hymas	(United States) Chance Hymas
11	August 29	(Indiana) Ironman National	(United States) Chance Hymas	(United States) Julien Beaumer	(United States) Julien Beaumer

=== Track locations ===
2026 AMA Motocross Championship locations

== 450cc ==
=== Entry list ===
Team	Constructor	No	Rider	Rounds
Honda HRC Progressive	Honda	1	(Australia) Jett Lawrence	All
Honda HRC Progressive	Honda	96	(Australia) Hunter Lawrence	All
Monster Energy Yamaha Star Racing	Yamaha	2	(United States) Cooper Webb	All
Monster Energy Yamaha Star Racing	Yamaha	32	(United States) Justin Cooper	1–2, 9
Monster Energy Yamaha Star Racing	Yamaha	38	(United States) Haiden Deegan	All
Red Bull KTM Factory Racing	KTM	3	(United States) Eli Tomac	1, 7–11
Red Bull KTM Factory Racing	KTM	7	(United States) Aaron Plessinger	1–5, 9–11
Red Bull KTM Factory Racing	KTM	26	(Spain) Jorge Prado	All
Red Bull KTM Factory Racing	KTM	104	(Belgium) Lucas Coenen	3, 6
Monster Energy Kawasaki	Kawasaki	4	(United States) Chase Sexton	1–2
Monster Energy Kawasaki	Kawasaki	36	(United States) Garrett Marchbanks	All
Monster Energy Kawasaki	Kawasaki	417	(Norway) Cornelius Tøndel	6–11
Troy Lee Designs Red Bull Ducati Factory Racing	Ducati	14	(France) Dylan Ferrandis	All
Troy Lee Designs Red Bull Ducati Factory Racing	Ducati	51	(United States) Justin Barcia	1–3, 5–11
5.11 Triumph Factory Racing Team	Triumph	20	(United States) Jordon Smith	All
5.11 Triumph Factory Racing Team	Triumph	31	(Denmark) Mikkel Haarup	All
Rockstar Energy Husqvarna	Husqvarna	24	(United States) RJ Hampshire	All
Rockstar Energy Husqvarna	Husqvarna	27	(United States) Malcolm Stewart	1, 9–11
Quadlock Honda Racing	Honda	28	(United States) Christian Craig	1–6, 9–11
Quadlock Honda Racing	Honda	76	(Australia) Kyle Webster	1–2
Gizmo Racing Yamaha	Yamaha	39	(Switzerland) Valentin Guillod	All
Gizmo Racing Yamaha	Yamaha	63	(Sweden) Fredrik Norén	1–5, 8–11
Gizmo Racing Yamaha	Yamaha	106	(France) Stephen Rubini	3–11
Partzilla Blaster PRMX Racing	Kawasaki	41	(United States) Mitchell Harrison	All
Partzilla Blaster PRMX Racing	Kawasaki	69	(United States) Jack Chambers	All
Partzilla Blaster PRMX Racing	Kawasaki	188	(United States) Hamden Hudson	All
Twisted Tea Suzuki presented by Progressive Insurance	Suzuki	45	(United States) Colt Nichols	1–2, 10–11
Team Tedder Racing	KTM	46	(United States) Justin Hill	11
Wildcat Race Team	Gas Gas	50	(Venezuela) Lorenzo Locurcio	All
Wildcat Race Team	Gas Gas	259	(Venezuela) Daniel Bortolín	1–2, 4–9
Liqui Moly Beta Factory Racing	Beta	52	(United States) Mitchell Oldenburg	1–9
Liqui Moly Beta Factory Racing	Beta	54	(United States) Benny Bloss	All
Liqui Moly Beta Factory Racing	Beta	168	(United States) Zach Osborne	9–11
Champion Tool Storage KMR KTM	KTM	62	(United States) Grant Harlan	All
SLR Honda	Honda	83	(United States) Justin Rodbell	All
SLR Honda	Honda	245	(Denmark) Matti Jørgensen	6–7, 9–11
SLR Honda	Honda	932	(United States) Scotty Clark	10–11
Valley Motorsports	Honda	87	(United States) Jeremy Hand	4–5, 7, 9–11
TiLube Honda Racing	Honda	88	(United States) Mark Fineis	5
ISRT Kawasaki	Kawasaki	88	(United States) Mark Fineis	7–11
ISRT Kawasaki	Kawasaki	417	(Norway) Cornelius Tøndel	1–5
ISRT Kawasaki	Kawasaki	719	(United States) Vince Friese	1–5, 8, 10
ClubMX Yamaha	Yamaha	89	(United States) Devin Simonson	4–8
ClubMX Yamaha	Yamaha	535	(United States) Joey Crown	5–6, 10–11
Short Racing	Honda	90	(United States) John Short	3, 7, 10–11
Fortin Racing	Gas Gas	111	(United States) Larry Fortin	4
We1 Racing	KTM	133	(United States) Dominic DeSimone	1, 3
HBI Racing	KTM	137	(United States) Ayden Shive	6–7
Limited Decal	Yamaha	151	(United States) Aidan Dickens	9–11
Limited Decal	Yamaha	268	(United States) Gage Stine	10
Gold n Pawn Racing	Yamaha	153	(United States) Clayton Tucker	1–2, 8
T. Daniele Landscapes	KTM	157	(United States) Tyler Daniele	6
McGinley Clinic Privateer Support Program	KTM	162	(United States) Whispern Smith	1–5, 7–10
McGinley Clinic Privateer Support Program	Yamaha	181	(United States) Ashton Arruda	6
McGinley Clinic Privateer Support Program	Yamaha	216	(United States) Grant Hoffman	All
McGinley Clinic Privateer Support Program	Yamaha	512	(United States) Austin Cozadd	4, 7–8, 10
McGinley Clinic Privateer Support Program	Husqvarna	603	(United States) Matt Jackson	1, 3
McGinley Clinic Privateer Support Program	Honda	874	(United States) Zack Williams	7–8
Limited Decal	KTM	164	(United States) Evan Johnson	4, 10–11
Limited Decal	KTM	831	(United States) Jacob Glenn	4, 9–10
Limited Decal	KTM	881	(United States) Noah Geyer	4–5, 9–10
Winland Racing	Yamaha	165	(United States) Jack Winland	3–5, 7, 9, 11
Connecticut Land Design Racing	KTM	170	(United States) Adam Dobrovich	6
Motocross Action Magazine	KTM	171	(United States) Josh Mosiman	1–2
Hoover Racing	Yamaha	172	(United States) Hayden Hoover	5–6, 8–9
Horsepower Solutions Triumph of Harrisburg	Triumph	174	(United States) Luca Marsalisi	5, 7, 9–10
BGR Enterprise	Yamaha	176	(United States) Brandon Green	7
Enloe Racing	KTM	177	(United States) Ace Enloe	7
US 27 Motorsports	Yamaha	178	(United States) Justin Kurtz	4–5, 7, 9–11
US 27 Motorsports	Beta	299	(United States) Konnor Visger	1–6
US 27 Motorsports	Kawasaki	470	(United States) Ethan Day	1–5, 7–8, 11
Vacendak Racing	Husqvarna	185	(United States) Matt Vacendak	9
	Honda	193	(United States) Ryan Diezic	4, 7
Grateful Ones MC/Roseville Motorsports/Denzin Racing	Yamaha	194	(United States) Derik Denzin	2
	KTM	195	(Mexico) Jorge Rubalcava	3, 5
Hoag Racing	Honda	196	(United States) Blake Hoag	1–3, 6–7
Monster Energy CDR Yamaha	Yamaha	209	(Australia) Jed Beaton	9–11
Hammond Racing	Yamaha	210	(United States) Bryce Hammond	1–9
2 Roosters Racing	Yamaha	212	(United States) Wyatt Fields	2
Spangle Racing	Honda	213	(United States) Grady Spangle	8
Neidigh's Racing	KTM	215	(United States) Jason Neidigh	4
Gilliam Racing	Gas Gas	217	(United States) Cory Gilliam	4, 10
	KTM	218	(Canada) Parker Eales	8
MotoWhips Racing	KTM	221	(United States) Cody Walker	1–3, 6–11
MotoWhips Racing	KTM	667	(Sweden) Anton Nordström	1–3, 5, 9–11
Factory Connection	Ducati	222	(Italy) Antonio Cairoli	5–7
Warrior MX	Yamaha	225	(United States) Brett Stralo	1–3, 7–8, 11
Cleffy Racing	Kawasaki	230	(United States) Tyler Walborn	4, 9–10
Pasha Racing	Yamaha	232	(Australia) Joel Milesevic	1–2
MFR Racing	Yamaha	234	(United States) Mick Frantz	5
Jena Miller Racing	Yamaha	243	(United States) Dustin Miller	10
Jones Racing	Honda	253	(United States) Nick Jones	8, 11
SloJoe Racing	Yamaha	257	(United States) Joey DeNeen	4
Honda of the Ozarks	Honda	266	(United States) Brett Greenley	7, 11
Moto Adventure Kawasaki Money Inc Actionetix Racing	Kawasaki	269	(United States) Connor Stevenson	3, 7
Bloxom Racing	Honda	274	(United States) Ashton Bloxom	3, 7–9, 11
Stasukelis Racing	Husqvarna	275	(United States) Johnathan Stasukelis	6
Team LMR/RM Army/Full Circle Insurance Racing	Suzuki	281	(United States) Cory Carsten	1–6, 9–11
	Yamaha	287	(United States) Devin Salo	10–11
BWR	Husqvarna	300	(United States) Jonathan Getz	11
Monty Racing	Yamaha	302	(United States) Myles Monty	1–2
Priority MX Thor Gas Gas Racing Team	Gas Gas	304	(Canada) Quinn Amyotte	11
Priority MX Thor Gas Gas Racing Team	Gas Gas	484	(Canada) Tanner Ward	11
Brinks Racing	Yamaha	306	(United States) Damon Strobel	1–3
Sun Powersports KTM	Honda	311	(United States) Raice Hernandez	3, 7
Stepek Logistics	Yamaha	314	(United States) Tyler Stepek	3–6, 10
MPS Enterprise/McGinley Clinic/Ryan's Cardhouse	Honda	316	(United States) Ty Freehill	1
Crotty Racing	Yamaha	318	(United States) Seth Crotty	8
Panzarella Racing	Kawasaki	327	(United States) Alex Panzarella	6, 9
Smiles Limited Racing	Yamaha	329	(United States) Sebastian Toth	8
	KTM	330	(United States) Trevor Paine	4, 9
Privateer Program	KTM	333	(United States) Zane Klemz	5
	Husqvarna	334	(United States) Gary Sutherlin	8
K&M Rebar Legacy Yamaha	Yamaha	349	(United States) Kile Epperson	7–8
Cornish Racing	Yamaha	356	(United States) Chris Cornish	8
	Yamaha	358	(United States) Ivon Hays	5, 10
Beckwith Racing	Yamaha	363	(United States) Taylor Beckwith	6, 9
Wingardner Racing	KTM	365	(United States) Cody Wingardner	1–4, 8
110 Racing	Yamaha	366	(United States) Blaze Cremaldi	4, 9
110 Racing	Honda	529	(United States) Brett Heidorn	3–7, 9–11
McCauley Racing	Yamaha	367	(United States) Christian McCauley	5–6, 10
Pavlou Restaurant Group	Kawasaki	368	(United States) Brock Stiener	4–6
Haynes Racing	Kawasaki	371	(United States) Chase Haynes	5, 11
Austin Black Racing	Yamaha	377	(United States) Austin Black	2
Penwell Racing	Kawasaki	384	(United States) Cody Penwell	4
Lennon Racing	Honda	394	(United States) Michael Lennon	10
TiLube Enraged	Gas Gas	400	(United States) Cole Kish	5, 7, 11
RPM KTM Racing Team	KTM	418	(Australia) Mason Semmens	1–2
Limited Decal	Triumph	419	(United States) Kiliaen van Rensselaer	9–10
DS Racing	Kawasaki	437	(United States) Vincent Luhovey	1–5, 7, 9–11
LaPorte Racing	KTM	439	(United States) Nathen LaPorte	3, 5
Basco Racing	Yamaha	444	(United States) Justin Cokinos	6, 9
GDOGG Racing Yamaha	Yamaha	445	(United States) Noah Miesen	1–7
Phoenix Racing Honda	Honda	453	(Australia) Angus Riordan	6–7
One11ink	Yamaha	456	(Denmark) Magnus Smith	1–3, 5–7, 9–11
Trinity Motorsports	Honda	477	(United States) Mitchell Prescott	5, 7
Jonah Schmidt Racing	Yamaha	481	(United States) Jonah Schmidt	2
Justice	Yamaha	482	(United States) Hayden Justice	4, 10
Life of a Privateer	Yamaha	483	(United States) Bryton Carroll	4–10
Randanella Racing	Kawasaki	488	(United States) Travis Randanella	6
Randanella Racing	Kawasaki	489	(United States) Ricci Randanella	6
Badell Racing	KTM	494	(United States) Jack Badell	1–2, 8
Clinton Racing	Honda	496	(United States) KC Clinton	1–3, 8
JCR Honda	Honda	502	(United States) Ryan Surratt	1–3
Prier Racing	Honda	510	(United States) Travis Prier	7
The Dirt Legal DBD Racing Gas Gas	Gas Gas	511	(United States) Jace Kessler	3–11
Clastic Designs	Kawasaki	517	(United States) Jimmy Hazel	2
Morse Racing	Honda	525	(United States) Rocco Morse	1–2
Full Throttle Motorsports	Kawasaki	528	(United States) Ryan Peters	5, 7–8
Feine Tune Racing	Honda	536	(United States) Gavin Tilford	1–5, 7–11
Mecking Racing	KTM	537	(United States) Travis Mecking	4–6, 9–10
Jansen Racing	KTM	543	(United States) Taylor Jansen	3
Fullthrottle Motorsports	KTM	546	(United States) Harris Huizenga	7
Espe-Tiegs Racing	Gas Gas	548	(United States) Brandon Espe-Tiegs	4–5, 7–8, 11
Citrolas Racing	Ducati	550	(United States) John Citrola	3
	Yamaha	556	(United States) Ethan Phalen	4, 7
	Honda	557	(United States) Elijah Hall	11
Loose Unit Racing	Triumph	558	(United States) Brayden Karpulk	4, 9
FMF Red Bull KTM Off-Road Team	KTM	563	(United States) Dante Oliveira	1–3
Jordan Isola Racing	Honda	571	(United States) Jordan Isola	2
Warda Racing	KTM	572	(United States) RJ Warda	1–2, 8
CCR Racing	Yamaha	573	(United States) Christopher Blackmer	5
SUN Powersports Race Team	KTM	579	(United States) Carson Roberson	3, 8
Illinois Powersports	Kawasaki	588	(United States) Eddie Norred	5, 7, 11
Bowman Racing	KTM	592	(United States) Josh Bowman	7
Factory Moto Kids	Honda	618	(United States) Talon Gorman	2
Factory Moto Kids	Honda	821	(United States) Jeffrey Gorman	2, 8
Trinity Motorsports	Yamaha	621	(United States) Bennett Mantooth	4, 9–11
Thompsons Family of Dealerships Yamaha	Yamaha	626	(United States) Shane Heywood	2
Hubert Racing	Kawasaki	647	(United States) Matthew Hubert	11
Team Chronic	KTM	654	(United States) Kyle Hatch	6, 9
Loud Racing	Gas Gas	655	(United States) Tyler Loud	9
GFR	Honda	662	(United States) Dean Gall	3, 5, 7, 11
Allen Racing	Kawasaki	666	(United States) Collin Hinrichs	7–8
AwakenCo	KTM	671	(United States) Tyler DuCray	2
Fitch Racing Inc	KTM	676	(United States) Robert Fitch	3
McGrath Powersports	Honda	693	(United States) Bryce McLaud	7, 11
Tom Zont Racing	Yamaha	701	(United States) Kyle Kunstman	7
Mowry Racing	Husqvarna	703	(United States) Conner Mowry	4–5, 7, 9
Strode Racing	Honda	714	(United States) Kaiser Strode	2, 8
AWOL Racing	Yamaha	721	(United States) Nathan Murphy	4, 6, 10
Josh Carson Privateer	Kawasaki	722	(United States) Josh Carson	4
JMC Motorsports	Gas Gas	725	(United States) Tyler Hansen	8
Vault Leverage Capital	Kawasaki	726	(United States) Gared Steinke	8
	Yamaha	727	(United States) Bradley Esper	4
Axcel Energy/Live Sent Ministries Kawasaki	Kawasaki	733	(United States) Steve Mages	4, 11
Onsite Tire Racing	Yamaha	734	(United States) Dayton Briggs	1–2, 8
	Yamaha	742	(United States) Karson Walter	9
Twisted AAAmx Team	Yamaha	743	(United States) Colton Pursley	11
Hebelers Motorsports	KTM	746	(United States) Trevor Schmidt	9
Thomas Brothers Racing	KTM	747	(United States) Robbie Thomas	4, 9–10
Revenant	Honda	766	(United States) Eric Rivera	2
Wharton Racing	Kawasaki	767	(United States) Mason Wharton	8
Shondeck Racing	Gas Gas	768	(United States) Cole Shondeck	3
MX6 Racing	Yamaha	771	(Netherlands) Kevin Buitenhuis	6
Limited Decal	Honda	773	(United States) Sage Powers	1–3, 8
Morgan Racing	Yamaha	774	(United States) Hayden Morgan	3
Werks Powersports	Triumph	781	(United States) Ryder Thompson	11
Best Family Racing	KTM	791	(United States) Paulie Best Jr	9
	Honda	792	(United States) Matt Wilson	8
Platinum Powersports Yamaha	Yamaha	797	(United States) Karter Delong	3–6, 9
Lojaks Cycles	Yamaha	808	(United States) Zach Gareis	4–5, 7, 9–11
Williams Racing	Suzuki	811	(United States) Chris Williams	5–7
VPE Racing	Kawasaki	818	(United States) Ronnie Snyder	4, 6
VanVreede Racing	KTM	819	(United States) Deegan VanVreede	3
Ripper 822	Husqvarna	822	(United States) Riley Ripper	7
Dane Morales Racing	Husqvarna	833	(United States) Dane Morales	11
Montys Motorsports FXR KTM Racing	KTM	834	(United States) Kris Corey	6, 9
Lords Racing	KTM	835	(United States) Conner Lords	7–8
Walker Motorsports	KTM	841	(United States) Jeff Walker	5
Hamalainen Racing	KTM	855	(United States) Reece Hamalainen	2, 8
Tech Service Racing	Yamaha	856	(United States) Scott Iverson	6, 9
Kyle Petrie Racing	Kawasaki	860	(United States) Kyle Petrie	5–7, 9
Vaccaro Racing	KTM	868	(United States) Italo Vaccaro	2
Lasting Impressions CG llc	Honda	873	(United States) Ronnie Orres	3, 5, 7, 9–11
HYMN Racing	Yamaha	877	(United States) Anthony Castaneda	1–2
Hollywood Grafx	Husqvarna	878	(United States) Eric McKay	10
Corcoran Landscape Race Team	KTM	880	(United States) Mikey Corcoran	4–5, 9–11
Team 887	Honda	887	(United States) Shane Kelleher	6
Dieselwerx/Legend X Truck Beds	Yamaha	894	(United States) Luke Bierek	8
MVMT Company/3 Seas Recreation	Beta	912	(United States) Bryn Steffan	4
HRT	Kawasaki	924	(United States) Gage Hulsey	6
Kehoe Racing	Yamaha	927	(United States) Shane Kehoe	5–6, 10–11
Morningstar Racing	KTM	929	(Canada) Payton Morningstar	4
Moriarty Racing	Husqvarna	933	(United States) Dylan Moriarty	6
Medeiros Racing	Gas Gas	934	(United States) Brian Medeiros	1–3, 5
Kosak KTM Racing Team	KTM	939	(Netherlands) Roan van de Moosdijk	5–6
Talbott Motorsports	Yamaha	940	(United States) Evan Talbott	4, 10–11
Storm Lake Honda	Honda	942	(United States) Deegan Hepp	3–4, 7
Cleffy Racing	Kawasaki	960	(United States) Bryce Walborn	9–10
Langston Racing	Gas Gas	963	(United States) Isaac Langston	11
	Yamaha	971	(United States) Cameron Russell	8
Jupa Racing	KTM	994	(United States) Juan Paul Sanchez	6
Jimmy Hebert Racing	Gas Gas	997	(United States) Jimmy Hebert	6

=== Riders Championship ===
Pos	Rider	Bike	FOX (California)		HAN (California)		THU (Colorado)		HIG (Pennsylvania)		RED (Michigan)		SOU (Massachusetts)		SPR (Minnesota)		WAS (Washington (state))		UNA (New York (state))		BUD (Maryland)		IRN (Indiana)		Points
1	(Australia) Hunter Lawrence	Honda	1	1	2	2	4	4	1	1	2	1	1	4	1	1	2	1	1	Ret	1	1	8	4	474
2	(Australia) Jett Lawrence	Honda	4	3	1	1	1	1	2	2	1	5	2	1	2	5	1	3	2	1	5	2	11	3	472
3	(United States) Haiden Deegan	Yamaha	5	4	3	3	11	3	4	3	10	3	3	2	4	2	4	2	4	3	2	4	16	2	404
4	(Spain) Jorge Prado	KTM	2	2	Ret	13	7	5	3	5	3	2	4	3	13	3	3	4	3	2	3	3	1	1	401
5	(United States) RJ Hampshire	Husqvarna	6	7	5	7	5	8	10	7	4	4	8	10	3	4	7	6	6	8	12	6	2	6	346
6	(United States) Garrett Marchbanks	Kawasaki	28	8	6	5	3	6	5	6	5	6	5	5	15	6	Ret	DNS	5	4	9	11	6	7	296
7	(France) Dylan Ferrandis	Ducati	9	10	4	6	8	9	11	Ret	6	10	6	11	7	9	5	5	9	6	14	8	18	Ret	269
8	(United States) Cooper Webb	Yamaha	13	13	9	9	10	10	7	Ret	8	8	10	6	8	25	9	9	12	10	6	9	3	8	264
9	(Denmark) Mikkel Haarup	Triumph	10	14	7	12	12	11	8	8	7	7	12	7	Ret	Ret	12	12	13	11	8	5	4	14	246
10	(United States) Justin Barcia	Ducati	17	16	10	10	15	DNS			9	9	14	9	5	8	6	7	14	7	7	10	9	10	226
11	(United States) Jordon Smith	Triumph	15	23	21	14	13	12	9	13	11	12	11	8	14	7	8	8	11	24	Ret	17	10	13	191
12	(United States) Aaron Plessinger	KTM	8	9	12	Ret	6	7	6	4	Ret	DNS							Ret	Ret	10	7	5	9	159
13	(United States) Benny Bloss	Beta	14	21	13	20	19	16	Ret	10	Ret	Ret	Ret	19	10	10	10	10	15	13	18	12	15	12	139
14	(United States) Eli Tomac	KTM	Ret	DNS											9	12	14	14	7	14	4	13	7	5	121
15	(United States) Mitchell Harrison	Kawasaki	22	20	20	17	21	18	15	12	15	15	17	14	21	14	11	15	17	19	13	19	17	15	117
16	(Norway) Cornelius Tøndel	Kawasaki	18	26	16	15	14	13	12	Ret	Ret	Ret	9	13	12	11	17	18	16	17	17	22	Ret	DNS	112
17	(Switzerland) Valentin Guillod	Yamaha	26	Ret	14	11	17	14	14	11	14	19	13	12	16	13	29	20	19	30	26	32	32	28	101
18	(United States) Christian Craig	Honda	11	11	15	8	9	Ret	Ret	9	Ret	Ret	30	DNS					Ret	18	11	18	Ret	DNS	88
19	(United States) Justin Cooper	Yamaha	3	6	8	Ret													8	12					74
20	(Venezuela) Lorenzo Locurcio	Gas Gas	29	25	22	28	23	20	Ret	21	19	14	20	16	17	17	15	13	24	15	23	16	20	22	63
21	(United States) Chase Sexton	Kawasaki	7	5	11	4																			61
22	(Australia) Jed Beaton	Yamaha																	10	9	16	15	13	11	58
23	(United States) Mark Fineis	Honda									13	16													55
23	(United States) Mark Fineis	Kawasaki													11	Ret	Ret	Ret	21	5	19	Ret	14	Ret	55
24	(Sweden) Fredrik Norén	Yamaha	30	24	17	23	16	19	13	15	DNS	DNS					20	11	Ret	Ret	27	Ret	19	18	50
25	(Belgium) Lucas Coenen	KTM					2	2					29	DNS											44
26	(Italy) Antonio Cairoli	Ducati									12	13	15	Ret	6	Ret									42
27	(United States) Malcolm Stewart	Husqvarna	12	Ret															23	16	15	14	12	Ret	41
28	(United States) Grant Harlan	KTM	21	19	33	29	18	17	Ret	16	22	17	31	20	25	23	21	24	30	21	Ret	DNS	25	23	28
29	(United States) Mitchell Oldenburg	Beta	Ret	33	30	25	22	22	18 (Note: Oldenburg was docked 5 championship points for jumping on a red cross flag.)	23	16	27	16	29	20	27	13	17	Ret	DNS					27
30	(Netherlands) Roan van de Moosdijk	KTM									Ret	11	7	Ret											26
31	(United States) Dante Oliveira	KTM	19	15	18	18	24	15																	25
32	(France) Stephen Rubini	Yamaha					32	29	23	Ret	20	29	Ret	DNS	18	15	16	23	20	20	Ret	Ret	Ret	DNS	23
33	(United States) Jeremy Hand	Honda							16	14	Ret	21			29	35			27	27	25	21	21	20	19
34	(United States) Devin Simonson	Yamaha							19 (Note: Simonson was docked 5 championship points for jumping on a red cross flag.)	20	21	20	34	15	19	16	23	22							19
35	(United States) Colt Nichols	Suzuki	20	17	25	16															Ret	23	Ret	16	19
36	(United States) Justin Rodbell	Honda	Ret	22	26	33	20	25	17	17	Ret	22	21	21	27	28	22	21	25	22	21	24	26	19	19
37	(Australia) Kyle Webster	Honda	16	12	Ret	DNS																			16
38	(United States) Hamden Hudson	Kawasaki	23	29	29	26	27	24	26	24	17	18	18	25	28	19	Ret	Ret	29	31	22	29	35	27	16
39	(United States) Jack Chambers	Kawasaki	33	34	27	22	25	Ret	21	18	23	32	Ret	Ret	Ret	24	18	19	18	23	Ret	28	24	24	16
40	(United States) Vince Friese	Kawasaki	24	18	Ret	21	26	Ret	DNS	DNS	Ret	Ret					19	16			Ret	Ret			14
41	(Australia) Mason Semmens	KTM	27	30	19	19																			6
42	(Denmark) Magnus Smith	Yamaha	31	32	28	30	36	28			25	25	19	23	24	20			32	29	24	25	23	21	6
43	(United States) Justin Hill	KTM																					22	17	5
44	(Sweden) Anton Nordström	KTM	34	28	24	24	28	21			18	Ret							26	25	28	26	DNQ	DNQ	5
45	(United States) Vincent Luhovey	Kawasaki	DNQ	36	34	32	30	26	20	19	31	30			32	33			28	28	DNQ	30	34	33	5
46	(Australia) Angus Riordan	Honda											23	18	22	26									4
47	(United States) Zach Osborne	Beta																	22	Ret	20	20	DNS	DNS	4
48	(Denmark) Matti Jørgensen	Honda											28	Ret	30	21			DNQ	DNQ	31	Ret	DNQ	DNQ	1
	(United States) John Short	Honda					31	23							26	22					DNQ	DNQ	DNQ	DNQ	0
	(United States) Tyler Stepek	Yamaha					Ret	32	22	Ret	28	31	25	32							Ret	33			0
	(United States) Brett Heidorn	Honda					DNQ	DNQ	25	22	DNQ	DNQ	DNQ	30	33	34			DNQ	DNQ	DNQ	DNQ	DNQ	29	0
	(United States) Ayden Shive	KTM											26	22	Ret	Ret									0
	(United States) Joey Crown	Yamaha									29	33	24	24							DNQ	DNQ	36	31	0
	(Canada) Tanner Ward	Gas Gas																					28	25	0
	(Canada) Quinn Amyotte	Gas Gas																					29	26	0
	(United States) Zack Williams	Honda													34	32	26	27							0
	(United States) Ronnie Orres	Honda					DNQ	DNQ			30	26			DNQ	DNQ			33	34	DNQ	DNQ	33	30	0
	(United States) Justin Cokinos	Yamaha											DNQ	26					34	33					0
	(United States) Luca Marsalisi	Triumph									27	28			31	30			35	32	29	27			0
	(United States) Dayton Briggs	Yamaha	35	37	DNQ	DNQ											27	30							0
	(United States) Jonathan Getz	Husqvarna																					27	Ret	0
	(United States) Cory Carsten	Suzuki	DNQ	DNQ	DNQ	DNQ	38	33	28	28	DNQ	DNQ	DNQ	DNQ					DNQ	DNQ	DNQ	DNQ	DNQ	DNQ	0
	(United States) Ricci Randanella	Kawasaki											33	28											0
	(United States) Clayton Tucker	Yamaha	Ret	35	37	35											30	31							0
	(United States) Chase Haynes	Kawasaki									DNQ	DNQ											30	32	0
	(United States) Conner Mowry	Husqvarna							34	30	DNQ	DNQ			DNQ	DNQ			DNQ	DNQ					0
	(United States) Ryan Surratt	Honda	32	31	32	34	DNQ	DNQ																	0
	(United States) Grant Hoffman	Yamaha	DNQ	DNQ	DNQ	DNQ	35	35	31	32	DNQ	DNQ	DNQ	DNQ	DNQ	DNQ	DNQ	DNQ	DNQ	DNQ	DNQ	DNQ	DNQ	DNQ	0
	(United States) Kile Epperson	Yamaha													DNQ	DNQ	31	32							0
	(United States) Bradley Esper	Yamaha							33	31															0
	(United States) Sage Powers	Honda	DNQ	DNQ	DNQ	DNQ	34	31									Ret	DNS							0
	(United States) Kris Corey	KTM											DNQ	31					DNQ	DNQ					0
	(United States) Gage Stine	Yamaha																			32	31			0
	(United States) Gary Sutherlin	Husqvarna															33	35							0
	(United States) Gared Steinke	Kawasaki															Ret	33							0
	(United States) Ashton Bloxom	Honda					DNQ	DNQ							DNQ	DNQ	34	34	DNQ	DNQ			DNQ	34	0
	(United States) Cody Walker	KTM	DNQ	DNQ	DNQ	DNQ	DNQ	34					DNQ	DNQ	DNQ	DNQ	35	Ret	DNQ	DNQ	DNQ	DNQ	DNQ	DNQ	0
	(United States) Kyle Petrie	Kawasaki									DNQ	34	DNQ	DNQ	36	36			DNQ	DNQ					0
	(United States) Josh Mosiman	KTM	36	38	35	36																			0
	(United States) Karter Delong	Yamaha					DNQ	DNQ	36	35	DNQ	DNQ	DNQ	DNQ					DNQ	DNQ					0
	(United States) Ashton Arruda	Yamaha											Ret	Ret											0
	(United States) Aidan Dickens	Yamaha																	DNQ	35	DNQ	DNQ	DNQ	DNQ	0
	(Mexico) Jorge Rubalcava	KTM					DNQ	36			DNQ	DNQ													0
	(United States) Seth Crotty	Yamaha															DNQ	36							0
	(United States) Dean Gall	Honda					37	37			DNQ	DNQ			DNQ	DNQ							DNQ	DNQ	0
	(United States) Austin Black	Yamaha			DNQ	37																			0
	(United States) Tyler Hansen	Gas Gas															DNQ	Ret							0
	(United States) Blake Hoag	Honda	DNQ	DNQ	DNQ	DNQ	Ret	DNS					Ret	Ret	DNQ	DNQ									0
	(United States) Tyler DuCray	KTM			Ret	Ret																			0
	(United States) Bryton Carroll	Yamaha							29 (Note: Carroll was docked 10 championship points for jumping on two red cross flags.)	29	24	23	22	17	23	18	32	29	31	26	Ret	Ret			-1
	(United States) Bryce Hammond	Yamaha	25	27	23	27	29	27	27 (Note: Hammond was docked 5 championship points for jumping on a red cross flag.)	26	DNQ	DNQ	27	33	DNQ	DNQ	28	28	DNQ	DNQ					-5
	(United States) Jace Kessler	Gas Gas					33	30	24 (Note: Kessler was docked 5 championship points for jumping on a red cross flag.)	27	32	Ret	Ret	27	Ret	31	24	26	36	36	30	34	31	Ret	-5
	(Venezuela) Daniel Bortolín	Gas Gas	DNQ	DNQ	31	31			30 (Note: Bortolín was docked 5 championship points for jumping on a red cross flag.)	25	26	24	32	Ret	35	29	25	25	DNQ	DNQ					-5
	(United States) Robbie Thomas	KTM							32 (Note: Thomas was docked 5 championship points for jumping on a red cross flag.)	33			DNQ	DNQ					DNQ	DNQ	DNQ	DNQ			-5
	(United States) Mikey Corcoran	KTM							35 (Note: Thomas was docked 5 championship points for jumping on a red cross flag.)	34	DNQ	DNQ							DNQ	DNQ	DNQ	DNQ	DNQ	35	-5
	(United States) Gavin Tilford	Honda	DNQ	DNQ	DNQ	DNQ	DNQ	DNQ	DNQ	DNQ	DNQ	DNQ			DNQ	DNQ	DNQ	DNQ	DNQ	DNQ	DNQ	DNQ	DNQ	DNQ	0
	(United States) Whispern Smith	KTM	DNQ	DNQ	DNQ	DNQ	DNQ	DNQ	DNQ	DNQ	DNQ	DNQ			DNQ	DNQ	DNQ	DNQ	DNQ	DNQ	DNQ	DNQ			0
	(United States) Ethan Day	Kawasaki	DNQ	DNQ	DNQ	DNQ	DNQ	DNQ	DNQ	DNQ	DNQ	DNQ			DNQ	DNQ	DNQ	DNQ					DNQ	DNQ	0
	(United States) Noah Miesen	Yamaha	DNQ	DNQ	DNQ	DNQ	DNQ	DNQ	DNQ	DNQ	DNQ	DNQ	DNQ	DNQ	DNQ	DNQ									0
	(United States) Konnor Visger	Beta	DNQ	DNQ	DNQ	DNQ	DNQ	DNQ	DNQ	DNQ	DNQ	DNQ	DNQ	DNQ											0
	(United States) Brett Stralo	Yamaha	DNQ	DNQ	DNQ	DNQ	DNQ	DNQ							DNQ	DNQ	DNQ	DNQ					DNQ	DNQ	0
	(United States) Jack Winland	Yamaha					DNQ	DNQ	DNQ	DNQ	DNQ	DNQ			DNQ	DNQ			DNQ	DNQ			DNQ	DNQ	0
	(United States) Justin Kurtz	Yamaha							DNQ	DNQ	DNQ	DNQ			DNQ	DNQ			DNQ	DNQ	DNQ	DNQ	DNQ	DNQ	0
	(United States) Zach Gareis	Yamaha							DNQ	DNQ	DNQ	DNQ			DNQ	DNQ			DNQ	DNQ	DNQ	DNQ	DNQ	DNQ	0
	(United States) Cody Wingardner	KTM	DNQ	DNQ	DNQ	DNQ	DNQ	DNQ	DNQ	DNQ							DNQ	DNQ							0
	(United States) Travis Mecking	KTM							DNQ	DNQ	DNQ	DNQ	DNQ	DNQ					DNQ	DNQ	DNQ	DNQ			0
	(United States) Brandon Espe-Tiegs	Gas Gas							DNQ	DNQ	DNQ	DNQ			DNQ	DNQ	DNQ	DNQ					DNQ	DNQ	0
	(United States) Brian Medeiros	Gas Gas	DNQ	DNQ	DNQ	DNQ	DNQ	DNQ			DNQ	DNQ													0
	(United States) KC Clinton	Honda	DNQ	DNQ	DNQ	DNQ	DNQ	DNQ									DNQ	DNQ							0
	(United States) Noah Geyer	KTM							DNQ	DNQ	DNQ	DNQ							DNQ	DNQ	DNQ	DNQ			0
	(United States) Austin Cozadd	Yamaha							DNQ	DNQ					DNQ	DNQ	DNQ	DNQ			DNQ	DNQ			0
	(United States) Bennett Mantooth	Yamaha							DNQ	DNQ									DNQ	DNQ	DNQ	DNQ	DNQ	DNQ	0
	(United States) Hayden Hoover	Yamaha									DNQ	DNQ	DNQ	DNQ			DNQ	DNQ	DNQ	DNQ					0
	(United States) Shane Kehoe	Yamaha									DNQ	DNQ	DNQ	DNQ							DNQ	DNQ	DNQ	DNQ	0
	(United States) Damon Strobel	Yamaha	DNQ	DNQ	DNQ	DNQ	DNQ	DNQ																	0
	(United States) RJ Warda	KTM	DNQ	DNQ	DNQ	DNQ											DNQ	DNQ							0
	(United States) Jack Badell	KTM	DNQ	DNQ	DNQ	DNQ											DNQ	DNQ							0
	(United States) Deegan Hepp	Honda					DNQ	DNQ	DNQ	DNQ					DNQ	DNQ									0
	(United States) Brock Stiener	Kawasaki							DNQ	DNQ	DNQ	DNQ	DNQ	DNQ											0
	(United States) Nathan Murphy	Yamaha							DNQ	DNQ			DNQ	DNQ							DNQ	DNQ			0
	(United States) Jacob Glenn	KTM							DNQ	DNQ									DNQ	DNQ	DNQ	DNQ			0
	(United States) Tyler Walborn	Kawasaki							DNQ	DNQ									DNQ	DNQ	DNQ	DNQ			0
	(United States) Evan Talbott	Yamaha							DNQ	DNQ											DNQ	DNQ	DNQ	DNQ	0
	(United States) Evan Johnson	KTM							DNQ	DNQ											DNQ	DNQ	DNQ	DNQ	0
	(United States) Chris Williams	Suzuki									DNQ	DNQ	DNQ	DNQ	DNQ	DNQ									0
	(United States) Christian McCauley	Yamaha									DNQ	DNQ	DNQ	DNQ							DNQ	DNQ			0
	(United States) Ryan Peters	Kawasaki									DNQ	DNQ			DNQ	DNQ	DNQ	DNQ							0
	(United States) Cole Kish	Gas Gas									DNQ	DNQ			DNQ	DNQ							DNQ	DNQ	0
	(United States) Eddie Norred	Kawasaki									DNQ	DNQ			DNQ	DNQ							DNQ	DNQ	0
	(United States) Anthony Castaneda	Yamaha	DNQ	DNQ	DNQ	DNQ																			0
	(Australia) Joel Milesevic	Yamaha	DNQ	DNQ	DNQ	DNQ																			0
	(United States) Rocco Morse	Honda	DNQ	DNQ	DNQ	DNQ																			0
	(United States) Myles Monty	Yamaha	DNQ	DNQ	DNQ	DNQ																			0
	(United States) Dominic DeSimone	KTM	DNQ	DNQ			DNQ	DNQ																	0
	(United States) Matt Jackson	Husqvarna	DNQ	DNQ			DNQ	DNQ																	0
	(United States) Kaiser Strode	Honda			DNQ	DNQ											DNQ	DNQ							0
	(United States) Jeffrey Gorman	Honda			DNQ	DNQ											DNQ	DNQ							0
	(United States) Reece Hamalainen	KTM			DNQ	DNQ											DNQ	DNQ							0
	(United States) Nathen LaPorte	KTM					DNQ	DNQ			DNQ	DNQ													0
	(United States) Raice Hernandez	Honda					DNQ	DNQ							DNQ	DNQ									0
	(Canada) Connor Stevenson	Kawasaki					DNQ	DNQ							DNQ	DNQ									0
	(United States) Carson Roberson	KTM					DNQ	DNQ									DNQ	DNQ							0
	(United States) Ronnie Snyder	Kawasaki							DNQ	DNQ			DNQ	DNQ											0
	(United States) Ethan Phalen	Yamaha							DNQ	DNQ					DNQ	DNQ									0
	(United States) Ryan Diezic	Honda							DNQ	DNQ					DNQ	DNQ									0
	(United States) Blaze Cremaldi	Yamaha							DNQ	DNQ									DNQ	DNQ					0
	(United States) Brayden Karpulk	Triumph							DNQ	DNQ									DNQ	DNQ					0
	(United States) Trevor Paine	KTM							DNQ	DNQ									DNQ	DNQ					0
	(United States) Hayden Justice	Yamaha							DNQ	DNQ											DNQ	DNQ			0
	(United States) Cory Gilliam	Gas Gas							DNQ	DNQ											DNQ	DNQ			0
	(United States) Steve Mages	Kawasaki							DNQ	DNQ													DNQ	DNQ	0
	(United States) Mitchell Prescott	Honda									DNQ	DNQ			DNQ	DNQ									0
	(United States) Ivon Hays	Yamaha									DNQ	DNQ									DNQ	DNQ			0
	(United States) Alex Panzarella	Kawasaki											DNQ	DNQ					DNQ	DNQ					0
	(United States) Taylor Beckwith	Yamaha											DNQ	DNQ					DNQ	DNQ					0
	(United States) Scott Iverson	Yamaha											DNQ	DNQ					DNQ	DNQ					0
	(United States) Kyle Hatch	KTM											DNQ	DNQ					DNQ	DNQ					0
	(United States) Conner Lords	KTM													DNQ	DNQ	DNQ	DNQ							0
	(United States) Collin Hinrichs	Kawasaki													DNQ	DNQ	DNQ	DNQ							0
	(United States) Brett Greenley	Honda													DNQ	DNQ							DNQ	DNQ	0
	(United States) Bryce McLaud	Honda													DNQ	DNQ							DNQ	DNQ	0
	(United States) Nick Jones	Honda															DNQ	DNQ					DNQ	DNQ	0
	(United States) Kiliaen van Rensselaer	Triumph																	DNQ	DNQ	DNQ	DNQ			0
	(United States) Bryce Walborn	Kawasaki																	DNQ	DNQ	DNQ	DNQ			0
	(United States) Devin Salo	Yamaha																			DNQ	DNQ	DNQ	DNQ	0
	(United States) Scotty Clark	Honda																			DNQ	DNQ	DNQ	DNQ	0
	(United States) Ty Freehill	Honda	DNQ	DNQ																					0
	(United States) Jimmy Hazel	Kawasaki			DNQ	DNQ																			0
	(United States) Talon Gorman	Honda			DNQ	DNQ																			0
	(United States) Derik Denzin	Yamaha			DNQ	DNQ																			0
	(United States) Shayne Heywood	Yamaha			DNQ	DNQ																			0
	(United States) Italo Vaccaro	KTM			DNQ	DNQ																			0
	(United States) Wyatt Fields	Yamaha			DNQ	DNQ																			0
	(United States) Jonah Schmidt	Yamaha			DNQ	DNQ																			0
	(United States) Eric Rivera	Honda			DNQ	DNQ																			0
	(United States) Jordan Isola	Honda			DNQ	DNQ																			0
	(United States) Cole Shondeck	Gas Gas					DNQ	DNQ																	0
	(United States) Robert Fitch	KTM					DNQ	DNQ																	0
	(United States) John Citrola	Ducati					DNQ	DNQ																	0
	(United States) Deegan VanVreede	KTM					DNQ	DNQ																	0
	(United States) Hayden Morgan	Yamaha					DNQ	DNQ																	0
	(United States) Taylor Jansen	KTM					DNQ	DNQ																	0
	(Canada) Payton Morningstar	KTM							DNQ	DNQ															0
	(United States) Larry Fortin	Gas Gas							DNQ	DNQ															0
	(United States) Cody Penwell	Kawasaki							DNQ	DNQ															0
	(United States) Josh Carson	Kawasaki							DNQ	DNQ															0
	(United States) Joey DeNeen	Yamaha							DNQ	DNQ															0
	(United States) Jason Neidigh	KTM							DNQ	DNQ															0
	(United States) Bryn Steffan	Beta							DNQ	DNQ															0
	(United States) Christopher Blackmer	Yamaha									DNQ	DNQ													0
	(United States) Mick Frantz	Yamaha									DNQ	DNQ													0
	(United States) Jeff Walker	KTM									DNQ	DNQ													0
	(United States) Zane Klemz	KTM									DNQ	DNQ													0
	(Netherlands) Kevin Buitenhuis	Yamaha											DNQ	DNQ											0
	(United States) Johnathan Stasukelis	Husqvarna											DNQ	DNQ											0
	(United States) Travis Randanella	Kawasaki											DNQ	DNQ											0
	(United States) Gage Hulsey	Kawasaki											DNQ	DNQ											0
	(United States) Shane Kelleher	Honda											DNQ	DNQ											0
	(United States) Dylan Moriarty	Husqvarna											DNQ	DNQ											0
	(United States) Jimmy Hebert	Gas Gas											DNQ	DNQ											0
	(United States) Tyler Daniele	KTM											DNQ	DNQ											0
	(United States) Adam Dobrovich	KTM											DNQ	DNQ											0
	(United States) Juan Paul Sanchez	KTM											DNQ	DNQ											0
	(United States) Harris Huizenga	KTM													DNQ	DNQ									0
	(United States) Josh Bowman	KTM													DNQ	DNQ									0
	(United States) Ace Enloe	KTM													DNQ	DNQ									0
	(United States) Travis Prier	Honda													DNQ	DNQ									0
	(United States) Brandon Green	Yamaha													DNQ	DNQ									0
	(United States) Riley Ripper	Husqvarna													DNQ	DNQ									0
	(United States) Kyle Kunstman	Yamaha													DNQ	DNQ									0
	(Canada) Parker Eales	KTM															DNQ	DNQ							0
	(United States) Cameron Russell	Yamaha															DNQ	DNQ							0
	(United States) Grady Spangle	Honda															DNQ	DNQ							0
	(United States) Sebastian Toth	Yamaha															DNQ	DNQ							0
	(United States) Mason Wharton	Kawasaki															DNQ	DNQ							0
	(United States) Chris Cornish	Yamaha															DNQ	DNQ							0
	(United States) Luke Bierek	Yamaha															DNQ	DNQ							0
	(United States) Matt Wilson	Honda															DNQ	DNQ							0
	(United States) Trevor Schmidt	KTM																	DNQ	DNQ					0
	(United States) Tyler Loud	Gas Gas																	DNQ	DNQ					0
	(United States) Paulie Best Jr	KTM																	DNQ	DNQ					0
	(United States) Karson Walter	Yamaha																	DNQ	DNQ					0
	(United States) Matt Vacendak	Husqvarna																	DNQ	DNQ					0
	(United States) Dustin Miller	Yamaha																			DNQ	DNQ			0
	(United States) Michael Lennon	Honda																			DNQ	DNQ			0
	(United States) Eric McKay	Husqvarna																			DNQ	DNQ			0
	(United States) Matthew Hubert	Kawasaki																					DNQ	DNQ	0
	(United States) Dane Morales	Husqvarna																					DNQ	DNQ	0
	(United States) Ryder Thompson	Triumph																					DNQ	DNQ	0
	(United States) Isaac Langston	Gas Gas																					DNQ	DNQ	0
	(United States) Elijah Hall	Honda																					DNQ	DNQ	0
	(United States) Colton Pursley	Yamaha																					DNQ	DNQ	0
Pos	Rider	Bike	FOX (California)		HAN (California)		THU (Colorado)		HIG (Pennsylvania)		RED (Michigan)		SOU (Massachusetts)		SPR (Minnesota)		WAS (Washington (state))		UNA (New York (state))		BUD (Maryland)		IRN (Indiana)		Points

== 250cc ==
=== Entry list ===
Team	Constructor	No	Rider	Rounds
Monster Energy Pro Circuit Kawasaki	Kawasaki	10	(United States) Seth Hammaker	1–4
Monster Energy Pro Circuit Kawasaki	Kawasaki	35	(United States) Drew Adams	3–11
Monster Energy Pro Circuit Kawasaki	Kawasaki	47	(United States) Levi Kitchen	All
Monster Energy Pro Circuit Kawasaki	Kawasaki	92	(United States) Enzo Temmerman	3–4
Monster Energy Pro Circuit Kawasaki	Kawasaki	141	(United States) Nick Romano	1–6
Red Bull KTM Factory Racing	KTM	13	(United States) Julien Beaumer	All
Red Bull KTM Factory Racing	KTM	109	(Belgium) Sacha Coenen	3, 6
ClubMX Yamaha	Yamaha	19	(United States) Max Vohland	1–4
ClubMX Yamaha	Yamaha	22	(United States) Coty Schock	1
ClubMX Yamaha	Yamaha	60	(United States) Hunter Yoder	4–11
ClubMX Yamaha	Yamaha	431	(United States) Ryder Malinoski	10–11
ClubMX Yamaha	Yamaha	507	(United States) Jesson Turner	6, 9–10
Monster Energy Yamaha Star Racing	Yamaha	23	(United States) Michael Mosiman	All
Monster Energy Yamaha Star Racing	Yamaha	25	(United States) Nate Thrasher	1–2, 5–11
Monster Energy Yamaha Star Racing	Yamaha	37	(New Zealand) Cole Davies	All
Monster Energy Yamaha Star Racing	Yamaha	61	(United Kingdom) Max Anstie	1
Monster Energy Yamaha Star Racing	Yamaha	82	(United States) Caden Dudney	All
Monster Energy Yamaha Star Racing	Yamaha	99	(Australia) Kayden Minear	All
Monster Energy Yamaha Star Racing	Yamaha	163	(United States) Pierce Brown	8–11
Monster Energy Yamaha Star Racing	Yamaha	180	(United States) Landen Gordon	1–6, 8–11
Monster Energy Yamaha Star Racing	Yamaha	226	(United States) Carson Wood	3–4, 7
Honda HRC Progressive	Honda	29	(United States) Chance Hymas	All
Honda HRC Progressive	Honda	30	(Japan) Jo Shimoda	1–6
5.11 Triumph Factory Racing Team	Triumph	33	(United States) Austin Forkner	1–3
5.11 Triumph Factory Racing Team	Triumph	74	(United States) Gage Linville	1–4
5.11 Triumph Factory Racing Team	Triumph	199	(United States) Deacon Denno	1–6, 9–10
Rockstar Energy Husqvarna	Husqvarna	34	(United States) Ryder DiFrancesco	All
Rockstar Energy Husqvarna	Husqvarna	58	(United States) Daxton Bennick	1–2, 5–11
Rockstar Energy Husqvarna	Husqvarna	59	(United States) Casey Cochran	1–9
Rockstar Energy Husqvarna	Husqvarna	723	(United States) Landon Gibson	6, 10
Toyota Redlands BarX Yamaha	Yamaha	40	(United States) Parker Ross	All
Toyota Redlands BarX Yamaha	Yamaha	42	(United States) Dilan Schwartz	All
Toyota Redlands BarX Yamaha	Yamaha	43	(United States) Lux Turner	All
Toyota Redlands BarX Yamaha	Yamaha	428	(United States) Preston Boespflug	8
Toyota Redlands BarX Yamaha	Yamaha	443	(United States) Cole Timboe	1–5, 7–11
Phoenix Racing Honda	Honda	49	(United States) Cullin Park	9
Phoenix Racing Honda	Honda	73	(United States) Gavin Towers	All
Phoenix Racing Honda	Honda	486	(United States) Aden Keefer	All
Phoenix Racing Honda	Honda	751	(United States) Evan Ferry	9
MX6 Racing	Kawasaki	53	(United States) Henry Miller	7–11
MX6 Racing	Kawasaki	65	(United States) Marshal Weltin	All
MX6 Racing	Kawasaki	77	(United States) Derek Kelley	1–4
MX6 Racing	Kawasaki	373	(United States) Gavin Betts	1, 9–10
AEO Powersports KTM Racing	KTM	57	(United States) Avery Long	All
AEO Powersports KTM Racing	KTM	71	(United States) Carson Mumford	1–10
AEO Powersports KTM Racing	KTM	378	(United States) Kyle Wise	8
Storm Lake Honda Buddy Brooks Racing	Honda	91	(United States) Izaih Clark	11
Monster Energy Kawasaki Team Green	Kawasaki	92	(United States) Enzo Temmerman	2
Monster Energy Kawasaki Team Green	Kawasaki	270	(United States) Vincent Wey	4
Monster Energy Kawasaki Team Green	Kawasaki	801	(United States) Kade Johnson	4
Fortin Racing	KTM	111	(United States) Larry Fortin	6, 9
Honda Switzerland AGMX Racing	Honda	117	(Switzerland) Tim Jaunin	1–2
3D Racing KTM	KTM	140	(United States) Russell Buccheri	1–10
Quadlock Honda Racing	Honda	144	(New Zealand) Brodie Connolly	5–6, 9–11
Quadlock Honda Racing	Honda	520	(Australia) Alex Larwood	9–11
EBR Family Powersports	Yamaha	146	(United States) Hayes Edwards	3–11
Szestakow Racing	KTM	152	(United States) Cole Szestakow	4–6, 9–11
Americore SBR Husqvarna Racing	Husqvarna	155	(United States) Dylan Cunha	1–2
B&P Racing	KTM	156	(United States) Cade Miller	7
The Law Tigers Privateer Paddock	Yamaha	113	(United States) Braden Spangle	8
The Law Tigers Privateer Paddock	Yamaha	158	(Mexico) Tre Fierro	1–7, 10–11
The Law Tigers Privateer Paddock	Triumph	388	(United States) Brandon Ray	1–2, 8–11
McGinley Clinic Privateer Support Program	Yamaha	159	(United States) Brock Bennett	All
McGinley Clinic Privateer Support Program	KTM	162	(United States) Whispern Smith	11
McGinley Clinic Privateer Support Program	KTM	197	(United States) Brian Saunier	6
McGinley Clinic Privateer Support Program	Honda	251	(United States) Kyle Czworkowski	1, 3–9, 11
McGinley Clinic Privateer Support Program	Yamaha	512	(United States) Austin Cozadd	6
McGinley Clinic Privateer Support Program	Husqvarna	603	(United States) Matt Jackson	4–10
McGinley Clinic Privateer Support Program	Yamaha	951	(United States) Jadyn Serles	All
McGinley Clinic Privateer Support Program	Triumph	990	(Chile) Nico Israel	All
Hoover Racing	Yamaha	172	(United States) Hayden Hoover	4, 11
CT Motosports	KTM	192	(United States) Cameron Harrison	5, 7
Sun Powersports	Honda	198	(United States) John Douglas	3, 7
WarriorMX	Husqvarna	201	(United States) Timothy Barnum	1, 8
ThirtyOne3 Cycles	Husqvarna	203	(United States) Andrew Boccarossa	4, 6, 9
Albano Racing	Yamaha	205	(United States) Thomas Albano	6
	KTM	236	(United States) Austin Schafer	10
Raymond Racing	Gas Gas	239	(United States) Bryson Raymond	3, 5, 9–11
The Cutting Edge Racing	KTM	244	(United States) Evan Snowdin	11
Kortenbach Racing	KTM	247	(Canada) Tegan Kortenbach	4, 10–11
Edwards Racing	Yamaha	248	(United States) Clay Edwards	7, 11
Dörr Motorsport Triumph Racing	Triumph	250	(Germany) Jan Krug	6
Lahman Racing	Yamaha	252	(United States) Zach Lahman	4
Talon Schwall Racing	Yamaha	263	(United States) Talon Schwall	5, 7
Primo Racing Concept	Triumph	265	(United States) Devin Ruth	1–2
Honda of the Ozarks	Honda	266	(United States) Brett Greenley	5
Action Extreme Sports	KTM	277	(United States) Trevor Maley	4–5, 9–10
Burns Racing	Kawasaki	283	(United States) Collin Burns	1
	Yamaha	287	(United States) Devin Salo	5
Team VENUM BUD Racing Kawasaki	Kawasaki	290	(Spain) Francisco García	6
Team VENUM BUD Racing Kawasaki	Kawasaki	303	(Australia) Jake Cannon	6
Crestview Construction	Husqvarna	294	(United States) Nick McDonnell	6, 9
HBI Racing	Yamaha	298	(United States) Joey De Santi	1–6, 9–11
HBI Racing	KTM	518	(United States) Matthew Mowery	1–3, 5
US 27 Motorsports	Beta	299	(United States) Konnor Visger	8–11
BWR	Husqvarna	300	(United States) Jonathan Getz	1–2, 5–6, 9
SLR Honda	Honda	301	(United States) Alvin Hillan	2, 9–10
SLR Honda	Honda	348	(United States) Cade Bradley	9–10
Sunbeam Racing Yamaha	Yamaha	313	(United States) Travis Beam	4–5, 7, 10–11
Stepek Logistics	Yamaha	314	(United States) Tyler Stepek	9
MPS Enterprise/McGinley Clinic/Ryan's Cardhouse	Honda	316	(United States) Ty Freehill	2–5, 8
Geppert Racing	KTM	320	(United States) Cooper Geppert	4
Team Pointview Cycle KTM	KTM	323	(United States) Micah Grubbs	9
Mid-American Salt/Adventure Moto	Gas Gas	335	(United States) Thor Powell	10–11
McGrath Racing	Husqvarna	338	(United States) Wyatt McGrath	7
Mosites Motorsports	Kawasaki	347	(United States) Reece Wheaton	3–5, 7, 10–11
Gizmo Yamaha Racing	Yamaha	352	(United States) Bronson McClure	3, 11
Gizmo Yamaha Racing	Yamaha	759	(United States) Krystian Janik	6–11
Gizmo Yamaha Racing	Yamaha	775	(United States) CJ Benard	1–5, 7–8
Gizmo Yamaha Racing	Yamaha	900	(United States) Keegan Rowley	1–5, 10–11
McCauley Racing	Yamaha	367	(United States) Christian McCauley	4, 9, 11
Werks Triumph Racing	Triumph	369	(United States) Nicholas Hunt	1–7, 9–11
Haynes Racing	Kawasaki	371	(United States) Chase Haynes	1–2
MX101 FXR Yamaha	Yamaha	380	(United States) Preston Kilroy	11
Motorbikes Plus/James Heinz Racing	Husqvarna	389	(United States) Grantly Carter	6
Maslak Racing	Yamaha	392	(United States) Pawel Maslak	6
Austin Racing	KTM	405	(United States) Colton Austin	10–11
Walker Racing	KTM	406	(United States) Jacob Walker	6
RPM KTM Racing Team	KTM	410	(United States) Noah Gordon	1–2
RPM KTM Racing Team	KTM	436	(United States) JJ Concannon	8
RPM KTM Racing Team	KTM	539	(United States) Cole Zeller	1, 6
Big Daddy Racing	Husqvarna	413	(United States) Austin Brooks	6
Roseville Motorsports Racing	Kawasaki	416	(United States) Nate Freehill	2, 10–11
Looney Racing	Triumph	430	(United States) Kyle Looney	1–3, 5, 7–8
HOP Racing	Yamaha	440	(United States) Austin Kapoukranidis	5–6
KTM USA	KTM	462	(United States) Luke Fauser	4
PeeWeecycle.com/PW50 Parts	Gas Gas	468	(United States) Cale Kuchnicki	10
Reilly Racing	KTM	471	(United States) Lucas Reilly	4, 6, 9–10
Pelotte Racing	KTM	478	(United States) Trevor Pelotte	6
Peccarelli Racing	Kawasaki	505	(United States) Nick Peccarelli	4–6, 9–10
	KTM	515	(United States) Brodie Boumeester	7
Team Moto Academy	KTM	524	(United States) Ty Lepicier	6
Privateer Connection Screaming Chicken Racing	Yamaha	545	(United States) Seth Shirley	9–11
Bader Racing	KTM	553	(United States) Cole Bader	4, 9
Lima Racing	Kawasaki	555	(Brazil) Heberton Lima	6
CNC Metal Masters	Yamaha	559	(United States) Joseph Shipley	10–11
Murdoch Racing	Kawasaki	560	(United States) Kyle Murdoch	6
Dirt Care USA	KTM	575	(United States) TJ Lanphear	4, 6
Fast Forward Racing	Kawasaki	577	(United States) Logan Forward	9
US 27 Motorsports/iSchuring Racing	Yamaha	587	(United States) Noah Schuring	All
Bowman Racing	KTM	592	(United States) Josh Bowman	11
Western Ag	Yamaha	612	(United States) Logan Edwards	2, 10–11
Priority MX Thor Gas Gas Racing Team	Gas Gas	613	(Canada) Cole Pranger	10–11
Arsen Performance	Yamaha	614	(United States) Brandon Nolan	6, 9
Ajax 405 Race Team	Husqvarna	615	(United States) Bayler McKellar	7, 10–11
	Yamaha	616	(United States) Isaac Juergens	10–11
Andreis Racing	Gas Gas	632	(Austria) Alex Andreis	1
Southeast Sales	Kawasaki	646	(United States) Elijah Tetzlaff	5, 7, 11
Hazlett Racing	Kawasaki	650	(United States) Trevor Hazlett	4–5, 9
Loud Racing	KTM	655	(United States) Tyler Loud	6
Stempel Racing	Husqvarna	664	(United States) Hunter Stempel	6, 9
Millikan Racing	Yamaha	674	(United States) Carson Millikan	1
Fitch Racing Inc	Yamaha	676	(United States) Robert Fitch	5
Hunter Racing MX	Kawasaki	708	(United States) Will Canaguier	10
TB Racing	Yamaha	729	(United States) Trey Beisheim	4, 9
HVR Powersports	KTM	736	(United States) Jace Allred	1–3, 8
Fappani Racing	KTM	752	(United States) Jeremy Fappani	1–4
	Yamaha	759	(United States) Krystian Janik	5
Harrington Racing	KTM	777	(United States) James Harrington	3–7, 9–10
Lorusso Racing	Yamaha	778	(United States) Tony Lorusso	6
Forsberg Racing	Triumph	779	(United States) Chase Forsberg	2, 8
Hinrichs Racing	Yamaha	795	(United States) Jace Hinrichs	1–3, 7, 11
CDF/Aqua Pools/KTM Racing	KTM	800	(Canada) Preston Masciangelo	1–6, 9, 11
Wildcat Race Team	Gas Gas	809	(United States) Brayden Ehlermann	All
Williams Racing	Suzuki	811	(United States) Chris Williams	8
Templen Racing	KTM	813	(United States) Gavin Templen	5, 7, 11
VanVreede Racing	KTM	819	(United States) Deegan VanVreede	5, 7, 11
Orange MX Racing	KTM	820	(United States) Clayton Stockstill	10
RockRiver/FXR/Gizmo Mods	Yamaha	826	(United States) Talan Zollers	5, 7, 11
Boss Suspension	Yamaha	827	(United States) Blake Ovitt	6
Partzilla Blaster PRMX Racing	Kawasaki	832	(United States) Leum Oehlhof	8–11
Limited Decal	Gas Gas	857	(United States) Cory Rogers	6, 9–10
737 Performance MotoSource	KTM	872	(France) Mathys Boisramé	1–2
Schroeder Racing	KTM	889	(United States) Christopher Schroeder	5, 7, 11
Burns Racing	KTM	907	(United States) Carson Burns	2, 8
909 Motors	Honda	909	(United States) Ryan Wadsworth	6
Jackman Racing	KTM	923	(United States) Cohen Jackman	1–3, 8
HRT	Kawasaki	924	(United States) Gage Hulsey	7–11
S. Nettleton & Son Racing	KTM	928	(United States) Mason Nettleton	10
Storm Lake Honda	Honda	942	(United States) Deegan Hepp	5
Neff Racing	Suzuki	959	(United States) Axel Neff	4, 7, 9–11
Monty's Motorsports Smokin Joes Racing	Gas Gas	962	(United States) Joe Tait	6
Ryan Langan Racing	Yamaha	967	(United States) Ryan Langan	4, 6
Triple J Racing	KTM	999	(United States) Jesse Jacobsen	1–5, 7–8

=== Riders Championship ===
Pos	Rider	Bike	FOX (California)		HAN (California)		THU (Colorado)		HIG (Pennsylvania)		RED (Michigan)		SOU (Massachusetts)		SPR (Minnesota)		WAS (Washington (state))		UNA (New York (state))		BUD (Maryland)		IRN (Indiana)		Points
1	(New Zealand) Cole Davies	Yamaha	3	8	11	1	6	15	1	1	1	2	7	2	Ret	13	1	1	2	1	1	3	3	13	407
2	(United States) Julien Beaumer	KTM	11	2	4	3	7	4	2	2	15	18	4	5	1	4	8	5	9	13	8	4	2	1	369
3	(United States) Levi Kitchen	Kawasaki	1	13	2	2	1	8	6	5	4	5	2	4	8	2	6	6	1	6	14	2	Ret	DNS	364
4	(United States) Chance Hymas	Honda	10	5	5	12	20	13	13	8	8	6	5	7	9	1	3	3	4	2	2	1	1	2	364
5	(United States) Ryder DiFrancesco	Husqvarna	19	3	12	8	9	3	7	6	6	3	3	24	6	11	2	2	5	3	6	25	7	3	327
6	(Australia) Kayden Minear	Yamaha	15	10	6	13	13	6	10	3	9	9	6	3	3	6	9	10	14	14	5	10	8	8	297
7	(United States) Carson Mumford	KTM	12	9	8	11	18	16	Ret	7	11	7	10	11	11	3	5	4	3	4	4	Ret			244
8	(Japan) Jo Shimoda	Honda	4	7	3	6	3	2	3	4	3	1	DNS	DNS											194
9	(United States) Michael Mosiman	Yamaha	25	23	28	7	5	14	9	9 (Note: Mosiman was docked 5 championship points for jumping on a red cross flag.)	30	8	12	12	2	Ret	17	16	18	8	29	6	10	9	187
10	(United States) Drew Adams	Kawasaki					26	23	14	15	12	16	16	9	7	7	12	11	7	9	17	5	9	5	181
11	(United States) Nate Thrasher	Yamaha	9	Ret	14	Ret					10	10	11	6	4	17	7	8	10	12	23	14	15	4	179
12	(United States) Caden Dudney	Yamaha	6	4	22	20	8	18	8	17	2	12	14	Ret	Ret	DNS	DNS	DNS	6	11	10	8	16	20	174
13	(United States) Dilan Schwartz	Yamaha	17	Ret	17	14	12	Ret	12	10	16	14	22	Ret	10	8	10	9	11	15	11	32	13	11	164
14	(United States) Landen Gordon	Yamaha	14	16	19	22	15	7	15	16	17	15	Ret	DNS			16	15	12	23	3	7	5	6	155
15	(United States) Casey Cochran	Husqvarna	Ret	17	15	Ret	11	20	4	11	5	4	8	16	Ret	9	13	7	Ret	DNS					146
16	(United States) Daxton Bennick	Husqvarna	7	Ret	13	Ret					14	11	25	Ret	5	10	4	18	27	DNS	9	11	4	16	142
17	(United States) Lux Turner	Yamaha	8	6	Ret	19	21	17	11	12	Ret	21	Ret	21	15	5	14	19	Ret	19	7	9	12	19	141
18	(United States) Seth Hammaker	Kawasaki	2	1	1	9	2	12	5	Ret															134
19	(United States) Nick Romano	Kawasaki	5	11	7	4	4	5	17	22	7	25	DNS	DNS											116
20	(United States) Avery Long	KTM	20	25	26	21	23	27	28	23	20	Ret	18	18	12	12	19	14	15	18	21	12	11	15	84
21	(Belgium) Sacha Coenen	KTM					14	1					1	1											83
22	(United States) Marshal Weltin	Kawasaki	23	18	24	15	25	25	20	20	19	17	DNQ	15	Ret	14	15	12	13	26	18	31	Ret	17	73
23	(United States) Hunter Yoder	Yamaha							25	21	Ret	19	15	Ret	14	16	11	13	22	16	13	18	14	Ret	72
24	(United States) Pierce Brown	Yamaha															Ret	17	17	7	16	16	6	7	68
25	(United States) Deacon Denno	Triumph	18	20	16	10	16	9	16	Ret	13	13	Ret	DNS					30	Ret	Ret	DNS			67
26	(United States) Max Vohland	Yamaha	13	12	9	5	17	19	Ret	DNS															57
27	(New Zealand) Brodie Connolly	Honda									24	22	Ret	Ret					8	5	Ret	Ret	18	18	39
28	(United States) Parker Ross	Yamaha	22	Ret	21	18	28	32	24	14	18	20	17	17	13	Ret	Ret	Ret	29	22	24	23	29	21	39
29	(United States) Carson Wood	Yamaha					27	10	18	13					23	15									32
30	(United States) Landon Gibson	Husqvarna											20	10							12	15			31
31	(Australia) Alex Larwood	Honda																	16	10	Ret	21	20	12	31
32	(United States) Enzo Temmerman	Kawasaki			10	17	10	21	Ret	DNS															30
33	(United States) Derek Kelley	Kawasaki	21	15	Ret	16	19	11	26	Ret															28
34	(Spain) Francisco García	Kawasaki											9	8											27
35	(United States) Henry Miller	Kawasaki													17	26	18	22	23	21	15	13	Ret	Ret	26
36	(United States) Gavin Towers	Honda	31	21	Ret	Ret	32	DNS	19	Ret	21	24	13	30	18	20	24	20	21	Ret	Ret	19	25	22	26
37	(United States) Ryder Malinoski	Yamaha																			19	22	19	10	18
38	(United States) Brock Bennett	Husqvarna	24	19	25	25	38	24	DNQ	27	29	26	DNQ	DNQ	20	18	21	Ret	26	31	28	17	24	Ret	15
39	(United States) Jesson Turner	Yamaha											27	13					19	20	26	Ret			14
40	(United States) Preston Kilroy	Yamaha																					17	14	13
41	(United States) Russell Buccheri	KTM	30	34	DNQ	30	30	31	30	31	27	30	19	19	19	23	26	27	34	28	20	Ret			11
42	(United States) Cole Timboe	Yamaha	28	27	Ret	Ret	31	30	Ret	25 (Note: Timboe was docked 5 championship points for jumping on a red cross flag.)	32	Ret			16	22	34	21	20	17	DNQ	DNQ	Ret	23	9
43	(France) Mathys Boisramé	KTM	26	14	23	33																			8
44	(Australia) Jake Cannon	Kawasaki											Ret	14											8
45	(United States) Coty Schock	Yamaha	16	22																					6
46	(United States) Vincent Wey	Kawasaki							22	18															4
47	(United States) Austin Forkner	Triumph	Ret	29	18	26	DNS	DNS																	4
48	(United States) Hayes Edwards	Yamaha					Ret	35	DNQ	36	23	35	30	20	21	21	37	DNS	DNQ	DNQ	27	Ret	23	25	4
49	(United States) CJ Benard	Yamaha	DNQ	DNQ	30	24	24	28	35	28	34	29			24	19	23	23							3
50	(United States) Kade Johnson	Kawasaki							27	19															3
51	(United States) Gavin Betts	Kawasaki	33	32															24	24	DNQ	20			2
52	(United States) Preston Boespflug	Yamaha															20	30							2
53	(United States) Leum Oehlhof	Kawasaki															22	26	32	25	22	24	21	27	1
54	(United States) Kyle Murdoch	Kawasaki											21	22											1
	(United States) Jadyn Serles	Yamaha	DNQ	DNQ	DNQ	DNQ	DNQ	DNQ	31	35	DNQ	DNQ	DNQ	DNQ	22	24	25	29	37	29	DNQ	DNQ	DNQ	DNQ	0
	(United States) Jonathan Getz	Husqvarna	29	DNS	Ret	DNS					22	33	24	Ret					DNQ	DNQ					0
	(United States) Gage Linville	Triumph	32	28	27	23	29	26	23	29															0
	(United States) James Harrington	KTM					DNQ	DNQ	DNQ	DNQ	26	28	23	26	25	28			DNQ	DNQ	DNQ	DNQ			0
	(United States) Aden Keefer	Honda	DNQ	DNQ	31	27	34	34	Ret	32	31	27	Ret	23	26	27	28	Ret	Ret	27	Ret	28	34	30	0
	(United States) Krystian Janik	Yamaha									25	31	26	25	Ret	Ret	27	24	DNQ	DNQ	Ret	Ret	Ret	26	0
	(United States) Devin Ruth	Triumph	35	24	DNQ	DNQ																			0
	(United States) Austin Schafer	KTM																			25	26			0
	(United States) Brayden Ehlermann	Gas Gas	DNQ	DNQ	DNQ	DNQ	DNQ	DNQ	34	33	DNQ	DNQ	DNQ	DNQ	27	25	DNQ	DNQ	DNQ	DNQ	DNQ	DNQ	DNQ	28	0
	(United States) Brandon Ray	Triumph	Ret	33	29	29											30	25	28	Ret	DNQ	DNQ	27	Ret	0
	(United States) Cullin Park	Honda																	25	Ret					0
	(United States) Nate Freehill	Kawasaki			35	32															DNQ	27	26	Ret	0
	(United States) Cole Zeller	KTM	DNQ	31									28	27											0
	(United States) Jace Allred	KTM	34	30	34	31	36	Ret									29	28							0
	(United States) Larry Fortin	KTM											31	28					DNQ	33					0
	(United States) Jesse Jacobsen	KTM	DNQ	DNQ	DNQ	DNQ	35	36	DNQ	DNQ	DNQ	DNQ			28	32	DNQ	DNQ							0
	(Chile) Nico Israel	Triumph	DNQ	DNQ	DNQ	DNQ	37	Ret	DNQ	DNQ	Ret	DNS	DNQ	34	29	DNS	31	32	DNQ	DNQ	30	29	DNQ	DNQ	0
	(United States) Joe Tait	Gas Gas											29	29											0
	(Mexico) Tre Fierro	Yamaha	DNQ	35	DNQ	DNQ	DNQ	DNQ	DNQ	DNQ	DNQ	DNQ	DNQ	31	32	29					DNQ	DNQ	32	31	0
	(United States) Alvin Hillan	Honda			33	34													31	30	Ret	DNS			0
	(United States) Bayler McKellar	Husqvarna													31	30					DNQ	DNQ	33	34	0
	(United States) Luke Fauser	KTM							33	30															0
	(United States) Reece Wheaton	Kawasaki					DNQ	DNQ	DNQ	DNQ	35	34			30	36					DNQ	DNQ	DNQ	DNQ	0
	(United States) Bryson Raymond	Gas Gas					DNQ	DNQ			DNQ	DNQ							DNQ	DNQ	DNQ	30	DNQ	DNQ	0
	(United States) Josh Bowman	KTM																					31	32	0
	(United States) Cohen Jackman	KTM	DNQ	DNQ	DNQ	DNQ	DNQ	DNQ									33	31							0
	(United States) Wyatt McGrath	Husqvarna													34	31									0
	(United States) Cole Szestakow	KTM							DNQ	DNQ	DNQ	DNQ	32	32					DNQ	DNQ	DNQ	DNQ	DNQ	DNQ	0
	(United States) JJ Concannon	KTM															32	33							0
	(United States) Cade Bradley	Honda																	36	32	Ret	DNS			0
	(United States) TJ Lanphear	KTM							DNQ	DNQ			33	33											0
	(United States) Christopher Schroeder	KTM									36	36			33	34							DNQ	DNQ	0
	(United States) Thor Powell	Gas Gas																			Ret	33	28	33	0
	(United States) Deegan VanVreede	KTM									DNQ	DNQ			DNQ	33							DNQ	DNQ	0
	(United States) Kyle Wise	KTM															35	34							0
	(United States) Jace Hinrichs	Yamaha	DNQ	DNQ	DNQ	DNQ	DNQ	DNQ							Ret	Ret							DNQ	DNQ	0
	(United States) Evan Ferry	Honda																	35	DNS					0
	(United States) Kyle Looney	Triumph	DNQ	DNQ	DNQ	DNQ	DNQ	DNQ			DNQ	DNQ			DNQ	DNQ	DNQ	35							0
	(United States) Nicholas Hunt	Triumph	DNQ	DNQ	DNQ	DNQ	DNQ	DNQ	DNQ	DNQ	DNQ	DNQ	DNQ	DNQ	DNQ	DNQ			DNQ	35	DNQ	DNQ	DNQ	DNQ	0
	(United States) Axel Neff	Suzuki							DNQ	DNQ					DNQ	35			DNQ	DNQ	DNQ	DNQ	DNQ	DNQ	0
	(United States) Dylan Cunha	Husqvarna	36	Ret	DNQ	DNQ																			0
	(United States) Braden Spangle	Yamaha															38	36							0
	(United States) Ty Freehill	Honda			DNQ	DNQ	DNQ	DNQ	DNQ	DNQ	DNQ	DNQ					36	Ret							0
	(United States) Bronson McClure	Yamaha					Ret	37															DNQ	DNQ	0
	(United States) Will Canaguier	Kawasaki																			Ret	Ret			0
	(United Kingdom) Max Anstie	Yamaha	Ret	DNS																					0
	(United States) Trevor Maley	KTM							DNQ	DNQ	DNQ	37							DNQ	DNQ	DNQ	DNQ			0
	(United States) Trevor Hazlett	Kawasaki							DNQ	DNQ	Ret	38							DNQ	DNQ					0
	(United States) Izaih Clark	Honda																					Ret	Ret	0
	(Germany) Jan Krug	Triumph											Ret	DNS											0
	(United States) Jeremy Fappani	KTM	27	26	20	Ret	22	22	21	24 (Note: Fappani was docked 5 championship points for jumping on a red cross flag.)															-2
	(Canada) Preston Masciangelo	KTM	DNQ	DNQ	32	28	33	29	29	26	28	23	DNQ	DNQ					33	34			22	24	-5
	(United States) Keegan Rowley	Yamaha	DNQ	DNQ	DNQ	DNQ	DNQ	33	32	34 (Note: Rowley was docked 5 championship points for jumping on a red cross flag.)	33	32									DNQ	DNQ	30	29	-5
	(United States) Noah Schuring	Yamaha	DNQ	DNQ	DNQ	DNQ	DNQ	DNQ	DNQ	DNQ	DNQ	DNQ	DNQ	DNQ	DNQ	DNQ	DNQ	DNQ	DNQ	DNQ	DNQ	DNQ	DNQ	DNQ	0
	(United States) Joey De Santi	Yamaha	DNQ	DNQ	DNQ	DNQ	DNQ	DNQ	DNQ	DNQ	DNQ	DNQ	DNQ	DNQ					DNQ	DNQ	DNQ	DNQ	DNQ	DNQ	0
	(United States) Kyle Czworkowski	Honda	DNQ	DNQ			DNQ	DNQ	DNQ	DNQ	DNQ	DNQ	DNQ	DNQ	DNQ	DNQ	DNQ	DNQ	DNQ	DNQ			DNQ	DNQ	0
	(United States) Matt Jackson	Husqvarna							DNQ	DNQ	DNQ	DNQ	DNQ	DNQ	DNQ	DNQ	DNQ	DNQ	DNQ	DNQ	DNQ	DNQ			0
	(United States) Nick Peccarelli	Kawasaki							DNQ	DNQ	DNQ	DNQ	DNQ	DNQ					DNQ	DNQ	DNQ	DNQ			0
	(United States) Travis Beam	Yamaha							DNQ	DNQ	DNQ	DNQ			DNQ	DNQ					DNQ	DNQ	DNQ	DNQ	0
	(United States) Gage Hulsey	Kawasaki													DNQ	DNQ	DNQ	DNQ	DNQ	DNQ	DNQ	DNQ	DNQ	DNQ	0
	(United States) Matthew Mowery	KTM	DNQ	DNQ	DNQ	DNQ	DNQ	DNQ			DNQ	DNQ													0
	(United States) Lucas Reilly	KTM							DNQ	DNQ			DNQ	DNQ					DNQ	DNQ	DNQ	DNQ			0
	(United States) Konnor Visger	Beta															DNQ	DNQ	DNQ	DNQ	DNQ	DNQ	DNQ	DNQ	0
	(United States) Logan Edwards	Yamaha			DNQ	DNQ															DNQ	DNQ	DNQ	DNQ	0
	(United States) Andrew Boccarossa	Husqvarna							DNQ	DNQ			DNQ	DNQ					DNQ	DNQ					0
	(United States) Christian McCauley	Yamaha							DNQ	DNQ									DNQ	DNQ			DNQ	DNQ	0
	(Canada) Tegan Kortenbach	KTM							DNQ	DNQ											DNQ	DNQ	DNQ	DNQ	0
	(United States) Talan Zollers	Yamaha									DNQ	DNQ			DNQ	DNQ							DNQ	DNQ	0
	(United States) Elijah Tetzlaff	Kawasaki									DNQ	DNQ			DNQ	DNQ							DNQ	DNQ	0
	(United States) Gavin Templen	KTM									DNQ	DNQ			DNQ	DNQ							DNQ	DNQ	0
	(United States) Cory Rogers	Gas Gas											DNQ	DNQ					DNQ	DNQ	DNQ	DNQ			0
	(United States) Seth Shirley	Yamaha																	DNQ	DNQ	DNQ	DNQ	DNQ	DNQ	0
	(United States) Chase Haynes	Kawasaki	DNQ	DNQ	DNQ	DNQ																			0
	(United States) Noah Gordon	KTM	DNQ	DNQ	DNQ	DNQ																			0
	(Switzerland) Tim Jaunin	Honda	DNQ	DNQ	DNQ	DNQ																			0
	(United States) Timothy Barnum	Husqvarna	DNQ	DNQ													DNQ	DNQ							0
	(United States) Carson Burns	KTM			DNQ	DNQ											DNQ	DNQ							0
	(United States) Chase Forsberg	Triumph			DNQ	DNQ											DNQ	DNQ							0
	(United States) John Douglas	Honda					DNQ	DNQ							DNQ	DNQ									0
	(United States) Ryan Langan	Yamaha							DNQ	DNQ			DNQ	DNQ											0
	(United States) Trey Beisheim	Yamaha							DNQ	DNQ									DNQ	DNQ					0
	(United States) Cole Bader	KTM							DNQ	DNQ									DNQ	DNQ					0
	(United States) Hayden Hoover	Yamaha							DNQ	DNQ													DNQ	DNQ	0
	(United States) Austin Kapoukranidis	Yamaha									DNQ	DNQ	DNQ	DNQ											0
	(United States) Cameron Harrison	KTM									DNQ	DNQ			DNQ	DNQ									0
	(United States) Talon Schwall	Yamaha									DNQ	DNQ			DNQ	DNQ									0
	(United States) Nick McDonnell	Husqvarna											DNQ	DNQ					DNQ	DNQ					0
	(United States) Brandon Nolan	Yamaha											DNQ	DNQ					DNQ	DNQ					0
	(United States) Hunter Stempel	Husqvarna											DNQ	DNQ					DNQ	DNQ					0
	(United States) Clay Edwards	Yamaha													DNQ	DNQ							DNQ	DNQ	0
	(Canada) Cole Pranger	Gas Gas																			DNQ	DNQ	DNQ	DNQ	0
	(United States) Joseph Shipley	Yamaha																			DNQ	DNQ	DNQ	DNQ	0
	(United States) Colton Austin	KTM																			DNQ	DNQ	DNQ	DNQ	0
	(United States) Isaac Juergens	Yamaha																			DNQ	DNQ	DNQ	DNQ	0
	(United States) Collin Burns	Kawasaki	DNQ	DNQ																					0
	(Austria) Alex Andreis	Gas Gas	DNQ	DNQ																					0
	(United States) Carson Millikan	Yamaha	DNQ	DNQ																					0
	(United States) Cooper Geppert	KTM							DNQ	DNQ															0
	(United States) Zach Lahman	Yamaha							DNQ	DNQ															0
	(United States) Deegan Hepp	Honda									DNQ	DNQ													0
	(United States) Brett Greenley	Honda									DNQ	DNQ													0
	(United States) Robert Fitch	Yamaha									DNQ	DNQ													0
	(United States) Devin Salo	Yamaha									DNQ	DNQ													0
	(United States) Tony Lorusso	Yamaha											DNQ	DNQ											0
	(United States) Grantly Carter	Husqvarna											DNQ	DNQ											0
	(United States) Pawel Maslak	Yamaha											DNQ	DNQ											0
	(United States) Ty Lepicier	KTM											DNQ	DNQ											0
	(United States) Jacob Walker	KTM											DNQ	DNQ											0
	(United States) Blake Ovitt	Yamaha											DNQ	DNQ											0
	(United States) Austin Cozadd	Yamaha											DNQ	DNQ											0
	(United States) Ryan Wadsworth	Honda											DNQ	DNQ											0
	(United States) Tyler Loud	KTM											DNQ	DNQ											0
	(United States) Austin Brooks	Husqvarna											DNQ	DNQ											0
	(United States) Thomas Albano	Yamaha											DNQ	DNQ											0
	(United States) Trevor Pelotte	KTM											DNQ	DNQ											0
	(United States) Brian Saunier	KTM											DNQ	DNQ											0
	(United States) Heberton Lima	Kawasaki											DNQ	DNQ											0
	(United States) Cade Miller	KTM													DNQ	DNQ									0
	(United States) Brodie Boumeester	KTM													DNQ	DNQ									0
	(United States) Chris Williams	Suzuki															DNQ	DNQ							0
	(United States) Tyler Stepek	Yamaha																	DNQ	DNQ					0
	(United States) Logan Forward	Kawasaki																	DNQ	DNQ					0
	(United States) Micah Grubbs	KTM																	DNQ	DNQ					0
	(United States) Clayton Stockstill	KTM																			DNQ	DNQ			0
	(United States) Mason Nettleton	KTM																			DNQ	DNQ			0
	(United States) Cale Kuchnicki	Gas Gas																			DNQ	DNQ			0
	(United States) Evan Snowdin	KTM																					DNQ	DNQ	0
	(United States) Whispern Smith	KTM																					DNQ	DNQ	0
Pos	Rider	Bike	FOX (California)		HAN (California)		THU (Colorado)		HIG (Pennsylvania)		RED (Michigan)		SOU (Massachusetts)		SPR (Minnesota)		WAS (Washington (state))		UNA (New York (state))		BUD (Maryland)		IRN (Indiana)		Points
