= 2023 SuperMotocross World Championship =

Motorcycle racing competition

The 2023 SuperMotocross World Championship was the inaugural edition of the premier combined discipline off-road motorcycle racing competition, held in the United States. Combining the AMA Supercross Championship and the AMA Motocross Championship, along with three final SuperMotocross rounds, the total length of the series ran from January to September.

== 2023 AMA Supercross Championship ==
2023 AMA Supercross Championship
- Organizer: American Motorcyclist Association, Feld Entertainment (except Daytona), NASCAR Holdings, Inc. (Daytona)
- Discipline: Supercross
- Duration: January – May 2023
- Number of races: 17
- TV partners: NBC Sports (NBC, USA Network, CNBC, Peacock)

Seasons
- ← 2022 2024 →

The 2023 AMA Supercross Championship was the 50th season of off-road stadium motorcycle racing in the United States. Comprising 17 rounds, the series ran from January until May, crowning supercross champions in both the 250cc and 450cc classes, concluding with the Salt Lake City round on May 13.

2023 Monster Energy AMA Supercross Championship
Round (250 East/West)	Date	Location	Stadium	Live Broadcast	450cc Winner	250cc Winner
1 (W)	January 7	(California) Anaheim	Angel Stadium	Peacock, USA	(United States) Eli Tomac	(Australia) Jett Lawrence
2 (W)	January 21	(California) San Diego	Snapdragon Stadium	Peacock	(United States) Eli Tomac	(Australia) Jett Lawrence
3 (W)	January 28	(California) Anaheim 2	Angel Stadium	Peacock	(United States) Chase Sexton	(United States) Levi Kitchen
4 (E)	February 4	(Texas) Houston	NRG Stadium	Peacock	(United States) Eli Tomac	(Australia) Hunter Lawrence
5 (E)	February 11	(Florida) Tampa Bay	Raymond James Stadium	Peacock	(United States) Cooper Webb	(Australia) Hunter Lawrence
6 (W)	February 18	(California) Oakland	Ring Central Coliseum	Peacock	(United States) Eli Tomac	(Australia) Jett Lawrence
7 (E)	February 25	(Texas) Arlington	AT&T Stadium	Peacock	(United States) Cooper Webb	(United States) Nate Thrasher
8 (E)	March 4	(Florida) Daytona	Daytona International Speedway	Peacock	(United States) Eli Tomac	(Australia) Hunter Lawrence
9 (E)	March 11	(Indiana) Indianapolis	Lucas Oil Stadium	Peacock	(Germany) Ken Roczen	(Australia) Hunter Lawrence
10 (E)	March 18	(Michigan) Detroit	Ford Field	Peacock	(United States) Chase Sexton	(Australia) Hunter Lawrence
11 (W)	March 25	(Washington (state)) Seattle	Lumen Field	Peacock	(United States) Eli Tomac	(Australia) Jett Lawrence
12 (W)	April 8	(Arizona) Glendale	State Farm Stadium	Peacock	(United States) Eli Tomac	(Australia) Jett Lawrence
13 (E)	April 15	(Georgia (U.S. state)) Hampton	Atlanta Motor Speedway	Peacock, NBC	(United States) Chase Sexton	(Australia) Hunter Lawrence
14 (E/W)	April 22	(New Jersey) East Rutherford	MetLife Stadium	Peacock	(United States) Justin Barcia	(United Kingdom) Max Anstie
15 (E)	April 29	(Tennessee) Nashville	Nissan Stadium	Peacock, NBC	(United States) Chase Sexton	(Australia) Hunter Lawrence
16 (W)	May 6	(Colorado) Denver	Empower Field at Mile High	Peacock	(United States) Chase Sexton	(United States) RJ Hampshire
17 (E/W)	May 13	(Utah) Salt Lake City	Rice-Eccles Stadium	Peacock, USA	(United States) Chase Sexton	(Australia) Jett Lawrence

== 2023 AMA Motocross Championship ==
2023 AMA Motocross Championship
- Organizer: American Motorcyclist Association
- Discipline: Motocross
- Duration: May – August 2023
- Number of races: 11
- TV partners: NBC Sports (NBC, USA Network, CNBC, Peacock)

The 2023 AMA Motocross Championship was the 52nd season of the premier off-road motocross racing series in the United States. Comprising eleven rounds across three months from late May until August, the series crowned champions in both 250cc and 450cc classes.

2023 Lucas Oil Pro Motocross Championship
Round	Date	Event	Racetrack	Live Broadcast	250cc Winner	450cc Winner
1	May 27	(California) Fox Raceway National	Fox Raceway	Peacock	(Australia) Hunter Lawrence	(Australia) Jett Lawrence
2	June 3	(California) Hangtown Classic	Hangtown	Peacock	(Australia) Hunter Lawrence	(Australia) Jett Lawrence
3	June 10	(Colorado) Thunder Valley National	Thunder Valley	Peacock	(Australia) Hunter Lawrence	(Australia) Jett Lawrence
4	June 17	(Pennsylvania) High Point National	High Point	Peacock	(United States) RJ Hampshire	(Australia) Jett Lawrence
5	July 1	(Michigan) Red Bud National	RedBud	Peacock	(United States) Haiden Deegan	(Australia) Jett Lawrence
6	July 8	(Massachusetts) Southwick National	Southwick MX	Peacock, NBC	(France) Tom Vialle	(Australia) Jett Lawrence
7	July 15	(Minnesota) Spring Creek National	Spring Creek	Peacock	(Australia) Hunter Lawrence	(Australia) Jett Lawrence
8	July 22	(Washington (state)) Washougal National	Washougal MX	Peacock	(United States) Haiden Deegan	(Australia) Jett Lawrence
9	August 12	(New York (state)) Unadilla National	Unadilla	Peacock, NBC	(Australia) Hunter Lawrence	(Australia) Jett Lawrence
10	August 19	(Maryland) Budds Creek National	Budds Creek MX	Peacock	(Australia) Hunter Lawrence	(Australia) Jett Lawrence
11	August 26	(Indiana) Ironman National	Ironman MX	Peacock	(Japan) Jo Shimoda	(Australia) Jett Lawrence

== 2023 SuperMotocross World Championship ==
2023 SuperMotocross World Championship
- Organizer: American Motorcyclist Association
- Discipline: Supercross and Motocross
- Duration: September 2023
- Number of races: 3
- TV partners: NBC Sports (NBC, USA Network, CNBC, Peacock)

Seasons
- ← 2022 2024 →

The 2023 SuperMotocross World Championship was the inaugural season of the premier worldwide off-road motorcycle racing series, to be held in the United States. Combining the results of the 17 AMA Supercross Championship rounds and 11 AMA Motocross Championship events, the series comprised 31 rounds in total, with three dedicated SuperMotocross rounds that determined the overall champion of AMA off-road motorcycle racing for the season.

2023 SuperMotocross World Championship
Round	Date	Location	Stadium	Live Broadcast	250cc Winner	450cc Winner
1	September 9	(North Carolina) Concord	Charlotte Motor Speedway	Peacock, USA	(Japan) Jo Shimoda	(United States) Chase Sexton
2	September 16	(Illinois) Joliet	Chicagoland Speedway	Peacock	(Australia) Hunter Lawrence	(Australia) Jett Lawrence
3	September 23	(California) Los Angeles	Los Angeles Memorial Coliseum	Peacock, USA	(United States) Haiden Deegan	(Australia) Jett Lawrence

== Television Coverage ==
Network	Coverage
NBC	Select races, including two Supercross races live and two on delay, two Motocross races live and the second SuperMotocross Playoff on delay
USA Network	Supercross season opener and finale live, two Motocross races on delay and SuperMotocross Playoff 1 and Finale live
Peacock	Every race across all series live
CNBC	Every race across all series on next day replay

== See also ==
- AMA Supercross Championship
- AMA Motocross Championship
- 2023 FIM Supercross World Championship
- 2023 FIM Motocross World Championship
