= Julien Beaumer =

American motocross racer

- Nationality: American
- Born: 12 May 2006 (age 20) Lake Havasu City, Arizona

Motocross career
- Years active: 2023-Present
- Teams: •Red Bull KTM Factory Racing Team (2023-Present)
- Wins: •AMA 250cc Supercross: 1; •AMA 250cc Motocross: 2

Julien Beaumer (born May 12, 2006) is an American professional Motocross and Supercross racer. Beaumer has competed in the AMA Supercross and AMA Motocross Championships since 2023.

Beaumer took his first professional win during the 2025 AMA Supercross Championship, when he won the 250SX West class at the San Diego round.

He took his first overall outdoor win at the seventh round of the 2026 AMA National Motocross Championship and ended the season in second in the final standings.

Beaumer represented his country at the 2026 Motocross des Nations, stepping in for an injured Chance Hymas.

Since turning professional, Beaumer has ridden for the Red Bull KTM Factory Racing team.

== Early life ==
Due to Beaumer's father working as a jet ski mechanic, Beaumer began competing in jet ski racing at an early age alongside competing in motocross.

== Career ==
=== Amateur career ===
Beaumer progressed through the amateur ranks in America, showing his talent whilst still on a 50cc motorcycle, when he won the KTM Junior exhibition race at the 2014 Las Vegas supercross. He took his only title at the AMA Amateur National Motocross Championship in 2021, when he won the 450 B Limited class. In the following season, Beaumer was able to win the Schoolboy 2 (12-17) B/C class at the Mini O's event in Florida.

Beaumer started the 2023 season competing in the 250SX Futures class that supported several rounds of the 2023 AMA Supercross Championship. Riding for the EBR Racing Yamaha team, Beaumer qualified on pole at the opening round and impressed enough to be signed by the KTM Orange Brigade team for the remaining rounds. The move to KTM's official amateur programme saw Beaumer pick up back-to-back 250SX Futures wins at the Glendale, Arizona and East Rutherford rounds.

=== 250 career ===
Towards the end of the 2023 season, Beaumer was given the opportunity to make his professional debut in the final two rounds of the 2023 AMA National Motocross Championship as part of the Red Bull KTM Factory Racing team. At the first of these rounds, Beaumer finished ninth overall to complete his professional debut inside the top-ten. As he had signed a multi-year deal with the factory KTM team, Beaumer made his professional supercross debut in the 250SX West class of the 2024 AMA Supercross Championship, finishing sixth on his debut and finishing seventh in the final standings. Beaumer was consistent in the following 2024 AMA National Motocross Championship, finishing eleventh in the final standings with two sixth overall finishes as his best results. At the first round of the season-ending finals of the 2024 SuperMotocross World Championship, Beaumer scored his first professional podium by finishing second.

Beaumer's 2025 AMA Supercross Championship season started with his first professional supercross podium at the opening round, where he finished second to Jo Shimoda. He followed this up by taking his first professional supercross win at the second round in San Diego and by doing so became the championship leader in the 250SX West class. He held the championship lead for two more rounds, before losing it to eventual champion Haiden Deegan. After a season-long battle with Deegan and Cole Davies, Beaumer finished runner-up in the final standings. He began the 2025 AMA National Motocross Championship strongly, recording his best two overall finishes to date in the opening two rounds, with fourth and fifth overall. Lingering issues from a crash at the fourth round impacted his results mid-season and also caused him to miss the seventh and eighth rounds of the championship On his return he was able to score another fifth overall at the penultimate round but would pick up a concussion after a heavy crash at the final round. Beaumer was able to return for the season-ending SuperMotocross World Championship playoff rounds but had another big crash in qualifying at the opening event. This crash resulted in three fractured vertebrae and a lengthy recovery period.

After a long recovery period, which saw Beaumer miss the entire 2026 AMA Supercross Championship, he returned for the outdoor season. Despite the long time on the side lines, Beaumer was on the pace from the off in the 2026 AMA National Motocross Championship, finishing second in the second race at the opening round. Come the second round he was on the podium with second overall, a result he repeated at the fourth round. At the seventh round at Spring Creek, Beaumer would take his first outdoor race and overall win. A further overall win at the final round and his overall consistency saw him finish second in the standings behind Cole Davies. In the SuperMotocross playoff rounds, Beaumer won the second of the three rounds and ended the series in fourth. After an injury to Chance Hymas, Beaumer was selected to compete at the 2026 Motocross des Nations, riding on a 450cc motorcycle for the first time. With little preparation on the bigger capacity bike, his tenth in the first main race on the Sunday was his highlight, with the team ending the event in fifth.

== Honours ==
AMA Supercross Championship

- 250SX West: 2025 (silver)

AMA Motocross Championship

- 250: 2026 (silver)

AMA Amateur National Motocross Championship

- 450B Limited: 2021 (gold)

== AMA Supercross/Motocross results ==
Year	Rnd 1	Rnd 2	Rnd 3	Rnd 4	Rnd 5	Rnd 6	Rnd 7	Rnd 8	Rnd 9	Rnd 10	Rnd 11	Rnd 12	Rnd 13	Rnd 14	Rnd 15	Rnd 16	Rnd 17	Average Finish	Podium Percent	Place
2023 250 MX	-	-	-	-	-	-	-	-	-	9	21	-	-	-	-	-	-	15.00	-	28th
2024 250 SX-W	6	11	16	7	-	7	-	-	-	-	7	7	-	9	-	10	22	10.20	-	7th
2024 250 MX	11	9	9	6	24	OUT	10	10	9	6	14	-	-	-	-	-	-	10.80	-	11th
~2025 250 SX-W	2	1	2	4	-	-	6	-	8	-	4	-	12	-	-	2	2	4.30	50%	2nd
2025 250 MX	5	4	17	20	21	16	OUT	OUT	14	5	19	-	-	-	-	-	-	13.44	-	15th
2026 250 MX	5 FOX (California)	2 HAN (California)	6 THU (Colorado)	2 HIG (Pennsylvania)	18 RED (Michigan)	5 SOU (Massachusetts)	1 SPR (Minnesota)	6 WAS (Washington (state))	10 UNA (New York (state))	4 BUD (Maryland)	1 IRN (Indiana)	-	-	-	-	-	-	5.45	36%	2nd

Notes:

- 1) Beaumer raced a partial Motocross schedule in 2023

== SMX Results ==
Year	Rnd 1	Rnd 2	Rnd 3	Average Finish	Podium Percent	Place
2024 250 SMX	2 CON (North Carolina)	5 FOR (Texas)	9 LVE (Nevada)	5.33	33%	7th
2025 250 SMX	OUT CON (North Carolina)	OUT STL (Missouri)	OUT LVE (Nevada)	-	-	-
2026 250 SMX	18 COL (Ohio)	1 LOS (California)	6 RID (Missouri)	8.33	33%	4th
