= 2022 AMA National Motocross Championship =

Sports championship

The 2022 AMA Motocross Championship season is the 51st AMA Motocross National Championship season, the premier motocross series in USA. Dylan Ferrandis goes into the season as the defending champion in the 450 class, after taking his first 450 national title in 2021. Jett Lawrence is also set to defend his 250 title after taking his first title in 2021.

== Calendar and Results ==
=== 450cc ===
Round	Date	Location	Race 1 Winner	Race 2 Winner	Round Winner
1	May 28	(California) Fox Raceway at Pala I	(United States) Chase Sexton	(United States) Chase Sexton	(United States) Chase Sexton
2	June 4	(California) Hangtown Motocross Classic	(United States) Jason Anderson	(United States) Eli Tomac	(United States) Jason Anderson
3	June 11	(Colorado) Thunder Valley National	(United States) Eli Tomac	(Germany) Ken Roczen	(Germany) Ken Roczen
4	June 18	(Pennsylvania) High Point National	(United States) Chase Sexton	(United States) Eli Tomac	(United States) Eli Tomac
5	July 2	(Michigan) Red Bud National	(United States) Eli Tomac	(United States) Eli Tomac	(United States) Eli Tomac
6	July 9	(Massachusetts) Southwick National	(United States) Eli Tomac	(United States) Eli Tomac	(United States) Eli Tomac
7	July 16	(Minnesota) Spring Creek National	(United States) Eli Tomac	(United States) Eli Tomac	(United States) Eli Tomac
8	July 23	(Washington (state)) Washougal National	(United States) Eli Tomac	(United States) Chase Sexton	(United States) Chase Sexton
9	August 13	(New York (state)) Unadilla National	(United States) Chase Sexton	(United States) Chase Sexton	(United States) Chase Sexton
10	August 20	(Maryland) Budds Creek National	(United States) Eli Tomac	(United States) Chase Sexton	(United States) Jason Anderson
11	August 27	(Indiana) Ironman National	(United States) Eli Tomac	(United States) Chase Sexton	(United States) Chase Sexton
12	September 3	(California) Fox Raceway at Pala II	(United States) Eli Tomac	(United States) Eli Tomac	(United States) Eli Tomac

=== 250cc ===
Round	Date	Location	Race 1 Winner	Race 2 Winner	Round Winner
1	May 28	(California) Fox Raceway at Pala I	(Australia) Jett Lawrence	(Australia) Jett Lawrence	(Australia) Jett Lawrence
2	June 4	(California) Hangtown Motocross Classic	(United States) Michael Mosiman	(Australia) Jett Lawrence	(Australia) Jett Lawrence
3	June 11	(Colorado) Thunder Valley National	(United States) Levi Kitchen	(Australia) Hunter Lawrence	(Australia) Jett Lawrence
4	June 18	(Pennsylvania) High Point National	(Australia) Hunter Lawrence	(Australia) Jett Lawrence	(Australia) Jett Lawrence
5	July 2	(Michigan) Red Bud National	(Japan) Jo Shimoda	(Australia) Jett Lawrence	(Japan) Jo Shimoda
6	July 9	(Massachusetts) Southwick National	(Australia) Jett Lawrence	(Australia) Jett Lawrence	(Australia) Jett Lawrence
7	July 16	(Minnesota) Spring Creek National	(Australia) Jett Lawrence	(Australia) Jett Lawrence	(Australia) Jett Lawrence
8	July 23	(Washington (state)) Washougal National	(Australia) Hunter Lawrence	(United States) Justin Cooper	(Australia) Jett Lawrence
9	August 13	(New York (state)) Unadilla National	(Japan) Jo Shimoda	(United States) Justin Cooper	(Japan) Jo Shimoda
10	August 20	(Maryland) Budds Creek National	(United States) RJ Hampshire	(Japan) Jo Shimoda	(United States) RJ Hampshire
11	August 27	(Indiana) Ironman National	(Australia) Jett Lawrence	(Japan) Jo Shimoda	(Australia) Jett Lawrence
12	September 3	(California) Fox Raceway at Pala II	(Australia) Jett Lawrence	(Japan) Jo Shimoda	(Australia) Jett Lawrence

== Top 5- Championship standings 450cc ==
=== Riders Championship ===
Pos	No	Rider	Bike	FOX I (California)		HAN (California)		THU (Colorado)		HIG (Pennsylvania)		RED (Michigan)		SOU (Massachusetts)		SPR (Minnesota)		WAS (Washington (state))		UNA (New York (state))		BUD (Maryland)		IRN (Indiana)		FOX II (California)		Points
1	3	(United States) Eli Tomac	Yamaha	7	4	4	1	1	3	2	1	1	1	1	1	1	1	1	2	2	2	1	5	1	2	1	1	546
2	23	(United States) Chase Sexton	Honda	1	1	2	2	4	2	1	2	2	2	2	2	2	2	2	1	1	1	7	1	2	1	2	2	539
3	21	(United States) Jason Anderson	Kawasaki	4	8	3	1	3	6	3	5	7	4	8	6	3	4	3	3	3	3	2	2	6	4	4	3	440
4	94	(Germany) Ken Roczen	Honda	2	2	3	4	2	1	7	3	4	7	6	4	16	12	4	6	5	7	3	3	7	6	8	13	394
5	28	(United States) Christian Craig	Yamaha	3	3	5	5	10	12	8	6	5	6	3	8	5	3	6	5	11	9	5	7	5	5	3	4	373
