= Chance Hymas =

American motocross racer

- Nationality: American
- Born: 25 May 2005 (age 21) Pocatello, Idaho

Motocross career
- Years active: 2022-Present
- Teams: •Team Honda HRC (2022-Present)
- Wins: •AMA 250cc Motocross: 3; •AMA 250cc Supercross: 1

Chance Hymas (born May 25, 2005) is an American professional Motocross and Supercross racer. Hymas has competed in the AMA Supercross and AMA Motocross Championships since 2022.

Since turning professional Hymas has competed for the factory Team Honda HRC squad. He took his first professional overall win at the sixth round of the 2024 AMA National Motocross Championship.

Hymas was originally selected to represent his country at the 2024 and 2026 editions of the Motocross des Nations but on both occasions had to withdraw due injuries picked up in the SuperMotocross World Championship finals.

Known for being a versatile rider, Hymas has competed and won in American off-road racing as well as motocross.

== Career ==
=== Amateur career ===
After growing up around the sport due to his father being the owner of a motorcycle dealership, Hymas quickly established himself as one of the best prospects within the American amateur ranks. After podium finishes at the AMA Amateur National Motocross Championship aboard KTM's in 2015 and 2016, Hymas was signed up to compete for the Kawasaki Team Green squad. This resulted in two second overall finishes in 2017 and 2018 whilst riding an 85cc machine and a third place in the Supermini class of the Monster Energy Cup supercross. In 2020, Hymas picked up the Schoolboy 2 title and the following year had two second-place finishes as he moved up to the Pro Sport classes.

Following these performances, Hymas was signed by Team HRC Honda to join their factory team for the 2022 amateur supercross and motocross seasons. In what would be his final amateur season, Hymas experienced success in the 250SX Futures events, taking three wins including the final in Salt Lake City. This would make him the inaugural champion of the supercross futures class at just 16 years of age. At the end of the summer, he made his professional debut at the final round of the 2022 AMA National Motocross Championship.

=== Professional career ===
After finishing fifteenth overall in the 250 class at the final round of the 2022 AMA National Motocross Championship, Hymas competed in the first four rounds of the 250SX East class of the 2023 AMA Supercross Championship. All four outings showed Hymas' potential, as he finished in the top-ten each time, concluding with a sixth at the fourth round. The 2023 AMA National Motocross Championship was scheduled to be his first full-time campaign in the 250 class, however a torn Anterior cruciate ligament after the fourth round ended his season. Prior to his injury he had again had several noticeable results including a third place in the second race at the third round.

Hymas started the 2024 season by finishing eighth in the 250SX East class of the 2024 AMA Supercross Championship, with a fifth at the penultimate round being his best result. He started the 2024 AMA National Motocross Championship strongly in the 250 class with a third place in the opening race. His good form continued with a second place in the first race at round two, before taking his first professional race win and overall podium at the third round. After another podium at the fourth round, Hymas would take his second race win and his first overall victory at the sixth round. With another podium coming at the final round of the series, Hymas finished fourth in the standings of the 250 class and was selected to represent his country in the 2024 Motocross des Nations. However, after picking up a knee injury at the first round of the 2024 SuperMotocross World Championship finals, Hymas had to withdraw from the team.

Hymas came into the 2025 AMA Supercross Championship after recovering from the knee injury over winter and competed in the 250SX East class. During the season, he was able to pick up his first professional supercross win in muddy conditions in Foxborough. With no further podiums to his name, he would finish the championship in sixth. After showing speed in the first two rounds, Hymas put on a dominant display at the third round of the 2025 AMA National Motocross Championship, winning both races and defeating eventual champion Haiden Deegan. After finishing fourth overall at the following round, it was announced Hymas had torn his right Anterior cruciate ligament in the second race, with the need for surgery meaning his 2025 season was over. Hymas returned for the 250SX West class of the 2026 AMA Supercross Championship, where he finished second at the opening round. At the third round he was caught up in a first-turn pileup, resulting in a dislocated shoulder and torn labrum, ending his supercross season. Hymas recovered in time for the 2026 AMA National Motocross Championship but did not really hit his stride until the second half of the campaign. Getting his first race win and overall podium at the seventh round, he then podiumed at all remaining rounds, including an overall win at the penultimate round. After finishing fourth in the standings, Hymas was initially announced to be part of the American team at the 2026 Motocross des Nations. However, just as in 2024, an injury during the 2026 SuperMotocross World Championship playoff rounds, caused him to miss the event.

== Honours ==
AMA Supercross Championship

- 250SX Futures: 2022 (gold)

Monster Energy Cup

- Supermini: 2018 (bronze)

AMA Amateur National Motocross Championship

- Open Pro Sport: 2021 (silver)
- 250 Pro Sport: 2021 (silver)
- 250B: 2020 (bronze)
- Schoolboy 2 (12–17) B/C: 2020 (gold)
- 85cc (9–12): 2018 (silver)
- 85cc (9–11) Limited: 2017 (silver)
- 85cc (9–12): 2016 (bronze)
- 65cc (7–9) Limited: 2015 (silver)

== AMA Supercross/Motocross results ==
Year	Rnd 1	Rnd 2	Rnd 3	Rnd 4	Rnd 5	Rnd 6	Rnd 7	Rnd 8	Rnd 9	Rnd 10	Rnd 11	Rnd 12	Rnd 13	Rnd 14	Rnd 15	Rnd 16	Rnd 17	Average Finish	Podium Percent	Place
2024 250 SX-E	-	-	-	-	10	-	7	15	10	8	-	-	12	8	5	-	7	9.11	-	7th
2024 250 MX	4	4	2	3	4	1	15	9	DNF	4	2	-	-	-	-	-	-	4.80	40%	4th
2025 250 SX-E	-	-	-	-	6	6	-	4	DNF	7	-	1	10	DNF	6	-	11	6.38	13%	6th
2025 250 MX	4	19	1	4	OUT	OUT	OUT	OUT	OUT	OUT	OUT	-	-	-	-	-	-	7.00	25%	19th
‘2026 250 SX-W	2 ANA (California)	6 SDI (California)	DNF ANA (California)	OUT HOU (Texas)	OUT GLE (Arizona)	OUT SEA (Washington (state))	-	-	-	OUT BIR (Alabama)	-	OUT STL (Missouri)	-	-	-	OUT DEN (Colorado)	OUT SLC (Utah)	4.00	33%	17th
2026 250 MX	8 FOX (California)	8 HAN (California)	18 THU (Colorado)	9 HIG (Pennsylvania)	7 RED (Michigan)	6 SOU (Massachusetts)	2 SPR (Minnesota)	3 WAS (Washington (state))	3 UNA (New York (state))	1 BUD (Maryland)	2 IRN (Indiana)	-	-	-	-	-	-	6.09	45%	4th

== SMX Results ==
Year	Rnd 1	Rnd 2	Rnd 3	Average Finish	Podium Percent	Place
2024 250 SMX	16 CON (North Carolina)	OUT FOR (Texas)	OUT LVE (Nevada)	16.00	-	20th
2025 250 SMX	OUT CON (North Carolina)	OUT STL (Missouri)	OUT LVE (Nevada)	-	-	-
2026 250 SMX	7 COL (Ohio)	13 LOS (California)	RID (Missouri)			
