= Malcolm Stewart =

Malcolm Stewart or Stuart may refer to:

- Percy Malcolm Stewart (1872–1951), English industrialist and philanthropist
- Malcolm Stewart (actor) (born 1948), Canadian actor
- Malcolm Stewart (motorcyclist) (born 1992), American motocross racer
- Malcolm Stewart, current deputy United States Solicitor General
- Max Stewart (Malcolm Clarke Stewart, 1935–1977), Australian racing driver
