= Haiden Deegan =

American motorcycle racer

- Nationality: American
- Born: January 10, 2006 (age 20) Temecula, California, US

Motocross career
- Years active: 2022–present
- Teams: •Monster Energy Yamaha Star Racing (2021–present)
- Championships: •2023 SMX 250cc; •2024 AMA Motocross 250cc; •2024 SMX 250cc; •2025 AMA Supercross 250cc West; •2025 AMA Motocross 250cc; •2026 AMA Supercross 250cc West
- Wins: •AMA 250cc Motocross: 14; •AMA 250cc Supercross: 14; •AMA Total: 28

Haiden Deegan (born January 10, 2006) is an American professional motorcycle racer, competing in the AMA Supercross and Motocross championships. He is a two-time 250cc SMX Champion, a two-time AMA Motocross 250cc Champion, and a two-time AMA Supercross 250cc West Champion.

== Career ==
=== Amateur career ===
Deegan competed in several national-level amateur motocross events in the United States. He won seven titles at the AMA Amateur National Motocross Championship at Loretta Lynn's Ranch in various youth classes. He was also part of various youth rider development programs and manufacturer-supported teams during his amateur career.

Deegan spent most of his amateur career on KTM. During his tenure with KTM, Deegan landed a backflip at 10 years old on a 65cc.

In 2021, Deegan signed with the Monster Energy Star Yamaha Racing team.

=== Professional career ===
2022–Present, Monster Energy Star Racing Yamaha

Deegan made his professional debut in the 250SX class of the 2023 AMA Supercross Championship. In his series debut, Deegan placed fourth during round four at NRG Stadium in Houston. He would continue to qualify for multiple main events and achieved three podium finishes, resulting in a 2nd place finish in the final point standings, earning him the 2023 250SX Rookie of the Year award. Transitioning to the AMA Pro Motocross Championship, Deegan continued to impress in the 250 class. He achieved his first overall victory at the RedBud National and added another win at Washougal. Throughout the season, he consistently finished within the top-ten, culminating in a fourth-place finish in the overall standings with 371 points.

In 2024, Deegan continued with the Yamaha Star Racing team for his second full professional season. He entered the 250SX East Region of the AMA Supercross Championship and claimed his first win of the series at round seven in Arlington, Texas. He would go on to win rounds 13 and 17, with an overall 2nd place finish in the series behind Tom Vialle. In the 250 class of the 2024 AMA Pro Motocross Championship, Deegan clinched the overall series title with five 1st place finishes. Following the motocross series, Deegan was slated to represent Team USA alongside Chase Sexton and Aaron Plessinger at the 2024 Motocross of Nations, but elected to focus on healing from a wrist injury.

In 2025, Deegan switched from racing 250SX East Region to the 250SX West Region series; in the 16th round at Empower Field in Denver, Colorado, Deegan clinched the series title.

==== SuperMotocross ====
Deegan has participated in post-season events such as the SuperMotocross World Championship, which combines elements of both supercross and motocross formats. Deegan has clinched back-to-back 250 SMX championships in 2023 and 2024.

== AMA Supercross/Motocross results ==
Year	Rnd 1	Rnd 2	Rnd 3	Rnd 4	Rnd 5	Rnd 6	Rnd 7	Rnd 8	Rnd 9	Rnd 10	Rnd 11	Rnd 12	Rnd 13	Rnd 14	Rnd 15	Rnd 16	Rnd 17	Average Finish	Podium Percent	Place
2022 250 MX	-	-	-	-	-	-	-	-	-	-	31 IRN (Indiana)	13 FOX (California)	-	-	-	-	-	22.00	-	34th
2023 250 SX-E	-	-	-	-	4 HOU (Texas)	4 TAM (Florida)	8 ARL (Texas)	3 DAY (Florida)	7 IND (Indiana)	3 DET (Michigan)	-	-	3 HAM (Georgia (country))	6 EAR (New Jersey)	4 NAS (Tennessee)	-	8 SLC (Utah)	5.00	30%	2nd
2023 250 MX	2 FOX (California)	3 HAN (California)	8 THU (Colorado)	3 HIG (Pennsylvania)	1 RED (Michigan)	6 SOU (Massachusetts)	7 SPR (Minnesota)	1 WAS (Washington (state))	17 UNA (New York (state))	11 BUD (Maryland)	2 IRN (Indiana)	-	-	-	-	-	-	5.45	55%	4th
2024 250 SX-E	-	-	-	-	16 DET (Michigan)	-	1 ARL (Texas)	4 DAY (Florida)	9 BIR (Alabama)	3 IND (Indiana)	-	-	1 FOX (Massachusetts)	6 NAS (Tennessee)	3 PHI (Pennsylvania)	-	1 SLC (Utah)	4.89	56%	2nd
2024 250 MX	1 FOX (California)	1 HAN (California)	1 THU (Colorado)	2 HIG (Pennsylvania)	1 SOU (Massachusetts)	5 RED (Michigan)	2 SPR (Minnesota)	1 WAS (Washington (state))	2 UNA (New York (state))	3 BUD (Maryland)	4 IRN (Indiana)	-	-	-	-	-	-	2.09	82%	1st
‘2025 250 SX-W	5 ANA (California)	3 SDI (California)	1 ANA (California)	2 GLE (Arizona)	-	-	1 ARL (Texas)	-	3 IND (Indiana)	-	3 SEA (Washington (state))	-	2 PHI (Pennsylvania)	-	-	1 DEN (Colorado)	1 SLC (Utah)	2.20	90%	1st
2025 250 MX	1 FOX (California)	1 HAN (California)	2 THU (Colorado)	1 HIG (Pennsylvania)	1 SOU (Massachusetts)	5 RED (Michigan)	1 SPR (Minnesota)	2 WAS (Washington (state))	1 IRN (Indiana)	2 UNA (New York (state))	1 BUD (Maryland)	-	-	-	-	-	-	1.63	90%	1st
‘2026 250 SX-W	4 ANA (California)	1 SDI (California)	1 ANA (California)	1 HOU (Texas)	1 GLE (Arizona)	1 SEA (Washington (state))	-	-	-	2 BIR (Alabama)	-	1 STL (Missouri)	-	-	-	1 DEN (Colorado)	4 SLC (Utah)	1.70	80%	1st
2026 450 MX	5 FOX (California)	3 HAN (California)	6 THU (Colorado)	3 HIG (Pennsylvania)	6 RED (Michigan)	3 SOU (Massachusetts)	2 SPR (Minnesota)	3 WAS (Washington (state))	3 UNA (New York (state))	3 BUD (Maryland)	9 IRN (Indiana)	-	-	-	-	-	-	4.18	64%	3rd

Notes:

- 1) Deegan raced a partial Motocross schedule in 2022.

== SMX Results ==
Year	Rnd 1	Rnd 2	Rnd 3	Average Finish	Podium Percent	Place
2023 250 SMX	3 CON (North Carolina)	3 CHI (Illinois)	1 LAC (California)	2.33	100%	1st
2024 250 SMX	1 CON (North Carolina)	1 FOR (Texas)	2 LVE (Nevada)	1.33	100%	1st
2025 250 SMX	1 CON (North Carolina)	6 STL (Missouri)	9 LVE (Nevada)	5.33	33%	5th
2026 450 SMX	1 COL (Ohio)	4 LOS (California)	1 RID (Missouri)	2.00	66%	2nd

== Personal life ==
Deegan is the son of professional freestyle motocross rider and racing driver Brian Deegan and younger brother of NASCAR driver Hailie Deegan. His younger brother, Hudson whose nickname is Huckson, races Supermini.

In 2025, Deegan was arrested in Walton County, Florida, on charges related to alleged street racing.
