= Chase Sexton =

American motorcycle racer

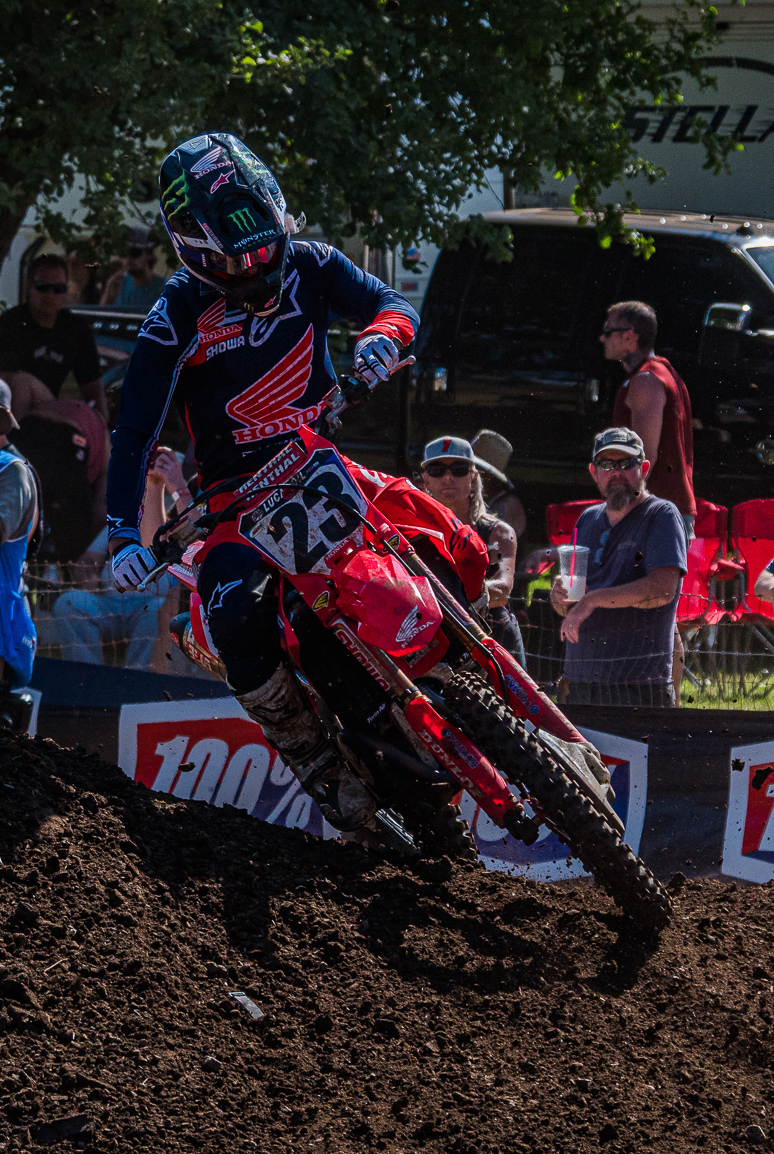
- Sexton in 2021
- Nationality: American
- Born: September 23, 1999 (age 27) Mendota, Illinois, US

Motocross career
- Years active: 2017–present
- Teams: •Geico Honda/HRC (2017–2023); •Red Bull KTM Factory Racing (2023–2025); •Monster Energy Kawasaki (2025-2026)
- Championships: •2019 AMA Supercross 250cc East; •2020 AMA Supercross 250cc East; •2023 AMA Supercross 450cc; •2024 AMA Motocross 450cc
- Wins: •AMA 250cc Supercross: 6; •AMA 450cc Supercross: 18; •AMA 450cc Motocross: 14; •AMA Total: 38

Chase Sexton (born September 23, 1999) is an American professional Supercross and Motocross racer competing in the AMA Supercross and Motocross championships; a 450cc AMA Supercross & 450cc AMA Motocross Champion& a two-time 250cc East AMA Supercross Champion. He was a member of the winning USA team at the 2022 Motocross Des Nations.

Sexton was a well-known rookie, earning the 2016 AMA Nicky Hayden Amateur Horizon Award, and was the 2018 Monster Energy AMA Supercross Rookie of the year.

== Motocross career ==
=== 2019/20 ===
Sexton won back-to-back AMA Supercross 250cc East Championships for Geico Honda in 2019 and 2020.

=== 2021 ===
2021 was Sexton’s full debut season in the 450cc class as he competed in 450cc motocross in 2020.

In supercross, Sexton suffered an injury at round 2 which put him out until the ninth round where he finished eighth. In the final 5 rounds of the season, he managed three podiums, and his highest finish was second place. He placed 12th overall for the season.

In motocross, Sexton won 1 round at Washougal, but missed the last two rounds which placed him fifth in the final standings.

=== 2022 ===
In 2022, Sexton gained his first premier class victory in San Diego in round 3 of the 2022 AMA Supercross Championship. In AMA Motocross, Sexton battled multi-time champion Eli Tomac until the very last round, narrowly missing out on his first premier 450cc class title by seven points.

Sexton was also a member of the USA MXON team alongside Eli Tomac & Justin Cooper in 2022, where they finished first place.

=== 2023 ===
Supercross

For the 2023 Supercross season, Sexton won Honda's first 450cc title since 2003, with 6 wins and 13 podium finishes. Going into round 16, he was 18 points behind points leader Eli Tomac. Sexton ultimately won the event with an eight-point lead.

Motocross

Sexton placed second at the opening AMA Motocross round. He was then sidelined due to illness until round 5 at Red Bud.

SuperMotocross

Sexton won the inaugural 450cc round of SMX with a 1–1 score.

On Monday October 9, it was announced that Sexton would leave Honda HRC, the team he's raced his full professional career with, and join the Red Bull KTM factory racing team on a two-year deal. He also changed his AMA number from 23, to the number 4.

=== 2024 ===
Supercross

Sexton had mixed results across the season, claiming wins at round 2 & 16, as well as multiple podium finishes was enough to place him third in the championship standings.

Motocross

In motocross, Sexton captured his first AMA Motocross Championship. Sexton won seven overall rounds, secured ten podiums, and clinched the championship one moto early.

=== 2025 ===
Sexton entered the 2025 AMA Supercross Championship as one of the primary title contenders following a strong 2024 season. Riding the KTM 450 SX-F, he immediately established himself among the championship leaders, winning the opening round scoring podium finishes, and winning multiple main events during the season. Throughout the 17-round championship Sexton maintained consistent top-five finishes and remained in the title fight with the leading riders in the class. Despite several victories and podium finishes, crashes and inconsistent results in a number of rounds ultimately prevented him from securing the championship. Sexton finished second in the final 450SX championship standings, marking his best Supercross result since his championship-winning season earlier in the decade.

Coming into Motocross as the defending champion, Sexton was poised once again a for a strong season. During the first moto of the 11 round series, Sexton crashed due to complications with his goggles which sidelined him for the next four rounds. Ultimately ending his championship campaign. After his return at round six, Sexton most notably won round 8 at Washougal with a 1-2 score, thus ending Jett Lawrence’s overall win streak. The following round saw sexton sidelined again. After a first place finish in moto 1 at the Ironman National, Sexton worked his way through the field in the second moto before a piece of debris was lodged into the rear brake causing a big crash after the finish line jump.

=== 2026 ===
Once again, Sexton entered the supercross season as a title contender. Having switched manufacturers from KTM to Kawasaki, Sexton citied a newfound motivation to once again win the 450 Supercross Championship. After a frustrating opening couple rounds, Sexton claimed Kawasaki’s first 450 SX win in 1358 days at Anaheim 2, round 3 of the series. The following weeks, Sexton regressed on his new platform, struggling with motorcycle setup and comfort, finishing around 5-7, before a practice crash the week of Daytona Supercross ruled him out for a couple rounds. Sexton returned for the last seven rounds, notably scoring a second place finish at Detroit, and the win at Salt Lake City.

== AMA Supercross/Motocross results ==
Year	Rnd 1	Rnd 2	Rnd 3	Rnd 4	Rnd 5	Rnd 6	Rnd 7	Rnd 8	Rnd 9	Rnd 10	Rnd 11	Rnd 12	Rnd 13	Rnd 14	Rnd 15	Rnd 16	Rnd 17	Average Finish	Podium Percent	Place
~2018 250 SX-W	8	3	8	5	6	3	-	-	-	-	-	DNF	2	-	-	5	6	5.11	33%	5th
2018 250 MX	6	9	7	16	3	8	6	6	9	5	2	3	-	-	-	-	-	6.67	25%	6th
2019 250 SX-E	–	–	–	–	–	5	3	3	4	2	4	2	–	–	2	1	4	3.00	60%	1st
2019 250 MX	5	4	5	3	9	18	OUT	12	5	3	7	4	–	–	–	–	–	6.81	18%	5th
2020 250 SX-E	–	–	–	–	–	–	2	1	1	2	2	4	1	–	–	1	1	1.60	89%	1st
2020 450 MX	8	13	6	2	10	4	5	4	1	–	–	–	–	–	–	–	–	5.88	22%	5th
2021 450 SX	14	DNF	OUT	OUT	OUT	OUT	OUT	OUT	8	4	5	DNF	2	2	10	5	3	5.89	33%	12th
2021 450 MX	5	6	5	6	7	4	1	5	4	5	OUT	OUT	–	–	–	–	–	4.80	10%	5th
2022 450 SX	5	9	1	3	3	7	16	4	3	22	4	OUT	2	3	2	4	2	5.62	50%	6th
2022 450 MX	1	2	3	2	2	2	2	1	1	4	1	2	–	–	–	–	–	1.92	92%	2nd
2023 450 SX	3	3	5	1	2	2	2	3	10	1	5	2	1	4	1	1	1	2.76	76%	1st
2023 450 MX	2	OUT	OUT	OUT	3	2	2	2	2	4	2	–	–	–	–	–	–	2.40	88%	4th
2024 450 SX	3	1	8	5	2	9	6	3	4	3	2	5	2	DNF	2	8	1	4.00	53%	3rd
2024 450 MX	3	1	5	2	2	1	1	1	1	1	1	-	-	-	-	-	-	1.73	91%	1st
2025 450 SX	1	6	4	1	5	3	3	5	3	1	2	6	1	1	2	1	1	2.58	71%	2nd
2025 450 MX	DNF	OUT	OUT	OUT	OUT	5	3	1	10	OUT	OUT	-	-	-	-	-	-	4.75	50%	14th
2026 450 SX	8 ANA (California)	4 SDI (California)	1 ANA (California)	5 HOU (Texas)	7 GLE (Arizona)	5 SEA (Washington (state))	6 ARL (Texas)	OUT	OUT	OUT	2 DET (Michigan)	DNF STL (Missouri)	4 NAS (Tennessee)	4 CLE (Ohio)	7 PHI (Pennsylvania)	5 DEN (Colorado)	1 SLC (Utah)	4.21	21%	6th
2026 450 MX	6 FOX (California)	7 HAN (California)	OUT THU (Colorado)	OUT HIG (Pennsylvania)	OUT RED (Michigan)	OUT SOU (Massachusetts)	OUT SPR (Minnesota)	OUT WAS (Washington (state))	OUT UNA (New York (state))	OUT BUD (Maryland)	OUT IRN (Indiana)	-	-	-	-	-	-	6.50	-	21st

Notes:

- 1) The AMA Motocross Season (MX) is 11 rounds as of 2023, The AMA Supercross Season (SX) is 17 Rounds.

== SMX Results ==
Year	Rnd 1	Rnd 2	Rnd 3	Average Finish	Podium Percent	Place
2023 450 SMX	1 CON (North Carolina)	3 CHI (Illinois)	10 LAC (California)	4.67	66%	3rd
2024 450 SMX	3 CON (North Carolina)	2 FOR (Texas)	DNF LVE (Nevada)	2.50	66%	7th
2025 450 SMX	2 CON (North Carolina)	7 STL (Missouri)	14 LVE (Nevada)	7.67	33%	8th
2026 450 SMX	OUT COL (Ohio)	OUT LOS (California)	OUT RID (Missouri)	-	-	-
