= Millville, Minnesota =

City in Minnesota, United States

Millville
- City
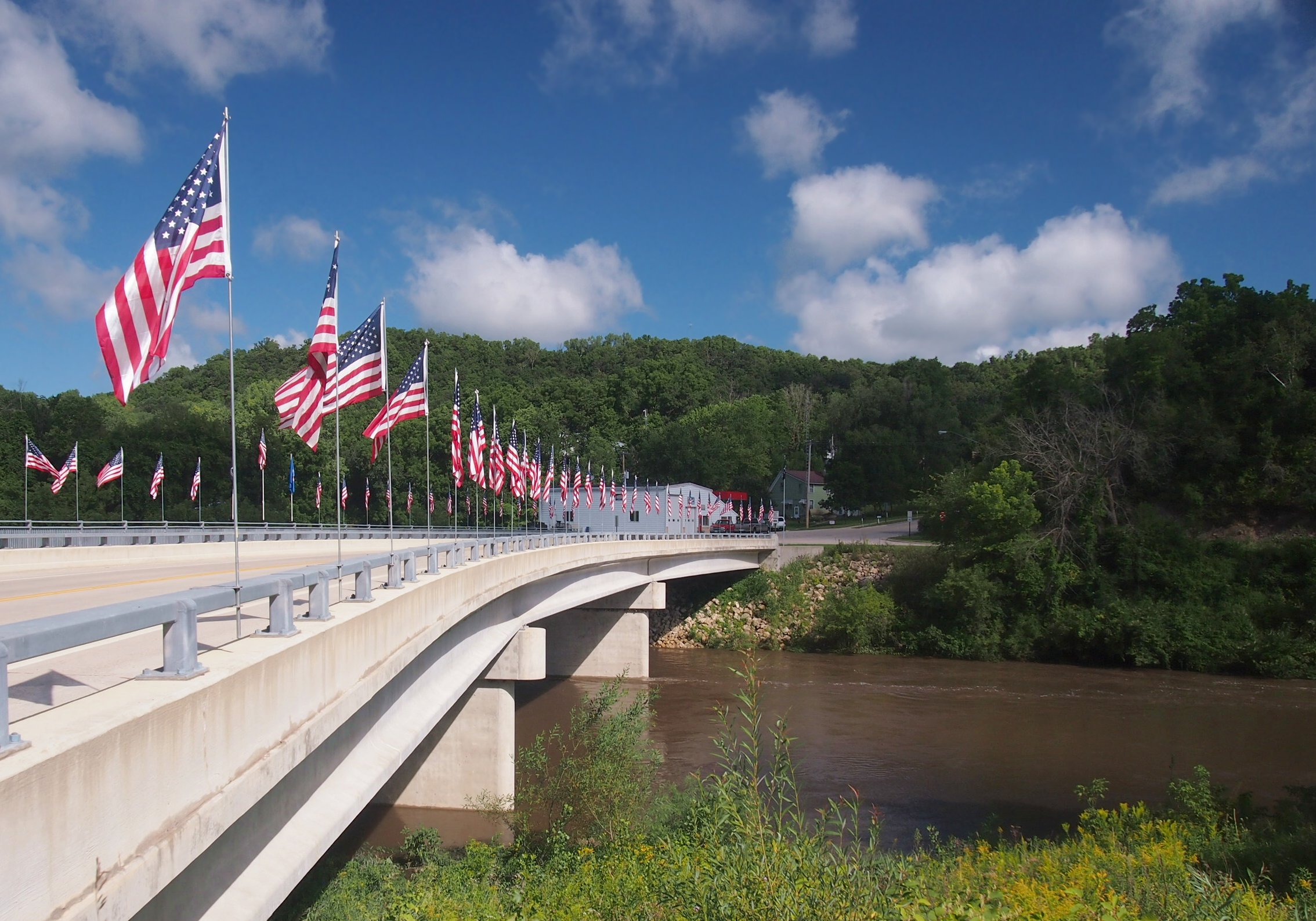
- Bridge over the Zumbro River in Millville

- Location of Millville, Minnesota
- Coordinates: 44°14′42″N 92°17′41″W
- Country: United States
- State: Minnesota
- County: Wabasha

Area
  - Total: 0.15 sq mi (0.40 km^{2})
  - Land: 0.15 sq mi (0.39 km^{2})
  - Water: 0.0039 sq mi (0.01 km^{2})
- Elevation: 830 ft (253 m)

Population (2020)
  - Total: 151
  - Density: 1,008.6/sq mi (389.42/km^{2})
- Time zone: UTC-6 (Central (CST))
  - Summer (DST): UTC-5 (CDT)
- ZIP code: 55957
- Area code: 507
- FIPS code: 27-42290
- GNIS feature ID: 0647891

Millville is a city along the Zumbro River in Wabasha County, Minnesota, United States. As of the 2020 census, Millville had a population of 151.

== History ==
A post office called Millville has been in operation since 1867. The city was located at a point where the Zumbro River makes a relatively rapid descent.

The city contains one property listed on the National Register of Historic Places: the 1874 Swedish Evangelical Lutheran Church.

== Geography ==
According to the United States Census Bureau, the city has a total area of 0.14 square miles (0.36 km^{2}), all of it land.

Wabasha County Roads 2 and 11 are main routes in the community.

== Demographics ==
Historical population
Census	Pop.	Note	%±
1880	143		—
1900	149		—
1910	156		4.7%
1920	194		24.4%
1930	185		−4.6%
1940	175		−5.4%
1950	168		−4.0%
1960	171		1.8%
1970	139		−18.7%
1980	186		33.8%
1990	163		−12.4%
2000	186		14.1%
2010	182		−2.2%
2020	151		−17.0%
U.S. Decennial Census

=== 2010 census ===
As of the census of 2010, there were 182 people, 75 households, and 54 families living in the city. The population density was 1,300.0 inhabitants per square mile (501.9/km^{2}). There were 80 housing units at an average density of 571.4 per square mile (220.6/km^{2}). The racial makeup of the city was 100.0% White. Hispanic or Latino of any race were 2.2% of the population.

There were 75 households, of which 25.3% had children under the age of 18 living with them, 57.3% were married couples living together, 9.3% had a female householder with no husband present, 5.3% had a male householder with no wife present, and 28.0% were non-families. 22.7% of all households were made up of individuals, and 13.3% had someone living alone who was 65 years of age or older. The average household size was 2.43 and the average family size was 2.78.

The median age in the city was 33.5 years. 23.6% of residents were under the age of 18; 12% were between the ages of 18 and 24; 24.7% were from 25 to 44; 23.6% were from 45 to 64; and 15.9% were 65 years of age or older. The gender makeup of the city was 51.1% male and 48.9% female.

=== 2000 census ===
As of the census of 2000, there were 186 people, 76 households, and 46 families living in the city. The population density was 1,279.8 inhabitants per square mile (494.1/km^{2}). There were 78 housing units at an average density of 536.7 per square mile (207.2/km^{2}). The racial makeup of the city was 93.01% White, 2.69% Native American, 4.30% from other races. Hispanic or Latino of any race were 4.84% of the population. There were 76 households, out of which 28.9% had children under the age of 18 living with them, 57.9% were married couples living together, 2.6% had a female householder with no husband present, and 38.2% were non-families. 32.9% of all households were made up of individuals, and 14.5% had someone living alone who was 65 years of age or older. The average household size was 2.45 and the average family size was 3.23.

In the city, the population was spread out, with 25.3% under the age of 18, 12.9% from 18 to 24, 28.5% from 25 to 44, 17.2% from 45 to 64, and 16.1% who were 65 years of age or older. The median age was 35 years. For every 100 females, there were 109.0 males. For every 100 females age 18 and over, there were 95.8 males.

The median income for a household in the city was $38,125, and the median income for a family was $52,750. Males had a median income of $28,571 versus $22,083 for females. The per capita income for the city was $16,491. None of the families and 4.4% of the population were living below the poverty line, including no under eighteens and 15.4% of those over 64.

== Culture ==
Millville is home to the Spring Creek MX Park, since 1983 a regular stop on the AMA Motocross Championship series.
