= Jo Shimoda =

Japanese motorcycle racer

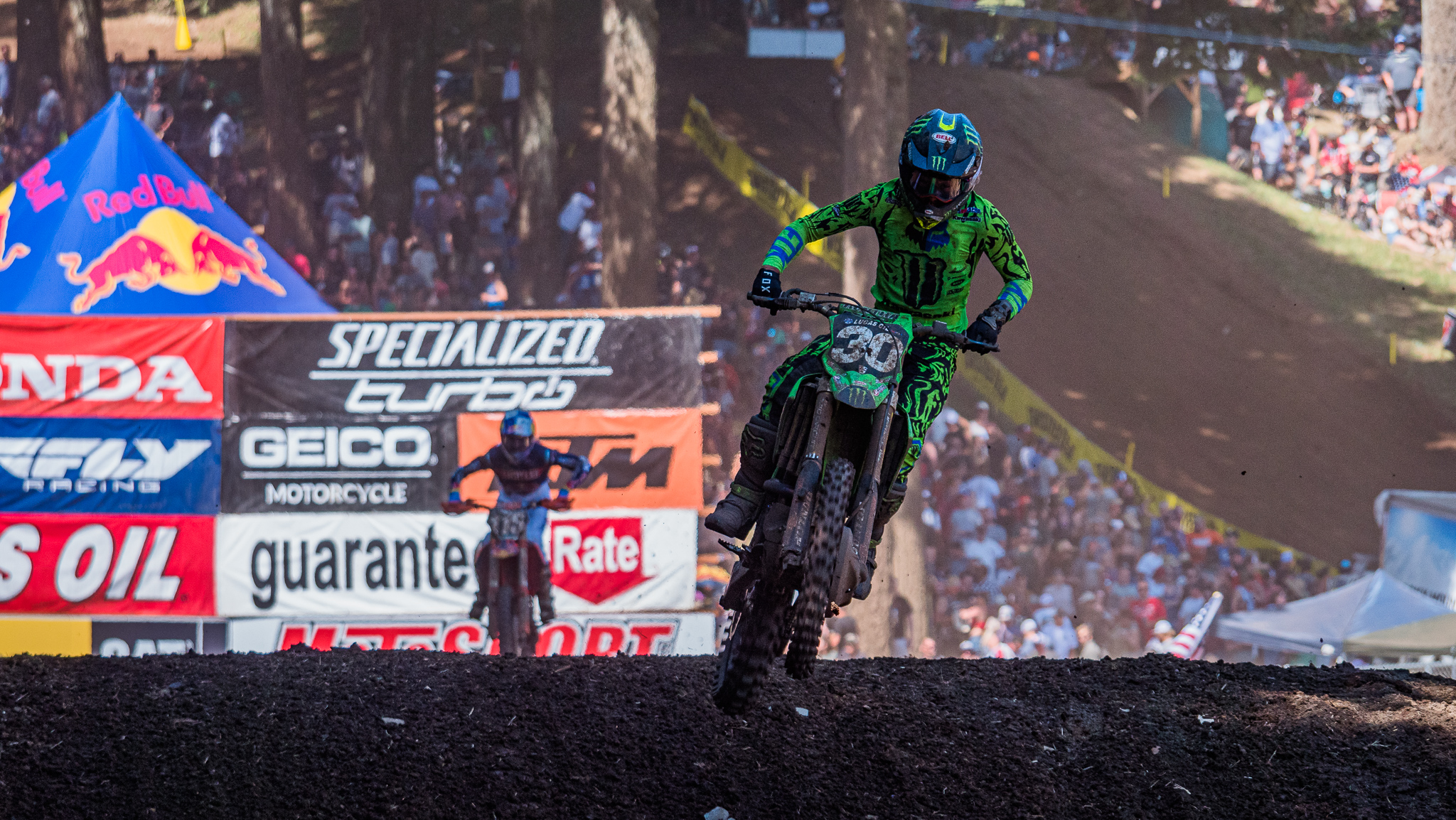
- Shimoda in 2021
- Nationality: (Japan) Japanese
- Born: 16 May 2002 (age 24) Suzuka, Mie, Japan

Motocross career
- Years active: 2019-Present
- Teams: •Monster Energy Pro Circuit Kawasaki (2021-2023); •Honda HRC (2023-Present)
- Championships: •2025 SMX 250cc
- Wins: •250cc AMA Supercross: 3; •250cc AMA Motocross: 7

Jo Shimoda (下田丈, Shimoda Jō; born 16 May 2002) is a Japanese professional motocross rider who currently competes in the AMA Supercross and Motocross championships for HRC Honda. He is the 2025 SMX 250cc Champion.

== Personal life ==
Shimoda was born and raised in Suzuka, Japan to parents Yoichi and Ai. He has one sister. Jo's father rode motorcycles and gave Jo a dirt bike when he was a toddler. Jo continued to ride through childhood and his parents entered him in many local races. His father then sought stiffer competition for Jo and had him race in Europe and the United States. He began racing full time in the US in 2016 and turned pro in 2019. He resides in Clermont, Florida.

== Career ==
=== Amateur career ===
As a child, Shimoda raced in Japan, Europe, and the US. In 2016 he won the AMA Amateur National Championship in Super Mini 2 at Loretta Lynn's. The next year, he signed with the Honda Factory Connection's amateur program. In 2018, he was the Monster Energy All Stars winner. In 2019, he turned pro, racing the last three AMA Pro Motocross Nationals.

=== 2020 ===
Shimoda raced the 250SX East and finished third in the standings after a delay in the season. He was awarded the AMA Supercross Rookie of the Year. In motocross, Shimoda raced to a best finish of fifth and was 11th in the championship. He then signed with Pro Circuit Kawasaki.

=== 2021 ===
Shimoda again raced the 250SX East, placing within the top-five for most of season and earning his first win. He finished second overall. Shimoda had an up and down motocross season with three podium finishes and placed fifth overall.

=== 2022 ===
Shimoda raced the 250SX East this year and placed fourth in the championship with two podiums. He raced well in Motocross and was rarely off the podium. He achieved two overall wins and finished second in the standings. Shimoda was part of team Japan at the MXoN at Redbud. His team struggled in the conditions and they did not qualify for the main event.

=== 2023 ===
During preparation for racing 250SX East, Shimoda suffered a shoulder injury. He was able to return for the last four rounds in where he finished fourth twice, ninth and second. In motocross, Shimoda struggled to find consistency. He ended the season with one win and four podium finishes, which led him to a third place finish in the standings. At the inaugural SuperMotorcross Championship, Shimoda won the opening round then placed second in the next two rounds. He finished second overall.

On Wednesday October 18, Shimoda announced his move from Pro Circuit Kawasaki to HRC Honda.

=== 2024 ===
Shimoda started his 250SX West season with some misfortunes but mostly stayed within the top-five. He had one win and placed fourth in the championship.

== AMA Supercross/Motocross results ==
Year	Rnd 1	Rnd 2	Rnd 3	Rnd 4	Rnd 5	Rnd 6	Rnd 7	Rnd 8	Rnd 9	Rnd 10	Rnd 11	Rnd 12	Rnd 13	Rnd 14	Rnd 15	Rnd 16	Rnd 17	Average Finish	Podium Percent	Place
2020 250 SX-E	-	-	-	-	-	-	10	10	5	7	21	8	11	-	-	5	8	9.44	-	3rd
2020 250 MX	16	25	8	15	10	8	8	7	5	-	-	-	-	-	-	-	-	11.33	-	11th
2021 250 SX-E	4	5	4	3	4	2	4	-	-	-	-	-	-	-	-	1	6	3.67	33%	2nd
2021 250 MX	10	4	11	6	2	7	13	16	6	2	4	2	-	-	-	-	-	6.92	25%	5th
~2022 250 SX-W	7	7	5	7	3	OUT	-	-	-	-	-	4	-	4	-	4	5	5.11	11%	4th
2022 250 MX	3	4	5	3	1	2	2	4	1	2	2	2	-	-	-	-	-	2.58	75%	2nd
2023 250 SX-E	-	-	-	-	OUT	OUT	OUT	OUT	OUT	OUT	-	-	4	9	2	-	4	4.75	25%	13th
2023 250 MX	7	6	4	4	7	3	3	7	4	3	1	-	-	-	-	-	-	4.45	36%	3rd
2024 250 SX-W	4	DNF	4	4	-	3	-	-	-	-	3	2	-	2	-	1	4	2.78	56%	4th
2024 250 MX	6	5	4	4	3	3	13	3	12	OUT	OUT	-	-	-	-	-	-	5.89	33%	6th
2025 250 SX-W	1	7	6	10	-	-	4	-	6	-	5	-	5	-	-	9	8	6.10	10%	4th
2025 250 MX	2	2	6	6	5	1	3	1	2	1	2	-	-	-	-	-	-	2.82	73%	2nd
2026 250 SX-E	-	-	-	-	-	-	2 ARL (Texas)	4 DAY (Florida)	2 IND (Indiana)	4 BIR (Alabama)	3 DET (Michigan)	OUT STL (Missouri)	OUT NAS (Tennessee)	OUT CLE (Ohio)	OUT PHI (Pennsylvania)	-	OUT SLC (Utah)	3.00	60%	8th
2026 250 MX	6 FOX (California)	5 HAN (California)	1 THU (Colorado)	3 HIG (Pennsylvania)	2 RED (Michigan)	OUT SOU (Massachusetts)	OUT SPR (Minnesota)	OUT WAS (Washington (state))	OUT UNA (New York (state))	OUT BUD (Maryland)	OUT IRN (Indiana)	-	-	-	-	-	-	3.40	60%	8th

== SMX Results ==
Year	Rnd 1	Rnd 2	Rnd 3	Average Finish	Podium Percent	Place
2023 250 SMX	1 CON (North Carolina)	2 CHI (Illinois)	2 LAC (California)	1.67	100%	2nd
2024 250 SMX	4 CON (North Carolina)	3 FOR (Texas)	4 LVE (Nevada)	3.67	33%	4th
2025 250 SMX	3 CON (North Carolina)	1 STL (Missouri)	1 LVE (Nevada)	1.67	100%	1st
2026 250 SMX	13 COL (Ohio)	4 LOS (California)	12 RID (Missouri)	9.67	-	9th
