= FIM Supercross World Championship =

Annual supercross racing competition

- Category: Motocross
- Region: International
- Inaugural season: 1992
- Classes: SX1; SX2
- Riders' champion: (United States) Jason Anderson (2025)
- Teams' champion: (Australia) Quadlock Honda
- Official website: website

The FIM Supercross World Championship is the premier championship for international stadium supercross racing. It is organized by the Fédération Internationale de Motocyclisme (FIM), the global governing body of motorcycle racing.

== History ==
The series has its roots in the Rodil Trophy which was elevated to World Championship status in 1987. References to Rodil were removed in 1992 as the series became the FIM World Supercross Championship. From 2002 to 2006 in partnership with American-owned promoters Clear Channel Entertainment the series was staged in countries such as Switzerland, the Netherlands, Spain and Canada as well as the United States (which had its own prestigious national championship) as the World Supercross GP. In 2008 the series merged with the AMA Supercross Championship to form the Monster Energy AMA Supercross, an FIM World Championship.

In 2022, amid disruptions cased by the COVID-19 pandemic, the FIM World Supercross Championship split from the AMA and was re-booted by Australian promoters SX Global, to manage and promote the championship over the coming decade.

The advent of a separate world championship for Supercross, as well as wildcard appearances in 2022 by star AMA riders, led many industry observers to believe that the new World Supercross Championship would be detrimental to traditional outdoor motocross, particularly AMA Pro Motocross. Supercross races have carried larger purses than either the AMA Nationals or MXGP. The new FIM World Supercross Championship promised even larger purses plus a spring and summer season that coincided with AMA Pro Motocross and MXGP. The arrival of top AMA Supercross Ken Roczen to the World Supercross Championship led Feld Entertainment and the AMA to combine their off-road racing series to form the SuperMotocross World Championship as well as up the prize money for race winners and champions to keep the top AMA riders stateside. MXGP followed suit to prevent its riders from seeking greater purses in WorldSX.

In 2023, the series lost its primary backing and underwent an ownership change.

== Calendar ==
The 2022 FIM World Supercross Championship began in October for the pilot season that consisted of 2 rounds. Round 1 of FIM World Supercross Championship was the British Grand Prix on October 8 to be held at Principality Stadium, Cardiff, Wales. Round 2 of the Championship was the Australian Grand Prix which is two day event scheduled on Friday 21st and Saturday 22 October 2022 held at Marvel Stadium, Melbourne.

The series will start again in July 2023 and continue through until November, consisting of 6 rounds in both the WSX (450cc) class and the SX2 (250cc) class, to be held in football and baseball stadiums across the world. Beginning with Round 1 in July 2023, the series will take place in different locations globally before concluding in Melbourne for the final round of the Championship in November.

2023 Championship Calendar

Round 1: British GP - Villa Park in Birmingham on July 1

Round 2: French GP - Groupama Stadium in Décines-Charpieu, Lyon on July 22

Round 3: Asian GP - Location TBC on September 30

Round 4: German GP - Merkur Spiel-Arena, Düsseldorf on October 14

Round 5: Canadian GP - BC Place in Vancouver on October 28

Round 6: Australian GP - Marvel Stadium, Melbourne on November 24 and 25

== Event Format ==
The non-traditional format features more races and shorter race durations, significantly increasing the overall level of action and excitement, while minimising downtime for fans throughout events. Highlighting the competitive format are three Main Event races for each class, with the combined individual results of each Main Event determining each Championship Round winner for both the WSX and SX2 classes. The three, back-to-back Main Event format and shorter race durations significantly increases the overall level of intensity and unpredictability at every Championship round and makes getting effective starts and hole shots all the more critical. Much of this format has been tested successfully at SX Global-produced AUS-X Open events, with incredibly positive feedback from riders and fans alike.”

In addition, the WSX class will feature a SuperPole round – an individual time trial format, featuring the top 10 WSX heat race finishers, to determine the order for the Main Event races. Combined with adjacent entertainment, including live music and freestyle motocross exhibitions, the unique format translates into an unparalleled level of entertainment for fans at every WSX Championship round soon.

=== Race Schedule ===
The competitive format at WSX Championship rounds breaks down as follows:

==== Qualifying Session ====
WSX and SX2 fields will each be split into two separate timed qualifying sessions, with individual lap times determining the order for each class’ heat races. Each qualifying session will last 10 minutes, with final laps run to completion once the 10-minute session expires.

==== Heat Races ====
WSX class heat races will determine the order for the SuperPole – a time-trial format exclusive to the WSX class that will determine the order of its Main Event round. The top five finishers in each of the two WSX heat races will earn a spot in the 6 -rider SuperPole. The sixth to 11th-place finishers in each heat will fill spots 11–22 in the gate pick order for the main event, with the faster overall heat taking precedent and gate picks alternating between the remaining riders.

For the SX2 class, in the same manner as with traditional supercross formats, heat races will determine the order for the main event. Collectively, the faster overall heat will take precedent, with gate pick choice for the Main Event alternating between the finishing order of the two SX2 heats.

==== SuperPole ====
Exclusive to the WSX class, the SuperPole round will feature 6 riders – the top-five finishers from the two WSX heat races. Featuring an individual time-trial format, lap times from the SuperPole round will determine the gate pick order of the top 6 for the WSX Main Event races.

==== Main Events ====
Each WSX Championship round will see riders contest three ‘back-to-back’ Main Event races for each class, with only a short 5-minute break between each. The combined individual results determining the winner and podium spots for each Championship Round.

==== Championship Points ====
FIM World Supercross Championship points will be awarded for each of the three Main Event races. Points will follow the traditional supercross format of 25, 22 and 20, 18 and 16 points respectively for first through fifth place, with the remaining 17 riders earning from 15 points to 1 point, depending on where they finish. It total, a maximum of 75 FIM World Championship Points are up for grabs at each WSX Championship round.

In addition to the Main Event races, the fastest SX2 qualifier and the winner of the WSX Superpole will be awarded one additional Championship point.

==== Practice Sessions ====
As with traditional supercross event formats, practice sessions will take place during afternoons for the enjoyment of fans who arrive earlier and want to enjoy as much action as possible.

== World champions ==
| Year | Winner | Runner-Up | Third |
| 2026 | Series cancelled after one round | | |
| 2025 | (United States) Jason Anderson 171 | (United States) Joey Savatgy 166 | (United States) Christian Craig 154 |
| 2024 | (United States) Eli Tomac 397 | (Germany) Ken Roczen 354 | (United States) Joey Savatgy 328 |
| 2023 | (Germany) Ken Roczen 193 | (United States) Joey Savatgy 176 | (United Kingdom) Dean Wilson 167 |
| 2022 | (Germany) Ken Roczen 116 | (United States) Joey Savatgy 112 | (United States) Vince Friese 112 |
Demerged from AMA Supercross Championship
| 2021 | (United States) Cooper Webb 388 | (Germany) Ken Roczen 353 | (United States) Eli Tomac 326 |
| 2020 | (United States) Eli Tomac 384 | (United States) Cooper Webb 359 | (Germany) Ken Roczen 354 |
| 2019 | (United States) Cooper Webb 379 | (United States) Eli Tomac 361 | (France) Marvin Musquin 350 |
| 2018 | (United States) Jason Anderson 356 | (France) Marvin Musquin 347 | (United States) Eli Tomac 318 |
| 2017 | (United States) Ryan Dungey 359 | (United States) Eli Tomac 354 | (France) Marvin Musquin 293 |
| 2016 | (United States) Ryan Dungey | (Germany) Ken Roczen | (United States) Jason Anderson |
| 2015 | (United States) Ryan Dungey | (United States) Eli Tomac | (United States) Cole Seely |
| 2014 | (United States) Ryan Villopoto | (United States) Ryan Dungey | (Germany) Ken Roczen |
| 2013 | (United States) Ryan Villopoto | (United States) Davi Millsaps | (United States) Ryan Dungey |
| 2012 | (United States) Ryan Villopoto | (United States) Ryan Dungey | (United States) Davi Millsaps |
| 2011 | (United States) Ryan Villopoto | (Australia) Chad Reed | (United States) Ryan Dungey |
| 2010 | (United States) Ryan Dungey | (United States) Kevin Windham | (United States) Davi Millsaps |
| 2009 | (United States) James Stewart Jr. 377 | (Australia) Chad Reed 373 | (United States) Andrew Short 270 |
| 2008 | (Australia) Chad Reed 356 | (United States) Kevin Windham 352 | (United States) Andrew Short 281 |
Merged with AMA Supercross Championship
| 2007 | (United States) James Stewart Jr. | (Australia) Chad Reed | (United States) Tim Ferry |
| 2006 | (United States) James Stewart Jr. | (United States) Ricky Carmichael | (Australia) Chad Reed |
| 2005 | (United States) Ricky Carmichael | (United States) Mike LaRocco | (United States) Heath Voss |
| 2004 | (United States) Heath Voss | (United States) Damon Huffman | (United States) Tyler Evans |
| 2003 | (Australia) Chad Reed | (United States) Tim Ferry | (United States) Heath Voss |
| 2002 | Not Held | | |
| 2001 | Not Held | | |
| 2000 | (United States) Mike LaRocco | (United States) Greg Albertyn | (France) Thierry Bethys |
| 1999 | (France) David Vuillemin | (France) Sebastien Tortelli | (United States) Jeremy McGrath |
| 1998 | (United States) Robbie Reynard | (France) David Vuillemin | (United States) Larry Ward |
| 1997 | (United States) Damon Huffman | (France) Mickael Pichon | (United States) Jeff Emig |
| 1996 | (United States) Jeff Emig | (United States) Ryan Hughes | (United States) Damon Huffman |
| 1995 | (United States) Jeremy McGrath | (United States) Larry Ward | (United States) Steve Lamson |
| 1994 | (United States) Jeremy McGrath | (United States) Mike LaRocco | (United States) Jimmy Button |
| 1993 | (United States) Guy Cooper | (United States) Greg Albertyn | (United States) Larry Ward |
| 1992 | (United States) Jeff Stanton | (United States) Michael Craig | (United States) Kyle Lewis |

== Television coverage ==
Australia

- 7plus: All races live and free

(European Union) Europe

- Viaplay every race live
- WSX.tv: races on 24hr delay

United Kingdom

- BT Sport: Every race live

United States

- Fox Sports 1: Every race live
- WSX.tv: races on 24hr delay

(United Nations) International (territories without a distinct partner):

- WSX.tv: all races live
