= 2009 AMA Supercross Championship =

The 2009 AMA Supercross season (for sponsorship reasons, the Monster Energy AMA Supercross Championship) was the thirty-sixth AMA Supercross Championship season. It was also the second season with the World Supercross Championship designation. James Stewart Jr. claimed his second title, after winning eleven of the seventeen rounds.

== Riders ==
- Riders denoted by state of birth, unless an overseas rider.

Plate	Riders	Make of bike
1	(Australia) Chad Reed	Suzuki
2	(Washington (state)) Ryan Villopoto	Kawasaki
3	(Tennessee) Mike Brown	KTM
7	(Florida) James Stewart Jr.	Yamaha
9	(New Mexico) Ivan Tedesco	Honda
11	(California) Travis Preston	KTM
13	(Minnesota) Heath Voss	Honda
14	(Louisiana) Kevin Windham	Honda
15	(Florida) Tim Ferry	Kawasaki
17	(Oklahoma) Robbie Reynard	Honda
18	(Georgia (U.S. state)) Davi Millsaps	Honda
21	(New Zealand) Cody Cooper	Yamaha
25	(Alabama) Nathan Ramsey	Yamaha
26	(Australia) Michael Byrne	Suzuki
27	(Michigan) Nick Wey	Yamaha
28	(North Carolina) Josh Summey	KTM
29	(Texas) Andrew Short	Honda
31	(Kentucky) Ryan Sipes	KTM
33	(California) Josh Grant	Yamaha
35	(New York (state)) Paul Carpenter	Kawasaki
37	(Brazil) Antonio Balbi	Honda
38	(Florida) Kyle Chisholm	Yamaha
45	(Florida) Jason Thomas	Honda
48	(Texas) Thomas Hahn	Kawasaki
52	(New York (state)) Robert Kiniry	Kawasaki
54	(Florida) Matt Boni	Honda
57	(Michigan) Jacob Marsack	Honda
59	(Florida) Troy Adams	Honda
60	(Pennsylvania) Broc Hepler	Yamaha
65	(Florida) Shaun Skinner	Honda
71	(Kentucky) Justin Sipes	KTM
75	(Oregon) Josh Hill	Yamaha
78	(California) Billy Laninovich	Kawasaki
79	(Idaho) Cole Siebler	Honda
80	(North Carolina) Tyler Bright	Kawasaki
91	(New Hampshire) Chad Charbonneau	Kawasaki
94	(Massachusetts) Jacob Morrison	Yamaha
95	(Alaska) Ben Lamay	Yamaha
99	(Georgia (U.S. state)) Jase Lewis	Kawasaki
100	(California) Josh Hansen	Honda
101	(New Zealand) Ben Townley	Honda
105	(California) Sean Hamblin	Yamaha
112	(Denmark) Marco Lewentdorff	KTM
114	(Iowa) Justin Brayton	KTM
115	(New Mexico) Kevin Johnson	Yamaha
121	(Texas) Jeff Dement	Honda
125	(California) Daniel Blair	Honda
130	(Florida) Kyle Keylon	Honda
131	(California) Ryan Beat	Kawasaki
141	(France) Steve Boniface	Honda
147	(Texas) Clayton Miller	Honda
150	(Ohio) Scott Metz	Kawasaki
153	(Washington (state)) Gregory Crater	Honda
158	(New Mexico) Keith Johnson	Yamaha
173	(Nevada) Nathan Tiearney	Honda
186	(Nevada) Derek Costella	Honda
199	(Maryland) Travis Pastrana	Suzuki
207	(California) Sean Collier	Yamaha
212	(California) Chris Hay	Honda
221	(Oregon) Tiger Lacey	Honda
229	(California) Jeff Loop	Kawasaki
296	(Illinois) Bryan White	Honda
304	(Indiana) Bradley Ripple	Honda
321	(Alabama) Chad Ward	Kawasaki

== Calendar ==
- All races held in (United States) , except Toronto (Canada) . Riders denoted by state of birth, unless an overseas rider.

Round	Venue	Location	Date	Heat 1	Heat 2	LCQ	Winner
1	Angel Stadium of Anaheim	Anaheim, California	January 3	(Washington (state)) Ryan Villopoto	(Florida) James Stewart Jr.	(Florida) Matt Boni	(California) Josh Grant
2	Chase Field	Phoenix, Arizona	January 10	(Australia) Chad Reed	(Florida) James Stewart Jr.	(Florida) Matt Boni	(Florida) James Stewart Jr.
3	Angel Stadium of Anaheim	Anaheim, California	January 17	(Australia) Chad Reed	(Florida) James Stewart Jr.	(New York (state)) Robert Kiniry	(Florida) James Stewart Jr.
4	Reliant Stadium	(Texas) Houston	January 24	(Australia) Chad Reed	(Florida) James Stewart Jr.	(California) Josh Hansen	(Florida) James Stewart Jr.
5	AT&T Park	(California) San Francisco	January 31	(California) Josh Grant	(Florida) James Stewart Jr.	(Florida) Davi Millsaps	(Florida) James Stewart Jr.
6	Angel Stadium of Anaheim	Anaheim, California	February 7	(Florida) Davi Millsaps	(Florida) James Stewart Jr.	(Oklahoma) Andrew Short	(Florida) James Stewart Jr.
7	Qualcomm Stadium	(California) San Diego	February 14	(Oklahoma) Andrew Short	(Florida) James Stewart Jr.	(Florida) Davi Millsaps	(Florida) James Stewart Jr.
8	Georgia Dome	(Georgia (U.S. state)) Atlanta	February 21	(Australia) Chad Reed	(Florida) James Stewart Jr.	(North Carolina) Charles Summey	(Florida) James Stewart Jr.
9	Lucas Oil Stadium	(Indiana) Indianapolis	February 28	(Florida) Davi Millsaps	(Florida) James Stewart Jr.	(Oregon) Josh Hill	(Australia) Chad Reed
10	Daytona International Speedway	Daytona Beach, Florida	March 7	(Florida) James Stewart Jr.	(Oregon) Josh Hill	(Florida) Davi Millsaps	(Australia) Chad Reed
11	Louisiana Superdome	(Louisiana) New Orleans	March 14	(Australia) Chad Reed	(Florida) James Stewart Jr.	(Alabama) Nathan Ramsey	(Florida) James Stewart Jr.
12	Edward Jones Dome	St. Louis, Missouri	March 21	(Australia) Chad Reed	(Louisiana) Kevin Windham	(Florida) Davi Millsaps	(Australia) Chad Reed
13	Rogers Centre	(Ontario) Toronto	March 28	(Australia) Chad Reed	(Florida) James Stewart Jr.	(Michigan) Jacob Marsack	(Florida) James Stewart Jr.
14	Jacksonville Municipal Stadium	Jacksonville, Florida	April 4	(Australia) Chad Reed	(Florida) James Stewart Jr.	(Oregon) Josh Hill	(Florida) James Stewart Jr.
15	Qwest Field	(Washington (state)) Seattle, Washington	April 18	(New Mexico) Ivan Tedesco	(Florida) James Stewart Jr.	(California) Billy Laninovich	(Washington (state)) Ryan Villopoto
16	Rice-Eccles Stadium	(Utah) Salt Lake City	April 25	(Australia) Chad Reed	(Florida) James Stewart Jr.	(California) Billy Laninovich	(Florida) James Stewart Jr.
17	Sam Boyd Stadium	Whitney, Nevada	May 2	(Australia) Chad Reed	(Florida) James Stewart Jr.	(New York (state)) Robert Kiniry	(Washington (state)) Ryan Villopoto

== Championship standings ==
Pos	Rider	ANA1 (California)	PHX (Arizona)	ANA2 (California)	HOU (Texas)	SFR (California)	ANA3 (California)	SDI (California)	ATL (Georgia (U.S. state))	IND (Indiana)	DAY (Florida)	NOR (Louisiana)	STL (Missouri)	TOR (Ontario)	JAC (Florida)	SEA (Washington (state))	SLC (Utah)	LAS (Nevada)	Points
1	(Florida) James Stewart Jr.	19	1	1	1	1	1	1	1	2	7	1	2	1	1	2	1	3	377
2	Chad Reed	3	2	2	2	2	2	2	2	1	1	2	1	2	2	7	2	2	373
3	(Oklahoma) Andrew Short	2	5	6	4	5	6	3	4	11	8	5	4	9	5	5	5	8	270
4	(California) Josh Grant	1	3	5	5	4	5	20	13	4	DNQ	7	3	4	18	6	6	7	237
5	(Louisiana) Kevin Windham	15	6	3	9	6	7	7	6	20	5	4	9	6	3	10	7	4	236
6	(Washington (state)) Ryan Villopoto	5	7	4	3	3	DNQ	4	3	9	6	9	INJ	INJ	INJ	1	4	1	233
7	(New Mexico) Ivan Tedesco	6	4	7	6	10	4	10	7	5	13	13	6	5	13	9	10	5	226
8	(Florida) Davi Millsaps	12	10	10	10	8	3	5	10	7	3	18	8	7	19	3	3	10	219
9	(California) Mike Alessi	11	11	9	7	9	11	6	11	3	4	6	7	11	6	4	DNQ	6	218
10	(Oregon) Josh Hill	16	8	12	11	7	8	DNQ	9	15	11	11	15	3	4	INJ	INJ	INJ	146
11	(Florida) Matt Boni	14	20	20	15	DNQ	12	DNQ	12	12	18	10	12	8	16	14	8	14	110
12	(Minnesota) Heath Voss	7	INJ	14	12	11	16	15	DNQ	13	15	16	17	DNQ	9	12	14	20	103
13	(Florida) Tim Ferry	4	9	8	8	DNQ	10	14	8	10	19	INJ	INJ	INJ	INJ	INJ	INJ	INJ	100
14	(Michigan) Nick Wey	9	15	13	DNQ	DNQ	15	9	15	16	DNQ	12	DNQ	15	DNQ	11	12	12	98
15	(New York (state)) Paul Carpenter	10	13	11	13	19	14	DNQ					10	14	20	8	11	13	96
16	(Florida) Kyle Chisholm	DNQ	DNQ	DNQ	17	14	9	13	14	DNQ	16	19	13	13	18	16	DSQ	EX	79
17	(Pennsylvania) Broc Hepler							19	5	19	12	3	14	17	11		15	DNQ	76
18	(France) Ben Coisy	8	DNQ	17	16	12	DNQ	18	19	6	17	DNQ	DNQ	10	12	DNQ	DNQ	INJ	75
19	(Kansas) Thomas Hahn						19	12	16	DNQ	10		20	19	7	13	9	18	67
20	(New Jersey) Jason Lawrence									DNQ	2		5	20	17				43
Pos	Rider	ANA1 (California)	PHX (Arizona)	ANA2 (California)	HOU (Texas)	SFR (California)	ANA3 (California)	SDI (California)	ATL (Georgia (U.S. state))	IND (Indiana)	DAY (Florida)	NOR (Louisiana)	STL (Missouri)	TOR (Ontario)	JAC (Florida)	SEA (Washington (state))	SLC (Utah)	LAS (Nevada)	Points

Colour	Result
Gold	Winner
Silver	Second place
Bronze	Third place
Green	Points classification
Blue	Non-points classification
Blue	Non-classified finish (NC)
Purple	Retired, not classified (Ret)
Red	Did not qualify (DNQ)
Red	Did not pre-qualify (DNPQ)
Black	Disqualified (DSQ)
White	Did not start (DNS)
White	Withdrew (WD)
White	Race cancelled (C)
Blank	Did not practice (DNP)
Blank	Did not arrive (DNA)
Blank	Excluded (EX)

== See also ==
- Supercross; for champions of the supporting East and West Lites series.
