= 2007 World Supercross GP =

The 2007 FIM World Supercross GP season is a multi race tournament over a season for supercross. The season started on 2 December 2006 and will last until 5 May 2007. The competition is organised by the FIM.

== Calendar ==
Date	Place	Winner	Second	Third
December 2, 2006	(Canada) Toronto, Ontario	(Australia) Chad Reed	(United States) Ricky Carmichael	(United States) James Stewart Jr.
December 9, 2006	(Canada) Vancouver, British Columbia	(United States) Ricky Carmichael	(United States) James Stewart Jr.	(Australia) Chad Reed
January 6, 2007	(United States) Anaheim, California	(United States) James Stewart Jr.	(United States) Ricky Carmichael	(Australia) Chad Reed
January 13, 2007	(United States) Phoenix, Arizona	(United States) James Stewart Jr.	(United States) Ricky Carmichael	(Australia) Chad Reed
January 20, 2007	(United States) Anaheim, California	(United States) James Stewart Jr.	(Australia) Chad Reed	(United States) Nick Wey
January 27, 2007	(United States) San Francisco, California	(United States) Ricky Carmichael	(United States) James Stewart Jr.	(Australia) Chad Reed
February 3, 2007	(United States) Anaheim, California	(United States) James Stewart Jr.	(Australia) Chad Reed	(United States) Tim Ferry
February 10, 2007	(United States) Houston, Texas	(United States) James Stewart Jr.	(Australia) Chad Reed	(United States) Tim Ferry
February 17, 2007	(United States) San Diego, California	(Australia) Chad Reed	(United States) Tim Ferry	(United States) Kevin Windham
February 24, 2007	(United States) Atlanta, Georgia	(United States) James Stewart Jr.	(United States) Ricky Carmichael	(Australia) Chad Reed
March 3, 2007	(United States) St. Louis, Missouri	(United States) Ricky Carmichael	(United States) James Stewart Jr.	(Australia) Chad Reed
March 9, 2007	(United States) Daytona Beach, Florida	(United States) James Stewart Jr.	(United States) Ricky Carmichael	(Australia) Chad Reed
March 17, 2007	(United States) Orlando, Florida	(United States) James Stewart Jr.	(United States) Ricky Carmichael	(Australia) Chad Reed
March 24, 2007	(United States) Indianapolis, Indiana	(United States) James Stewart Jr.	(Australia) Chad Reed	(United States) Tim Ferry
March 31, 2007	(United States) Irving, Texas	(United States) James Stewart Jr.	(Australia) Chad Reed	(United States) Tim Ferry
April 21, 2007	(United States) Detroit, Michigan	(United States) James Stewart Jr.	(Australia) Chad Reed	(United States) Tim Ferry
April 28, 2007	(United States) Seattle, Washington	(United States) James Stewart Jr.	(United States) Davi Millsaps	(United States) Kevin Windham
May 5, 2007	(United States) Las Vegas, Nevada	(United States) James Stewart Jr.	(Australia) Chad Reed	(United States) Kevin Windham

== Overall Results ==
Pos.	Crosser	Points	TOR	VAN	ANA1	PHO	ANA2	SFR	ANA3	HOU	SDI	ATL	STL	ORL	IND	DET	DAL	SEA	LVE
1.	(United States) James Stewart Jr.	404	20	22	25	25	25	22	25	25	18	25	22	25	25	25	25	25	25
2.	(Australia) Chad Reed	364	25	20	20	20	22	20	22	22	25	20	20	20	22	22	22	20	22
3.	(United States) Tim Ferry	302	18	16	16	16	18	18	20	20	22	16	6	16	20	20	20	22	18
4.	(France) David Vuillemin	240	16	18	15	4	11	15	10	12	13	14	16	15	16	15	18	16	16
5.	(Australia) Michael Byrne	211	6	2	12	15	16	13	16	16	16	8	7	11	15	18	9	18	13
6.	(United States) Ivan Tedesco	185	0	0	8	14	14	8	12	14	20	18	4	18	18	11	15	12	20
7.	(United States) Paul Carpenter	194	13	9	11	5	15	7	13	13	14	4	15	12	9	16	14	13	11
8.	(United States) Heath Voss	189	12	10	13	12	9	10	14	15	15	13	14	14	8	0	16	0	14
9.	(United States) Ricky Carmichael	185	22	25	22	22	0	25	0	0	0	22	25	22	0	0	0	0	0
10.	(United States) Jeff Gibson	171	11	13	7	8	10	12	9	6	9	12	10	6	12	14	11	14	7
11.	(United States) Josh Summey	124	2	5	0	0	13	11	4	0	10	0	3	13	14	7	12	15	15
12.	(United States) Travis Preston	122	5	14	18	18	0	14	11	18	12	10	2	0	0	0	0	0	0
13.	(United States) Nicholas Wey.	91	15	12	14	13	20	16	18	0	0	0	0	0	0	0	0	0	0
14.	(United States) Nathan Ramsey	91	0	15	0	11	12	9	15	4	0	7	18	0	0	0	0	0	0
15.	(United States) Jason Thomas	89	7	11	4	9	6	0	0	0	4	9	0	8	0	6	13	0	12
