= Chad Reed =

Australian motorcycle racer (born 1982)

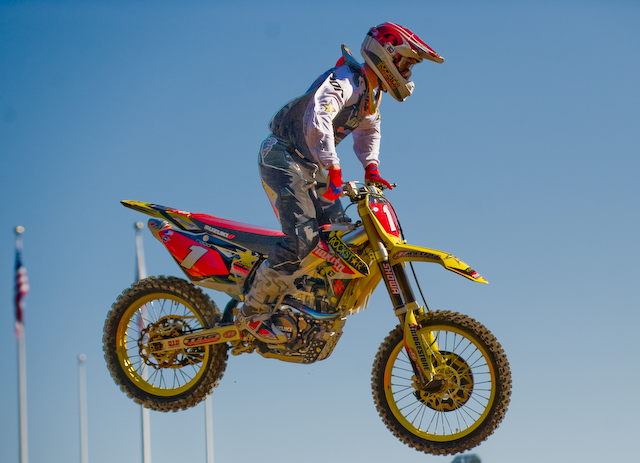
- Reed in 2009
- Nationality: Australian
- Born: 15 March 1982 (age 44) Kurri Kurri, New South Wales, Australia

Motocross career
- Years active: 1998–2020
- Teams: •Troy Yamaha (2003-2006); •San Manuel L&M Racing Yamaha (2007-2008); •Rockstar Energy Makita Suzuki (2009); •Monster Energy Kawasaki (2010); •Team TwoTwo Motorsports (2011-2015); •Monster Energy Factory Yamaha (2016-2017)
- Championships: •2002 AMA Supercross 125cc East; •2004 AMA Supercross 250cc; •2008 AMA Supercross 450cc; •2009 AMA Motocross 450cc
- Wins: •AMA 125/250cc Motocross: 1; •AMA 125/250cc Supercross: 6; •AMA 250/450cc Motocross: 10; •AMA 250/450cc Supercross: 44; Total: 61

Chad Mark Reed (born 15 March 1982, in Kurri Kurri, Australia) is an Australian former professional motocross and supercross racer. He is a two-time AMA Supercross 450cc champion, a one-time AMA Motocross 450cc champion, record holder for the most main event starts in AMA Supercross history with 265 starts, as well as podium finishes with 132.

== Amateur career ==
As a child, Reed owned a horse named Fern. After his cousin Craig Anderson started riding a bike, Reed discovered his interest in motorcycles and decided to trade in his horse in place for his first bike - a Yamaha PW50. The family soon purchased a small property located just outside of Kurri Kurri. The 25-acre property was overgrown with thick bushland and was yet to even have a house or electricity on the land. The family went to the property to clear the tea tree shrubs by hand at any spare chance they could find, which resulted in the family home being built along with several tracks for Chad to practice on.

Reed's family supported him along the way in his early years of competition. Without fail, weekend after weekend, his father Mark, his mother Robyn, and his younger brother Troy, spent the majority of their time traveling around Australia so that Chad could compete against the rest of the country. Chad was often dubbed the 'underdog', but that was certainly something that would change in the future. Honing in on his skills on 80cc bikes, Reed's amateur career started to take off in 1997 when he took the top spot at the Australian Junior Championship.

== Australian career ==
=== 1998-2000 ===
Reed formally began his professional career in Australia in 1998. He emerged from the Australian junior ranks to compete in the then-premier 250cc class, bypassing the traditional stepping stone of 125cc racing. Reed was immediately competitive in both motocross and supercross, winning the Australian 250cc Supercross Championship in 1999 and 2000.

=== 2007 ===
Reed revisited his home in Australia to race the Raymond Terrace, round 4, of the Australian Motocross series. He beat Daniel Reardon with a 1-1 performance, providing Reardon with international notoriety for holding Reed off for a significant portion of the races.

=== 2008 ===
In 2008, Reed was responsible for developing and partially funding the new Australian Supercross Championships, dubbed Super-X. He also competed in the series and dominated all but one race to take the Australian Supercross Championship. Reed won six out of the seven races.

=== 2009 ===
Reed, now aboard his new Monster Energy Kawasaki KX-450F, won four out of the seven rounds of the series. Reed won the championship by beating Daniel Reardon by 23 points. This was Reed's fourth Australian Supercross Championship.

=== 2010 ===
Reed raced the first round of the 2010 Super X series held at the Newcastle International Sports Centre, Newcastle on a Honda sponsored by Vodafone. Reed won the event beating Americans Josh Hansen and Justin Brayton who finished in second and third respectively.

== International career ==
=== 2001 ===
Reed travelled to Europe in 2001 to compete in the FIM World 250ccc Motocross Championships, riding for Jan DeGroot's factory Kawasaki team. Reed was a revelation aboard his KX250, winning the Grand Prix of Lierop (Netherlands) and eventually finishing the year second to multi-time World Champion Mickaël Pichon. He is the first Australian to win a world 250cc GP race.

=== 2002 ===
Reed moved to the United States in 2002 and picked up a ride with Yamaha of Troy. Reed won all but two Supercross races that season to win the 125cc East Coast Supercross championship.

Reed won his first and only 125cc National victory at Mount Morris, Pennsylvania, and finished the third season behind James Stewart Jr. and Branden Jesseman.

Reed's first-ever SX race was in San Diego, California.

=== 2003 ===
Reed moved to the 250cc class in 2003 riding for Factory Yamaha. In his rookie 250cc Supercross season, Reed finished second to chief rival Ricky Carmichael, losing the title by only seven points to Carmichael despite winning eight races to Carmichael's seven.

Reed finished his first 250cc Motocross season a distant third behind Carmichael and Kevin Windham.

=== 2004 ===
In 2004, Reed won the 2004 AMA 250cc Supercross series, battling with Kevin Windham, Michael Byrne, and Tim Ferry, with Reed earning ten victories for the season.

Reed finished second to Carmichael in that year's motocross season.

=== 2005 ===
2005 marked the entry of James Stewart to the 250cc class alongside Reed and Carmichael. Each scored multiple wins. Carmichael won the championship with seven wins, Reed was in second with five wins, and Stewart was in third with three wins.

=== 2006 ===
In 2006, despite suffering a level three shoulder separation mid-season, Reed remained highly competitive. His injury, however, hindered his ability to compete at his highest level. In the final event of the season, Reed and Carmichael were tied for the points lead, resulting in the closest AMA Supercross championship in history. Reed secured third place that night, while Carmichael took second place, resulting in Reed narrowly losing the 2006 AMA Supercross title to Carmichael by only two points. Throughout the season, Reed won two races. Reed's shoulder injury resurfaced, causing him to withdraw from the Nationals after the Millville round, where he had held second place.

=== 2007 ===
In 2007, Reed announced his plans to leave the factory KTM team to form his own private team, similar to Jeremy McGrath in the past. Obtaining support from Yamaha, The San Manuel Band of Mission Indians, Thor, and Nike, even brought in McGrath's former team manager Larry Brooks to spearhead the new effort, dubbed L&M Racing. Reed took one win for the season and finished second in the title chase to James Stewart Jr.

=== 2008 ===
In 2008, Reed won nine out of 14 races in the AMA Supercross season to edge out Kevin Windham and win the AMA Supercross title for the second time. This was a season full of great battles with Reed duking it out against Davi Millsaps, Kevin Windham, and Josh Hill for race wins, with Reed, in the end, winning the championship by 13 points over Kevin Windham.

=== 2009 ===
Reed joined team Rockstar Makita Suzuki for the 2009 season. Reed battled hard with his rival James Stewart Jr. during the 2009 AMA Supercross championship, with the pair coming to blows on more than one occasion. He narrowly lost the title to Stewart by four points. Reed won three races this season.

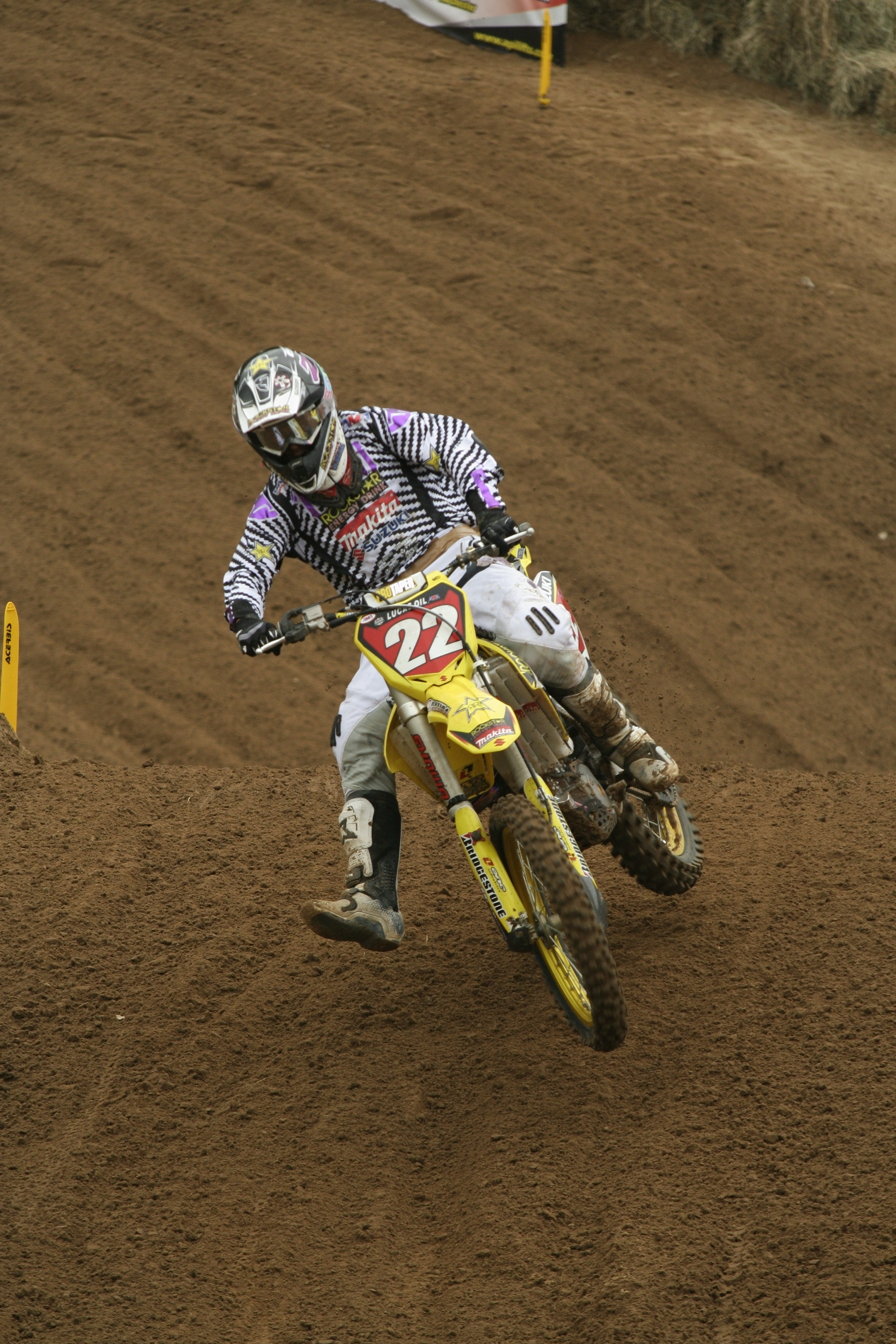
Reed in 2009 at the Spring Creek National

Reed elected to race the 2009 motocross season after a two-year hiatus. He won the AMA Motocross Championship at round ten, out of the 12-round series. He also won the Monster Energy Triple Crown Championship during the motocross season. He won five out of the 12 races in this season.

=== 2010 ===
For the 2010 season, Reed joined new teammate Ryan Villopoto riding the KX-450F for the Monster Energy Kawasaki Racing Team. Reed failed to finish during the round one final due to a collision with another racer's footpeg, breaking spokes in his front wheel. During round two, he collided with James Stewart Jr. in the final, breaking his hand which resulted in another DNF. Reed returned to race round 13 of the Supercross series, and despite having a bad start, Reed finished fourth. He withdrew from the competition stating he had Epstein-Barr virus. In an open letter published on his website, Reed admitted that becoming a new dad and also the death of his close personal friend Andrew McFarlane may be reasons people look to for his poor performance.

=== 2011 ===
After racing & winning the first round of Super X in Newcastle, Australia in October, Reed returned to the US to test various bikes and teams searching for a suitable 2011 team structure. Reed embraced social media using Twitter to publish hints as to the likely brand of bike and apparel that he would be using in the 2011 AMA Supercross series. Failing negotiations with established teams, Reed decided to create his own team, TwoTwo Motorsports, aboard a Honda CRF450R, with support from Honda, Bel-Ray, Shift and many other sponsors. The 2011 season had been a five-way battle between Reed, Ryan Villopoto, James Stewart Jr., Ryan Dungey and Trey Canard. It came down to the final race in Las Vegas between Ryan Villopoto, Reed, and Ryan Dungey. Reed won the Las Vegas race but lost the championship by four points to Ryan Villopoto. Reed was presented with the "2011 Rock Hard - Ride Hard Bret Michaels Supercross Award." at Vegas for his great work starting a new team and still finishing second in the championship.

=== 2012 ===
While competing at the seventh round of the 2012 AMA Supercross series in Dallas, Texas and going in an Epic Battle with Ryan Villopoto, Reed crashed and sustained numerous injuries including his left knee. The most serious of the injuries required surgery for a torn ACL. Consequently, Reed was forced to drop out of the 2012 title chase while sitting second in overall championship points.

=== 2013 ===
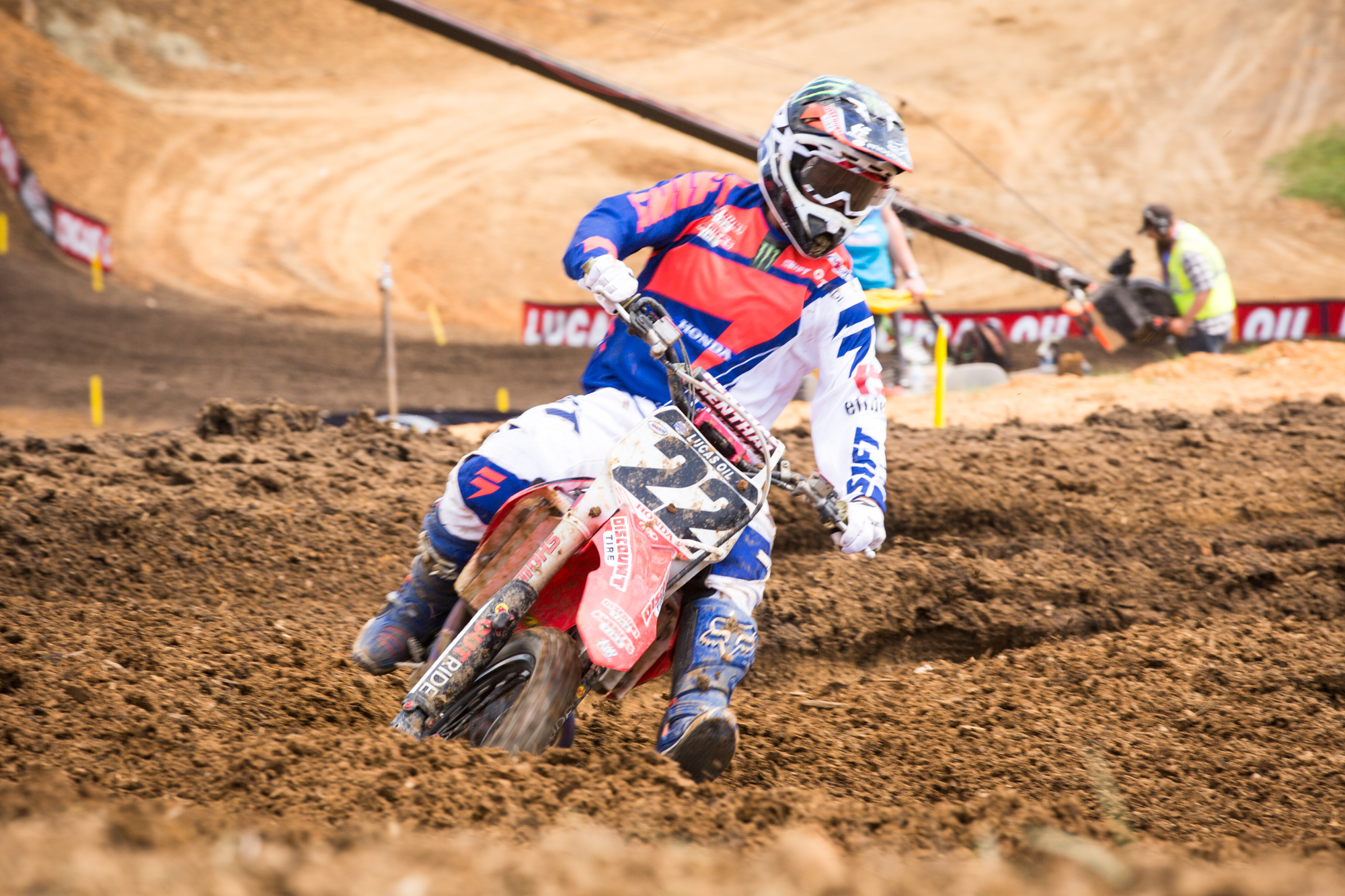
Reed in 2013

After the long hiatus, Reed returned to racing with his new bike and a new sponsor, Discount Tire, but he kept his TwoTwo Motorsports Honda. While battling with Ryan Villopoto, Davi Millsaps, Ryan Dungey, Trey Canard and Justin Barcia, Reed struggled to ride hard and pass for the lead. On 23 March 2013, after the race in Toronto, Canada Reed announced that he underwent knee surgery on Tuesday, and missed one round of competition in Houston, Texas. He came back to Minneapolis to race, however, in the Main Event in Seattle. Reed crashed in the first corner, where he tweaked his right arm. He came back to Salt Lake City, but had problems with his engine, putting him in the LCQ. In the Main Event in Salt Lake City, he was lapped by the leaders Ryan Villopoto, Davi Millsaps, and Ryan Dungey on Lap 16, and finished in tenth place.

=== 2014 ===
After a disappointing 2013 season, finishing twice on the podium, one in Anaheim 2, and the other in St. Louis, Reed returned to racing. He switched brands from Honda to Kawasaki, but he continued to ride for his team TwoTwo Motorsports and for Discount Tire. Throughout the season, Reed continued to struggle and ride a new bike. He finished third in the season ppener in Anaheim. He got back up passed Ken Roczen for second place and then James Stewart Jr. for the lead, won the third round in Anaheim 2, and got back up leading all 20 laps and won the fifth round in Anaheim 3. While competing at Round 6 at Qualcomm Stadium in San Diego, Reed crashed hard in the whoops on the final lap after clipping Ken Roczen's rear wheel as he tried to take over third place and then suffered a shoulder injury. He tried to race in Arlington, Texas during qualifying practice and his shoulder is getting worse due to a broken collarbone. Consequently, Reed was forced to drop out the remainder of the ten rounds of the 2014 AMA Supercross Series while sitting second in overall championship points. In the Lucas Oil MX Series, he finished around tenth overall in the points and won two holeshots.

=== 2015 ===
In 2015, Reed would see one of his most disappointing professional seasons earning one win in the Supercross Championship along with two podium finishes. He would withdraw from the AMA Motocross championship midway through the season due to motocross competing sponsorship reasons. He would later announce the folding of his TwoTwo Motorsports Team which was founded in 2011. Reed would later announce that he would be riding a Yamaha for the continuation of the 2015 season and the 2015 Monster Energy Cup.

=== 2016 ===
In 2016, Reed competed in the 2016 AMA Monster Energy Supercross Championship with Factory Yamaha. His sponsors include Yamaha Motor Corporation, Monster Energy, Yamalube, Chaparral Motorsports, Yamaha Financial Services, Oakley Motorsports, and Pro Circuit.

=== 2018 ===
Reed obtained the world record for the most career Monster Energy Supercross main event starts ever.

=== 2019 ===
On 2 February, Reed finished in the top-five (fifth place) at the AMA Monster Energy Supercross in San Diego. On 23 February, he finished on the podium in third in the AMA Monster Energy Supercross in Detroit, Increasing his record of most all-time AMA Supercross podiums to 132. On 23 March, he crashed at the start of the main event during the Seattle, WA supercross event. He sustained multiple injuries including a broken scapula, eight rib fractures, and a collapsed lung ending his 2019 Supercross season.

=== 2020 ===
In the previous year, Reed had announced that 2020 would be his last season. Midway through the year after the break caused by COVID-19, Reed switched from Honda to KTM. His best finish in 2020 was a tenth at the finale.

== Sponsorships ==
Reed has ridden for a variety of sponsors over his career, including: Yamaha Motor Company, Husqvarna, Monster Energy, Red Bull, Oakley, Fox Racing, Shift, Discount Tire, Boost Mobile, Pro Circuit, 360 Fly Camera, and Penrite.

== In popular culture ==
The 2004 motorcycle racing game MX Unleashed is titled Chad Reed MX Unleashed in Australia.

== Career AMA Supercross/Motocross Results ==
Year	Rnd 1	Rnd 2	Rnd 3	Rnd 4	Rnd 5	Rnd 6	Rnd 7	Rnd 8	Rnd 9	Rnd 10	Rnd 11	Rnd 12	Rnd 13	Rnd 14	Rnd 15	Rnd 16	Rnd 17	Average Finish	Podium Percent	Place
2002 125 SX-E	-	-	-	-	-	1	1	1	1	1	-	1	2	-	-	2	-	1.25	100%	1st
2002 125 MX	3	2	1	10	2	6	7	3	10	2	4	10	-	-	-	-	-	5.00	50%	2nd
2003 250 SX	1	2	6	2	2	1	6	2	3	2	1	1	1	1	1	1	-	2.06	88%	2nd
2003 250 MX	2	2	4	6	4	3	5	4	3	4	4	-	-	-	-	-	-	3.72	36%	3rd
2004 250 SX	1	2	1	1	2	1	1	2	1	1	1	3	1	1	2	2	-	1.43	100%	1st
2004 250 MX	3	3	2	2	3	2	2	2	10	2	6	2	-	-	-	-	-	3.25	83%	2nd
2005 250 SX	16	3	2	2	2	2	1	2	2	1	1	3	1	4	2	1	-	2.81	88%	2nd
2005 250 MX	2	6	2	2	10	3	3	OUT	OUT	OUT	OUT	OUT	-	-	-	-	-	4.57	71%	8th
2006 450 SX	2	2	2	5	2	3	1	2	3	2	5	3	3	1	2	3	-	2.56	88%	3rd
2006 450 MX	3	2	2	2	3	4	8	3	10	OUT	OUT	OUT	-	-	-	-	-	4.11	67%	6th
2007 450 SX	3	3	2	3	2	2	1	3	3	3	3	2	2	2	6	2	-	2.62	94%	2nd
2007 450 MX	OUT	OUT	OUT	3	OUT	OUT	OUT	OUT	OUT	OUT	OUT	OUT	-	-	-	-	-	3.00	100%	27th
2008 450 SX	1	2	1	1	1	1	2	6	1	7	7	1	1	12	2	2	1	2.88	76%	1st
2008 450 MX	OUT	OUT	OUT	OUT	OUT	OUT	OUT	OUT	OUT	OUT	OUT	OUT	-	-	-	-	-	OUT	OUT	OUT
2009 450 SX	3	2	2	2	2	2	2	2	1	1	2	1	2	2	7	2	2	2.17	94%	2nd
2009 450 MX	4	3	3	1	4	2	1	1	1	1	8	10	-	-	-	-	-	3.25	67%	1st
2010 450 SX	19	19	OUT	OUT	OUT	OUT	OUT	OUT	OUT	OUT	OUT	OUT	4	5	8	OUT	2	9.50	17%	17th
2010 450 MX	1	2	18	3	9	2	34	OUT	OUT	OUT	OUT	OUT	-	-	-	-	-	9.85	57%	11th
2011 450 SX	5	4	7	2	3	6	1	3	2	3	2	2	8	4	3	2	1	3.41	65%	2nd
2011 450 MX	1	1	3	1	3	1	5	4	4	39	4	7	-	-	-	-	-	6.08	50%	3rd
2012 450 SX	2	5	1	2	3	2	20	OUT	OUT	OUT	OUT	OUT	OUT	OUT	OUT	OUT	OUT	5.00	71%	12th
2012 450 MX	OUT	OUT	OUT	OUT	OUT	OUT	OUT	OUT	OUT	OUT	OUT	OUT	-	-	-	-	-	OUT	OUT	OUT
2013 450 SX	4	4	3	12	5	5	4	9	3	5	6	4	OUT	5	20	10	6	6.50	13%	5th
2013 450 MX	15	23	12	14	14	12	12	7	8	13	38	OUT	-	-	-	-	-	15.27	0%	15th
2014 450 SX	3	9	1	3	1	12	OUT	OUT	OUT	OUT	OUT	OUT	OUT	OUT	OUT	OUT	OUT	4.83	67%	14th
2014 450 MX	10	10	11	8	13	7	36	15	15	39	6	14	-	-	-	-	-	15.33	0%	11th
2015 450 SX	10	10	22	3	6	4	11	1	7	5	9	4	8	5	8	OUT	7	7.50	13%	4th
2016 450 SX	6	2	2	5	6	8	OUT	3	12	22	4	4	6	6	9	9	4	6.75	19%	5th

=== Recognition ===
- 1997 Australian Junior Motocross Champion
- 1999 Australian Supercross Champion
- 2000 Australian Supercross Champion
- 2001 Motocross of Nations (Belgium) - Race 2 (125/250), 1st Place
- 2002 AMA Eastern Regional Supercross Champion
- 2003 U.S Open Champion
- 2003 FIM World Supercross GP Champion
- 2004 U.S Open Champion
- 2004 AMA Supercross Champion
- 2005 X-Games Supermoto - Bronze Medal
- 2007 King of Bercy Supercross Champion
- 2007 Motocross of Nations (USA) - Race 1 (MX1/MX2), 2nd Place
- 2008 AMA/FIM World Supercross Champion
- 2008 Australian Supercross Champion
- 2009 Monster Energy Triple Crown Motocross Champion
- 2009 AMA National Pro Motocross Champion
- 2009 Motocross of Nations (Italy) - Race 1 (MX1/MX2), 2nd Place
- 2009 AMA Athlete of the Year
- 2009 Australian Supercross Champion
- 2011 Motocross of Nations (France) - Race 1 (MX1/MX2), 1st Place
- 2016 AUS-X Open Champion
- 2018 The Ironman of Supercross (Most AMA Supercross Starts Record)
- 2018 SX-Open Champion
- 2018 FIM Oceania Supercross Champion

== Honours ==
On 13 June 2011, Reed was awarded a Member of the Order of Australia for service to motorsports as a professional supercross motorcycle rider at national and international levels, and to the community.

== Bibliography ==
- Flack, Darryl (30 August 2023). The Immortals of Australian Motorcycle Racing: The World Champs (Part of the 7-volume comprehensive sports collection). Immortals of Australian Sport (7-book series). Gelding Street Press. ISBN 978-0-6452070-5-7.
