= Arthur Ting =

Arthur Ting is an American orthopaedic surgeon and the team orthopaedist for Menlo College, a private business school which competes on the NAIA circuit (California Pacific Conference). Ting is well known for his surgeries on motorcycle racers such as World Champions Michael Doohan, Nicky Hayden and Ben Spies. Ting works at the Fremont Sports Therapy and Surgery Center, which is responsible for the medical treatment of many Bay Area professional sports organizations. He earned his medical degree at Saint Louis University and did his residency at the University of Southern California. In May, 2004, he had his license to practice medicine revoked for allegedly issuing prescriptions in 1999 to three patients for whom he held no records. He was reinstated to serve five years' probation.

He is called "the doctor to the stars" and has caught flak for being the doctor for Barry Bonds of the San Francisco Giants.

He has worked with former Detroit Lions running back Barry Sanders, former San Francisco 49ers running back Roger Craig, Menlo College Mighty Oaks, lacrosse player Andrew Unkefer, golfer Tiger Woods, former Houston Rockets center Yao Ming, the Dallas Cowboys' Terrell Owens, and supercross racers James Stewart Jr. and Will Hahn.
