= Ryan Dungey =

American motorcycle racer (born 1989)

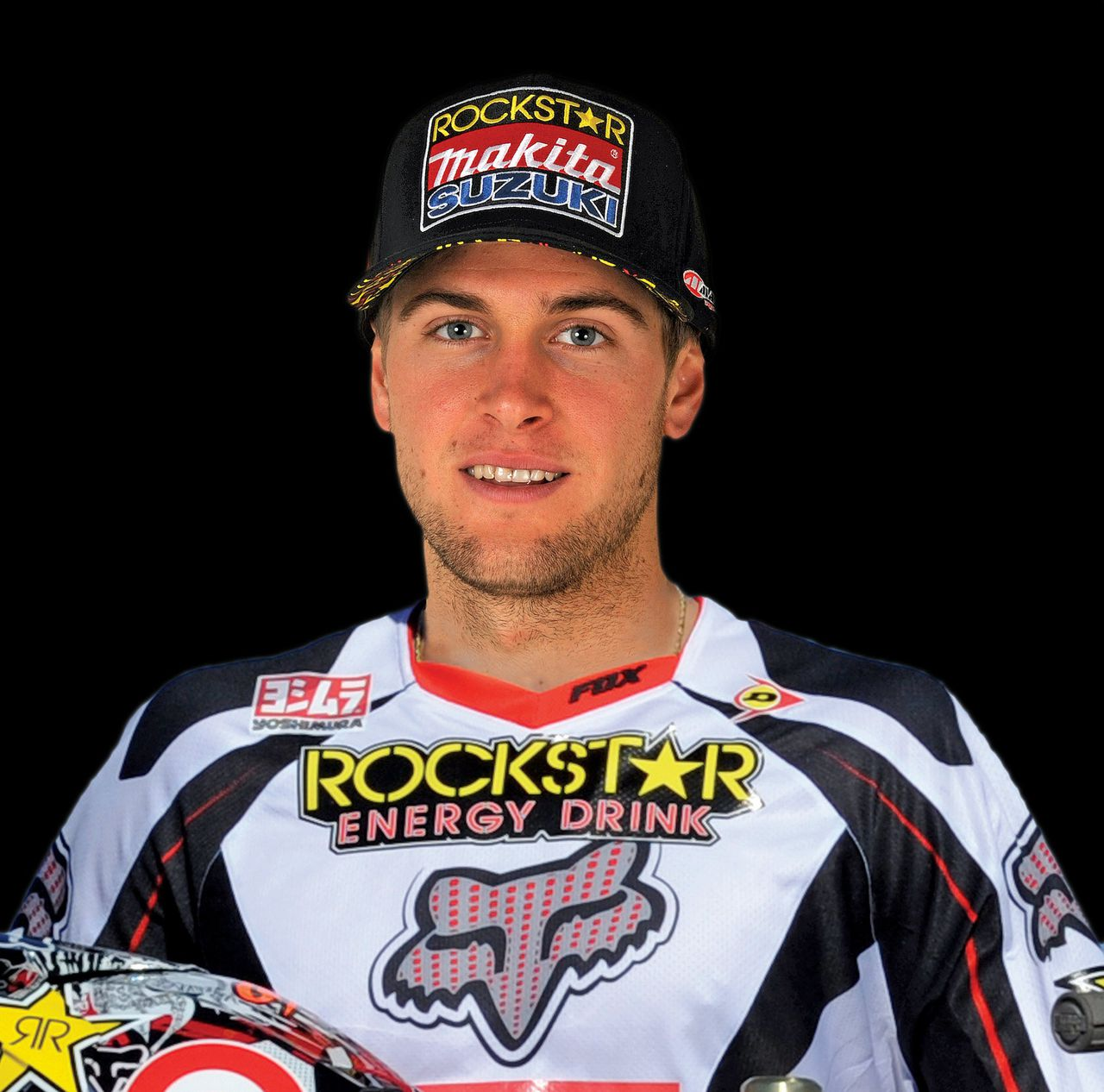
- Nationality: United States
- Born: December 4, 1989 (age 36) Belle Plaine, Minnesota

Motocross career
- Years active: 2006–2017, 2022
- Teams: •Rockstar Energy Makita Suzuki (2006–2011); •Red Bull KTM Factory Racing (2011–2017, 2022)
- Championships: •2009 AMA Supercross 250cc West; •2009 AMA 250cc Motocross; •2010 AMA Supercross 450cc; •2010 AMA 450cc Motocross; •2012 AMA 450cc Motocross; •2015 AMA Supercross 450cc; •2015 AMA 450cc Motocross; •2016 AMA Supercross 450cc; •2017 AMA Supercross 450cc
- Wins: • AMA 250cc Supercross: 12; • AMA 250cc Motocross: 7; • AMA 450cc Motocross: 39; • AMA 450cc Supercross: 34; • Total: 92

Ryan Dungey (born December 4, 1989) is an American retired professional motocross and supercross racer. He competed in the AMA Motocross Championships from 2006 to 2017 and again in 2022. He is a four-time 450cc AMA Supercross Champion, a three-time 450cc AMA Motocross Champion, a one-time 250cc AMA Supercross West & 250cc AMA Motocross Champion.

== Early life ==
Ryan Dungey was born in 1989 to Troy and Michelle Dungey in Belle Plaine, Minnesota. He has one older brother, Jade and one younger brother, Blake. Dungey's brothers and father were amateur racers as well. Dungey, who attended Guardian Angels Catholic School in Chaska, Minnesota, routinely expresses his Christian faith in interviews.

In 2006, at the age of 16, Dungey auditioned for and was signed to a pro contract.

== AMA Supercross & Motocross career ==
=== Amateur ===
As an amateur, Dungey did not shine in the mini classes. Once on the full-size bikes he started to improve to the point of winning races. Dungey capped his amateur career by winning the 2005 Loretta Lynn's Amateur Championship and was expected to repeat the following year.

=== 2006 ===
Dungey began the year in the amateur 250cc ranks. Despite being a "B" rider and generating mostly tenth-place finishes he attracted the attention of Suzuki team manager, Roger De Coster. Dungey entered his first professional race at his home track of Spring Creek in Millville, Minnesota. Dungey, number 142 on his plate, finished an impressive eighth in Moto 1 and eighth in Moto 2 for a seventh in the overall at one of the muddiest outdoor nationals on record. Dungey would show that this result was no fluke finishing with 13-13 results for 15th in the overall the next week in Broome-Tioga, NY. Dungey struggled the last 4 rounds, only finishing above 20th place two times in the final four motos. He finished with 50 Points total and 28th in the overall 250 MX standings.

=== 2007 ===
Dungey's first full year in the professional ranks started in the AMA Supercross 250 East division. While he won his debut professional Supercross race, he would struggle the rest of the Supercross season, either winning or going down trying. He bounced back at Round 5 with his second career win. He finished third in round 6 and won the final round of the Supercross East series for fifth overall. At the season finale Dave Coombs East–West Shootout in Las Vegas, Dungey won by 4.7 seconds over second-place Jake Weimer. Ryan was named 2007 Supercross rookie of the year.

In his first full season of AMA Motocross, Dungey would place 3–3 in Round 1 for his first professional career podium. Showing his consistency, he would place a 4–4 in round 2, 3–3 in round 3 and 5–4 in round 4 and wind up on the podium a total of 4 times. Despite leaving the series due to an injury, he finished fifth for the season.

=== 2008 ===
Dungey was expected to win the 2008 Supercross West title in his second pro season. Throughout the early half, he built a sizeable points lead, but by mid-season his advantage had dwindled and dropped to a two-point deficit behind his rival, Jason Lawrence who took the championship.

=== 2009 ===
In his final year in the 250 class, Dungey dominated the 250 West Supercross while battling Kawasaki’s Christophe Pourcel for the AMA Motocross Championship. The US was not expected to be competitive in the 2009 Motocross des Nations due to James Stewart and Ryan Villopoto both being out with injuries. Dungey, having never raced a 450cc bike, was nominated as team captain and entered the premier MX1 (450) class. In a contest that came down to a battle between the US, French and host Italian teams, Dungey ultimately took first in the final moto and secured the USA’s 20th MXoN victory.

=== 2010 ===
Dungey was predicted to have a modest rookie season in 450 Supercross. James Stewart was the heavy favorite coming off of his second Championship. Dungey started off strong leading most of the first season race until Stewart made a pass with two laps to go. Dungey battled back and almost made a last lap pass. He came back strong with two straight wins in rounds 2 and 3. Dungey went on to win six races that season and become the first rider since Jeremy McGrath to win the Supercross Championship as a rookie.

Dungey had a slow start at Hangtown, the first race of the outdoor Motocross season. At the second round, he bounced back and won both motos. Dungey won 10 out of the final 11 rounds and captured his first AMA Motocross 450 Championship. Through a combined 29 rounds of AMA Supercross and Motocross, he won more than half of the races and became the only rider to capture both the Supercross and Motocross titles in his rookie year. Dungey led the US team to its 21st victory in the 2010 MXoN.

=== 2011 ===
In 2011, Dungey's mentor, Roger De Coster left team Suzuki and the effect on Dungey was obvious. He still came in a respectable third in the Supercross season behind Ryan Villopoto and Chad Reed, but word of a team change began to spread.

Dungey came in to the 2011 outdoor season bearing the number one plate. At the first round, he did battle with both Chad Reed and Ryan Villopoto taking second overall with a 1-2 moto finish to Chads 2-1. Villopoto was third at 3-3. At round 2, he placed a strong second in the first moto only to suffer a bike malfunction and a DNF in moto 2 for an eighth overall. At round 10, Dungey won the first moto but missed the start of moto 2 due to another malfunction of his 450 Suzuki, finally getting onto the track a minute behind the pack. He battled back to a seventh-place finish by the end of the moto, salvaging a third-place finish for the day. He finished the season second only 12 points behind Villopoto. Dungey led the US team to its 22nd and third consecutive victory in the 2011 MXoN.

=== 2012 ===
Dungey joined De Coster at Red Bull KTM factory racing and they built a production bike to his liking for the 2012 AMA Supercross. Dungey took first in four of the Supercross events. He raced round 9 with a cracked collar bone but missed rounds 10 thru 14 after surgery and wound up third for the season.

Dungey put in a stellar performance in the outdoor MX. After placing second to James Stewart in rounds 1 and 2, he finished the season with wins in 19 of the final 20 motos and ten overall wins, earning his second outdoor title in the 450 class with two rounds remaining in the season. It was KTMs first title in the USA.

=== 2013 ===
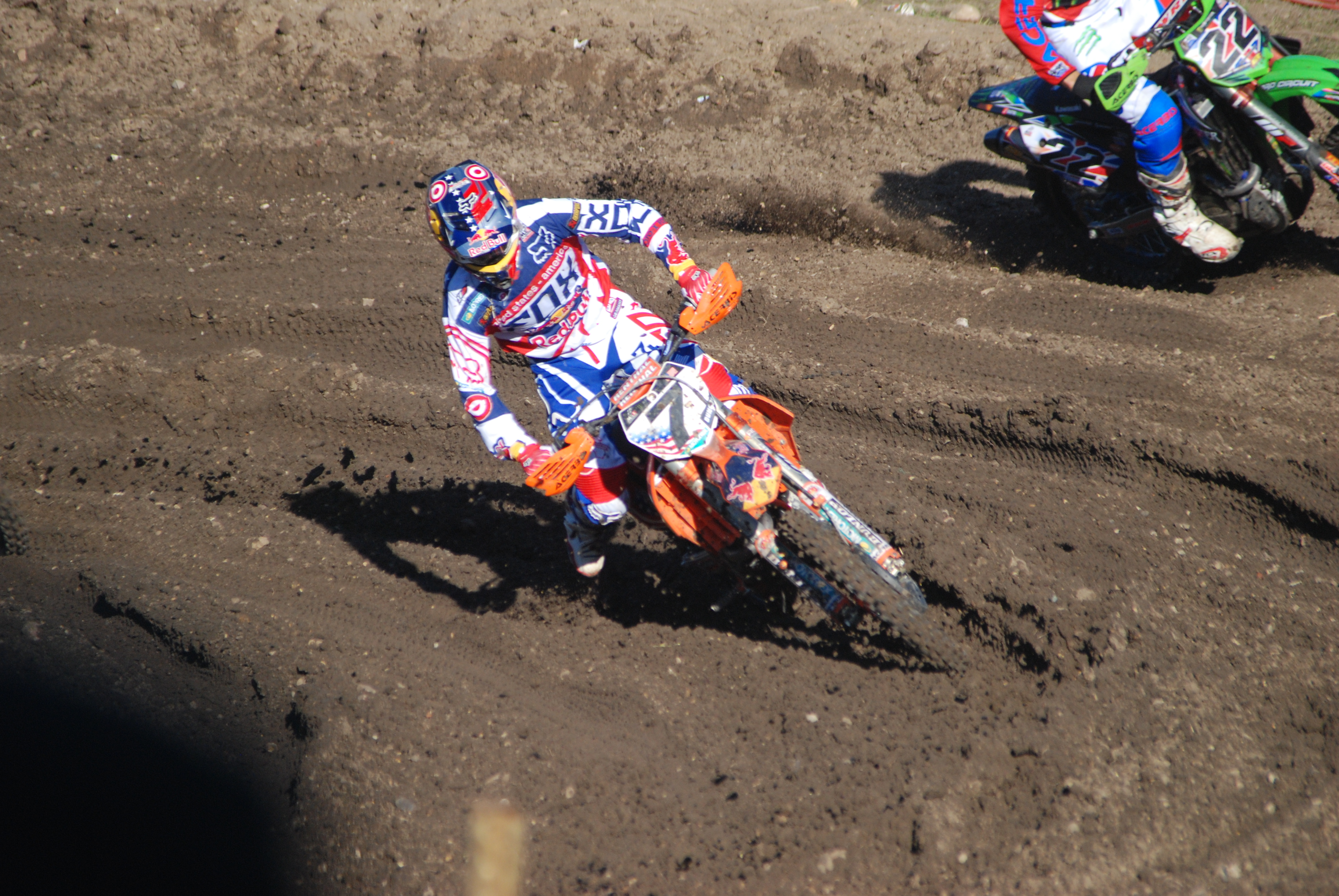
Dungey at the 2013 Motocross Des Nations

Though not his best year, Dungey would stand on the podium in 23 of the season's 29 races foreshadowing the moniker "Diesel" due to the consistency of his performances. He finished third behind Villopoto and Davi Millsaps in Supercross and second behind Villopoto at the outdoors.

=== 2014 ===
Continuing 2014 as the most consistent rider in the class, Dungey wound up on the podium 21 out of 29 times. Round 16 of the 2014 Supercross would be the last time Dungey would finish outside the top-five for the rest of his career. He finishing second to Ryan Villopoto in Supercross and second, 14 points behind Ken Roczen in Motocross.

=== 2015 ===
With newfound energy on the track, Dungey produced stellar results. Fifteen total wins and 21 straight podiums in both the AMA Supercross and Motocross put the No. 1 back on his KTM. After the only fifth-place finish of the year at round 6 of the outdoor, Dungey managed to obtain 21 straight podiums carrying over into the 2016 season.

=== 2016 ===
Dungey would set a record in the 2016 Supercross with 31 consecutive podium finishes over the combined 2015-2016 seasons. He won the Supercross championship.

=== 2017 ===
2017 marked Dungey's most hard-fought battle ever against Eli Tomac. With only three wins on the season to Tomac’s nine, Dungey once again used consistency to take the title. He took the championship at the season finale by five points in one of the best Supercross races of all time. Immediately after taking the title, he announced his retirement.

=== 2022 ===
On the 29th of April, Red Bull KTM Factory racing and Dungey announced a comeback to race rounds 1 & 2 of the 2022 AMA Pro Motocross Championship. He ended up racing the full 12 rounds, where he managed a solid sixth in the overall point standings.

== Achievements ==
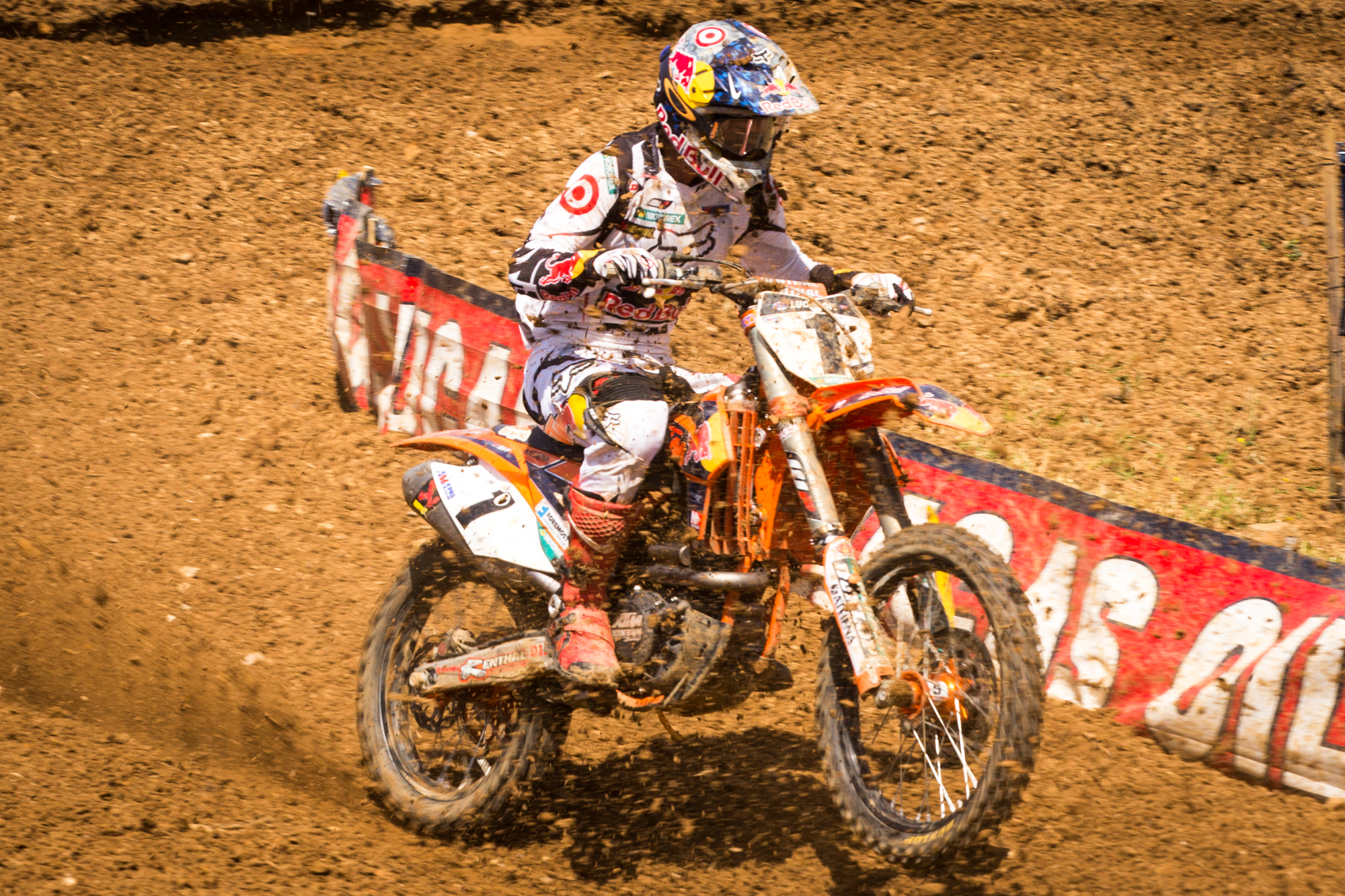
Dungey in 2013 at the Muddy Creek National

=== Statistics ===
Dungey has won every major title in American motocross and supercross. He won the world's largest international motocross race, the Motocross des Nations three times. He has seven major AMA championships. Dungey is tied for sixth place in all-time 450 Supercross race wins (33) and sixth place in all-time Supercross combined wins (44). He holds the record for consecutive podium finishes in Supercross at 31. In all-time 450 motocross overall wins, Dungey is second with 39 to Ricky Carmichael and ahead of Bob Hannah. He is third place in all-time combined (250/450) motocross overall wins (46). Finally, he fourth place in all-time combined Supercross and Motocross wins with 80 total race wins.

== Career AMA Supercross/Motocross results ==
Year	Rnd 1	Rnd 2	Rnd 3	Rnd 4	Rnd 5	Rnd 6	Rnd 7	Rnd 8	Rnd 9	Rnd 10	Rnd 11	Rnd 12	Rnd 13	Rnd 14	Rnd 15	Rnd 16	Rnd 17	Average Finish	Percent Podium	Top 5 Ratio	Place
2008 SX-W	1	2	1	7	11	6	4	-	-	-	-	-	-	-	-	1	1	3.78	56%	6/9	2nd
2008 250 MX	4	2	2	3	11	14	2	2	1	1	2	1	-	-	-	-	-	3.75	75%	10/12	2nd
2009 SX-W	3	1	1	-	2	4	1	-	-	-	-	-	-	-	1	4	2	2.38	78%	9/9	1st
2009 250 MX	1	3	1	2	5	5	1	1	2	3	4	2	-	-	-	-	-	2.50	75%	12/12	1st
2010 450 SX	2	1	1	4	6	4	2	1	2	2	1	2	5	1	4	4	1	2.53	65%	16/17	1st
2010 450 MX	8	1	1	1	1	1	1	1	1	1	6	1	-	-	-	-	-	2.00	83%	10/12	1st
2011 450 SX	2	5	3	3	20	2	2	2	3	4	3	1	3	2	5	3	2	3.88	76%	16/17	3rd
2011 450 MX	2	8	2	3	1	2	1	1	2	3	2	1	-	-	-	-	-	2.33	92%	11/12	2nd
2012 450 SX	3	1	2	4	4	3	2	1	2	DNS	DNS	DNS	DNS	DNS	6	1	1	2.50	75%	11/12	3rd
2012 450 MX	2	2	1	1	1	1	1	1	1	1	1	1	-	-	-	-	-	1.17	100%	12/12	1st
2013 450 SX	3	8	6	3	1	3	3	6	4	2	2	3	2	1	4	3	2	3.12	71%	14/17	3rd
2013 450 MX	2	2	1	2	1	1	10	2	3	3	2	2	-	-	-	-	-	2.58	92%	11/12	2nd
2014 450 SX	2	3	6	4	20	4	2	3	1	3	3	3	9	7	2	6	2	4.71	59%	12/17	2nd
2014 450 MX	1	2	3	4	2	3	1	2	1	1	3	2	-	-	-	-	-	2.08	92%	12/12	2nd
2015 450 SX	4	3	2	2	1	3	1	2	1	1	1	2	1	2	1	2	1	1.76	95%	17/17	1st
2015 450 MX	2	3	1	1	2	5	2	1	1	1	1	1	-	-	-	-	-	1.75	92%	12/12	1st
2016 450 SX	2	1	1	1	2	1	2	1	2	3	3	1	1	1	3	4	1	1.65	95%	17/17	1st
2016 450 MX	2	1	2	out	out	out	out	out	out	out	out	out	-	-	-	-	-	1.67	100%	3/3	17th
2017 450 SX	2	2	1	3	2	4	3	1	2	4	3	3	2	4	2	1	4	2.53	76%	17/17	1st
2022 450 MX	5	7	6	5	7	7	5	12	6	5	6	8	-	-	-	-	-	6.58	0%	4/12	6th

=== Championships ===
- 2009 AMA West Coast SX Lites Champion
- 2009 AMA 250 Motocross Champion
- 2009 Motocross des Nations Champion
- 2010 AMA Supercross 450 Champion (Rookie Season) (Note: Chief rival 2010 Supercross: Ryan Villopoto.)
- 2010 AMA 450 Motocross Champion (Rookie Season)
- 2010 Motocross des Nations Champion (Team USA)
- 2011 Motocross des Nations Champion (Team USA)
- 2012 AMA 450 Motocross Champion (Note: First year with team RedBull KTM.)
- 2015 AMA Supercross 450 Champion
- 2015 AMA 450 Motocross Champion
- 2016 AMA Supercross 450 Champion
- 2017 AMA Supercross 450 Champion (Note: Chief rival 2017 Supercross: Eli Tomac.)

=== Total career AMA wins ===
- 10 in SX Lites Supercross Class
- 7 in 250 Motocross Class 3-2008 4-2009
- 34 in 450 Supercross Class 6-2010 1-2011 4-2012 2-2013 1-2014 8-2015 9-2016 3-2017 (6th all-time)
- 39 in 450 Motocross Class (Note: Second in 450 and overall MX wins to Ricky Carmichael.) 10-2010 4-2011 10-2012 3-2013 4-2014 7-2015 1-2016
- 80 AMA total wins (4th all-time) (Note: Supercross 125/250 Lites class wins are regional and excluded from total wins.) 3-2008 4-2009 16-2010 5-2011 14-2012 5-2013 5-2014 15-2015 10-2016 3-2017

=== Podium finishes ===
- 31 consecutive 2015 and 2016 Supercross (record)
- 54 of 58 2014 MX thru 2016 SX seasons
- From 2009 to 2017 finished only 2 races outside of the top 10

== Other accomplishments ==
- 2015 ESPY Award for Best Male Action Sports Athlete
- 2016 First Motocross Rider on Wheaties Box
- 2016 ESPY Award for Best Male Action Sports Athlete

== Personal life ==
Dungey became a Global Envoy for Livestrong after losing his grandmother to cancer in 2005. After working with Target stores in 2012 and 2013, he organized the MN River-to-River Ride to benefit St. Jude Children's Research Hospital.
