= Aldon Baker =

American motorcycle trainer

Aldon Baker (born 1971 in Pietermaritzburg, South Africa) is a trainer of motorcycle racers.

== Early life ==
Baker was a club level motorcycle roadracer before being inducted into the South African army. He was a two-time winner of the South African XC Championship for mountain biking and represented South Africa in the 1996 World Championships. He was set to compete in the 2000 Sydney Olympics when the South African Olympic Committee eliminated mountain biking from their program. His father was a top marathon runner.

== Career ==
Baker started his career as a personal trainer at a gym in London creating fitness routines and diet regimens drawing on his mountain biking experience. In 2000, Johnny O'Mara was overseeing the training of Ricky Carmichael. O'Mara was acquainted with Baker through Oakley and suggested he might help him. Baker traveled to Florida to meet Carmichael and after a six-month trial took over his training for the 2000 outdoor Motocross season. Baker's success with Carmichael reshaped the landscape for riders and their physical fitness. Initially, he worked with one rider at a time, transitioning from Carmichael after his retirement to James Stewart Jr. In 2014, he took on two champion contenders: Ryan Villopoto and Ken Roczen. At that time, Baker was conducting the training on the property of Villopoto. When Villopoto sold the property, Baker acquired 92 acres and built what came to be called "Baker's Factory". From 2000 to 2020, Baker's riders won 15 out of 21 Supercross championship titles and 14 of 21 outdoor Motocross titles. Some of the titles were not won because of riders being out due to injuries. Riders trained by Baker include: Ricky Carmichael, James Stewart, Ryan Villopoto, Ken Roczen, (Note: These riders continued to race after leaving the Baker program.) Ryan Dungey, Marvin Musquin, Jason Anderson, Zach Osborne, Adam Cianciarulo,Cooper Webb and Malcolm Stewart.

In 2016, Baker entered a five-year deal with factory KTM to work exclusively with riders on KTM and Husqvarna motorcycles.
