= Malcolm Stewart (motorcyclist) =

American motocross rider

- Nationality: American
- Born: Malcolm Jamar Stewart; October 27, 1992 (age 33) Haines City, Florida, U.S.

Motocross career
- Years active: 2011–present
- Teams: •Rockstar Energy Husqvarna Factory Racing (2022-2026)
- Championships: •2016 AMA Supercross 250cc East
- Wins: •AMA Supercross 250cc: 3; •AMA Supercross 450cc: 1

Malcolm Stewart (born October 27, 1992) is an American professional motocross racer who has competed in the AMA Supercross and Motocross championships since 2011. He is the 2016 AMA Supercross 250cc East Champion.

== Career ==
Stewart, just like his older brother James Jr., began racing at a very young age, competing in amateur motocross events. Although his early career was less decorated than his brother's, he showed consistent improvement and developed into a highly competitive rider.

Stewart made his professional debut on February 12, 2011, at Reliant Stadium in Houston, Texas. For the 2011 season, he rode for team ARMA-Suzuki City-Nitro Circus in the 250cc Lites eastern division. His early career was marked by steady progress in both motocross and supercross events. Over the next several seasons, Stewart raced for various teams, gradually establishing himself as a fair contender in the 250cc division. He would sign with GEICO Honda to contest the 2014 and 2015 supercross seasons; for 2014, he raced the 450cc class, competing well with top-tens in 9 of the first 11 rounds, but missing the last five due to complications of dehydration leading to kidney problems.

In 2016, Stewart achieved his first major milestone by winning the AMA 250cc East Supercross Championship with two race wins and six podium finishes. His consistent performances throughout the season, including multiple podium finishes, allowed him to claim the title. This championship marked the highlight of his career in the 250cc class. Stewart sat out the 2016 Lucas Oil Pro Motocross Championship event in order to prepare for the 2017 racing season. After moving to the premier 450cc class full-time in 2017, Stewart initially struggled to find a full-time ride but participated in select events as a privateer. In 2018, he was signed as a fill-in rider for Joe Gibbs Racing Suzuki. Over time, he gained opportunities with factory-supported teams, including Smartop/MotoConcepts Honda and later Rockstar Energy Husqvarna Factory Racing.

In 2022, Stewart joined the Rockstar Energy Husqvarna Factory Racing team for the full AMA Supercross 450cc season. Following this signing, he began to train with Aldon Baker. He began finishing consistently in the top-five and earned three podium finishes. In 2025 at round 5 in Tampa, Stewart earned his first win of his 450cc class career, over 10 years after joining the premier class.

== AMA Supercross/Motocross results ==
Year	Rnd 1	Rnd 2	Rnd 3	Rnd 4	Rnd 5	Rnd 6	Rnd 7	Rnd 8	Rnd 9	Rnd 10	Rnd 11	Rnd 12	Rnd 13	Rnd 14	Rnd 15	Rnd 16	Rnd 17	Average Finish	Podium Percent	Place
2016 250 SX-E	-	-	-	-	-	-	-	2	4	6	1	-	2	8	3	1	3	3.33	67%	1st
2022 450 SX	7	5	5	5	2	4	4	5	8	2	8	4	9	5	4	2	4	4.88	18%	3rd
2024 450 SX	11	22	19	10	11	8	9	7	10	9	11	7	10	9	8	7	6	9.64	0%	10th
2024 450 MX	9	8	8	9	11	6	10	7	9	4	10	-	-	-	-	-	-	8.27	0%	6th
2025 450 SX	10	7	9	10	1	4	9	6	6	2	7	13	4	6	5	4	2	6.17	18%	4th
2025 450 MX	15	10	8	DNF	10	8	6	12	8	7	6	-	-	-	-	-	-	9.00	-	7th
2026 450 SX	DNF ANA (California)	10 SDI (California)	12 ANA (California)	8 HOU (Texas)	DNF GLE (Arizona)	6 SEA (Washington (state))	11 ARL (Texas)	10 DAY (Florida)	7 IND (Indiana)	5 BIR (Alabama)	3 DET (Michigan)	8 STL (Missouri)	18 NAS (Tennessee)	7 CLE (Ohio)	11 PHI (Pennsylvania)	4 DEN (Colorado)	8 SLC (Utah)	8.53	6%	7th
2026 450 MX	17 FOX (California)	OUT HAN (California)	OUT THU (Colorado)	OUT HIG (Pennsylvania)	OUT RED (Michigan)	OUT SOU (Massachusetts)	OUT SPR (Minnesota)	OUT WAS (Washington (state))	20 UNA (New York (state))	13 BUD (Maryland)	16 IRN (Indiana)	-	-	-	-	-	-	16.50	-	27th

== SMX results ==
Year	Rnd 1	Rnd 2	Rnd 3	Average Finish	Podium Percent	Place
2023 450 SMX	OUT CON (North Carolina)	OUT CHI (Illinois)	OUT LAC (California)	-	-	-
2024 450 SMX	7 CON (North Carolina)	13 FOR (Texas)	23 LVE (Nevada)	14.33	-	16th
2025 450 SMX	OUT CON (North Carolina)	OUT STL (Missouri)	OUT LVE (Nevada)	-	-	-
2026 450 SMX	11 COL (Ohio)	8 LOS (California)	9 RID (Missouri)	9.33	-	9th

== Personal life ==
Stewart is the younger brother of James Stewart Jr., a former champion in both supercross and motocross. The brothers are the first in the sport's history to each win a premier class main event.
