= Bryan Johnson (motorcyclist) =

American motorcycle racer (born 1986)

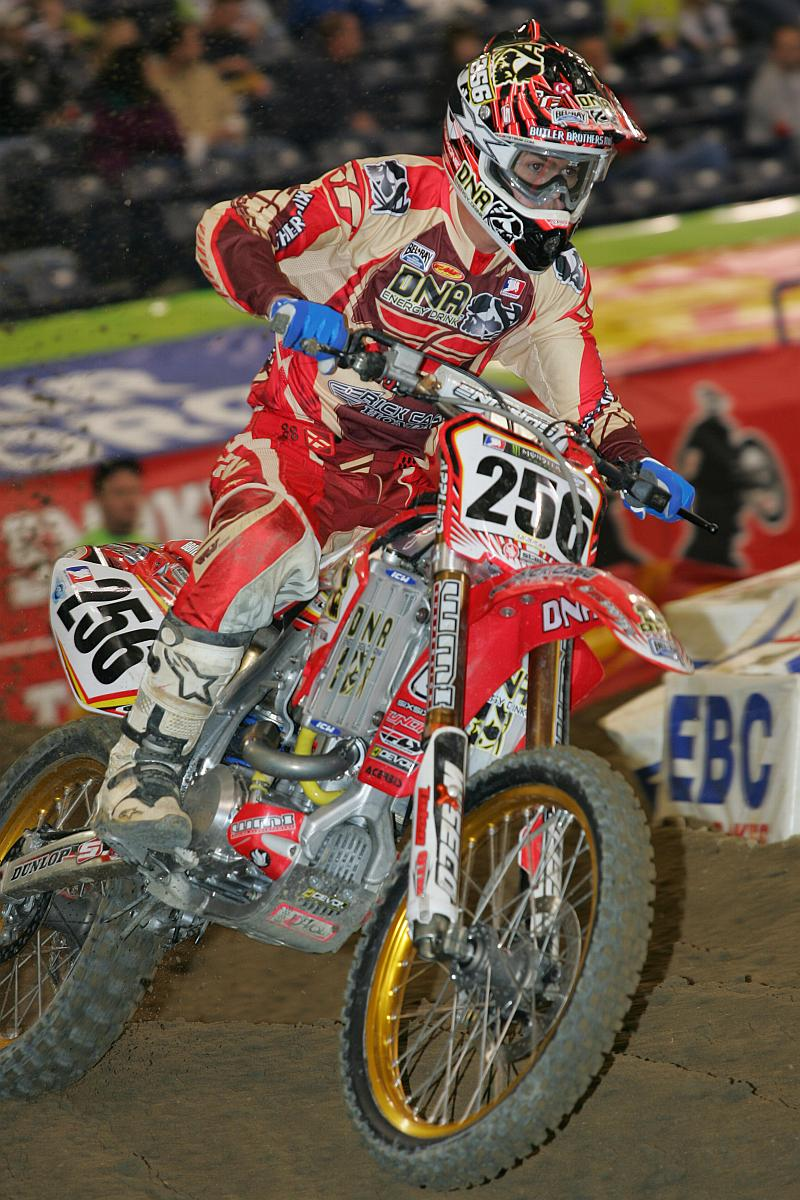
- Johnson in 2008
- Nationality: American
- Born: February 5, 1986 (age 40) Cairo, Georgia

Motocross career
- Years active: 1999 - 2008
- Teams: Yamaha

Bryan Johnson is an American former professional motorcycle racer who raced in the AMA Supercross and Outdoor Motocross championships. He retired after the 2008 supercross season. He is the current head trainer at Millsaps Training Facility (MTF).

== Season results ==
=== Amateur ===
In 1998 Johnson won the Amateur & Youth National Championships in Hurricane Mills, Tennessee.

In 2002, while training for Loretta's 125 A class, Johnson suffered a broken back and neck when a zip tied broken brake cable caused the wheel to lock up. Johnson made a comeback when he won the 2003 Amateur & Youth National Championships in Hurricane Mills, Tennessee for the second time.

=== 2004 ===
Johnson joined Team Yamaha in 2004. Johnson raced supercross and outdoor motocross for Yamaha for three years.

=== 2007 ===
Johnson joined BBMX/BTO Sports for two years.

=== 2008 ===
Johnson suffered a career ending injury when he broke his back training for the 2008 AMA Supercross Championship.

== Personal life ==
Johnson is the step-brother of Davi Millsaps.
