= Tim Ferry =

American motorcycle racer

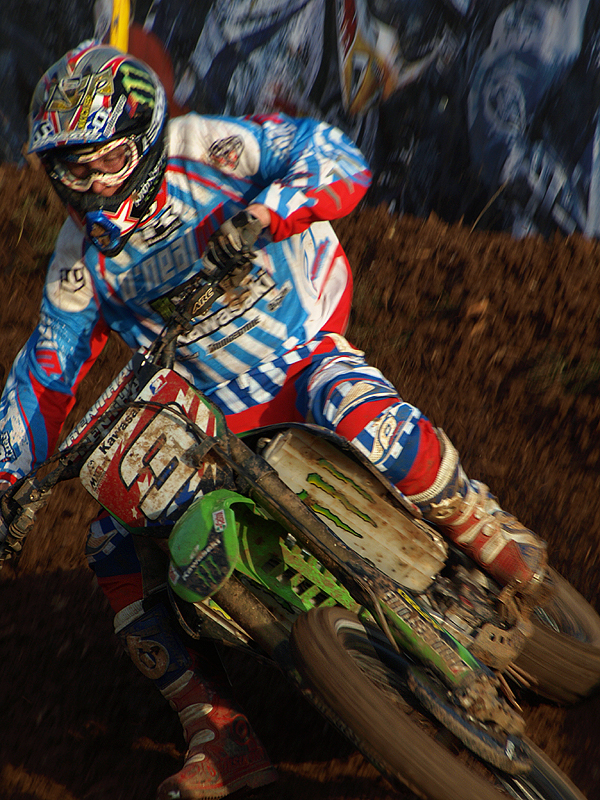
- Tim Ferry (USA, Kawasaki) at Red Bull FIM Motocross of Nations 2008, in Donington Park (England)
- Nationality: American
- Born: March 18, 1975 (age 51) West Palm Beach, Florida

Motocross career
- Years active: 1992–2009
- Teams: Kawasaki; Yamaha; Honda; Suzuki
- Championships: AMA SX East 125cc – 1997
- Wins: 5

Tim Ferry II (born March 18, 1975) is an American former professional motocross and supercross racer. He competed in the AMA Supercross Championships and AMA Motocross Championships for 18 seasons from 1992 to 2009, finishing in the top-five in the season standings a total of ten times. Ferry was a four-time member of the U.S. Motocross des Nations team.

== Motocross racing career ==
Ferry began his amateur career with the Kawasaki factory racing team in the late 1980s and early 1990s. He turned professional in 1992 and won his first 125cc national championship race riding for Suzuki at the 1995 Highpoint Raceway National held in Mt. Morris, Pennsylvania. In 1997, he won the AMA 125 East supercross championship riding for Suzuki.

Ferry moved up to the 250cc class the following year and started riding for Yamaha with the world class mechanic Steve Matthes by his side. In 2001 he started riding on a 426cc four-stroke. He won his first 250 cc Motocross race that same year. In 2007, Ferry won the 450cc Washougal National race and was leading the championship but, faded towards the end of the season and placed fourth in the final standings. He represented the United States at the 2007 Motocross des Nations alongside teammates Ricky Carmichael and Ryan Villopoto as the Americans won the event. Ferry placed second to James Stewart Jr. in the 2008 AMA MX national championship for 450cc motorcycles. He was chosen once again to represent the United States at the 2008 Motocross des Nations, where he and his teammates Stewart and Villopoto repeated as winners of the event. Ferry retired after the 2009 season.

== Overall season results ==
- 1999 - AMA Supercross –10th, AMA Motocross –8th
- 2000 - AMA Supercross –11th, AMA Motocross –10th
- 2001 - AMA Supercross –6th, AMA Motocross –3rd
- 2002 - AMA Supercross –15th, AMA Motocross –2nd
- 2003 - AMA Supercross –5th, AMA Motocross –4th
- 2004 - AMA Supercross –22nd, AMA Motocross –14th
- 2005 - AMA Supercross –12th, AMA Motocross –23rd
- 2006 - AMA Supercross –11th, AMA Motocross –9th
- 2007 - AMA Supercross –3rd, AMA Motocross –4th
- 2008 - AMA Supercross –6th, AMA Motocross –2nd
- 2009 - AMA Supercross –13th, AMA Motocross –20th
