= Heath Voss =

American motorcycle racer

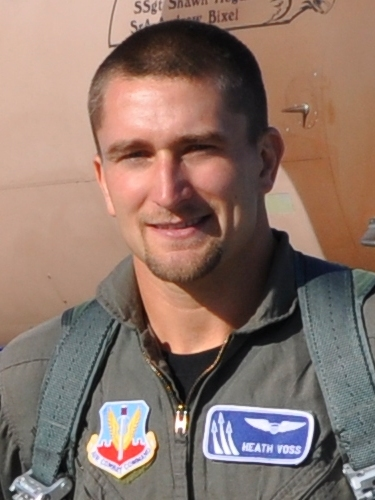
- Voss in 2009
- Nationality: American
- Born: February 17, 1978 (age 48) Prior Lake, Minnesota

Motocross career
- Years active: 1996 - 2010
- Teams: Honda, Yamaha
- Championships: FIM World Supercross - 2004

Heath Voss (born February 17, 1978) is an American former professional motocross racer. He competed in the AMA Motocross Championships from 1996 to 2010. Voss was born in Prior Lake, Minnesota, and is notable for winning the 2004 Fédération Internationale de Motocyclisme Supercross world championship.

After retiring from motocross racing, Voss started a helicopter charter business flying hunters to remote locations.
