= Davi Millsaps =

American motorcycle racer

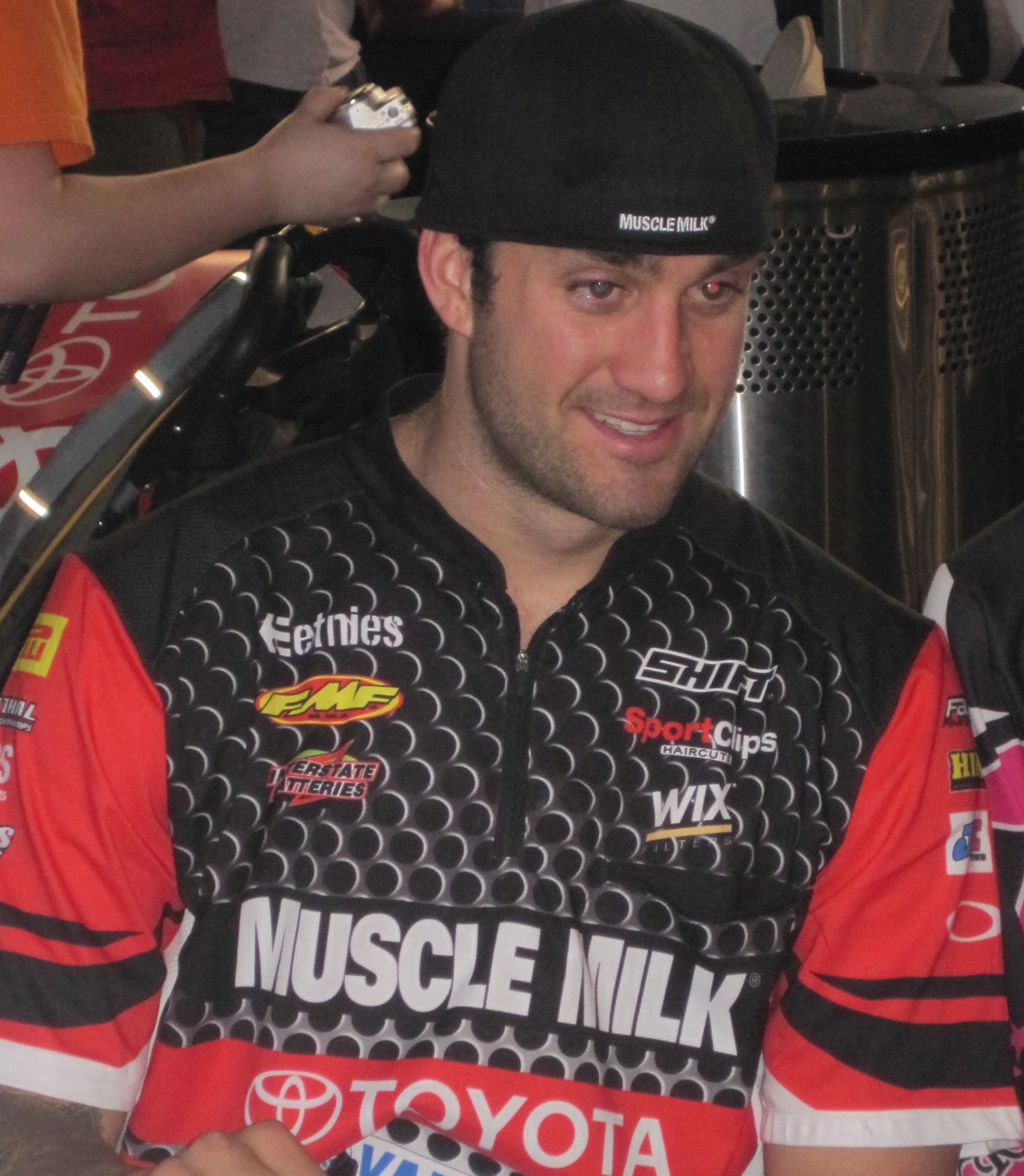
- Davi Millsaps in 2011
- Nationality: American
- Born: February 2, 1988 (age 38) Orlando, Florida, U.S.

Motocross career
- Years active: 2004 - 2017
- Teams: Suzuki, Honda, Kawasaki, Joe Gibbs Racing-Yamaha
- Championships: AMA SX-Lites East - 2006
- Wins: 13

Davi Millsaps (born February 2, 1988) is an American former professional motorcycle racer who raced in the AMA Supercross and Outdoor Motocross championships. A multi-time supercross and motocross champion, he retired before the 2018 supercross season.

Millsaps is tied for 19th place in all-time 450 Supercross race wins and ninth place all-time for 250 Suprecross race wins. He has 13 Supercross combined wins. Millsaps was also a nine-time national Amateur champion.

Born in Orlando, Florida, Millsaps resides in Cairo, Georgia.

== Season results ==
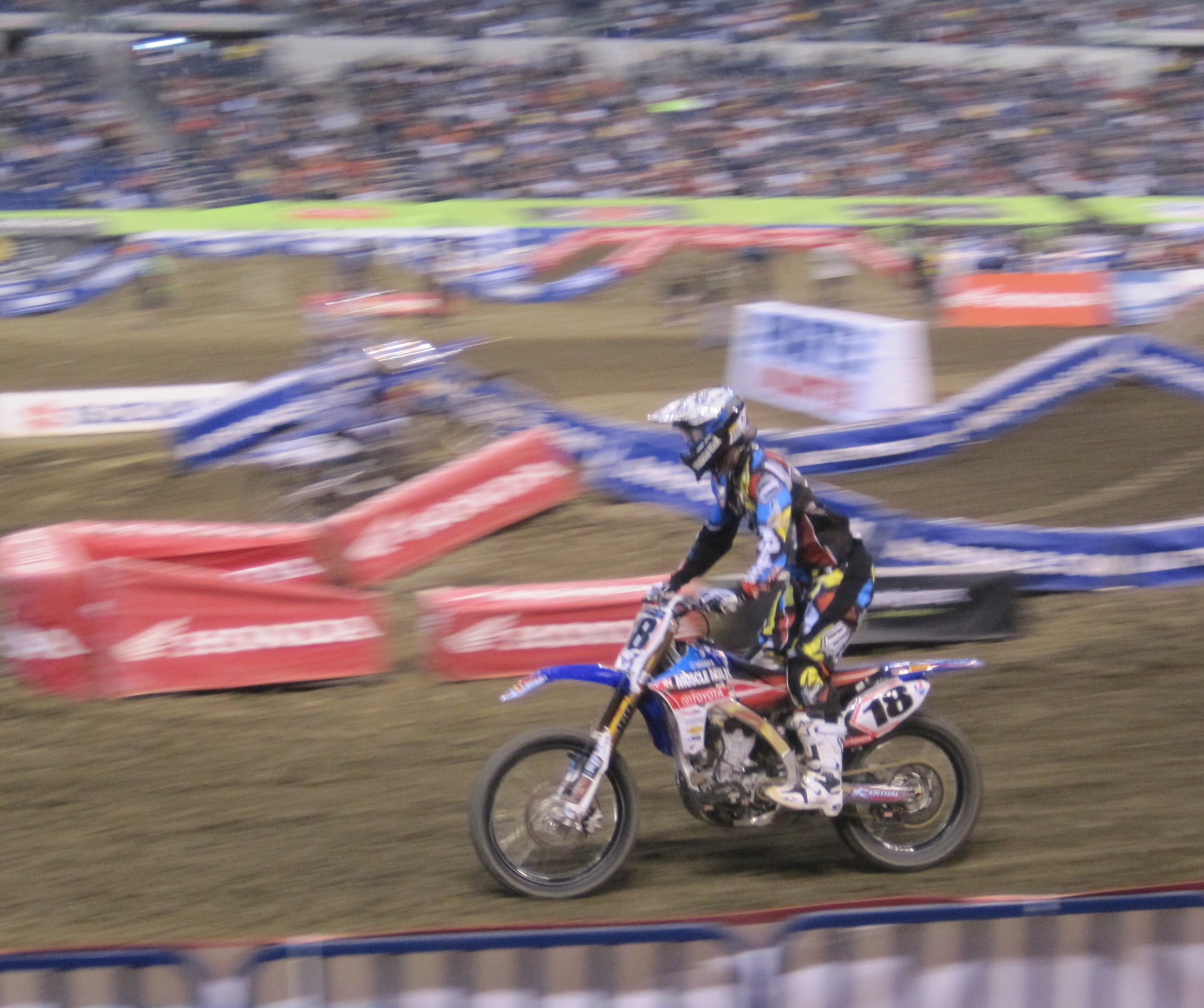
Joe Gibbs Racing Motocross' Davi Millsaps at Lucas Oil Stadium in Indianapolis, Indiana for Monster Energy AMA Supercross. (Round 10 of the 2011 season).

=== 2004 to 2006 ===
2004: 9th (125 2T ESX), 8th (125 2T MX); 2005: 3rd (125 2T ESX), 8th (125 2T MX); 2006: 1st (250 4T ESX), 3rd (250 4T MX)

=== 2006 season ===
In 2006, Millsaps had a breakout year as he won the 2006 AMA East SX Lites Championship.

=== 2007 to 2011 ===
2007: 15th (450 4T SX), 12th (450 4T MX); 2008: 4th (450 4T SX), 11th (450 4T MX); 2009: 8th (450 4T SX), 11th (450 4T MX); 2010: 3rd (450 4T SX), 19th (450 4T MX); 2011: 8th (450 4T SX), 10th (450 4T MX)

=== 2012 season ===
Millsaps took second place overall – 450 Supercross Championship.

=== 2013 season ===
Millsaps took second to Ryan Villopoto in 450 4T SX.

=== 2014 season ===
Millsaps won the Monster Energy Cup.

=== 2015 season ===
Millsaps took fifth place in the Monster Energy Cup.

=== 2016 season ===
450 4T champion of Canadian MX Nationals.

== Career AMA Supercross/Motocross results ==
Year	Rnd 1	Rnd 2	Rnd 3	Rnd 4	Rnd 5	Rnd 6	Rnd 7	Rnd 8	Rnd 9	Rnd 10	Rnd 11	Rnd 12	Rnd 13	Rnd 14	Rnd 15	Rnd 16	Rnd 17	Average Finish	Podium Percent	Place
2012 450 SX	16	13	6	7	7	7	15	4	6	2	3	4	2	6	5	2	2	6.29	29%	2nd
2013 450 SX	1	3	4	2	2	1	2	3	6	10	4	2	5	3	3	2	3	3.29	71%	2nd

== Personal life ==
Millsaps is the step-brother of Bryan Johnson.
