= James Stewart Jr. =

American motorcycle racer

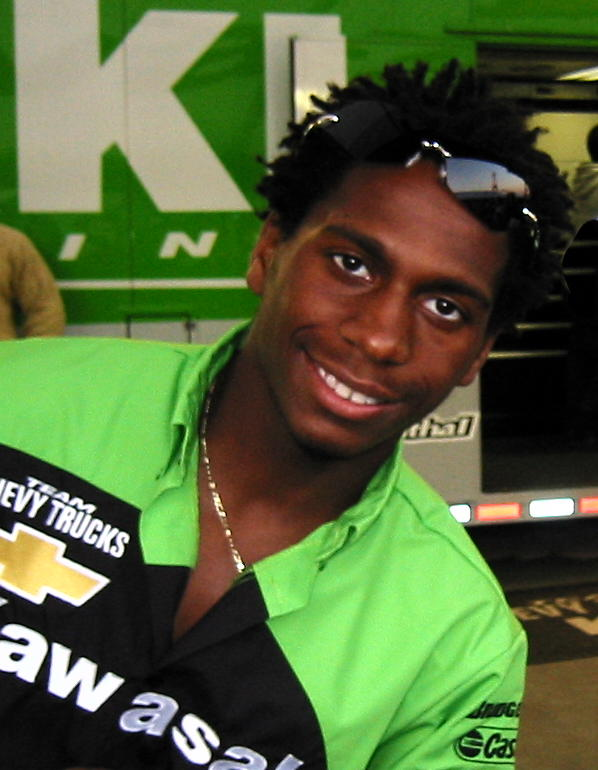
- Stewart in 2004

Personal information
- Nickname: Bubba
- Born: December 21, 1985 (age 40) Bartow, Florida, U.S.

Sport
- Sport: Motocross, Supercross
- Retired: May 17, 2019

Achievements and titles
- World finals: 2006 FIM World Supercross Grand Prix Champion; 2007 FIM World Supercross Grand Prix Champion; 2006 Motocross of Nations Champion; 2008 Motocross of Nations Champion; 2009 FIM World Supercross Champion
- Regional finals: 2003 AMA 125 West Supercross Champion; 2004 AMA 125 East Supercross Champion
- National finals: 2002 AMA 125 Motocross National Champion; 2004 AMA 125 Motocross National Champion; 2007 AMA Supercross Champion; 2008 AMA Motocross National Champion; 2009 AMA Supercross Champion

James Stewart Jr. (born December 21, 1985) is an American former professional motocross and supercross racer, widely regarded as one of the most talented and dynamic riders in the history of the sport. Known for his raw speed and innovative riding techniques, Stewart earned two AMA Supercross 450cc championships, one AMA Motocross 450cc championship, & two 125cc AMA Supercross titles. He is 6th in all-time 250cc supercross west class wins, 3rd in all-time supercross 450cc class wins, and 1st in all-time 125cc wins, placing him among the most successful riders of all time.

Nicknamed "Bubba," Stewart revolutionized motocross with his aggressive riding style and groundbreaking "scrub" technique, which allowed him to clear jumps faster and with more precision than his competitors. This innovation not only changed how the sport was raced but also became a signature move emulated by racers worldwide. His contributions to the sport earned him the moniker "The Fastest Man on the Planet."

Stewart's influence extended beyond the track, becoming the first African American rider to dominate motocross and supercross at the highest levels. His success and charisma helped expand the sport's appeal to a broader audience. He also starred in his own reality television series, Bubba’s World, which showcased his life and career, along with several video games such as James Stewart’s Motocross.

Since discontinuing racing in 2016 and formally retiring from professional racing in 2019, Stewart remained relatively quiet in the industry, until returning to the sport as an on-camera commentator for the AMA Motocross and Supercross championships in 2022.

== Career ==
James Stewart Jr. was born on December 21, 1985, in Bartow, Florida, and began racing motocross under the guidance of his father at the age of four. During his amateur career, Stewart achieved significant success, securing 84 race victories and 11 Loretta Lynn's Amateur National Championship titles between 1990 and 2001.

Stewart turned professional in 2002, joining Kawasaki and competing in the 125cc class of the AMA Western Regional Supercross Championship. Stewart earned his first professional victory at round 2 of the series and would stay competitive through the entire series, coming short of the title by only seven points. In the 2002 AMA Motocross season, he demonstrated a commanding performance in the 125cc class, winning his debut race of the series at Glen Helen Raceway and securing the title after winning 10 of the series' 12 rounds. In 2004, he transitioned to the AMA 125cc West Supercross series, securing another championship and further cementing his dominance in the class. Following this, he introduced the "scrub" technique, an innovation that minimized airtime over jumps and became a foundational skill for riders at the elite level.

In 2005, Stewart moved to the premier 450cc class with Kawasaki. The transitional year brought Stewart his first Supercross premier class win in Texas in round 12, but also inconsistency due to crashes and injuries. Despite these challenges, he would finish the series tenth in point standings.

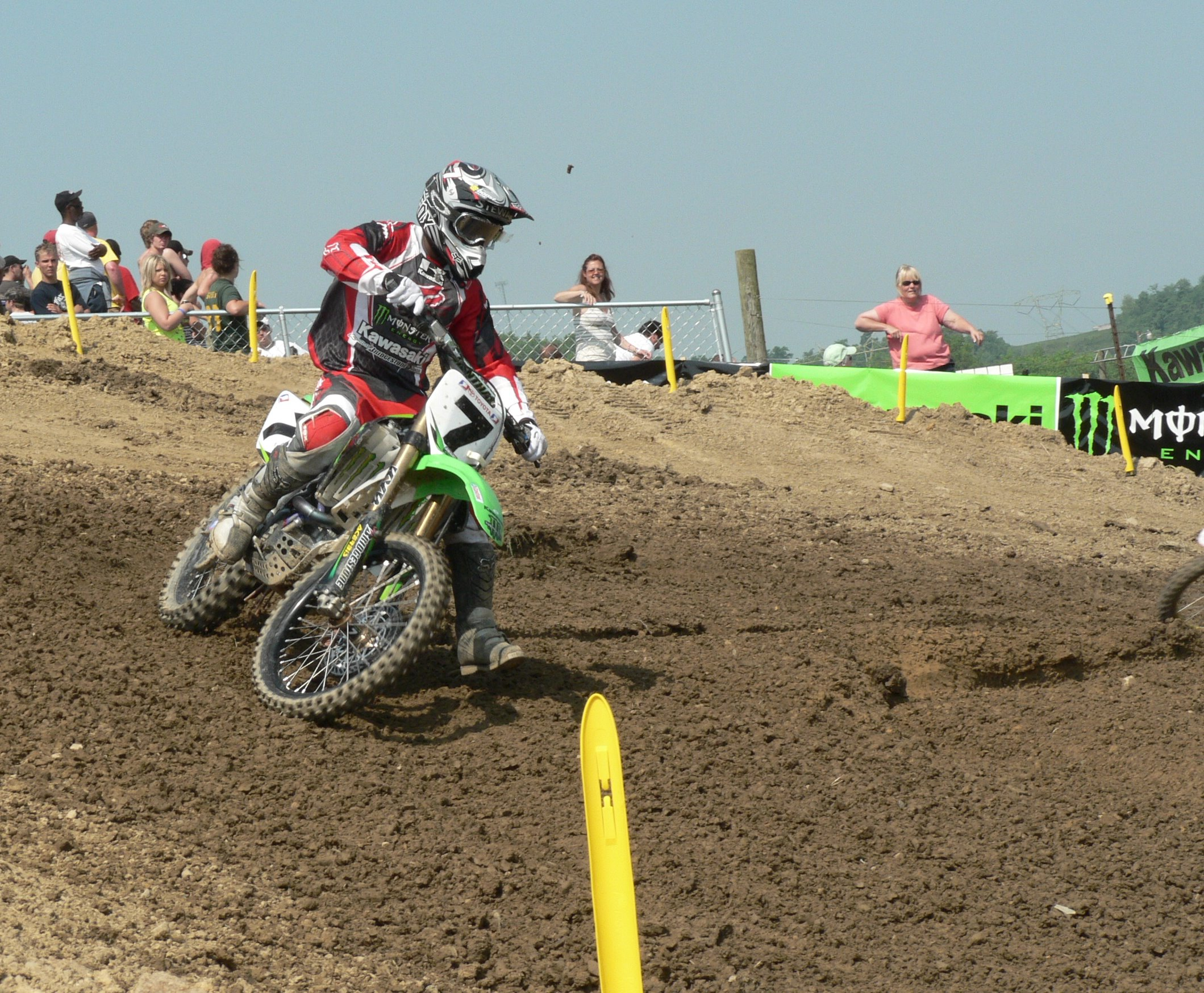
Stewart in 2007

The 2006 and 2007 seasons saw Stewart achieve significant milestones. He won several rounds in the AMA Supercross series, finishing second overall behind Ricky Carmichael. Later that year, he represented Team USA at the Motocross des Nations in Matterley Basin, England, alongside Ryan Villopoto and Ivan Tedesco. The team secured victory, with Stewart contributing strong performances in his motos. Stewart claimed his first AMA Supercross Championship in 2007, winning 13 of 16 races during the season. This achievement made him the first African American to win a major motocross or supercross title. However, injuries forced him to miss the outdoor motocross season.

In 2008, after missing the entirety of the supercross season due to a torn ACL, Stewart achieved one of the rarest accomplishments in motocross history: a perfect season in the AMA Pro Motocross Championship. After recruiting Aldon Baker to help him heal from the injury, he would go on to win all 24 motos in the 450cc class, joining Ricky Carmichael as the only riders to complete such a feat. He also represented Team USA again at the Motocross des Nations, held at Donington Park in England, contributing to another team victory.

The 2009 season saw Stewart claim his second AMA Supercross Championship. Over the course of the season, he engaged in intense battles with close rival Chad Reed, ultimately landing four points ahead of Reed and winning 11 of 17 rounds to secure the title. This season in particular is remembered for the intensely competitive rivalry between Stewart and Reed.

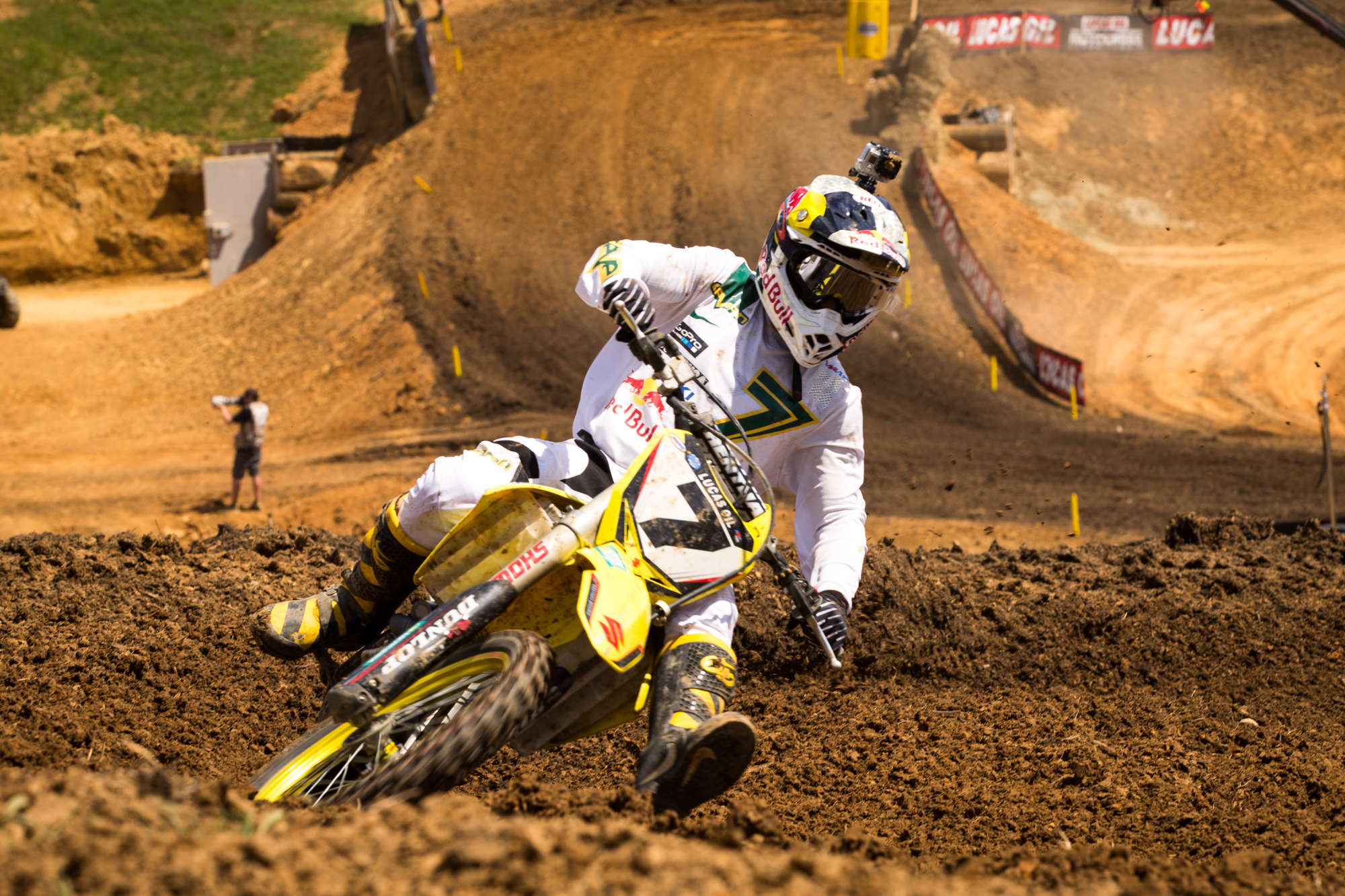
James Stewart in 2013

From 2010 onward, Stewart's career was marked by intermittent success. He delivered strong performances, including race wins, but struggled with the new Yamaha bike he had been assigned to ride in 2012, eventually leading to his departure from Joe Gibbs Racing after only one year. One day after announcing his split from JGRMX and Yamaha, Stewart signed to ride with Yoshimura Suzuki aboard their RMZ-450. In 2013, he won multiple rounds in both supercross and motocross, though injuries continued to impact his results. In 2015, Stewart was suspended for 16 months for failing an anti-doping test after failing to submit the proper paperwork for a Therapeutic Use Exemption (TUE) for medically prescribed Adderall. As a result, he missed the entire 2015 season. Upon his return, Stewart competed sporadically but was unable to recapture his previous dominance due to ongoing injuries and the increasingly competitive field. His final race would be on July 23, 2016, in Washougal, Washington, finishing 15th overall.

On May 17, 2019, Stewart announced his retirement in a video posted to YouTube. "Where I'm at in my life, I think it's time to say I'm retiring. I've retired," he said in part. "It's hard for sure, because I love racing and I love the fans, I love the opening ceremonies, I love the autograph lines, but I don't miss the sweat and tears and training and having to feel like you have to win every race and having to be James Stewart. I don't love doing that anymore."

Since the 2023 season, Stewart embarked as a regular commentator and analyst for the AMA SuperMotocross World Championship.

=== Other racing pursuits ===
Stewart made his X Games debut on July 30, 2009, at X Games XV, and placed second in the best whip competition with 21% of the votes, winning his first X Games medal. He suffered a deep bruise to his bone and muscle in his left shoulder during seeding trials for SuperMoto on July 31, forcing him to drop out of the games.

In October 2011, Stewart signed to race for Joe Gibbs Racing, with a multiyear contract to run for JGRMX in motocross as well as plans to run NASCAR stock car races in the K&N Pro Series East and Nationwide Series. At the end of the 2012 supercross season, Stewart left Joe Gibbs Racing and JGRMX. Stewart said that he would be open to racing with Gibbs in the future but stated that he wanted to get back to being competitive in motorcycle racing, and that a change was necessary.

=== Other business ventures ===
On March 28, 2010, Stewart's reality show Bubba's World debuted and ran 10 episodes on Fuel TV. The second season started in December, offered 13 episodes and concluded on February 24, 2011. There has been no announcement about a third season. In 2022, the Bubba's World title transitioned from documenting the day-to-day life of Stewart into a podcast format discussing current events within motocross and supercross racing.

== Career results ==
=== AMA Motocross and Supercross ===
Year	Rnd 1	Rnd 2	Rnd 3	Rnd 4	Rnd 5	Rnd 6	Rnd 7	Rnd 8	Rnd 9	Rnd 10	Rnd 11	Rnd 12	Rnd 13	Rnd 14	Rnd 15	Rnd 16	Rnd 17	Average Finish	Podium Percent	Place
2002 SX-W	2	1	2	1	11	-	-	-	-	-	10	-	-	16	1	1	-	5.00	67%	2nd
2002 125 MX	1	1	12	6	1	1	1	1	1	1	1	1	-	-	-	-	-	2.33	83%	1st
2003 SX-W	2	1	1	1	1	1	-	-	-	-	-	-	-	1	1	21	-	3.33	89%	1st
2003 125 MX	OUT	OUT	OUT	OUT	1	1	1	1	1	1	1	-	-	-	-	-	-	1.00	100%	3rd
2004 SX-E	-	-	-	-	-	-	1	1	1	1	1	OUT	1	-	-	1	-	1.00	100%	1st
2004 125 MX	1	1	1	1	7	1	1	1	1	1	1	1	-	-	-	-	-	1.50	92%	1st
2005 250 SX	5	OUT	OUT	OUT	OUT	OUT	OUT	OUT	OUT	OUT	3	1	4	1	1	OUT	-	2.50	67%	10th
2005 250 MX	12	2	38	3	3	37	OUT	OUT	OUT	11	OUT	OUT	-	-	-	-	-	15.10	43%	10th
2006 450 SX	1	3	3	1	8	1	17	3	2	6	1	1	1	2	1	1	-	3.25	81%	2nd
2006 450 MX	1	39	4	OUT	2	40	3	1	4	2	2	1	-	-	-	-	-	9.00	64%	4th
2007 450 SX	1	1	1	2	1	1	5	1	2	1	1	1	1	1	1	1	-	1.38	94%	1st
2007 450 MX	2	2	2	2	2	OUT	1	8	OUT	OUT	OUT	OUT	-	-	-	-	-	2.71	86%	7th
2008 450 SX	2	1	OUT	OUT	OUT	OUT	OUT	OUT	OUT	OUT	OUT	OUT	OUT	OUT	OUT	OUT	OUT	1.50	100%	23rd
2008 450 MX	1	1	1	1	1	1	1	1	1	1	1	1	-	-	-	-	-	1.00	100%	1st
2009 450 SX	19	1	1	1	1	1	1	1	2	7	1	2	1	1	2	1	3	2.70	88%	1st
2009 450 MX	OUT	OUT	OUT	OUT	OUT	OUT	OUT	OUT	OUT	OUT	OUT	OUT	-	-	-	-	-	OUT	OUT	OUT
2010 450 SX	1	15	3	OUT	OUT	OUT	OUT	OUT	OUT	OUT	OUT	OUT	OUT	OUT	OUT	OUT	OUT	6.33	67%	20th
2010 450 MX	OUT	OUT	OUT	OUT	OUT	OUT	OUT	OUT	11	OUT	OUT	OUT	-	-	-	-	-	11.00	0%	35th
2011 450 SX	3	1	2	1	1	15	3	4	9	2	18	4	4	1	1	10	15	5.52	53%	4th
2011 450 MX	OUT	OUT	OUT	OUT	OUT	OUT	OUT	OUT	OUT	OUT	OUT	OUT	-	-	-	-	-	OUT	OUT	OUT
2012 450 SX	6	8	3	1	2	15	6	3	5	1	OUT	OUT	20	OUT	OUT	OUT	OUT	6.36	45%	7th
2012 450 MX	1	1	40	13	OUT	3	OUT	OUT	OUT	15	OUT	OUT	-	-	-	-	-	12.16	50%	12th
2013 450 SX	8	7	12	19	4	4	20	1	2	8	3	7	19	18	OUT	OUT	OUT	9.64	21%	10th
2013 450 MX	3	7	4	19	12	10	2	3	1	11	40	OUT	-	-	-	-	-	10.18	36%	5th
2014 450 SX	17	4	2	2	7	1	1	11	7	18	1	1	1	5	2	22	22	7.29	47%	4th
2014 450 MX	6	4	2	1	8	13	16	OUT	OUT	OUT	OUT	OUT	OUT	OUT	OUT	OUT	OUT	7.14	28%	9th
2016 450 MX	40	OUT	OUT	OUT	OUT	OUT	OUT	15	15	OUT	OUT	OUT	-	-	-	-	-	23.33	0%	31st

- 28 wins in 125/250 AMA Motocross 10-2002 7-2003 11–2004
- 18 wins in 125/250 AMA Supercross
- 50 wins in 450 AMA Supercross 3-2005 8-2006 13-2007 1-2008 11-2009 1-2010 5-2011 2-2012 1-2013 5–2014
- 20 wins in 250/450 AMA Motocross 3-2006 1-2007 12-2008 2-2012 1-2013 1–2014
- 116 total AMA wins 10-2002 7-2003 11-2004 3-2005 11-2006 14-2007 13-2008 11-2009 1-2010 5-2011 4-2012 2-2013 5–2014

== Awards ==
Stewart won 2002 AMA Rookie of the Year.

Stewart was also named one of "20 Teens Who Will Change the World" in the April 2003 issue of Teen People magazine.

In 2022, Stewart was inducted into the AMA Motorcycle Hall of Fame.

== Personal life ==
Stewart's younger brother is fellow motocross racer Malcolm Stewart.

On March 28, 2011, Stewart was arrested for impersonating a police officer, after attempting to stop another vehicle containing two off-duty highway-patrol troopers using red and blue police-style flashing lights. Stewart pled "no contest" and was sentenced to 75 hours of community service.
