= Ryan Villopoto =

American motorcycle racer (born 1988)

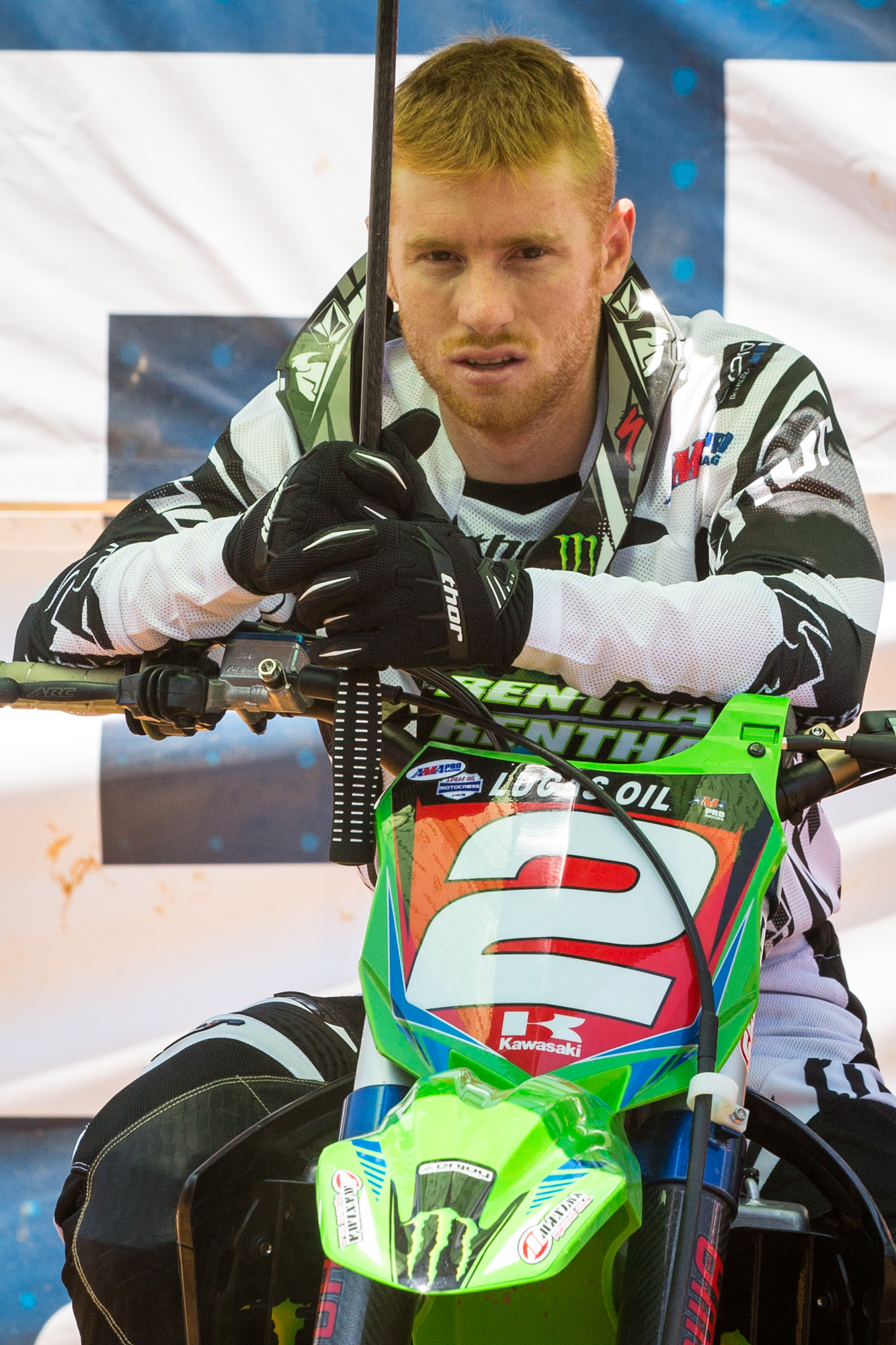
- RV in 2013
- Nationality: (United States) American
- Born: August 13, 1988 (age 38) Fortuna, California, U.S.

Motocross career
- Years active: 2005–2015
- Teams: •Monster Energy/ Pro Circuit Kawasaki (2005-2015)
- Championships: •2006 AMA Motocross 250cc; •2007 AMA Supercross 250cc West; •2007 AMA Motocross 250cc; •2008 AMA Motocross 250cc; •2011 AMA Supercross 450cc; •2011 AMA Motocross 450cc; •2012 AMA Supercross 450cc; •2013 AMA Supercross 450cc; •2013 AMA Motocross 450cc; •2014 AMA Supercross 450cc
- Wins: •AMA 250cc Supercross: 11; •AMA 250cc Motocross: 19; •AMA 450cc Supercross: 41; •AMA 450cc Motocross: 12; •AMA Total: 83

Ryan Daniel Villopoto (born August 13, 1988, in Fortuna, California) is an American former professional motocross and supercross racer who competed in the AMA Motocross Championships from 2005 to 2014; a four-time 450cc AMA Supercross Champion, a two-time 450cc AMA Motocross Champion, a three-time 250cc AMA Motocross Champion & a one-time 250cc West Supercross Champion. He was also a member of the winning USA team at the 2006, 2007, 2008, and 2011 Motocross Des Nations.

Villopoto raced his entire career for the Kawasaki factory racing team in the supercross and outdoor motocross series. His retirement from supercross was announced on January 3, 2015, on the opening day of the 2015 Monster Energy Supercross season. His trainer was Aldon Baker.

== AMA Supercross/Motocross career ==
=== Supercross ===
==== 2010 ====
While leading the Main of Round 14 at St. Louis, Villopoto came up short on a triple jump and leaped from his bike, landing hard. His bike dove into the face of the third jump and flipped over several times. Medical workers arrived on the scene and cut the racing boot off his foot. Villopoto had to be carried off the track. Further examination revealed a broken right tibia and fibula and surgery was performed to stabilize it. He withdrew from the 2010 series after his Round 14 injury with 266 championship points, leaving him in fourth place by the season's end.

==== 2011 ====
Villopoto won his first Monster Energy AMA Supercross Championship, edging out Chad Reed by four points in the 17-race championship. Villopoto won a series-high six races throughout the season.

Later, Villopoto won the inaugural Monster Energy Cup, claiming wins in the three heats to grab a US$1 million purse.

Villopoto finished 2011 leading Ryan Dungey by 12 points to claim the Lucas Oil Pro Motocross Championship.

==== 2012 ====
Villopoto won his second AMA Supercross Championship, capturing the title with four rounds remaining in the season. He won 9 of 16 rounds of racing.

==== 2013 ====
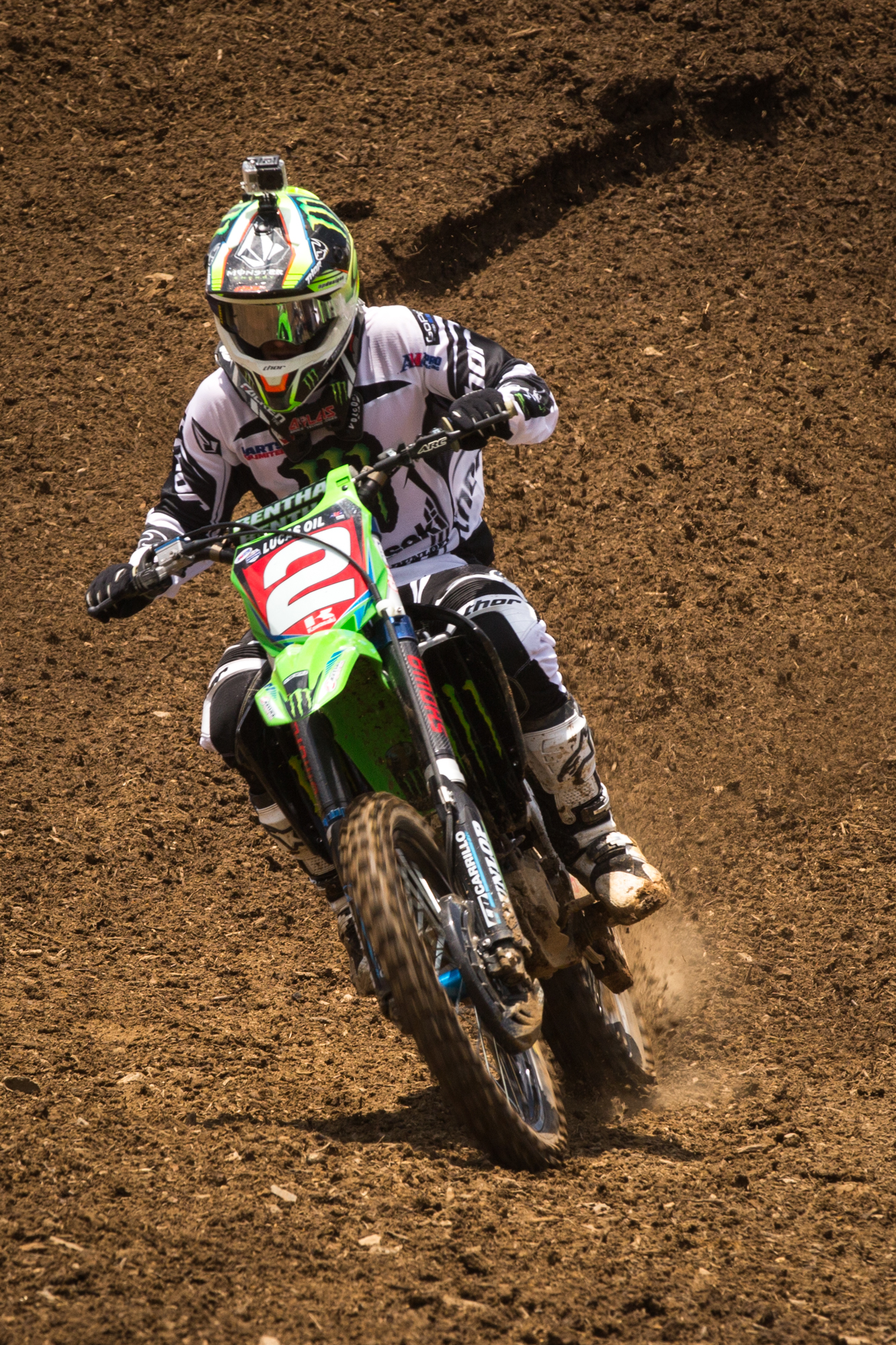
Villopoto in 2013

Villopoto won the 2013 Monster Energy AMA Supercross Championship. It was Villopoto's third straight AMA Supercross Series championship, putting him in an elite class of off-road motorcycle champions – only Bob Hannah, Jeremy McGrath, and Ricky Carmichael have won three straight SX titles (Hannah ’77 – ’79, McGrath ”93 – ’96, ’98 – 2000, Carmichael ’01 – ’03).

Villopoto would also go on to win the Lucas Oil Pro Motocross Championship.

==== 2014 ====
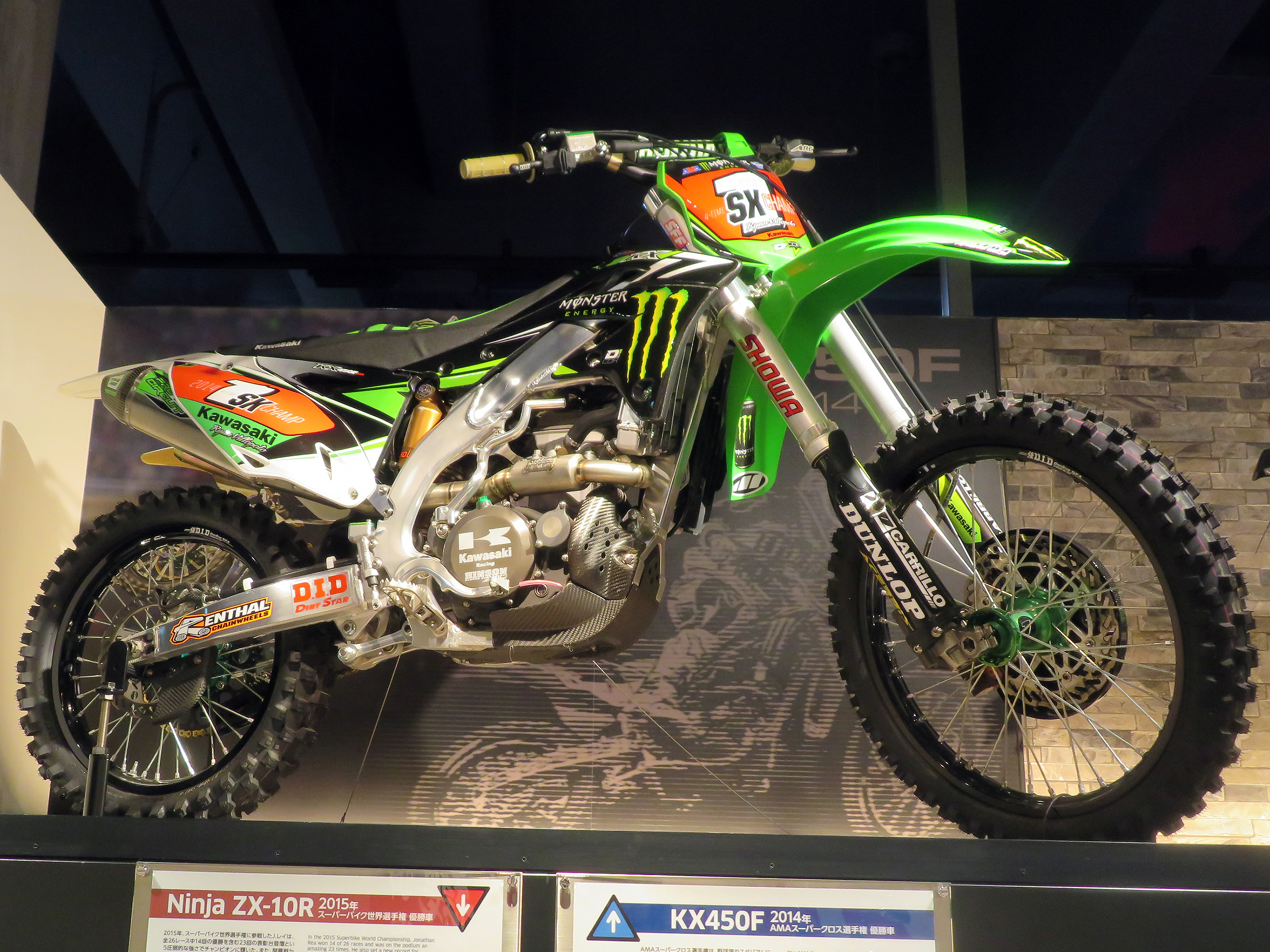
Villipoto’s 2014 Championship bike

Villipoto wrapped up his fourth straight Monster Energy Supercross championship with one round remaining in the 2014 series.

On March 8, 2014, Villopoto won the 450cc Final at Daytona International Speedway. It was his fourth career win at Daytona, moving him within one win of Ricky Carmichael's all-time record of five Daytona wins. He had previously won races in Phoenix and Oakland during the Supercross season. On April 5, 2014, Villopoto won the 450cc Main Event at Houston's Reliant Stadium, bringing his total career Supercross All-Time Wins number to 38, making him fifth place overall behind Chad Reed. On April 26, 2014, Villopoto dominated the highly competitive Supercross race at round 16 in New York, Metlife stadium, collecting his sixth win of the season (40th of career).

==== 2015 ====
Villopoto chose to compete in the FIM Motocross World Championship placing first at the second race of the series in Thailand, but withdrew from the series after discovering that the injuries sustained from a crash in the Trentino GP were worse than initially realized. In July, Villopoto announced his retirement on his official website.

== Motocross des Nations participation ==
=== 2006 ===
At the age of 18 and his Des nations debut, Villopoto went 3-2 to win the MX2 class and secure his first victory at this event.

=== 2007 ===
Villopoto dominated the field at the 2007 Mxon which was held at Budd’s Creek, USA. A 1-1 score led him to the MX2 class overall and a successful defence of the Chamberlin trophy.

=== 2008 ===
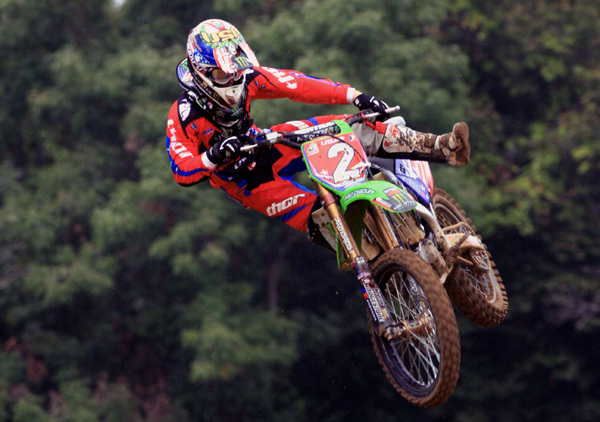
Villopoto at the 2008 MXON in Donington Park, England

Villopoto went 1-10 to win the MX2 class as well as his third consecutive Motocross of nations.

=== 2011 ===
After a two-year absence from this event due to injury, Villopoto went 3-1 to win the open class and extend team USA’s win streak to seven.

== Career results ==
=== Career AMA Supercross/Motocross results ===
Year	Rnd 1	Rnd 2	Rnd 3	Rnd 4	Rnd 5	Rnd 6	Rnd 7	Rnd 8	Rnd 9	Rnd 10	Rnd 11	Rnd 12	Rnd 13	Rnd 14	Rnd 15	Rnd 16	Rnd 17	Average Finish	Podium Percent	Place
2006 250 MX	5	1	12	1	1	1	1	6	4	2	2	1	-	-	-	-	-	3.08	67%	1st
~2007 250 SX-W	1	2	1	1	1	1	1	-	-	-	-	-	-	-	1	21	-	3.33	89%	1st
2007 250 MX	2	2	2	1	1	7	2	2	1	1	1	2	-	-	-	-	-	2.00	92%	1st
2008 250 SX-E	-	-	-	-	-	-	-	22	2	2	1	-	1	1	4	-	2	3.88	75%	2nd
2008 250 MX	2	1	1	1	1	1	1	1	2	2	1	20	-	-	-	-	-	2.83	92%	1st
2009 450 SX	5	7	4	3	3	OUT	4	3	9	6	9	OUT	OUT	OUT	1	4	1	4.53	38%	6th
2009 450 MX	1	21	OUT	OUT	OUT	OUT	OUT	OUT	OUT	OUT	OUT	OUT	-	-	-	-	-	11.00	50%	24th
2010 450 SX	5	2	7	1	4	1	1	19	1	1	4	1	1	20	OUT	OUT	OUT	4.85	57%	4th
2010 450 MX	OUT	OUT	OUT	OUT	OUT	OUT	OUT	OUT	OUT	OUT	OUT	OUT	-	-	-	-	-	OUT	OUT	OUT
2011 450 SX	1	2	1	4	2	3	7	1	1	1	OUT	9	2	3	4	1	3	2.62	75%	1st
2011 450 MX	3	3	1	2	2	3	2	2	1	2	1	2	-	-	-	-	-	2.00	100%	1st
2012 450 SX	1	3	4	3	1	1	1	2	1	5	1	1	1	1	19	OUT	OUT	3.00	86%	1st
2012 450 MX	OUT	OUT	OUT	OUT	OUT	OUT	OUT	OUT	OUT	OUT	OUT	OUT	-	-	-	-	-	OUT	OUT	OUT
2013 450 SX	16	2	1	1	8	6	1	2	1	1	1	1	1	2	2	1	1	2.82	82%	1st
2013 450 MX	1	1	3	1	2	2	1	1	5	1	1	1	-	-	-	-	-	1.67	92%	1st
2014 450 SX	4	1	5	1	3	2	4	2	4	1	2	6	2	1	1	1	1	2.41	71%	1st

Championships

- 2006 MX Lites Champion
- 2007 AMA West SX Lites Champion
- 2007 MX Lites Champion
- 2008 MX Lites Champion
- 2011 AMA Supercross 450 Champion
- 2011 AMA 450 Motocross Champion
- 2011 Monster Energy cup winner(1-1-1)
- 2012 AMA Supercross 450 Champion
- 2013 AMA Supercross 450 Champion
- 2013 AMA 450 Motocross Champion
- 2014 AMA Supercross 450 Champion

Total Career AMA Wins

- 11 Wins in 125/250 AMA Supercross (Regional): 1–2006 7–2007 3–2008
- 20 Wins in 125/250 AMA Motocross: 6–2006 5–2007 9–2008
- 41 Wins in 250/450 AMA Supercross: 2–2009 7–2010 6–2011 9–2012 10–2013 7–2014
- 12 Wins in 250/450 AMA Motocross: 1–2009 3–2011 8–2013
- 73 Total AMA Wins: 6–2006 5–2007 9–2008 3–2009 7–2010 9–2011 9–2012 18–2013 7–2014
- 1 Win in MXGP: 1–2015

=== Stadium Super Trucks ===
(key) (Bold – Pole position. Italics – Fastest qualifier. * – Most laps led.)

Stadium Super Trucks results
Year	1	2	3	4	5	6	7	8	9	10	11	12	13	14	15	16	17	18	19	20	21	22	SSTC	Pts	Ref
2017	ADE	ADE	ADE	STP	STP	LBH	LBH	PER	PER	PER	DET	DET	TEX	TEX	HID	HID	HID	BEI	GLN	GLN	ELS; 10	ELS; 10	20th	35	
