= 2024 AMA Supercross Championship =

Edition of AMA Supercross Championship

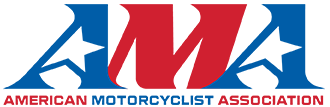
- Organizer: American Motorcyclist Association, Feld Entertainment (except Daytona), NASCAR Holdings, Inc. (Daytona)
- Discipline: Supercross
- Duration: January – May 2024
- Number of races: 17
- TV partners: NBC Sports (NBC, USA Network, CNBC, Peacock)

Champions
- 450cc: (Australia) Jett Lawrence
- 250cc West: (United States) RJ Hampshire
- 250cc East: (France) Tom Vialle

AMA Supercross Championship
- ← 2023 2025 →

The 2024 AMA Supercross Championship was the 51st season of off-road stadium motorcycle racing in the United States.

Comprising 17 rounds, the series ran from January until May, crowning supercross champions in both the 250cc and 450cc classes, concluding with the Salt Lake City round on May 11. Chase Sexton went into the season as the reigning champion in the premier 450SX class.

In his rookie season in the 450SX class, The Australian Jett Lawrence won eight main events to take the title since Chad Reed in 2008. After ten years in the professional ranks, RJ Hampshire won his first supercross title in the 250SX West class, whilst former two-time FIM Motocross World Champion Tom Vialle won his first supercross title in the 250SX East class.

The series formed the first part of the 2024 SuperMotocross World Championship.

== Schedule and results ==
2024 Monster Energy AMA Supercross Championship
Round (250 East/West)	Date	Location	Stadium	Broadcast	450cc Winner	250cc Winner
1 (W)	January 6	(California) Anaheim	Angel Stadium	Peacock, USA (live), NBC (delay)	(Australia) Jett Lawrence (1)	(United States) RJ Hampshire (1)
2 (W)	January 13	(California) San Francisco	Oracle Park	Peacock (live), NBC (delay)	(United States) Chase Sexton (1)	(United States) Jordon Smith (1)
3 (W)	January 20	(California) San Diego	Snapdragon Stadium	Peacock (live)	(United States) Aaron Plessinger (1)	(United States) Nate Thrasher (1)
4 (W) Triple Crown	January 27	(California) Anaheim 2	Angel Stadium	Peacock (live)	(United States) Cooper Webb (1)	(United States) Levi Kitchen (1)
5 (E)	February 3	(Michigan) Detroit	Ford Field	Peacock, NBC (live)	(Australia) Jett Lawrence (2)	(United States) Austin Forkner (1)
6 (W)	February 10	(Arizona) Glendale	State Farm Stadium	Peacock (live)	(Germany) Ken Roczen (1)	(United States) RJ Hampshire (2)
7 (E)	February 24	(Texas) Arlington	AT&T Stadium	Peacock (live)	(United States) Cooper Webb (2)	(United States) Haiden Deegan (1)
8 (E)	March 2	(Florida) Daytona	Daytona International Speedway	Peacock (live)	(Australia) Jett Lawrence (3)	(France) Tom Vialle (1)
9 (E)	March 9	(Alabama) Birmingham	Protective Stadium	Peacock (live)	(Australia) Jett Lawrence (4)	(France) Tom Vialle (2)
10 (E) Triple Crown	March 16	(Indiana) Indianapolis	Lucas Oil Stadium	Peacock (live)	(Australia) Jett Lawrence (5)	(United States) Cameron McAdoo (1)
11 (W)	March 23	(Washington (state)) Seattle	Lumen Field	Peacock (live)	(United States) Cooper Webb (3)	(United States) Levi Kitchen (2)
12 (W) Triple Crown	March 30	(Missouri) St. Louis	The Dome at America's Center	Peacock (live)	(United States) Eli Tomac (1)	(United States) Levi Kitchen (3)
13 (E)	April 13	(Massachusetts) Foxborough	Gillette Stadium	Peacock (live)	(United States) Cooper Webb (4)	(United States) Haiden Deegan (2)
14 (E/W)	April 20	(Tennessee) Nashville	Nissan Stadium	Peacock (live)	(Australia) Jett Lawrence (6)	(United States) RJ Hampshire (3)
15 (E)	April 27	(Pennsylvania) Philadelphia	Lincoln Financial Field	Peacock, NBC (live)	(Australia) Jett Lawrence (7)	(United Kingdom) Max Anstie (1)
16 (W)	May 4	(Colorado) Denver	Empower Field at Mile High	Peacock (live), NBC (delay)	(Australia) Jett Lawrence (8)	(Japan) Jo Shimoda (1)
17 (E/W)	May 11	(Utah) Salt Lake City	Rice-Eccles Stadium	Peacock, USA (live), NBC (delay)	(United States) Chase Sexton (2)	(United States) Haiden Deegan (3)

=== Stadium locations ===
2023 AMA Supercross Championship locations

== 450 SX ==
=== Entry list ===
Team	Constructor	No	Rider	Rounds
Red Bull KTM Factory Racing USA	KTM	1	(United States) Chase Sexton	All
Red Bull KTM Factory Racing USA	KTM	7	(United States) Aaron Plessinger	1–13
Monster Energy Yamaha Star Racing	Yamaha	2	(United States) Cooper Webb	All
Monster Energy Yamaha Star Racing	Yamaha	3	(United States) Eli Tomac	1–16
Monster Energy Yamaha Star Racing	Yamaha	32	(United States) Justin Cooper	All
Monster Energy Kawasaki	Kawasaki	9	(United States) Adam Cianciarulo	1–4, 8–17
Monster Energy Kawasaki	Kawasaki	21	(United States) Jason Anderson	All
Twisted Tea Suzuki Presented by Progressive Insurance	Suzuki	11	(United States) Kyle Chisholm	All
Twisted Tea Suzuki Presented by Progressive Insurance	Suzuki	12	(United States) Shane McElrath	All
Phoenix Racing Honda	Honda	14	(France) Dylan Ferrandis	1–9, 15-17
FirePower Honda Racing	Honda	15	(United Kingdom) Dean Wilson	1–8, 14–17
Team Honda HRC	Honda	18	(Australia) Jett Lawrence	All
Team Honda HRC	Honda	96	(Australia) Hunter Lawrence	1–8, 10–17
MaddParts.com Kawasaki Race Team	Kawasaki	22	(Sweden) Fredrik Noren	1–12, 14–17
MaddParts.com Kawasaki Race Team	Kawasaki	74	(United States) Josh Cartwright	1–6, 8–17
MaddParts.com Kawasaki Race Team	Kawasaki	282	(United States) Theodore Pauli	1–7, 11, 13–17
Gizmo Mods Rock River Yamaha Racing	Yamaha	23	(Guam) Grant Harlan	7–17
Gizmo Mods Rock River Yamaha Racing	Yamaha	75	(United States) Marshal Weltin	3–4, 6, 16
Gizmo Mods Rock River Yamaha Racing	Yamaha	80	(United States) Michael Hicks	6
Gizmo Mods Rock River Yamaha Racing	Yamaha	91	(United States) Devin Simonson	1–3, 5–11, 13–17
Gizmo Mods Rock River Yamaha Racing	Yamaha	116	(United States) TJ Albright	7–9, 13, 15
Gizmo Mods Rock River Yamaha Racing	Yamaha	200	(United States) Ryan Breece	10–11, 13
Rockstar Energy Husqvarna Factory Racing USA	Husqvarna	27	(United States) Malcolm Stewart	All
Rockstar Energy Husqvarna Factory Racing USA	Husqvarna	28	(United States) Christian Craig	1–6
HBI Racing Kawasaki	Kawasaki	29	(United States) Ty Masterpool	7–16
Smartop MotoConcepts Honda Racing	Honda	41	(United States) Carson Mumford	7
Smartop MotoConcepts Honda Racing	Honda	55	(United States) Mitchell Oldenburg	7, 11–12, 14, 16–17
Smartop MotoConcepts Honda Racing	Honda	125	(United States) Vince Friese	1–4, 6–7, 11–12, 14, 16–17
Monster Energy/Mountain Motorsports	Yamaha	44	(United States) Josh Hill	1, 3–4, 6, 8, 14–15
Liqui Moly Beta Racing	Beta	45	(United States) Colt Nichols	9–17
Liqui Moly Beta Racing	Beta	67	(Guam) Benny Bloss	1–16
Liqui Moly Beta Racing	Beta	199	(United States) John Short	1–6
Jones Powersports	Kawasaki	199	(United States) John Short	7–10, 17
Team Tedder Monster Energy KTM	KTM	46	(United States) Justin Hill	1–8, 12–17
Troy Lee Designs Red Bull GASGAS Factory Racing	GASGAS	51	(United States) Justin Barcia	All
Troy Lee Designs Red Bull GASGAS Factory Racing	GASGAS	111	(Spain) Jorge Prado	1–4
Toyota Redlands BARX Suzuki	Suzuki	52	(United States) Derek Drake	1–7, 10–13
Toyota Redlands BARX Suzuki	Suzuki	100	(France) Anthony Bourdon	8–9, 15
Valley Automotive Group	Honda	56	(United States) Jeremy Hand	5–9, 12–17
Kevin Moranz Racing Champion KTM	KTM	62	(United States) Kevin Moranz	1–2, 6, 10–17
TiLube Honda Racing	Honda	65	(United States) Henry Miller	4, 12, 16
Landmaster/Honda Racing/JSR Motorsports	Honda	66	(United States) Justin Starling	1–4, 6–8, 10, 12–14, 16–17
Estenson Racing/TruLine Corp	Yamaha	70	(United States) Jerry Robin	1–9, 12–17
Team Solitaire Heartbeat Hot Sauce Yamaha	Yamaha	73	(United States) Robbie Wageman	7
Partzilla PRMX Kawasaki	Kawasaki	81	(United States) Cade Clason	All
Partzilla PRMX Kawasaki	Kawasaki	82	(United States) Mitchell Harrison	1–3, 5–17
Partzilla PRMX Kawasaki	Kawasaki	109	(Australia) Aaron Tanti	9
Rides Unlimited Rocky Mountain ATV MC Racing	KTM	84	(Venezuela) Anthony Rodriguez	1–4, 7–17
Rides Unlimited Rocky Mountain ATV MC Racing	KTM	364	(United States) Chad Saultz	8–9, 13
Rides Unlimited Rocky Mountain ATV MC Racing	KTM	702	(United States) Hunter Cross	1–4, 6
Kessler Concrete ATeam RevX Yamaha	Yamaha	92	(United States) Jace Kessler	1–5
Progressive Insurance ECSTAR Suzuki	Suzuki	94	(Germany) Ken Roczen	1–14
Team Next Level Racing	KTM	97	(United States) Tristan Lane	All
Team Next Level Racing	KTM	148	(United States) Justin Rodbell	2–17
Team Next Level Racing	KTM	173	(United States) Hunter Schlosser	All
Team Next Level Racing	KTM	411	(United States) Scott Meshey	1–16
Team Next Level Racing	KTM	645	(United States) Colby Copp	1–14, 17
CREO KTM	KTM	108	(Estonia) Jörgen-Matthias Talviku	16
NN Realty/Accurate Shade	Honda	117	(United States) Nicholas Nisbet	1–4
CHR/Lone Star Yamaha/Galaxy Cloaking	Yamaha	118	(United States) Cheyenne Harmon	1–11, 14–17
Slavens Racing	GASGAS	120	(United States) Todd Bannister	16
Smell Good Athlete/Toyota of Redlands	Yamaha	121	(United States) Chris Howell	1, 17
	Yamaha	129	(United States) Lane Shaw	1, 3–4, 6–10, 12, 14
DPMX OnlyFans Racing Yamaha	Yamaha	138	(United States) David Pulley Jr.	1, 3–4, 6, 16
	Kawasaki	144	(France) Jason Clermont	1–4, 6
Fenestella/Interstate69Motorsports	Honda	146	(United States) Brandon Marley	1–5, 7
The Privateer Paddock	Kawasaki	152	(United States) Hunter Calle	8, 13
OnlyFans Kawasaki	Kawasaki	169	(United States) Logan Karnow	1
Namura/Automatic Distributors/Invictus Speed Crew	Yamaha	200	(United States) Ryan Breece	7–8
Namura/Automatic Distributors/Invictus Speed Crew	Kawasaki	431	(Brazil) Caio Lopes	8
Canvas	Yamaha	204	(United States) Kyle Greeson	1–4, 6
The Dirt Bike Depot Racing Team	Kawasaki	208	(United States) Logan Leitzel	11–12, 16
SR75 World Team Suzuki	Suzuki	210	(France) Thomas Ramette	1
Epcon Partners Powersports Northwest	Yamaha	246	(United States) Chance Blackburn	11
Raptor Blaster/Seven MX/Happy Bad Golf	Yamaha	250	(United States) Corbin Hayes	2
Honda Genuine Honda Racing	Honda	262	(Australia) Dylan Wood	4
Team Faith	Yamaha	289	(United States) Robert Hailey	7–9
Sofa Brand MX BWR Engines	Honda	299	(United States) Konnor Visger	3–4, 12, 16
Western Transportation Group	Kawasaki	351	(United States) Jack Rogers	14
Munson Excavating	Kawasaki	382	(United States) Rylan Munson	5, 7–9, 12, 14, 16
	Yamaha	412	(United States) Jared Lesher	8–10, 14
Rutted Racing	KTM	414	(United States) Mason Morris	12
RJC Racing	Kawasaki	447	(United States) Deven Raper	6–7, 9, 14, 16–17
Galaxy Cloaking/TexasTruckWorks/Ronnie Prado Company	Kawasaki	501	(United States) Scotty Wennerstrom	1–12, 14
Rockwell SKVI Bemer	KTM	509	(United States) Alexander Nagy	10, 15, 17
TPJ Fly Racing Team	Kawasaki	512	(United States) Austin Cozadd	1–2, 5, 7–10, 13–15, 17
538	Yamaha	538	(United States) Addison Emory IV	7–10, 15
Vivid Designs	Husqvarna	542	(United States) Johnnie Buller	1–2, 4
Junior Mecanique Plus	KTM	551	(Canada) Guillaume St-Cyr	13
Lasting Impressions CG LLC	Honda	581	(United States) Kyle Bitterman	14–15
Lakeside Contractors	Honda	597	(United States) Mason Kerr	7–8
The 606 Factory	GASGAS	606	(United States) Ronnie Stewart	8, 13, 15
Kalaitzian Brothers Racing	Honda	636	(United States) Luke Kalaitzian	1–4, 6–8, 11, 16–17
CREO KTM	KTM	667	(Sweden) Anton Nordström Graaf	12
SWLF	Yamaha	672	(United States) Brandon Pederson	1, 3–7, 9–17
RMCP	Husqvarna	676	(United States) Robert Fitch	5, 8
MotoSport Hillsboro	Husqvarna	726	(United States) Gared Steinke	1–4, 6, 11, 16
High Desert Racing	Kawasaki	792	(United States) Bracken Hall	17
Shredco/Stahlman Powersports	Kawasaki	824	(United States) Carter Stephenson	1, 3–4, 6–8, 10–12, 14–15, 17
Limited Decal LGC Wheels	KTM	831	(United States) Jacob Glenn	15
TWhite KRW Cycles/Rozoy Picot/Fund My Race	Kawasaki	848	(Spain) Joan Cros	1–6, 8, 10–17
Fusion/RSR/Stussy	Honda	874	(United States) Zack Williams	7–10, 12
Motosport Hillsboro	KTM	916	(United States) Devin Harriman	7
Pro-Moto Suspension	Yamaha	930	(Australia) Joel Wightman	1–6, 16–17
Storm Lake Honda	Honda	942	(United States) Deegan Hepp	1, 5, 7
TMR Racing The Mahoney's	GASGAS	976	(United States) Josh Greco	7–10, 13–15
AJE Motorsports	GASGAS	981	(United States) Austin Politelli	1–4, 8, 11, 14, 16–17
Yankton Motorsport	Kawasaki	996	(United States) Preston Taylor	7–10, 14–15

=== Championship Standings ===
Pos	Rider	Bike	ANA (California)	SFR (California)	SDI (California)	ANA (California)	DET (Michigan)	GLE (Arizona)	ARL (Texas)	DAY (Florida)	BIR (Alabama)	IND (Indiana)	SEA (Washington (state))	STL (Missouri)	FOX (Massachusetts)	NAS (Tennessee)	PHI (Pennsylvania)	DEN (Colorado)	SLC (Utah)	Points
1	(Australia) Jett Lawrence	Honda	1	9	4	6	1	3	4	1	1	1	3	8	5	1	1	1	7	351
2	(United States) Cooper Webb	Yamaha	6	11	2	1	4	7	1	4	2	5	1	2	1	3	4	5	3	336
3	(United States) Chase Sexton	KTM	3	1	8	5	2	9	6	3	4	3	2	5	2	Ret	2	8	1	307
4	(United States) Eli Tomac	Yamaha	9	2	9	2	10	4	2	2	7	7	6	1	6	2	5	10		282
5	(United States) Jason Anderson	Kawasaki	2	12	5	4	5	2	10	9	6	4	10	11	4	4	3	3	4	282
6	(United States) Justin Cooper	Yamaha	8	DNQ	14	8	9	11	7	6	5	10	8	9	8	6	10	6	2	227
7	(Germany) Ken Roczen	Suzuki	10	3	12	7	3	1	8	5	3	2	5	12	3	21				223
8	(United States) Justin Barcia	GASGAS	7	17	3	13	12	18	14	11	9	8	9	6	11	5	6	4	5	217
9	(Australia) Hunter Lawrence	Honda	DNQ	10	7	11	8	5	5	21		11	7	3	7	7	7	2	15	207
10	(United States) Malcolm Stewart	Husqvarna	11	Ret	19	10	11	8	9	7	10	9	11	7	10	9	8	7	6	200
11	(United States) Aaron Plessinger	KTM	4	5	1	3	6	10	3	18	8	6	4	4	DNS					198
12	(France) Dylan Ferrandis	Honda	5	6	6	9	7	6	Ret	8	Ret						9	9	8	147
13	(United States) Shane McElrath	Suzuki	17	4	16	18	14	14	15	14	11	12	16	10	21	13	15	18	14	132
14	(United States) Adam Cianciarulo	Kawasaki	12	8	13	DNQ				12	12	15	14	22	15	14	14	15	20	95
15	(Guam) Benny Bloss	Beta	DNQ	DNQ	15	20	20	17	17	10	14	22	12	13	12	8	12			94
16	(United Kingdom) Dean Wilson	Honda	16	16	10	DNQ	17	16	13	20						11	11	11	10	91
17	(United States) Justin Hill	KTM	14	DNQ	DNQ	15	21	15	16	Ret				17	9	12	DNQ	17	13	71
18	(United States) Kyle Chisholm	Suzuki	18	DNQ	DNQ	17	16	19	DNQ	13	17	13	DNQ	14	17	16	DNQ	DNQ	16	66
19	(United States) Vince Friese	Honda	Ret	DNQ	22	16		13	11				15	19		10		16	12	64
20	(United States) Colt Nichols	Beta									13	14	DNQ	15	13	DNQ	13	13	11	62
21	(United States) Mitchell Oldenburg	Honda							12				13	16		15		12	9	55
22	(Spain) Jorge Prado	GASGAS	13	7	11	12														45
23	(United States) Christian Craig	Husqvarna	20	14	20	14	13	12												39
24	(Sweden) Fredrik Norén	Kawasaki	21	20	17	19	Ret	20	DNQ	19	18	21	DNQ	21		17	DNQ	14	19	38
25	(United States) Cade Clason	Kawasaki	19	19	18	DNQ	DNQ	DNQ	DNQ	DNQ	DNQ	17	19	20	16	DNQ	17	19	DNQ	34
26	(United States) Derek Drake	Suzuki	15	13	DNQ	21	15	21	DNQ			18	18	DNQ	DNQ					33
27	(United States) Mitchell Harrison	Kawasaki	DNQ	DNQ	DNQ		18	DNQ	DNQ	DNQ	15	16	Ret	DNQ	14	DNQ	DNQ	22	DNQ	25
28	(United States) Jeremy Hand	Honda					DNQ	DNQ	DNQ	17	DNQ			18	18	19	DNQ	20	17	23
29	(United States) Ty Masterpool	Kawasaki							DNQ	16	DNQ	DNQ	17	DNQ	20	DNQ	16			19
30	(Guam) Grant Harlan	Yamaha							DNQ	DNQ	20	DNQ	DNQ	DNQ	DNQ	18	19	DNQ	18	13
31	(United States) Jerry Robin	Yamaha	DNQ	DNQ	DNQ	DNQ	DNQ	DNQ	20	DNQ	DNQ			DNQ	19	DNQ	18	21	DNQ	10
32	(United States) John Short	Beta	DNQ	DNQ	DNQ	DNQ	DNQ	DNQ												8
32	(United States) John Short	Kawasaki							DNQ	15	21	DNQ						DNQ	DNQ	8
33	(United States) Austin Politelli	GASGAS	DNQ	15	DNQ	DNQ				DNQ			DNQ			DNQ		DNQ	DNQ	7
34	(France) Anthony Bourdon	Suzuki								DNQ	16						21			7
35	(United States) Ryan Breece	Yamaha							18	DNQ		DNQ	20		DNQ					6
36	(United States) Justin Rodbell	KTM		18	21	DNQ	DNQ	DNQ	DNQ	DNQ	DNQ	DNQ	21	DNQ	DNQ	DNQ	DNQ	DNQ	DNQ	6
37	(United States) Devin Simonson	Yamaha	DNQ	DNQ	DNQ		DNQ	22	DNQ	DNQ	DNQ	19	DNQ		22	DNQ	22	DNQ	21	4
38	(United States) Carson Mumford	Honda							19											3
39	(Australia) Aaron Tanti	Kawasaki									19									3
40	(United States) Tristan Lane	KTM	DNQ	DNQ	DNQ	DNQ	19	DNQ	DNQ	DNQ	DNQ	DNQ	DNQ	DNQ	DNQ	DNQ	DNQ	DNQ	DNQ	3
41	(United States) Justin Starling	Honda	DNQ	DNQ	DNQ	DNQ		DNQ	DNQ	DNQ		20		DNQ	DNQ	DNQ		DNQ	DNQ	2
42	(United States) Josh Hill	Yamaha	DNQ		DNQ	DNQ		DNQ		DNQ						20	DNQ			2
43	(United States) Kevin Moranz	KTM	DNQ	DNQ				DNQ				DNQ	DNQ	DNQ	DNQ	DNQ	20	DNQ	22	2
44	(United States) Robbie Wageman	Yamaha							21											1
45	(France) Jason Clermont	Kawasaki	DNQ	21	DNQ	DNQ		DNQ												1
	(United States) Luke Kalaitzian	Honda	DNQ	DNQ	DNQ	22		DNQ	DNQ	DNQ			DNQ					DNQ	DNQ	0
	(United States) Hunter Schlosser	KTM	DNQ	DNQ	DNQ	DNQ	DNQ	DNQ	DNQ	DNQ	DNQ	DNQ	DNQ	DNQ	DNQ	DNQ	DNQ	DNQ	DNQ	0
	(United States) Scott Meshey	KTM	DNQ	DNQ	DNQ	DNQ	DNQ	DNQ	DNQ	DNQ	DNQ	DNQ	DNQ	DNQ	DNQ	DNQ	DNQ	DNQ		0
	(United States) Josh Cartwright	Kawasaki	DNQ	DNQ	DNQ	DNQ	DNQ	DNQ		DNQ	DNQ	DNQ	DNQ	DNQ	DNQ	DNQ	DNQ	DNQ	DNQ	0
	(United States) Colby Copp	KTM	DNQ	DNQ	DNQ	DNQ	DNQ	DNQ	DNQ	DNQ	DNQ	DNQ	DNQ	DNQ	DNQ	DNQ			DNQ	0
	(United States) Cheyenne Harmon	Yamaha	DNQ	DNQ	DNQ	DNQ	DNQ	DNQ	DNQ	DNQ	DNQ	DNQ	DNQ			DNQ	DNQ	DNQ	DNQ	0
	(Spain) Joan Cros	Kawasaki	DNQ	DNQ	DNQ	DNQ	DNQ	DNQ		DNQ		DNQ	DNQ	DNQ	DNQ	DNQ	DNQ	DNQ	DNQ	0
	(Venezuela) Anthony Rodriguez	KTM	DNQ	DNQ	DNQ	DNQ			DNQ	DNQ	DNQ	DNQ	DNQ	DNQ	DNQ	DNQ	DNQ	DNQ	DNQ	0
	(United States) Brandon Pederson	Yamaha	DNQ		DNQ	DNQ	DNQ	DNQ	DNQ		DNQ	DNQ	DNQ	DNQ	DNQ	DNQ	DNQ	DNQ	DNQ	0
	(United States) Scotty Wennerstrom	Kawasaki	DNQ	DNQ	DNQ	DNQ	DNQ	DNQ	DNQ	DNQ	DNQ	DNQ	DNQ	DNQ		DNQ				0
	(United States) Theodore Pauli	Kawasaki	DNQ	DNQ	DNQ	DNQ	DNQ	DNQ	DNQ				DNQ		DNQ	DNQ	DNQ	DNQ	DNQ	0
	(United States) Carter Stephenson	Kawasaki	DNQ		DNQ	DNQ		DNQ	DNQ	DNQ		DNQ	DNQ	DNQ		DNQ	DNQ		DNQ	0
	(United States) Austin Cozadd	Kawasaki	DNQ	DNQ			DNQ		DNQ	DNQ	DNQ	DNQ			DNQ	DNQ	DNQ		DNQ	0
	(United States) Lane Shaw	Yamaha	DNQ		DNQ	DNQ		DNQ	DNQ	DNQ	DNQ	DNQ		DNQ		DNQ				0
	(Australia) Joel Wightman	Yamaha	DNQ	DNQ	DNQ	DNQ	DNQ	DNQ										DNQ	DNQ	0
	(United States) Gared Steinke	Husqvarna	DNQ	DNQ	DNQ	DNQ		DNQ					DNQ					DNQ		0
	(United States) Rylan Munson	Kawasaki					DNQ		DNQ	DNQ	DNQ			DNQ		DNQ		DNQ		0
	(United States) Josh Greco	GASGAS							DNQ	DNQ	DNQ	DNQ			DNQ	DNQ	DNQ			0
	(United States) Brandon Marley	Honda	DNQ	DNQ	DNQ	DNQ	DNQ		DNQ											0
	(United States) Deven Raper	Kawasaki						DNQ	DNQ		DNQ					DNQ		DNQ	DNQ	0
	(United States) Preston Taylor	Kawasaki							DNQ	DNQ	DNQ	DNQ				DNQ	DNQ			0
	(United States) Jace Kessler	Yamaha	DNQ	DNQ	DNQ	DNQ	DNQ													0
	(United States) Hunter Cross	KTM	DNQ	DNQ	DNQ	DNQ		DNQ												0
	(United States) Kyle Greeson	Yamaha	DNQ	DNQ	DNQ	DNQ		DNQ												0
	(United States) David Pulley Jr.	Yamaha	DNQ		DNQ	DNQ		DNQ										DNQ		0
	(United States) Zack Williams	Honda							DNQ	DNQ	DNQ	DNQ		DNQ						0
	(United States) Addison Emory IV	Yamaha							DNQ	DNQ	DNQ	DNQ					DNQ			0
	(United States) TJ Albright	Yamaha							DNQ	DNQ	DNQ				DNQ		DNQ			0
	(United States) Nicholas Nisbet	Honda	DNQ	DNQ	DNQ	DNQ														0
	(United States) Marshal Weltin	Yamaha			DNQ	DNQ		DNQ										DNQ		0
	(United States) Konnor Visger	Honda			DNQ	DNQ								DNQ				DNQ		0
	(United States) Jared Lesher	Yamaha								DNQ	DNQ	DNQ				DNQ				0
	(United States) Johnnie Buller	Husqvarna	DNQ	DNQ		DNQ														0
	(United States) Deegan Hepp	Honda	DNQ				DNQ		DNQ											0
	(United States) Henry Miller	Honda				DNQ								DNQ				DNQ		0
	(United States) Robert Hailey	Yamaha							DNQ	DNQ	DNQ									0
	(United States) Chad Saultz	KTM								DNQ	DNQ				DNQ					0
	(United States) Ronnie Stewart	GASGAS								DNQ					DNQ		DNQ			0
	(United States) Alexander Nagy	KTM										DNQ					DNQ		DNQ	0
	(United States) Logan Leitzel	Kawasaki											DNQ	DNQ				DNQ		0
	(United States) Chris Howell	Yamaha	DNQ																DNQ	0
	(United States) Robert Fitch	Husqvarna					DNQ			DNQ										0
	(United States) Mason Kerr	Honda							DNQ	DNQ										0
	(United States) Hunter Calle	Kawasaki								DNQ					DNQ					0
	(United States) Kyle Bitterman	Honda														DNQ	DNQ			0
	(France) Thomas Ramette	Suzuki	DNQ																	0
	(United States) Logan Karnow	Kawasaki	DNQ																	0
	(United States) Corbin Hayes	Yamaha		DNQ																0
	(Australia) Dylan Wood	Honda				DNQ														0
	(United States) Michael Hicks	Yamaha						DNQ												0
	(United States) Devin Harriman	KTM							DNQ											0
	(Brazil) Caio Lopes	Kawasaki								DNQ										0
	(United States) Chance Blackburn	Yamaha											DNQ							0
	(Sweden) Anton Nordström Graaf	KTM												DNQ						0
	(United States) Mason Morris	KTM												DNQ						0
	(Canada) Guillaume St-Cyr	KTM													DNQ					0
	(United States) Jack Rogers	Kawasaki														DNQ				0
	(United States) Jacob Glenn	KTM															DNQ			0
	(Estonia) Jörgen-Matthias Talviku	KTM																DNQ		0
	(United States) Todd Bannister	GASGAS																DNQ		0
	(United States) Bracken Hall	Kawasaki																	DNQ	0
Pos	Rider	Bike	ANA (California)	SFR (California)	SDI (California)	ANA (California)	DET (Michigan)	GLE (Arizona)	ARL (Texas)	DAY (Florida)	BIR (Alabama)	IND (Indiana)	SEA (Washington (state))	STL (Missouri)	FOX (Massachusetts)	NAS (Tennessee)	PHI (Pennsylvania)	DEN (Colorado)	SLC (Utah)	Points

== 250 SX West ==
=== Entry list ===
Team	Constructor	No	Rider	Rounds
Monster Energy Pro Circuit Kawasaki	Kawasaki	20	(United States) Max Vohland	1–2
Monster Energy Pro Circuit Kawasaki	Kawasaki	47	(United States) Levi Kitchen	All
Rockstar Energy Husqvarna Factory Racing	Husqvarna	24	(United States) RJ Hampshire	All
Muc-Off FXR ClubMX Yamaha Racing	Yamaha	26	(United States) Garrett Marchbanks	1–8
Muc-Off FXR ClubMX Yamaha Racing	Yamaha	36	(United States) Phil Nicoletti	All
Team Honda HRC	Honda	30	(Japan) Jo Shimoda	All
Monster Energy Star Racing Yamaha	Yamaha	31	(United States) Jordon Smith	All
Monster Energy Star Racing Yamaha	Yamaha	57	(United States) Nate Thrasher	All
Monster Energy Star Racing Yamaha	Yamaha	76	(United States) Michael Mosiman	6–7
Troy Lee Designs Red Bull Gas Gas	GASGAS	34	(United States) Ryder DiFrancesco	All
AEO Powersports KTM Racing	KTM	35	(United States) Talon Hawkins	All
AEO Powersports KTM Racing	KTM	473	(United States) Lux Turner	1, 6–10
Smartop MotoConcepts Honda Racing	Honda	41	(United States) Carson Mumford	1–8
Smartop MotoConcepts Honda Racing	Honda	55	(United States) Mitchell Oldenburg	1–5
Smartop MotoConcepts Honda Racing	Honda	943	(Canada) Noah Viney	9–10
Team Solitaire Heartbeat Hot Sauce Yamaha	Yamaha	71	(Canada) Cole Thompson	All
Team Solitaire Heartbeat Hot Sauce Yamaha	Yamaha	73	(United States) Robbie Wageman	All
AJE Motorsports	GASGAS	78	(Guam) Josua Varize	All
AJE Motorsports	GASGAS	245	(Denmark) Matti Jørgensen	1–9
Partzilla PRMX Kawasaki	Kawasaki	85	(United States) Hunter Yoder	1–9
Partzilla PRMX Kawasaki	Kawasaki	275	(Australia) Travis Olander	1, 4
Toyota Redlands BARX Suzuki	Suzuki	87	(United States) Max Miller	All
Toyota Redlands BARX Suzuki	Suzuki	100	(France) Anthony Bourdon	All
Host Grindstone Kawasaki	Kawasaki	88	(New Zealand) Dylan Walsh	1, 6
Host Grindstone Kawasaki	Kawasaki	162	(United States) Maxwell Sanford	3–10
Grindstone	Honda	162	(United States) Maxwell Sanford	1–2
Gizmo Mods Rock River Yamaha Racing	Yamaha	91	(United States) Devin Simonson	7
Gizmo Mods Rock River Yamaha Racing	Yamaha	116	(United States) TJ Albright	All
The Privateer Paddock	Yamaha	113	(United States) Braden Spangle	1–3, 5–6
The Privateer Paddock	Kawasaki	152	(United States) Hunter Calle	1–7
The Privateer Paddock	Kawasaki	339	(United States) Joe Desimone	1–6
MMG	Kawasaki	114	(Australia) Geran Stapleton	1–4, 6–10
NN Realty/Accurate Shade	Honda	117	(United States) Nicholas Nisbet	5–6, 9–10
CHR/Lone Star Yamaha/Galaxy Cloaking	Yamaha	118	(United States) Cheyenne Harmon	7
Smell Good Athlete/Toyota of Redlands	Yamaha	121	(United States) Chris Howell	2–6, 9
Team Faith	Yamaha	132	(United States) Billy Laninovich	1–5, 9
Team Faith	Yamaha	289	(United States) Robert Hailey	2–10
STR Honda	Honda	135	(United States) Lance Kobusch	1–4
Fenestella/Interstate69Motorsports	Yamaha	146	(United States) Brandon Marley	7–8
The Pit Enterprise	Kawasaki	147	(United States) Ryan Carlson	2–3, 5, 9
Hustle Hard Energy	GASGAS	158	(Mexico) Tre Fierro	1–6, 9
Motosport Hillsboro	Kawasaki	207	(United States) Rider Fisher	6, 9
Sun Enterprises/Applied Technology	Kawasaki	244	(United States) Mike Henderson	9
Nayt Co Hyperperformance Coaching	Yamaha	316	(United States) Ty Freehill	2–3, 5–6
Monster Energy Twisted Development Yamaha	Yamaha	334	(Australia) Brad West	6–7, 9–10
The Functional Neurology Center	Kawasaki	343	(United States) Carter Biese	1–7
K&M Rebar Privateer Paddock	Honda	349	(United States) Kile Epperson	6–9
Rides Unlimited Rocky Mountain ATV MC Racing	KTM	364	(United States) Chad Saultz	2–10
TPJ Fly Racing Team	Kawasaki	378	(United States) Kyle Wise	1–6, 8–10
TPJ Fly Racing Team	Kawasaki	512	(United States) Austin Cozadd	3–7, 9
TPJ Fly Racing Team	Kawasaki	767	(United States) Mason Wharton	
Team Green	Kawasaki	401	(United States) Blake Gardner	6–7
AP3 inc.	Suzuki	446	(United States) Blaine Silveira	1–6, 9
SPR/Legacy Graphics/Z's Main Street	GASGAS	464	(United States) Doc Smith	1–5, 7, 9
Experience Powersports	Yamaha	476	(United States) Colin Jurin	6
Capitol Cycle	GASGAS	490	(United States) Ragan Cochran	3–5, 7, 9
Fund My Race/OG's Optics	Kawasaki	500	(Canada) Julien Benek	1–2, 6, 9–10
Rockwell SKVI Bemer	KTM	509	(United States) Alexander Nagy	1–5, 7, 9
538	Yamaha	538	(United States) Addison Emory IV	1–8
Junior Mecanique Plus	KTM	551	(Canada) Guillaume St-Cyr	1–7
High Desert Racing	Kawasaki	792	(United States) Bracken Hall	9
HBI Racing Kawasaki	Kawasaki	805	(United States) Slade Varola	All
CREO KTM	KTM	824	(United States) Carter Stephenson	9
Red Bull KTM Factory Racing	KTM	929	(United States) Julien Beaumer	All
Storm Lake Honda	Honda	942	(United States) Deegan Hepp	2–4, 7–9
TMR Racing The Mahoney's	GASGAS	976	(United States) Josh Greco	1–5, 7, 9–10
Yankton Motorsports	Kawasaki	996	(United States) Preston Taylor	7, 9–10

=== Championship Standings ===
Pos	Rider	Bike	ANA (California)	SFR (California)	SDI (California)	ANA (California)	GLE (Arizona)	SEA (Washington (state))	STL (Missouri)	NAS (Tennessee)	DEN (Colorado)	SLC (Utah)	Points
1	(United States) RJ Hampshire	Husqvarna	1	9	6	2	1	2	4	1	3	2	208
2	(United States) Levi Kitchen	Kawasaki	3	2	5	1	2	1	1	14	2	5	203
3	(United States) Jordon Smith	Yamaha	2	1	3	5	4	14	3	4	5	3	185
4	(Japan) Jo Shimoda	Honda	4	Ret	4	4	3	3	2	2	1	4	181
5	(United States) Nate Thrasher	Yamaha	21	18	1	3	DNQ	9	5	13	4	6	123
6	(United States) Garrett Marchbanks	Yamaha	7	3	2	9	5	4	6	DNQ			121
7	(United States) Julien Beaumer	KTM	6	11	16	7	7	7	7	9	10	22	118
8	(France) Anthony Bourdon	Suzuki	11	6	10	6	12	8	11	16	16	18	106
9	(United States) Phil Nicoletti	Yamaha	DNS	4	Ret	10	8	11	12	10	6	10	105
10	(Canada) Cole Thompson	Yamaha	12	15	12	15	13	10	15	17	7	15	89
11	(United States) Carson Mumford	Honda	10	5	15	11	11	5	9	DNQ			88
12	(United States) Ryder DiFrancesco	GASGAS	9	21	8	8	Ret	13	8	19	11	13	88
13	(United States) Hunter Yoder	Kawasaki	13	8	9	14	10	16	13	DNQ	14		79
14	(United States) Robbie Wageman	Yamaha	14	DNQ	11	13	9	12	16	DNQ	8	DNQ	71
15	(United States) Mitchell Oldenburg	Honda	8	10	7	12	6						67
16	(Guam) Josua Varize	GASGAS	15	7	13	18	16	20	20	DNQ	13	DNQ	54
17	(United States) Talon Hawkins	KTM	18	DNQ	19	19	14	15	10	DNQ	9	DNQ	50
18	(Denmark) Matti Jørgensen	GASGAS	DNQ	13	14	17	DNQ	19	21	DNQ	DNQ		26
19	(United States) Maxwell Sanford	Honda	DNQ	12									25
19	(United States) Maxwell Sanford	Kawasaki			17	21	18	21	DNQ	DNQ	18	DNQ	25
20	(United States) TJ Albright	Yamaha	16	DNQ	20	DNQ	17	18	DNQ	DNQ	17	DNQ	22
21	(United States) Max Vohland	Kawasaki	5	19									20
22	(United States) Michael Mosiman	Yamaha						6	18				20
23	(United States) Max Miller	Suzuki	DNQ	DNQ	DNQ	16	15	DNQ	17	DNQ	Ret	20	20
24	(United States) Lux Turner	KTM	20					17	22	DNQ	12	DNQ	17
25	(Australia) Geran Stapleton	Kawasaki	DNQ	16	DNQ	DNQ		DNQ	19	DNQ	15	DNQ	16
26	(United States) Slade Varola	Kawasaki	DNQ	14	DNQ	20	DNQ	DNQ	DNQ	DNQ	DNQ	DNQ	10
27	(United States) Lance Kobusch	Honda	17	DNQ	18	DNQ							9
28	(United States) Devin Simonson	Yamaha							14				8
29	(United States) Deegan Hepp	Honda		17	DNQ	DNQ			DNQ	DNQ	DNQ		5
30	(Canada) Julien Benek	Kawasaki	19	DNQ				DNQ			DNQ	DNQ	3
31	(United States) Preston Taylor	Kawasaki							DNQ		19	DNQ	3
32	(United States) Billy Laninovich	Yamaha	DNQ	DNQ	DNQ	22	19				DNQ		3
33	(United States) Carter Stephenson	KTM									20		2
34	(Canada) Guillaume St-Cyr	KTM	DNQ	DNQ	DNQ	DNQ	20	DNQ	DNQ				2
35	(United States) Ty Freehill	Yamaha		20	DNQ		DNQ	DNQ					2
36	(Australia) Brad West	Yamaha						DNQ	DNQ		21	DNQ	1
37	(United States) Blaine Silveira	Suzuki	DNQ	DNQ	DNQ	DNQ	21	DNQ			DNQ		1
38	(United States) Alexander Nagy	KTM	DNQ	DNQ	21	DNQ	DNQ		DNQ		DNQ		1
	(New Zealand) Dylan Walsh	Kawasaki	DNQ					22					0
	(United States) Kyle Wise	Kawasaki	DNQ	DNQ	DNQ	DNQ	DNQ	DNQ		DNQ	DNQ	DNQ	0
	(United States) Robert Hailey	Yamaha		DNQ	DNQ	DNQ	DNQ	DNQ	DNQ	DNQ	DNQ	DNQ	0
	(United States) Chad Saultz	KTM		DNQ	DNQ	DNQ	DNQ	DNQ	DNQ	DNQ	DNQ	DNQ	0
	(United States) Addison Emory IV	Yamaha	DNQ	DNQ	DNQ	DNQ	DNQ	DNQ	DNQ	DNQ			0
	(United States) Josh Greco	GASGAS	DNQ	DNQ	DNQ	DNQ	DNQ		DNQ		DNQ	DNQ	0
	(United States) Carter Biese	Kawasaki	DNQ	DNQ	DNQ	DNQ	DNQ	DNQ	DNQ				0
	(United States) Hunter Calle	Kawasaki	DNQ	DNQ	DNQ	DNQ	DNQ	DNQ	DNQ				0
	(Mexico) Tre Fierro	GASGAS	DNQ	DNQ	DNQ	DNQ	DNQ	DNQ			DNQ		0
	(United States) Doc Smith	GASGAS	DNQ	DNQ	DNQ	DNQ	DNQ		DNQ		DNQ		0
	(United States) Joe Desimone	Kawasaki	DNQ	DNQ	DNQ	DNQ	DNQ	DNQ					0
	(United States) Chris Howell	Yamaha		DNQ	DNQ	DNQ	DNQ	DNQ			DNQ		0
	(United States) Austin Cozadd	Kawasaki			DNQ	DNQ	DNQ	DNQ	DNQ		DNQ		0
	(United States) Braden Spangle	Yamaha	DNQ	DNQ	DNQ		DNQ	DNQ					0
	(United States) Ragan Cochran	GASGAS			DNQ	DNQ	DNQ		DNQ		DNQ		0
	(United States) Ryan Carlson	Kawasaki		DNQ	DNQ		DNQ				DNQ		0
	(United States) Nicholas Nisbet	Honda					DNQ	DNQ			DNQ	DNQ	0
	(United States) Kile Epperson	Honda						DNQ	DNQ	DNQ	DNQ		0
	(Australia) Travis Olander	Kawasaki	DNQ			DNQ							0
	(United States) Blake Gardner	Kawasaki						DNQ	DNQ				0
	(United States) Rider Fisher	Kawasaki						DNQ			DNQ		0
	(United States) Brandon Marley	Yamaha							DNQ	DNQ			0
	(Canada) Noah Viney	Honda									DNQ	DNQ	0
	(United States) Colin Jurin	Yamaha						DNQ					0
	(United States) Cheyenne Harmon	Yamaha							DNQ				0
	(United States) Bracken Hall	Kawasaki									DNQ		0
	(United States) Mike Henderson	Kawasaki									DNQ		0
Pos	Rider	Bike	ANA (California)	SFR (California)	SDI (California)	ANA (California)	GLE (Arizona)	SEA (Washington (state))	STL (Missouri)	NAS (Tennessee)	DEN (Colorado)	SLC (Utah)	Points

== 250 SX East ==
=== Entry list ===
Team	Constructor	No	Rider	Rounds
Muc-Off FXR ClubMX Yamaha Racing	Yamaha	6	(United States) Jeremy Martin	1, 3–5
Muc-Off FXR ClubMX Yamaha Racing	Yamaha	69	(United States) Coty Schock	All
Muc-Off FXR ClubMX Yamaha Racing	Yamaha	99	(United States) Jett Reynolds	1
Red Bull KTM Factory Racing USA	KTM	16	(France) Tom Vialle	All
Triumph Racing	Triumph	33	(United States) Jalek Swoll	All
Triumph Racing	Triumph	751	(United States) Evan Ferry	1
Fire Power Honda Racing	Honda	37	(United Kingdom) Max Anstie	All
Monster Energy Star Racing Yamaha	Yamaha	38	(United States) Haiden Deegan	All
Monster Energy Star Racing Yamaha	Yamaha	50	(Brazil) Enzo Lopes	
Monster Energy Star Racing Yamaha	Yamaha	59	(United States) Daxton Bennick	All
Monster Energy Star Racing Yamaha	Yamaha	61	(United States) Stilez Robertson	
Monster Energy Star Racing Yamaha	Yamaha	511	(United States) Nick Romano	All
Troy Lee Designs Red Bull Gas Gas Factory Racing	GASGAS	39	(United States) Pierce Brown	All
Toyota Redlands BARX Suzuki	Suzuki	40	(United States) Dilan Schwartz	
Toyota Redlands BARX Suzuki	Suzuki	128	(United States) Preston Boespflug	All
Monster Energy Pro Circuit Kawasaki	Kawasaki	43	(United States) Seth Hammaker	1–6, 8–9
Monster Energy Pro Circuit Kawasaki	Kawasaki	63	(United States) Cameron McAdoo	1–7
Monster Energy Pro Circuit Kawasaki	Kawasaki	64	(United States) Austin Forkner	1–2
Team Honda HRC	Honda	48	(United States) Chance Hymas	All
Valley Automotive Group	Honda	56	(United States) Jeremy Hand	5
Phoenix Racing Honda	Honda	58	(United States) Cullin Park	1
Phoenix Racing Honda	Honda	408	(United States) Kyle Peters	8
Wildcat Race Team	GASGAS	60	(Venezuela) Lorenzo Locurcio	1–3, 6–9
Wildcat Race Team	GASGAS	526	(United States) Nicholas Laurie	1, 3–6, 8–9
TiLube Honda Racing	Honda	65	(United States) Henry Miller	All
TiLube Honda Racing	Honda	86	(United States) Luca Marsalisi	1–8
TiLube Honda Racing	Honda	174	(United States) Trevor Colip	1, 5–7
TiLube Honda Racing	Honda	296	(United States) Ryder Floyd	All
Gizmo Mods Rock River Yamaha Racing	Yamaha	75	(United States) Marshal Weltin	All
Gizmo Mods Rock River Yamaha Racing	Yamaha	80	(United States) Michael Hicks	2–3
Gizmo Mods Rock River Yamaha Racing	Yamaha	900	(United States) Keegan Rowley	1–8
FXR/Grassroots MX/EVS	Yamaha	77	(United States) Preston Kilroy	2–5
Rockstar Energy Husqvarna Factory Racing	Husqvarna	83	(Spain) Guillem Farrés	1–2
Rockstar Energy Husqvarna Factory Racing	Husqvarna	166	(United States) Casey Cochran	6–8
Red Research Group	Yamaha	89	(United States) Luke Neese	5
HBI Racing Kawasaki	Kawasaki	90	(Chile) Hardy Muñoz	All
HBI Racing Kawasaki	Kawasaki	137	(United States) Ayden Shive	1–6, 8
HBI Racing Kawasaki	Kawasaki	427	(United States) Cole Bradford	1–6, 8
Kessler Concrete ATeam RevX Yamaha	Yamaha	92	(United States) Jace Kessler	2–5, 7–8
The Dirt Bike Depot Racing Team	Yamaha	93	(United States) Bryce Shelly	1–8
The Dirt Bike Depot Racing Team	Kawasaki	208	(United States) Logan Leitzel	1–8
The Dirt Bike Depot Racing Team	KTM	435	(South Africa) Marcus Phelps	1–8
The Dirt Bike Depot Racing Team	GASGAS	602	(United States) Gage Linville	All
CREO KTM	KTM	108	(Estonia) Jörgen-Matthias Talviku	2–8
CREO KTM	KTM	221	(Canada) Tyler Gibbs	2–5
CREO KTM	KTM	223	(United States) Dawson Kaub	3–8
CREO KTM	KTM	667	(Sweden) Anton Nordström Graaf	6–7
The Privateer Paddock	Kawasaki	667	(Sweden) Anton Nordström Graaf	3–5
TPJ Fly Racing Team	Kawasaki	119	(United States) Logan Boye	1–2, 4–8
TPJ Fly Racing Team	KTM	197	(United States) Brian Saunier	All
TPJ Fly Racing Team	Yamaha	242	(United States) Garrett Hoffman	1–8
TPJ Fly Racing Team	Husqvarna	420	(United States) Jackson Gray	1–9
TPJ Fly Racing Team	KTM	504	(Honduras) Gerhard Matamoros	1–4, 6–7
Team Hawkey Racing	Kawasaki	130	(United States) Kyler Hawkey	2–4
DPMX OnlyFans Racing Yamaha	Yamaha	138	(United States) David Pulley Jr.	1–7, 9
EMT Racing	Honda	159	(United States) Tyson Johnson	
Team LMR	Honda	177	(United States) Tyler Stepek	1–3, 6
Morgantown Powersports	Yamaha	183	(United States) Mitchell Zaremba	1–8
	Yamaha	212	(United States) Levi Kilbarger	5
Mech Co Scrubndirt Fitfo	KTM	239	(United States) Bryson Raymond	2–3, 6
Namura/Automatic Distributors/Invictus Speed Crew	Husqvarna	247	(United States) Brock Papi	2–6
Lynn Well Service Jones Racing	Honda	253	(United States) Nick Jones	2, 4–9
Fredericktown Yamaha	Yamaha	268	(United States) Gage Stine	1–3, 5, 8
CKB Racing	KTM	280	(United States) Jack Beeland	2–8
Carsten Racing	Suzuki	281	(United States) Cory Carsten	1–6, 8
Sofa Brand MX BWR Engines	Honda	299	(United States) Konnor Visger	1–8
CCEX/CCR MP1	Yamaha	303	(United States) Nate Mason	8
The Shoals	Suzuki	315	(United States) Cody Groves	3
Parts Unlimited CycleWorx Suspension	KTM	337	(South Africa) Slade Smith	3–5
Galaxy Cloaking	GASGAS	346	(United States) Charles Tolleson	2–5
Western Transportation Group	Kawasaki	351	(United States) Jack Rogers	1–6, 8
GMC 3500	KTM	372	(United States) Hayden Hefner	2–3, 7
O'Neal Racing Dirt Tricks	KTM	376	(United States) Thomas Welch	1–3, 5–8
EBR Ajacks Husqvarna	Husqvarna	413	(United States) Crockett Myers	6–8
Rutted Racing	KTM	414	(United States) Mason Morris	1, 3–4
Triangle Cycles	Yamaha	428	(United States) Chad Stonier	1–6, 8
Luhovey Racing	Honda	437	(United States) Vincent Luhovey	1, 3–6, 8
TCD	Yamaha	483	(United States) Bryton Carroll	1–6, 8
Randanella Septic VPE	Kawasaki	489	(United States) Ricci Randanella	6, 8
CCR OGs Optics	Yamaha	573	(United States) Christopher Blackmer	1, 3, 5, 8
Lasting Impressions CG LLC	Honda	581	(United States) Kyle Bitterman	3
Lasting Impressions CG LLC	Honda	682	(United States) Izaih Clark	2–3, 5–8
C.C Construction FTP Maintenance	Kawasaki	689	(United States) Tony Usko	3–5
Team Sakai Racing	Yamaha	690	(United States) Michael McLing	4, 7
Rides Unlimited Rocky Mountain ATV MC Racing	KTM	702	(United States) Hunter Cross	1–2, 4–5
Tech Service Race Team	Yamaha	777	(United States) James Harrington	3, 6
TJs Cycle/812 Suspension Design	KTM	812	(United States) Luke Dickey	2–4, 8
Duke Cycles	GASGAS	822	(United States) Riley Ripper	2–3
Limited Decal LGC Wheels	KTM	831	(United States) Jacob Glenn	1, 3–4, 6
RRR/Crystal Rounds/Hollywood Grafx	Husqvarna	878	(United States) Eric McKay	3, 8
Motosport Hillsboro	KTM	916	(United States) Devin Harriman	3
Partzilla PRMX Kawasaki	Kawasaki	964	(Germany) Dominique Thury	1–6, 8–9

=== Championship Standings ===
Pos	Rider	Bike	DET (Michigan)	ARL (Texas)	DAY (Florida)	BIR (Alabama)	IND (Indiana)	FOX (Massachusetts)	NAS (Tennessee)	PHI (Pennsylvania)	SLC (Utah)	Points
1	(France) Tom Vialle	KTM	18	3	1	1	2	3	3	2	8	172
2	(United States) Haiden Deegan	Yamaha	16	1	4	9	3	1	6	3	1	168
3	(United States) Coty Schock	Yamaha	4	8	6	8	5	6	12	6	11	132
4	(United States) Pierce Brown	GASGAS	5	5	5	4	4	4	11	14	12	131
5	(United Kingdom) Max Anstie	Honda	2	6	8	21	13	5	7	1	16	125
6	(United States) Cameron McAdoo	Kawasaki	15	2	2	2	1	2	Ret			120
7	(United States) Jalek Swoll	Triumph	6	Ret	7	6	11	8	5	8	9	116
8	(United States) Chance Hymas	Honda	10	7	15	10	8	12	8	5	7	116
9	(United States) Daxton Bennick	Yamaha	3	10	10	7	10	7	20	4	17	111
10	(United States) Seth Hammaker	Kawasaki	21	4	3	3	9	Ret		7	14	95
11	(United States) Henry Miller	Honda	7	11	11	11	12	10	18	13	DNQ	83
12	(United States) Marshal Weltin	Yamaha	9	13	9	12	14	9	DNQ	18	DNQ	70
13	(United States) Nick Romano	Yamaha	14	12	13	DNQ	6	11	DNQ	10	19	69
14	(United States) Jeremy Martin	Yamaha	DNQ		12	5	7					52
15	(United States) Preston Boespflug	Suzuki	13	DNQ	DNQ	15	21	13	DNQ	9	21	40
16	(United States) Gage Linville	GASGAS	17	15	18	16	DNQ	17	21	11	DNQ	39
17	(United States) Austin Forkner	Kawasaki	1	20								27
17	(Spain) Guillem Farrés	Husqvarna	8	9								27
19	(United States) Trevor Colip	Honda	11				18	14	DNQ			23
20	(Chile) Hardy Muñoz	Kawasaki	DNQ	21	DNQ	13	17	DNQ	DNQ	15	DNQ	22
21	(United States) Ryder Floyd	Honda	DNQ	16	DNQ	18	16	DNQ	DNQ	16	DNQ	22
22	(United States) Casey Cochran	Husqvarna						15	15	17		19
23	(United States) Bryton Carroll	Yamaha	19	DNQ	16	14	DNQ	DNQ		22		17
24	(United States) Luca Marsalisi	Honda	12	DNQ	DNQ	DNQ	DNQ	18	DNQ	DNQ		14
25	(United States) Bryce Shelly	Yamaha	DNQ	DNQ	DNQ	17	DNQ	16	DNQ	DNQ		11
26	(United States) Kyle Peters	Honda								12		10
27	(United States) Izaih Clark	Honda		17	17		DNQ	DNQ	DNQ	DNQ		10
28	(United States) Jace Kessler	Yamaha		DNQ	14	DNQ	DNQ		DNQ	DNQ		8
29	(Venezuela) Lorenzo Locurcio	GASGAS	DNQ	14	22			DNQ	DNQ	DNQ	DNQ	8
30	(United States) Jeremy Hand	Honda					15					7
31	(United States) Brock Papi	Husqvarna		19	DNQ	DNQ	19	DNQ				6
32	(South Africa) Marcus Phelps	KTM	DNQ	DNQ	DNQ	20	DNQ	DNQ	DNQ	19		5
33	(United States) Logan Leitzel	Kawasaki	DNQ	DNQ	DNQ	19	DNQ	20	DNQ	DNQ		5
34	(United States) Michael Hicks	Yamaha		18	DNQ							4
35	(United States) Vincent Luhovey	Honda	DNQ		DNQ	DNQ	DNQ	19		21		4
36	(United States) Tyler Stepek	Honda	DNQ	DNQ	19			DNQ				3
37	(United States) Cullin Park	Honda	20									2
38	(United States) Levi Kilbarger	Yamaha					20					2
39	(United States) Crockett Myers	Husqvarna						DNQ	DNQ	20		2
40	(Germany) Dominique Thury	Kawasaki	DNQ	DNQ	20	Ret	DNQ	DNQ		DNQ	DNQ	2
41	(United States) Thomas Welch	KTM	DNQ	DNQ	DNQ	DNQ	DNQ	21	DNQ	DNQ		1
42	(United States) Garrett Hoffman	Yamaha	DNQ	DNQ	21	DNQ	DNQ	DNQ	DNQ	DNQ		1
	(United States) Luke Neese	Yamaha					22					0
	(United States) Evan Ferry	Triumph	Ret									0
	(United States) Jackson Gray	Husqvarna	DNQ	DNQ	DNQ	DNQ	DNQ	DNQ	DNQ	DNQ	DNQ	0
	(United States) Brian Saunier	KTM	DNQ	DNQ	DNQ	DNQ	DNQ	DNQ	DNQ	DNQ	DNQ	0
	(United States) Mitchell Zaremba	Yamaha	DNQ	DNQ	DNQ	DNQ	DNQ	DNQ	DNQ	DNQ		0
	(United States) Keegan Rowley	Yamaha	DNQ	DNQ	DNQ	DNQ	DNQ	DNQ	DNQ	DNQ		0
	(United States) Konnor Visger	Honda	DNQ	DNQ	DNQ	DNQ	DNQ	DNQ	DNQ	DNQ		0
	(United States) David Pulley Jr.	Yamaha	DNQ	DNQ	DNQ	DNQ	DNQ	DNQ	DNQ		DNQ	0
	(United States) Ayden Shive	Kawasaki	DNQ	DNQ	DNQ	DNQ	DNQ	DNQ		DNQ		0
	(United States) Jack Rogers	Kawasaki	DNQ	DNQ	DNQ	DNQ	DNQ	DNQ		DNQ		0
	(United States) Cory Carsten	Suzuki	DNQ	DNQ	DNQ	DNQ	DNQ	DNQ		DNQ		0
	(United States) Cole Bradford	Kawasaki	DNQ	DNQ	DNQ	DNQ	DNQ	DNQ		DNQ		0
	(United States) Chad Stonier	Yamaha	DNQ	DNQ	DNQ	DNQ	DNQ	DNQ		DNQ		0
	(United States) Logan Boye	Kawasaki	DNQ	DNQ		DNQ	DNQ	DNQ	DNQ	DNQ		0
	(United States) Nicholas Laurie	GASGAS	DNQ		DNQ	DNQ	DNQ	DNQ		DNQ	DNQ	0
	(Estonia) Jörgen-Matthias Talviku	KTM		DNQ	DNQ	DNQ	DNQ	DNQ	DNQ	DNQ		0
	(United States) Jack Beeland	KTM		DNQ	DNQ	DNQ	DNQ	DNQ	DNQ	DNQ		0
	(United States) Nick Jones	Honda		DNQ		DNQ	DNQ	DNQ	DNQ	DNQ	DNQ	0
	(Honduras) Gerhard Matamoros	KTM	DNQ	DNQ	DNQ	DNQ		DNQ	DNQ			0
	(United States) Dawson Kaub	KTM			DNQ	DNQ	DNQ	DNQ	DNQ	DNQ		0
	(United States) Gage Stine	Yamaha	DNQ	DNQ	DNQ		DNQ			DNQ		0
	(Sweden) Anton Nordström Graaf	Kawasaki			DNQ	DNQ	DNQ					0
	(Sweden) Anton Nordström Graaf	KTM						DNQ	DNQ			0
	(United States) Hunter Cross	KTM	DNQ	DNQ		DNQ	DNQ					0
	(United States) Jacob Glenn	KTM	DNQ		DNQ	DNQ		DNQ				0
	(United States) Christopher Blackmer	Yamaha	DNQ		DNQ		DNQ			DNQ		0
	(United States) Preston Kilroy	Yamaha		DNQ	DNQ	DNQ	DNQ					0
	(Canada) Tyler Gibbs	KTM		DNQ	DNQ	DNQ	DNQ					0
	(United States) Charles Tolleson	GASGAS		DNQ	DNQ	DNQ	DNQ					0
	(United States) Luke Dickey	KTM		DNQ	DNQ	DNQ				DNQ		0
	(United States) Mason Morris	KTM	DNQ		DNQ	DNQ						0
	(United States) Kyler Hawkey	Kawasaki		DNQ	DNQ	DNQ						0
	(United States) Bryson Raymond	KTM		DNQ	DNQ			DNQ				0
	(United States) Hayden Hefner	KTM		DNQ	DNQ				DNQ			0
	(South Africa) Slade Smith	KTM			DNQ	DNQ	DNQ					0
	(United States) Tony Usko	Kawasaki			DNQ	DNQ	DNQ					0
	(United States) Riley Ripper	GASGAS		DNQ	DNQ							0
	(United States) James Harrington	Yamaha			DNQ			DNQ				0
	(United States) Eric McKay	Husqvarna			DNQ					DNQ		0
	(United States) Michael McLing	Yamaha				DNQ			DNQ			0
	(United States) Ricci Randanella	Kawasaki						DNQ		DNQ		0
	(United States) Jett Reynolds	Yamaha	DNQ									0
	(United States) Kyle Bitterman	Honda			DNQ							0
	(United States) Cody Groves	Suzuki			DNQ							0
	(United States) Devin Harriman	KTM			DNQ							0
	(United States) Nate Mason	Yamaha								DNQ		0
Pos	Rider	Bike	DET (Michigan)	ARL (Texas)	DAY (Florida)	BIR (Alabama)	IND (Indiana)	FOX (Massachusetts)	NAS (Tennessee)	PHI (Pennsylvania)	SLC (Utah)	Points
