= 2024 SuperMotocross World Championship =

Motorcycle racing competition

The 2024 SuperMotocross World Championship was the second edition of the premier combined discipline off-road motorcycle racing competition, held in the United States. Combining the AMA Supercross Championship and the AMA Motocross Championship, along with three final SuperMotocross rounds, the total length of the series ran from January to September.

Jett Lawrence went into the season as the reigning overall champion in the 450cc class, whilst Haiden Deegan began the campaign as the defending champion in the 250cc class.

== 2024 AMA Supercross Championship ==
2024 AMA Supercross Championship
- Organizer: American Motorcyclist Association, Feld Entertainment (except Daytona), NASCAR Holdings, Inc. (Daytona)
- Discipline: Supercross
- Duration: January – May 2024
- Number of races: 17
- TV partners: NBC Sports (NBC, USA Network, CNBC, Peacock)

Seasons
- ← 2023 2025 →

The 2024 AMA Supercross Championship is the 51st season of off-road stadium motorcycle racing in the United States. Comprising 17 rounds, the series will run from January until May, crowning supercross champions in both the 250cc and 450cc classes, concluding with the Salt Lake City round on May 11.

2024 Monster Energy AMA Supercross Championship
Round (250 East/West)	Date	Location	Stadium	Broadcast	450cc Winner	250cc Winner
1 (W)	January 6	(California) Anaheim	Angel Stadium	Peacock, USA (live), NBC (delay)	(Australia) Jett Lawrence (1)	(United States) RJ Hampshire (1)
2 (W)	January 13	(California) San Francisco	Oracle Park	Peacock (live), NBC (delay)	(United States) Chase Sexton (1)	(United States) Jordon Smith (1)
3 (W)	January 20	(California) San Diego	Snapdragon Stadium	Peacock (live)	(United States) Aaron Plessinger (1)	(United States) Nate Thrasher (1)
4 (W) Triple Crown	January 27	(California) Anaheim 2	Angel Stadium	Peacock (live)	(United States) Cooper Webb (1)	(United States) Levi Kitchen (1)
5 (E)	February 3	(Michigan) Detroit	Ford Field	Peacock, NBC (live)	(Australia) Jett Lawrence (2)	(United States) Austin Forkner (1)
6 (W)	February 10	(Arizona) Glendale	State Farm Stadium	Peacock (live)	(Germany) Ken Roczen (1)	(United States) RJ Hampshire (2)
7 (E)	February 24	(Texas) Arlington	AT&T Stadium	Peacock (live)	(United States) Cooper Webb (2)	(United States) Haiden Deegan (1)
8 (E)	March 2	(Florida) Daytona	Daytona International Speedway	Peacock (live)	(Australia) Jett Lawrence (3)	(France) Tom Vialle (1)
9 (E)	March 9	(Alabama) Birmingham	Protective Stadium	Peacock (live)	(Australia) Jett Lawrence (4)	(France) Tom Vialle (2)
10 (E) Triple Crown	March 16	(Indiana) Indianapolis	Lucas Oil Stadium	Peacock (live)	(Australia) Jett Lawrence (5)	(United States) Cameron McAdoo (1)
11 (W)	March 23	(Washington (state)) Seattle	Lumen Field	Peacock (live)	(United States) Cooper Webb (3)	(United States) Levi Kitchen (2)
12 (W) Triple Crown	March 30	(Missouri) St. Louis	The Dome at America's Center	Peacock (live)	(United States) Eli Tomac (1)	(United States) Levi Kitchen (3)
13 (E)	April 13	(Massachusetts) Foxborough	Gillette Stadium	Peacock (live)	(United States) Cooper Webb (4)	(United States) Haiden Deegan (2)
14 (E/W)	April 20	(Tennessee) Nashville	Nissan Stadium	Peacock (live)	(Australia) Jett Lawrence (6)	(United States) RJ Hampshire (3)
15 (E)	April 27	(Pennsylvania) Philadelphia	Lincoln Financial Field	Peacock, NBC (live)	(Australia) Jett Lawrence (7)	(United Kingdom) Max Anstie (1)
16 (W)	May 4	(Colorado) Denver	Empower Field at Mile High	Peacock (live), NBC (delay)	(Australia) Jett Lawrence (8)	(Japan) Jo Shimoda (1)
17 (E/W)	May 11	(Utah) Salt Lake City	Rice-Eccles Stadium	Peacock, USA (live), NBC (delay)	(United States) Chase Sexton (2)	(United States) Haiden Deegan (3)

=== Stadium locations ===
2023 AMA Supercross Championship locations

== 2024 AMA Motocross Championship ==
2024 AMA Motocross Championship
- Organizer: American Motorcyclist Association
- Discipline: Motocross
- Duration: May – August 2024
- Number of races: 11
- TV partners: NBC Sports (NBC, USA Network, CNBC, Peacock)

The 2024 AMA Motocross Championship was the 53rd season of the premier off-road motocross racing series in the United States. Comprising eleven rounds across three months from late May until August, the series crowned champions in both 250cc and 450cc classes.

2024 Lucas Oil Pro Motocross Championship
Round	Date	Event	Racetrack	Broadcast	250cc Winner	450cc Winner
1	May 25	(California) Fox Raceway National	Fox Raceway	Peacock (live)	(United States) Haiden Deegan	(Australia) Jett Lawrence
2	June 1	(California) Hangtown Classic	Hangtown	Peacock (live)	(United States) Haiden Deegan	(United States) Chase Sexton
3	June 8	(Colorado) Thunder Valley National	Thunder Valley	Peacock, NBC (live)	(United States) Haiden Deegan	(Australia) Jett Lawrence
4	June 15	(Pennsylvania) High Point National	High Point	Peacock (live), USA (delay)	(United States) Ty Masterpool	(Australia) Jett Lawrence
5	June 29	(Massachusetts) Southwick National	Southwick MX	Peacock (live)	(United States) Haiden Deegan	(Australia) Jett Lawrence
6	July 6	(Michigan) Red Bud National	RedBud	Peacock, NBC (live)	(United States) Chance Hymas	(United States) Chase Sexton
7	July 13	(Minnesota) Spring Creek National	Spring Creek	Peacock, NBC (live)	(United States) Levi Kitchen	(United States) Chase Sexton
8	July 20	(Washington (state)) Washougal National	Washougal MX	Peacock, NBC (live)	(United States) Haiden Deegan	(United States) Chase Sexton
9	August 10	(New York (state)) Unadilla National	Unadilla	Peacock (live)	(United States) Levi Kitchen	(United States) Chase Sexton
10	August 17	(Maryland) Budds Creek National	Budds Creek MX	Peacock (live), USA (delay)	(United States) Levi Kitchen	(United States) Chase Sexton
11	August 24	(Indiana) Ironman National	Ironman MX	Peacock (live)	(France) Tom Vialle	(United States) Chase Sexton

== 2024 SuperMotocross World Championship ==
2024 SuperMotocross World Championship
- Organizer: American Motorcyclist Association
- Discipline: Supercross and Motocross
- Duration: September 2024
- Number of races: 3
- TV partners: NBC Sports (NBC, USA Network, CNBC, Peacock)

Seasons
- ← 2023 2025 →

The 2024 SuperMotocross World Championship was the second season of the premier worldwide off-road motorcycle racing series, held in the United States. Combining the results of the 17 AMA Supercross Championship rounds and 11 AMA Motocross Championship events, the series comprised 31 rounds in total, with three dedicated SuperMotocross rounds that determined the overall champion of AMA off-road motorcycle racing for the season.

2024 SuperMotocross World Championship
Round	Date	Location	Stadium	Broadcast	250cc Winner	450cc Winner
1	September 7	Concord, NC	zMAX Dragway	Peacock (live); NBC (delay)	(United States) Haiden Deegan	(Australia) Jett Lawrence
2	September 14	Fort Worth, TX	Texas Motor Speedway	Peacock (live); USA (delay)	(United States) Haiden Deegan	(Australia) Hunter Lawrence
3	September 21	Las Vegas, NV	The Strip at Las Vegas Motor Speedway	Peacock (live); NBC (delay)	(United States) Pierce Brown	(Australia) Jett Lawrence

== 450SMX ==
The top 20 riders from the combined standings of the 2024 AMA Supercross Championship and the 2024 AMA National Motocross Championship automatically qualify and are seeded into each round of the SuperMotocross World Championship.

Riders from 21st-30th in the combined standings will compete in the Last Chance Qualifier in each event, with the top 2 from this competing in the main events with the seeded riders. The LCQ is also open to riders who won a supercross main event or motocross moto if they did not finish inside the top 30. If a seeded top 20 rider is unable to compete in an event, an additional opportunity to qualify will be given to riders in the LCQ.

=== Entry list ===
Seeded Riders
Qualified Position	Team	Constructor	No	Rider	Rounds
6th	Team Honda HRC Progressive	Honda	1	(Australia) Jett Lawrence	All
2nd	Team Honda HRC Progressive	Honda	96	(Australia) Hunter Lawrence	All
10th	Monster Energy Yamaha Star Racing	Yamaha	2	(United States) Cooper Webb	All
11th	Monster Energy Yamaha Star Racing	Yamaha	3	(United States) Eli Tomac	All
5th	Monster Energy Yamaha Star Racing	Yamaha	32	(United States) Justin Cooper	All
1st	Red Bull KTM Factory Racing	KTM	4	(United States) Chase Sexton	All
4th	Red Bull KTM Factory Racing	KTM	7	(United States) Aaron Plessinger	All
20th	Twisted Tea Suzuki	Suzuki	11	(United States) Kyle Chisholm	All
14th	Maddparts.com MX4Christ Galaxy Cloaking Kawasaki	Kawasaki	12	(United States) Shane McElrath	All
15th	Maddparts.com MX4Christ Galaxy Cloaking Kawasaki	Kawasaki	22	(Sweden) Fredrik Norén	All
8th	Phoenix Racing Honda	Honda	14	(France) Dylan Ferrandis	All
3rd	Monster Energy Kawasaki	Kawasaki	21	(United States) Jason Anderson	All
19th	Gizmo Mods Rock River Racing Yamaha	Yamaha	23	(United States) Grant Harlan	All
18th	Gizmo Mods Rock River Racing Yamaha	Yamaha	75	(United States) Marshal Weltin	All
7th	Rockstar Energy Husqvarna Factory Racing	Husqvarna	27	(United States) Malcolm Stewart	All
12th	Rockstar Energy Husqvarna Factory Racing	Husqvarna	28	(United States) Christian Craig	All
16th	Muc-Off FXR ClubMX Yamaha	Yamaha	36	(United States) Phil Nicoletti	All
9th	Troy Lee Designs Red Bull Gas Gas	Gas Gas	51	(United States) Justin Barcia	All
17th	Michael's Reno Powersports	KTM	79	(Estonia) Harri Kullas	All
13th	Progressive Insurance ECSTAR Suzuki	Suzuki	94	(Germany) Ken Roczen	All
LCQ Riders
Qualified Position	Team	Constructor	No	Rider	Rounds
21st	Fire Power Honda Racing	Honda	15	(United Kingdom) Dean Wilson	All
28th	Twisted Tea Suzuki	Suzuki	45	(United States) Colt Nichols	All
22nd	Team Tedder Monster Energy KTM	KTM	46	(United States) Justin Hill	1
26th	AEO Powersports KTM Racing	KTM	53	(United States) Derek Kelley	1–2
34th	Valley Automotive Group/Dean Hushon Insulation/Oneal	Honda	56	(United States) Jeremy Hand	All
27th	Phoenix Racing Honda	Honda	58	(United States) Cullin Park	All
23rd	TPJ Racing	Gas Gas	68	(France) Romain Pape	All
37th	TruLine Corp Estenson Racing Yamaha	Yamaha	70	(United States) Jerry Robin	All
38th	Partzilla PRMX Racing Kawasaki	Kawasaki	81	(United States) Cade Clason	All
36th	Rides Unlimited KTM	KTM	84	(Venezuela) Anthony Rodríguez	2

=== Riders Championship ===
Pos	Rider	Bike	Points Reset	CON (North Carolina)	FOR (Texas)	LVE (Nevada)	Points
1	(Australia) Jett Lawrence	Honda	16	1	3	1	156
2	(Australia) Hunter Lawrence	Honda	22	4	1	2	156
3	(United States) Eli Tomac	Yamaha	11	2	4	3	129
4	(United States) Aaron Plessinger	KTM	18	8	7	4	116
5	(United States) Cooper Webb	Yamaha	12	10	5	5	109
6	(Germany) Ken Roczen	Suzuki	9	5	6	7	103
7	(United States) Chase Sexton	KTM	25	3	2	24	89
8	(United States) Justin Cooper	Yamaha	17	6	23	6	81
9	(United States) Justin Barcia	Gas Gas	13	DNS	12	8	75
10	(United States) Jason Anderson	Kawasaki	20	DNS	8	13	75
11	(France) Dylan Ferrandis	Honda	14	11	9	14	75
12	(United States) Shane McElrath	Kawasaki	8	13	15	10	67
13	(Estonia) Harri Kullas	KTM	5	19	17	9	57
14	(United States) Colt Nichols	Suzuki		9	10	17	52
15	(United States) Marshal Weltin	Yamaha	4	12	18	12	52
16	(Sweden) Fredrik Norén	Kawasaki	7	15	20	11	51
17	(United States) Malcolm Stewart	Husqvarna	15	7	13	23	48
18	(United Kingdom) Dean Wilson	Honda		20	11	16	42
19	(United States) Grant Harlan	Yamaha	3	16	19	15	36
20	(United States) Christian Craig	Husqvarna	10	14	14	22	34
21	(United States) Phil Nicoletti	Yamaha	6	17	21	18	25
22	(United States) Kyle Chisholm	Suzuki	2	21	16	20	21
23	(United States) Jerry Robin	Yamaha		18	22	19	13
24	(United States) Cullin Park	Honda		DNQ	DNQ	21	3
25	(United States) Justin Hill	KTM		22			0
	(France) Romain Pape	Gas Gas		DNQ	DNQ	DNQ	0
	(United States) Jeremy Hand	Honda		DNQ	DNQ	DNQ	0
	(United States) Cade Clason	Kawasaki		DNQ	DNQ	DNQ	0
	(United States) Derek Kelley	KTM		DNQ	DNQ		0
	(Venezuela) Anthony Rodríguez	KTM			DNQ		0
Pos	Rider	Bike	Points Reset	CON (North Carolina)	FOR (Texas)	LVE (Nevada)	Points

== 250SMX ==
The top 20 riders from the combined standings of the 2024 AMA Supercross Championship and the 2024 AMA National Motocross Championship automatically qualify and are seeded into each round of the SuperMotocross World Championship.

Riders from 21st-30th in the combined standings will compete in the Last Chance Qualifier in each event, with the top 2 from this competing in the main events with the seeded riders. The LCQ is also open to riders who won a supercross main event or motocross moto if they did not finish inside the top 30. If a seeded top 20 rider is unable to compete in an event, an additional opportunity to qualify will be given to riders in the LCQ.

=== Entry list ===
Seeded Riders
Qualified Position	Team	Constructor	No	Rider	Rounds
1st	Monster Energy Yamaha Star Racing	Yamaha	1	(United States) Haiden Deegan	All
6th	Monster Energy Yamaha Star Racing	Yamaha	31	(United States) Jordon Smith	All
12th	Monster Energy Yamaha Star Racing	Yamaha	37	(United Kingdom) Max Anstie	All
20th	Monster Energy Yamaha Star Racing	Yamaha	57	(United States) Nate Thrasher	1–2
16th	Monster Energy Yamaha Star Racing	Yamaha	511	(United States) Nick Romano	All
3rd	Red Bull KTM Factory Racing	KTM	16	(France) Tom Vialle	All
9th	Red Bull KTM Factory Racing	KTM	929	(United States) Julien Beaumer	All
13th	Rockstar Energy Husqvarna Factory Racing	Husqvarna	24	(United States) RJ Hampshire	1–2
18th	Rockstar Energy Husqvarna Factory Racing	Husqvarna	166	(United States) Casey Cochran	1
19th	Monster Energy Pro Circuit Kawasaki	Kawasaki	26	(United States) Garrett Marchbanks	All
11th	Monster Energy Pro Circuit Kawasaki	Kawasaki	29	(United States) Ty Masterpool	All
2nd	Monster Energy Pro Circuit Kawasaki	Kawasaki	47	(United States) Levi Kitchen	All
4th	Team Honda HRC Progressive	Honda	30	(Japan) Jo Shimoda	All
5th	Team Honda HRC Progressive	Honda	48	(United States) Chance Hymas	1–2
8th	Triumph Factory Racing	Triumph	33	(United States) Jalek Swoll	1
10th	Troy Lee Designs Red Bull Gas Gas	Gas Gas	34	(United States) Ryder DiFrancesco	All
7th	Troy Lee Designs Red Bull Gas Gas	Gas Gas	39	(United States) Pierce Brown	All
15th	Muc-Off FXR ClubMX Yamaha	Yamaha	69	(United States) Coty Schock	All
LCQ Riders
Qualified Position	Team	Constructor	No	Rider	Rounds
22nd	AEO Powersports KTM Racing	KTM	35	(United States) Talon Hawkins	All
36th	AEO Powersports KTM Racing	KTM	473	(United States) Lux Turner	All
28th	Fire Power Honda Racing	Honda	41	(United States) Carson Mumford	1–2
23rd	Monster Energy Pro Circuit Kawasaki	Kawasaki	63	(United States) Cameron McAdoo	All
30th	Tech Service Racing SLH Honda Racing	Honda	65	(United States) Henry Miller	All
29th	Team Solitaire Heartbeat Hot Sauce Yamaha	Yamaha	71	(Canada) Cole Thompson	1–2
33rd	Team Solitaire Heartbeat Hot Sauce Yamaha	Yamaha	73	(United States) Robbie Wageman	3
26th	Muc-Off FXR ClubMX Yamaha	Yamaha	99	(United States) Jett Reynolds	All
31st	Muc-Off FXR ClubMX Yamaha	Yamaha	705	(United States) Mark Fineis	1
45th	Grindstone Friesen Group	Kawasaki	162	(United States) Max Sanford	2–3
44th	AJE Motorsports	Gas Gas	245	(Denmark) Matti Jørgensen	1–3
49th		Honda	296	(United States) Ryder Floyd	3

=== Riders Championship ===
Pos	Rider	Bike	Points Reset	CON (North Carolina)	FOR (Texas)	LVE (Nevada)	Points
1	(United States) Haiden Deegan	Yamaha	25	1	1	2	166
2	(France) Tom Vialle	KTM	20	5	2	5	132
3	(United States) Pierce Brown	Gas Gas	15	11	7	1	131
4	(Japan) Jo Shimoda	Honda	18	4	3	4	130
5	(United States) Jordon Smith	Yamaha	16	6	6	3	124
6	(United States) Levi Kitchen	Kawasaki	22	3	4	8	120
7	(United States) Julien Beaumer	KTM	13	2	5	9	108
8	(United Kingdom) Max Anstie	Yamaha	10	7	10	6	97
9	(United States) Ty Masterpool	Kawasaki	11	12	11	7	88
10	(United States) Cameron McAdoo	Kawasaki		8	8	12	72
11	(United States) Ryder DiFrancesco	Gas Gas	12	13	13	11	72
12	(United States) Garrett Marchbanks	Kawasaki	3	10	12	10	71
13	(United States) Nick Romano	Yamaha	6	14	9	18	52
14	(United States) Coty Schock	Yamaha	7	15	14	15	51
15	(United States) Jett Reynolds	Yamaha		18	19	13	37
16	(United States) RJ Hampshire	Husqvarna	9	9	15		36
17	(United States) Talon Hawkins	KTM		20	17	14	36
18	(United States) Lux Turner	KTM		19	16	16	33
19	(United States) Chance Hymas	Honda	17	16	DNS		23
20	(United States) Henry Miller	Honda		DNQ	18	17	23
21	(United States) Jalek Swoll	Triumph	14	23			14
22	(Denmark) Matti Jørgensen	Gas Gas		DNQ	22	19	9
23	(United States) Daxton Bennick	Yamaha	8				8
24	(United States) Robbie Wageman	Yamaha				20	6
25	(United States) Carson Mumford	Honda		17	DNQ		5
26	(United States) Joey Savatgy	Triumph	5				5
27	(United States) Max Sanford	Kawasaki			20	22	5
28	(United States) Casey Cochran	Husqvarna	4	DNS			4
29	(United States) Nate Thrasher	Yamaha	2	21	23		3
30	(United States) Ryder Floyd	Honda				21	3
31	(Canada) Cole Thompson	Yamaha		22	21		2
	(United States) Mark Fineis	Yamaha		DNQ			0
Pos	Rider	Bike	Points Reset	CON (North Carolina)	FOR (Texas)	LVE (Nevada)	Points

== See also ==
- AMA Supercross Championship
- AMA Motocross Championship
- 2024 FIM Supercross World Championship
- 2024 FIM Motocross World Championship
