= SuperMotocross World Championship =

American Off-road motorcycle racing competition

- Category: Motorcycle racing
- Country: United States
- Inaugural season: 2023
- Classes: 450cc; 250cc
- Constructors: Honda; Husqvarna; Kawasaki; KTM; Suzuki; Yamaha; Gas Gas; Triumph; Beta
- Riders' champion: •450cc (Spain) Jorge Prado •250cc (United States) Levi Kitchen
- Official website: www.supermotocross.com

The SuperMotocross World Championship (official name as AMA SuperMotocross Championship) is the premier combined discipline of American off-road motorcycle racing. Conceived in 2023 after the AMA Supercross Championship lost its FIM World Championship status, the series consists of the aforementioned Supercross series and the AMA Motocross Championship, followed by two playoff races and a final to determine the SuperMotocross world champion.

== Background ==
=== AMA Supercross Championship ===
The AMA Supercross Championship (commercially known as Monster Energy AMA Supercross) is the premier American stadium motorcycle racing series. Founded by the American Motorcyclist Association (AMA) in 1974, the AMA Supercross Championship races are held from January through early May. Supercross is a variant of motocross which involves off-road motorcycles on a constructed dirt track consisting of steep jumps and obstacles; the tracks are usually constructed inside a sports stadium. The easy accessibility and comfort of these stadium venues helped supercross surpass off-road motocross as a spectator attraction in the United States by the late 1970s.

The sport of Supercross is best described as motocross racing that takes place within the confines of a sports stadium. The tracks are typically shorter in length than a standard motocross track. They feature a combination of man-made obstacles such as whoop sections (where riders skim along the tops of multiple bumps), rhythm sections (irregular series of jumps with a variety of combination options), and triple jumps (three jumps in a row that riders normally clear in a single leap of 70 feet or more). Many of the turns have banked berms, but some are flat. It takes roughly five hundred truckloads of dirt to make up a supercross track. Soil conditions can be hard-packed, soft, muddy, sandy, rutted, or any combination thereof.

=== AMA Motocross Championship ===
The AMA Motocross Championship (commercially known as Pro Motocross Championship) is the American national outdoor motorcycle racing series. The motocross race series was founded and sanctioned by the American Motorcyclist Association (AMA) in 1972. The series is the premier motocross competition in the United States and is sanctioned by AMA Pro Racing and managed by MX Sports Pro Racing.

== Format ==
The Series will be held from January until September, consisting of:

- 17 AMA Supercross Championship rounds (January–May)
- 11 AMA Motocross Championship rounds (May–September)
- 2 SuperMotocross Playoffs and a SuperMotocross World Championship Final

As of 2026 only the top 20 in the combined standing for the AMA Supercross and AMA Motocross Championship in the 250 and 450 class qualify for the SuperMotocross playoffs and are automatically qualified and seeded for each round of the SuperMotocross World Championship. Under the current format the points are reset based on the combined standings with the riders further up in the combined standings starting the SuperMotocross playoffs with more points than those lower down the standings.

Riders from 21st-30th in the end of season combined standings can also qualify for the main event of each event through a Last Chance Qualifier, with the top 2 from the qualifier competing in the main events with the seeded riders. The LCQ is also open to riders who won a supercross main event or motocross moto if they did not finish inside the top 30. If a seeded top 20 rider is unable to compete in an event, an additional opportunity to qualify will be given to riders in the LCQ.

The first playoff race awards regular points, while the second playoff race awards double points and the world championship race awards triple points.

== Champions ==
SuperMotocross champions are crowned each year, alongside the champions of the individual series which will continue to be awarded.

SuperMotocross World Champions (2023–present)
Year	450cc Class	450cc Individual Series Champions		250cc Class	250cc Individual Series Champions	
Year	450cc Class	SX Champion	MX Champion	250cc Class	SX Champion	MX Champion
2023	(Australia) Jett Lawrence (Honda)	(United States) Chase Sexton (Honda)	(Australia) Jett Lawrence (Honda)	(United States) Haiden Deegan (Yamaha)	(Australia) Hunter Lawrence (Honda) (East) (Australia) Jett Lawrence (Honda) (West)	(Australia) Hunter Lawrence (Honda)
2024	(Australia) Jett Lawrence (Honda)	(Australia) Jett Lawrence (Honda)	(United States) Chase Sexton (KTM)	(United States) Haiden Deegan (Yamaha)	(France) Tom Vialle (KTM) (East) (United States) RJ Hampshire (Husqvarna) (West)	(United States) Haiden Deegan (Yamaha)
2025	(Australia) Jett Lawrence (Honda)	(United States) Cooper Webb (Yamaha)	(Australia) Jett Lawrence (Honda)	(Japan) Jo Shimoda (Honda)	(France) Tom Vialle (KTM) (East) (United States) Haiden Deegan (Yamaha) (West)	(United States) Haiden Deegan (Yamaha)
2026	(Spain) Jorge Prado (KTM)	(Germany) Ken Roczen (Suzuki)	(Australia) Hunter Lawrence (Honda)	(United States) Levi Kitchen (Kawasaki)	(New Zealand) Cole Davies (Yamaha) (East) (United States) Haiden Deegan (Yamaha) (West)	(New Zealand) Cole Davies (Yamaha)

== Statistics ==
=== Most Championships ===
450 Class	Titles	250 Class	Titles
(Australia) Jett Lawrence	3	(United States) Haiden Deegan	2
(Spain) Jorge Prado	1	(Japan) Jo Shimoda	1
		(United States) Levi Kitchen	1

=== SuperMotocross all time wins list ===
450 Class	Wins	250 Class	Wins
(Australia) Jett Lawrence	6	(United States) Haiden Deegan	4
(Australia) Hunter Lawrence	2	(Japan) Jo Shimoda	3
(United States) Haiden Deegan	2	(Australia) Hunter Lawrence	1
(United States) Chase Sexton	1	(United States) Pierce Brown	1
(Spain) Jorge Prado	1	(United States) Levi Kitchen	1
		(United States) Julien Beaumer	1
		(New Zealand) Cole Davies	1

== Television coverage ==
Since 2023, the tv partners will be from the NBC family of networks; NBC, NBCSN (Since 2026) and Peacock (USA and CNBC previously aired races from 2023–2025 but is no longer with the company).

Network	Coverage
NBC	Select races, including up to five Supercross races live and up to five on delay, up to four Motocross races live and one of the SuperMotocross Playoff races on delay
USA Network	Supercross season opener and finale live, two Motocross races on delay and SuperMotocross Playoff 1 and Finale live from 2023–2025
Peacock	Every race across all series live
CNBC	Every race across all series on next day replay from 2023–2025
NBCSN	Select races live as its schedule allows since 2026.

== See also ==
- FIM Supercross World Championship
- Motocross World Championship
- Australian Supercross Championship
- Australian Pro Motocross Championship
- British Motocross Championship
