= Justin Barcia =

American motorcycle racer

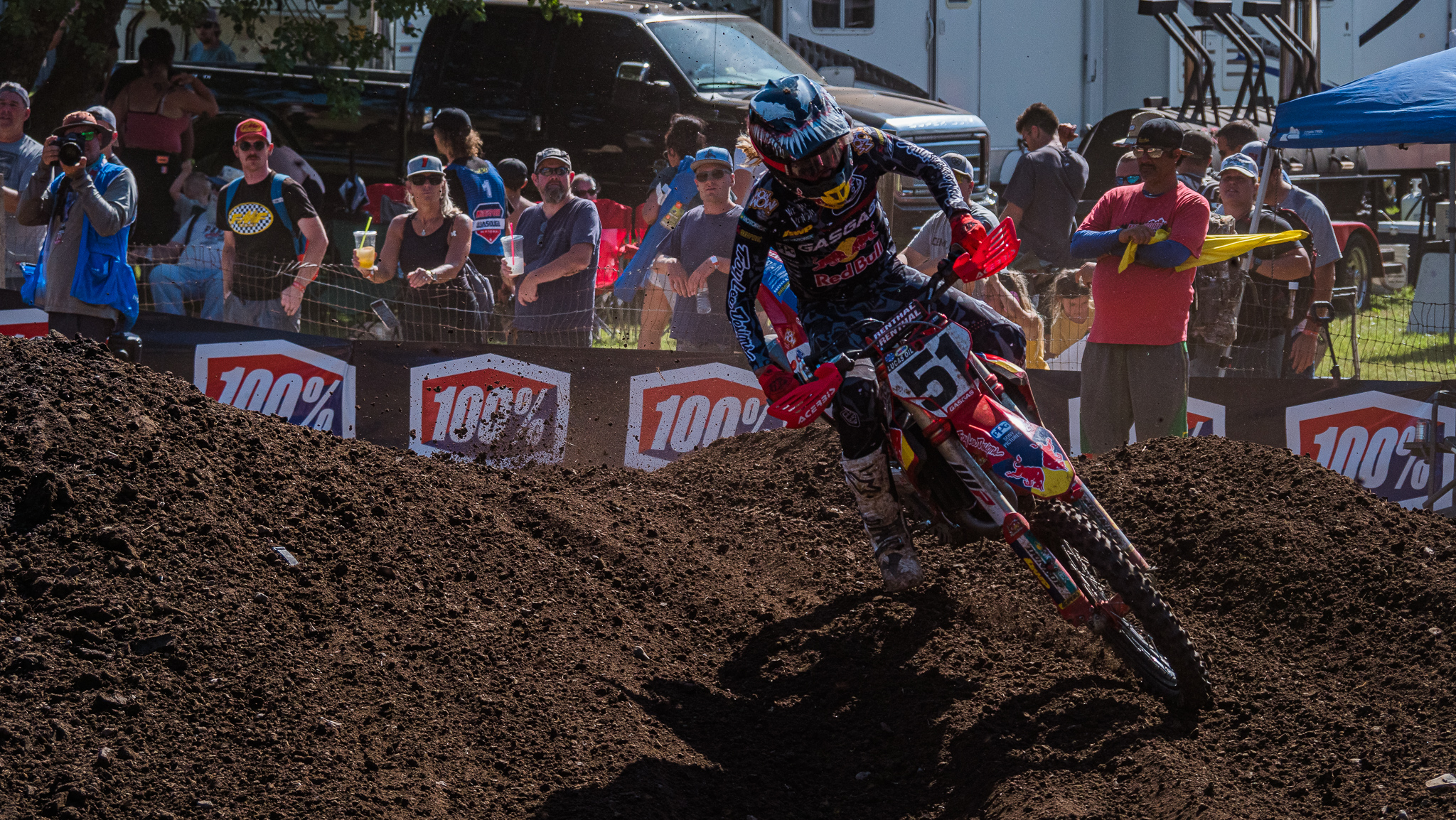
- Barcia in 2021
- Nationality: USA
- Born: March 25, 1992 (age 34) Monroe, New York, US

Motocross career
- Years active: 2009–present
- Teams: •Geico Honda/HRC (2009-2014); •JGRMX Yamaha/Suzuki (2014-2018); •Monster Energy Yamaha Star Racing (2018-2020); •Troy Lee Designs Red Bull/Rockstar Energy Gas Gas (2020–2025); •Troy Lee Designs Red Bull Ducati (2025-2026); •HEP Suzuki (2026-Present)
- Championships: •2011 AMA Supercross 250cc East; •2012 AMA Supercross 250cc East
- Wins: •AMA 250cc Supercross: 11; •AMA 250cc Motocross: 3; •AMA 450cc Supercross: 6; •AMA 450cc Motocross: 4; Total: 24

Justin Barcia ,born 25 March 1992, is an American motorcycle racer from Monroe, New York whose competed in the AMA Supercross and Motocross Championships from 2009. He is a two-time AMA Supercross 250cc East Champion.

== Career ==
Barcia began his career by winning back to back 250 Supercross East Championships in 2011 and 2012. Riding for Yamaha until 2019, Barcia has won the season opening race in Anaheim on multiple occasions. Barcia changed teams to race for Gas Gas in 2020.

== AMA Supercross/Motocross Results ==
| Year | Rnd 1 | Rnd 2 | Rnd 3 | Rnd 4 | Rnd 5 | Rnd 6 | Rnd 7 | Rnd 8 | Rnd 9 | Rnd 10 | Rnd 11 | Rnd 12 | Rnd 13 | Rnd 14 | Rnd 15 | Rnd 16 | Rnd 17 | Average Finish | Podium Percent | Place |
|---|---|---|---|---|---|---|---|---|---|---|---|---|---|---|---|---|---|---|---|---|
| 2009 250 MX | 6 | 10 | 31 | 6 | 4 | 6 | 3 | 11 | 8 | 4 | 1 | 6 | - | - | - | - | - | 8.00 | 17% | 5th |
| 2010 250 SX-E | - | - | - | - | - | - | 3 | 18 | 5 | 1 | 3 | 4 | 3 | 1 | - | - | 5 | 4.79 | 56% | 2nd |
| 2010 250 MX | 5 | 10 | 8 | 2 | 10 | 4 | 8 | 16 | 2 | 2 | 6 | 5 | - | - | - | - | - | 6.50 | 25% | 5th |
| 2011 250 SX-E | – | – | – | – | – | 1 | – | 2 | 2 | 2 | 1 | 2 | 2 | 1 | – | – | 3 | 1.78 | 100% | 1st |
| 2011 250 MX | 13 | 4 | 6 | 3 | 9 | 36 | 12 | 6 | OUT | OUT | OUT | OUT | - | - | - | - | - | 11.10 | 13% | 12th |
| 2011 450 MX | OUT | OUT | OUT | OUT | OUT | OUT | OUT | OUT | 3 | 7 | 13 | 3 | - | - | - | - | - | 6.50 | 50% | 16th |
| 2012 250 SX-E | – | – | – | – | – | – | 1 | 1 | 1 | 1 | 3 | 1 | 2 | 4 | – | – | 1 | 1.66 | 89% | 1st |
| 2012 250 MX | 2 | 5 | 1 | 2 | 3 | 2 | 2 | 1 | 5 | 4 | 3 | 2 | – | – | – | – | – | 2.66 | 75% | 2nd |
| 2013 450 SX | 7 | 1 | DNF | DNS | 3 | 2 | 6 | 4 | 5 | 3 | 5 | 5 | 4 | 4 | 1 | 5 | 5 | 4.00 | 33% | 4th |
| 2013 450 MX | 5 | 3 | 2 | 4 | 5 | 3 | 5 | 9 | 4 | 2 | 6 | 3 | - | - | - | - | - | 4.25 | 42% | 3rd |
| 2014 450 SX | 5 | 5 | 11 | 7 | 4 | 6 | 3 | OUT | OUT | 12 | 5 | 2 | 3 | 2 | 5 | 4 | 4 | 5.20 | 27% | 5th |
| 2014 450 MX | 13 | 5 | OUT | OUT | OUT | OUT | OUT | OUT | OUT | OUT | OUT | OUT | - | - | - | - | - | 9.00 | - | 22nd |
| 2015 450 SX | 6 | 11 | 4 | 6 | 8 | OUT | OUT | OUT | OUT | OUT | OUT | OUT | OUT | 9 | 16 | 20 | 8 | 9.78 | - | 15th |
| 2015 450 MX | 11 | 2 | 6 | 8 | 5 | 1 | 1 | 2 | 2 | 2 | 3 | 4 | - | - | - | - | - | 3.92 | 58% | 3rd |
| 2016 450 SX | 15 | 11 | OUT | OUT | OUT | OUT | OUT | OUT | OUT | OUT | OUT | 16 | 15 | 11 | 19 | 15 | 10 | 14.00 | - | 21st |
| 2016 450 MX | 7 | 14 | 7 | 5 | 11 | 4 | 3 | 5 | 5 | 5 | 2 | 2 | - | - | - | - | - | 5.83 | 25% | 4th |
| 2017 450 SX | | | | | | | | | | | | | | | | | | | | |
| 2017 450 MX | | | | | | | | | | | | | - | - | - | - | - | | | |
| 2018 450 SX | | | | | | | | | | | | | | | | | | | | |
| 2018 450 MX | 3 | 4 | 6 | 3 | 2 | 3 | 3 | 5 | 4 | 4 | 5 | 1 | – | – | – | – | – | 3.58 | 50% | 4th |
| 2019 450 SX | | | | | | | | | | | | | | | | | | | | |
| 2019 450 MX | | | | | | | | | | | | | - | - | - | - | - | | | |
| 2020 450 SX | 1 | 2 | 9 | 5 | 6 | 5 | 4 | 4 | 2 | 5 | 8 | 8 | 9 | 21 | 9 | 9 | 20 | 7.47 | 18% | 6th |
| 2020 450 MX | | | | | | | | | | - | - | - | - | - | - | - | - | | | |
| 2021 450 SX | 1 | 9 | 4 | 13 | 2 | 19 | 4 | 3 | 6 | 2 | 4 | 4 | 10 | 4 | 5 | 14 | 7 | 6.58 | 24% | 4th |
| 2021 450 MX | 4 | 4 | 7 | 8 | 3 | 1 | 5 | OUT | OUT | OUT | OUT | OUT | - | - | - | - | - | 4.57 | 29% | 9th |
| 2022 450 SX | 3 | 3 | 9 | 7 | 6 | 3 | 5 | 6 | 5 | 3 | 2 | 5 | 5 | 6 | 5 | 7 | 3 | 4.88 | 35% | 5th |
| 2022 450 MX | 9 | 10 | 7 | 6 | 3 | 10 | 6 | 6 | 8 | 15 | 14 | 5 | – | – | – | – | – | 8.25 | 8% | 8th |
| 2023 450 SX | 11 | 6 | 3 | 8 | 6 | 8 | 7 | 4 | 2 | 4 | 3 | 3 | 2 | 1 | DNF | OUT | OUT | 4.85 | 43% | 5th |
| 2023 450 MX | OUT | OUT | OUT | OUT | OUT | OUT | OUT | OUT | 19 | 5 | 7 | - | - | - | - | - | - | 10.33 | - | 19th |
| 2024 450 SX | 7 | 17 | 3 | 13 | 12 | 18 | 14 | 11 | 9 | 8 | 9 | 6 | 11 | 5 | 6 | 4 | 5 | 9.29 | 6% | 8th |
| 2024 450 MX | 5 | 7 | 4 | 8 | 7 | OUT | OUT | OUT | OUT | OUT | OUT | - | - | - | - | - | - | 6.20 | - | 14th |
| 2025 450 SX | 6 | 8 | 10 | 12 | 6 | 7 | 6 | 10 | 4 | 9 | 8 | 5 | 14 | 18 | OUT | OUT | OUT | 8.78 | - | 10th |
| 2025 450 MX | OUT | OUT | OUT | OUT | 9 | 7 | 5 | 7 | 9 | 8 | 5 | - | - | - | - | - | - | 7.14 | - | 10th |
| 2026 450 SX | DNF ANA (California) | OUT SDI (California) | OUT ANA (California) | OUT HOU (Texas) | OUT GLE (Arizona) | OUT SEA (Washington (state)) | OUT ARL (Texas) | OUT DAY (Florida) | OUT IND (Indiana) | OUT BIR (Alabama) | OUT DET (Michigan) | OUT STL (Missouri) | OUT NAS (Tennessee) | OUT CLE (Ohio) | 12 PHI (Pennsylvania) | 8 DEN (Colorado) | 15 SLC (Utah) | 11.67 | - | 24th |
| 2026 450 MX | 15 FOX (California) | 10 HAN (California) | 20 THU (Colorado) | OUT HIG (Pennsylvania) | 10 RED (Michigan) | 12 SOU (Massachusetts) | 5 SPR (Minnesota) | 7 WAS (Washington (state)) | 10 UNA (New York (state)) | 8 BUD (Maryland) | 11 IRN (Indiana) | - | - | - | - | - | - | 10.80 | - | 10th |
