= Cooper Webb =

American motorcycle racer (born 1995)

Paul Cooper Webb
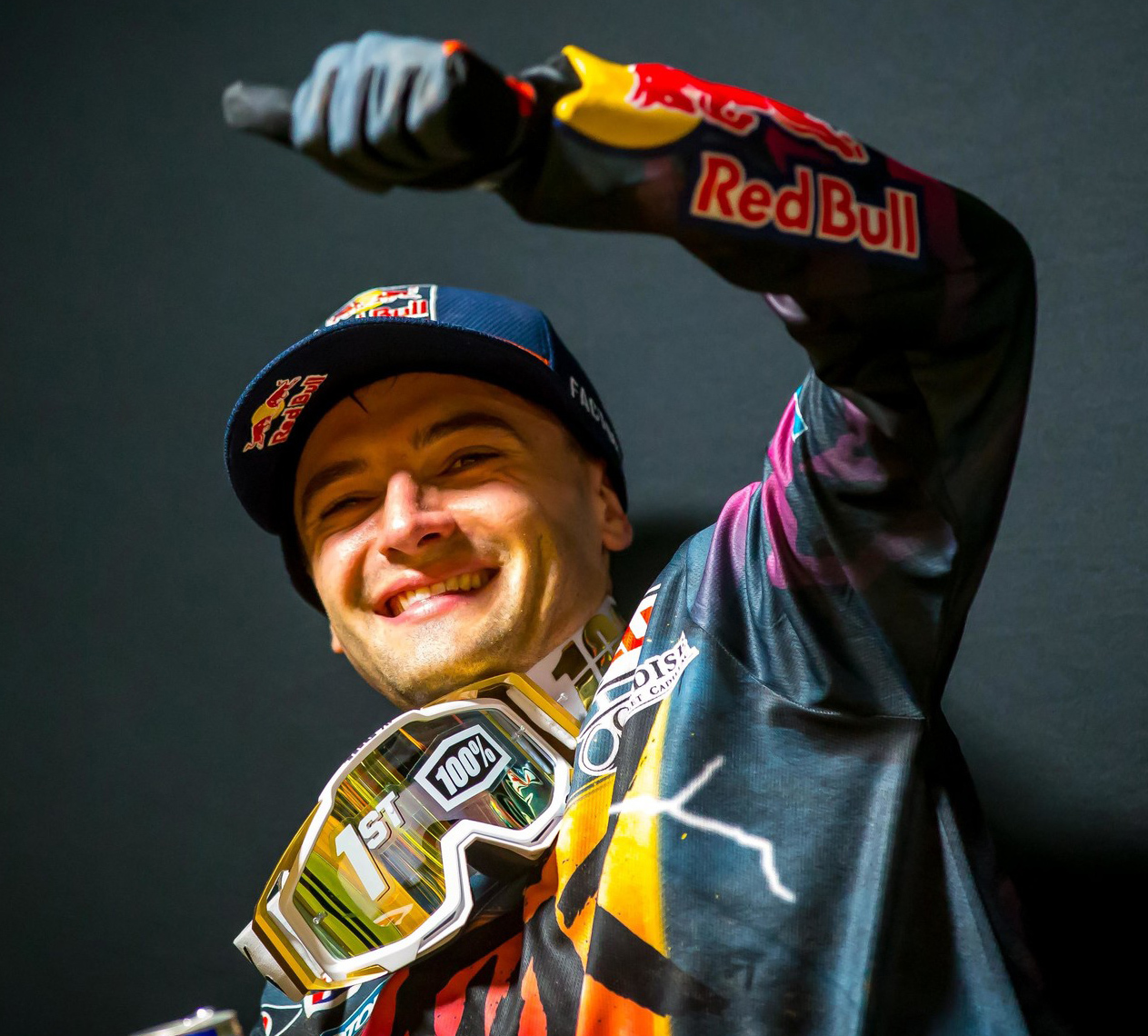
- Cooper Webb in 2019
- Nationality: American
- Born: November 10, 1995 (age 31) Newport, North Carolina

Motocross career
- Years active: 2013–present
- Teams: •Monster Energy Star Racing Yamaha (2013-2018, 2023-2026); •Red Bull Factory KTM (2018-2023); •Rocky Mountain ATV/MC Monster Energy Team Tedder Husqvarna (2026-Present)
- Championships: •2015 AMA Supercross 250cc West; •2016 AMA Supercross 250cc West; •2016 AMA 250cc Motocross; •2019 AMA Supercross 450cc; •2021 AMA Supercross 450cc; •2025 AMA Supercross 450cc
- Wins: •MX2: 1; •AMA 250cc Supercross: 11; •AMA 250cc Motocross: 7; •AMA 450cc Supercross: 31; •AMA 450cc Motocross: 1

Paul Cooper Webb (born November 10, 1995) is an American professional motocross and supercross racer. He has competed in the AMA Supercross and Motocross Championships since 2013. Webb is a three-time 450cc AMA Supercross Champion, a two-time 250cc AMA Supercross West Champion and a 250cc AMA Motocross Champion.

Ricky Carmichael has described Webb as "a warrior and a fighter". He runs plate number 2 shared by other notables such as Jeremy McGrath and Ryan Villopoto.

== Motocross career ==
=== Early life ===
Webb was born in Newport, North Carolina where his father Robert a professional surfer raced motocross during the 1970s. He competed in his first motocross race at the age of 4 at the Kinley MX. His first amateur championship came at age 6 riding a Yamaha PW50. He was named the youth motocrosser of the year in 2010.

2013-2018, Star Racing Yamaha

Webb began his professional motocross career at the age of 17 with the Yamaha factory racing team in 2013. He won his first AMA National race on June 28, 2014, in the 250 cc class at the Muddy Creek Raceway in Blountville, Tennessee and, was named the 2014 Monster Energy Supercross Rookie of the Year.

Webb won the 2015 250SX Western Regional supercross championship. The following season he successfully defended his 250SX Western Regional championship and also won the 2016 250cc AMA Motocross Championship, becoming the 11th winner of back-to-back titles and a winning percentage of 42% (11 wins / 26 starts). Webb was also the team captain for the American 2016 Motocross des Nations team that finished as runner-up to the French team.

2019-2023, Red Bull KTM

In 2019, Cooper Webb delivered a breakout year that redefined his career. In the Monster Energy AMA Supercross Championship, Webb entered as an underdog but quickly emerged as a front-runner after earning his first-ever 450SX main event win at Anaheim 2. Riding for Red Bull KTM, he went on to win a total of seven main events and claimed 13 podium finishes across the 17-round series. His consistency and racecraft, particularly in clutch moments, helped him outpace championship rivals like Eli Tomac, Marvin Musquin, and Ken Roczen. Webb clinched his first 450SX title in the season finale at Las Vegas, completing one of the sport’s most impressive comebacks and securing the 2019 Triple Crown title as well.

Despite a near season ending crash at Arlington, TX, that took him out of the 2020 outdoor season, Webb rallied to finish second behind Eli Tomac in the 2020 supercross points standings.

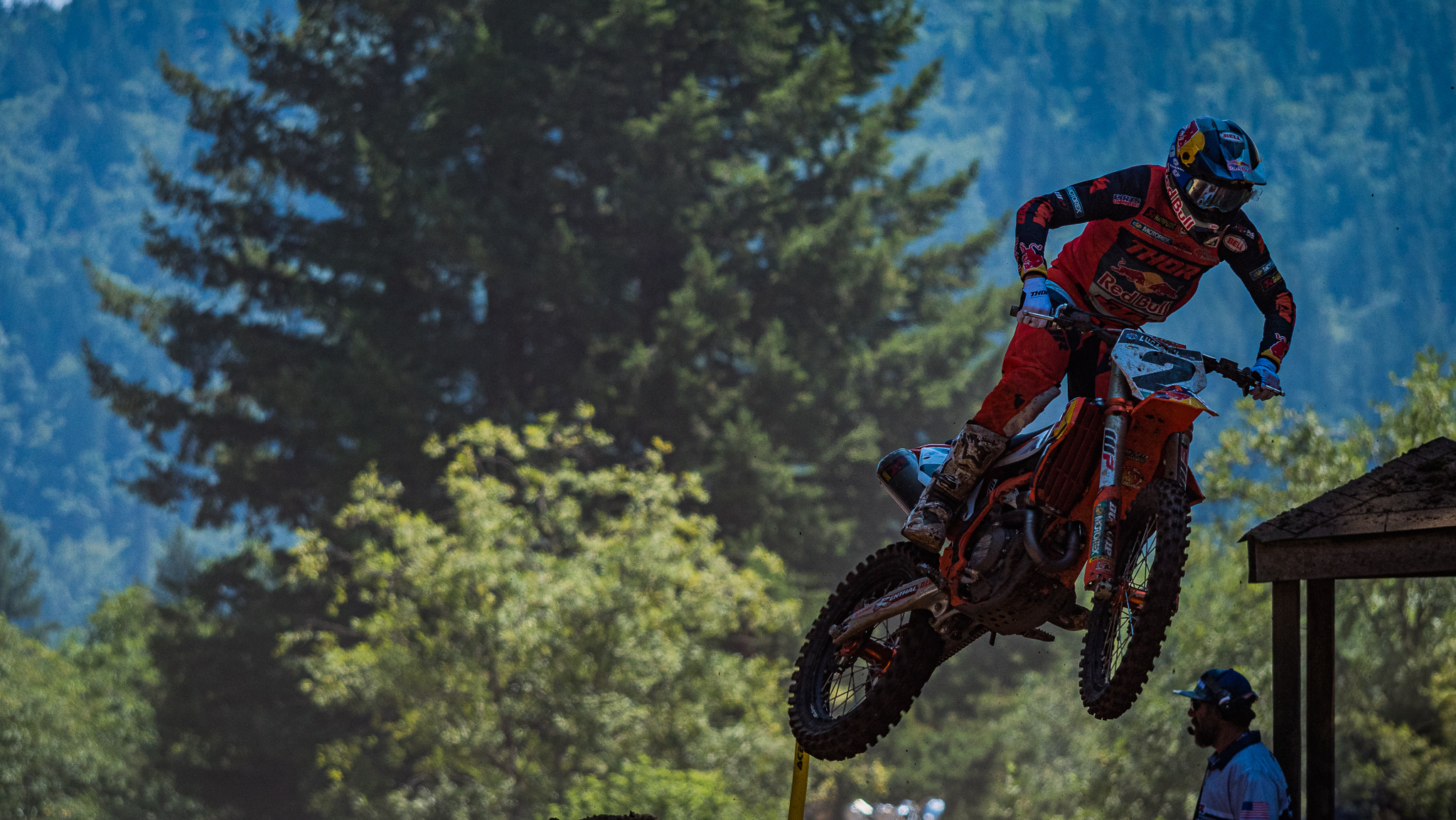
Webb in 2021 at the Washougal National.

In 2021, Webb delivered a commanding performance in the Monster Energy AMA Supercross Championship, securing his second 450SX title with Red Bull KTM Factory Racing. Despite a challenging start—finishing ninth at the opening round—Webb steadily climbed the standings, overtaking early leader Ken Roczen by mid-season. He amassed eight main event victories and 13 podium finishes over the 17-round series, showcasing remarkable consistency and resilience. Entering the final round in Salt Lake City with a 22-point lead, Webb needed only a 19th-place finish to clinch the championship. However, he chose to end the season emphatically, winning the race and sealing the title in dominant fashion.

On June 22, ESPN announced the full list of the 2021 ESPY Award nominations across all eligible categories. After Webb's second supercross championship, he was nominated for his first ESPY Award in the Best Athlete, Men's Action Sports Category.

Following a disappointing end to his supercross season, Webb raced the first four races of the nationals before once again being sidelined by injury. He also split from Red Bull KTM after five successful years, in which he won two 450cc AMA Supercross Championships.

On Friday September 8, it was announced that Webb would return to his former team Yamaha Star Racing on a multi-year deal.

2024-Present, Monster Energy Star Racing Yamaha

In Webb's first 450 class season on a Star Yamaha since 2018, he would pair with Eli Tomac and 450 rookie Justin Cooper. Webb started the 2024 Supercross Championship slowly, but picked up his first win at Anaheim 2 in Round 4. From then on, Webb would be the main rival to Honda rider Jett Lawrence, who was making his debut in the 450 SX class. Webb picked up four wins and five additional podium finishes on the season, which placed him second in the 450 SX points standings, later revealing he’d been dealing with a thumb injury sustained at round 9.

On November 4, Webb announced a multi year partnership with Fly Racing.

On November 17, Webb was crowned the King of Paris Supercross for the first time in his career.

=== 2025 ===
Webb's 2025 Monster Energy AMA Supercross season was a masterclass in consistency, resilience, and strategic racing, culminating in his third 450SX championship title. Webb secured multiple victories throughout the season, including standout performances in Detroit, Arlington, Indianapolis, Seattle, and Pittsburgh. He consistently finished on the podium, demonstrating remarkable consistency across the 17-round season. At 29 years and 6 months, Webb became the oldest racer to win the Monster Energy AMA Supercross Championship. Reflecting on his achievement, he expressed his excitement and pride in joining the ranks of legendary riders with three premier class titles.

== AMA Supercross/Motocross results ==
Year	Rnd 1	Rnd 2	Rnd 3	Rnd 4	Rnd 5	Rnd 6	Rnd 7	Rnd 8	Rnd 9	Rnd 10	Rnd 11	Rnd 12	Rnd 13	Rnd 14	Rnd 15	Rnd 16	Rnd 17	Average Finish	Podium Percent	Place
2013 250 MX	11	9	10	8	17	15	7	11	16	12	8	3	-	-	-	-	-	10.58	8%	9th
2014 250 SX-W	5	6	2	9	3	14	-	-	-	-	-	-	-	6	7	-	2	6.00	33%	5th
2014 250 MX	2	2	8	6	1	5	5	3	4	15	5	3	-	-	-	-	-	4.92	42%	3rd
2015 250 SX-W	7	1	1	2	1	1	-	-	-	-	-	-	-	1	1	-	DNS	1.88	88%	1st
2015 250 MX	10	OUT	OUT	OUT	OUT	8	3	1	1	21	3	9	-	-	-	-	-	7.00	50%	11th
2016 250 SX-W	1	1	1	21	2	2	1	-	-	-	-	1	-	-	-	-	11	4.56	78%	1st
2016 250 MX	3	3	5	3	1	1	1	2	3	1	5	3	-	-	-	-	-	2.58	83%	1st
2017 450 SX	10	14	4	8	3	14	OUT	OUT	OUT	OUT	OUT	13	14	8	9	14	10	10.08	8%	13th
2017 450 MX	7	17	11	5	9	DNF	4	5	OUT	4	7	5	-	-	-	-	-	7.40	-	8th
2018 450 SX	10	12	10	8	7	19	6	4	6	3	OUT	7	5	22	OUT	OUT	OUT	8.76	7%	9th
2018 450 MX	OUT	OUT	OUT	OUT	OUT	8	7	7	6	9	7	5	-	-	-	-	-	7.00	-	9th
2019 450 SX	5	10	1	1	8	1	1 (Note: Round 7 race in Arlington, TX was the closest finish in SuperCross history with only .028 seconds between Webb and 2nd place Ken Roczen.)	2	1	2	3	4	1	3	2	1	3	2.88	76%	1st
2019 450 MX	5	6	6	4	5	4	4	1	4	DNF	OUT	OUT	-	-	-	-	-	4.33	11%	6th
2020 450 SX	3	12	3	4	2	1	2	12	3	3	2	1	2	1	2	1	8	3.64	76%	2nd
2020 450 MX	7	OUT	OUT	OUT	OUT	OUT	OUT	OUT	OUT	-	-	-	-	-	-	-	-	7.00	-	27th
2021 450 SX	9	4	1	3	4	2	1	1	2	1	1	1	3	6	1	2	1	2.65	76%	1st
2021 450 MX	8	8	10	7	5	15	6	6	5	3	3	3	-	-	-	-	-	6.58	25%	4th
2022 450 SX	2	7	4	8	8	8	2	3	2	20	5	6	OUT	4	6	6	6	6.06	24%	7th
2022 450 MX	OUT	OUT	OUT	OUT	OUT	OUT	OUT	OUT	OUT	OUT	OUT	OUT	-	-	-	-	-	-	-	-
2023 450 SX	2	2	2	4	5	1	1	2	3	2	2	4	4	5	DNS	OUT	OUT	2.78	64%	3rd
2023 450 MX	5	3	3	5	OUT	OUT	OUT	OUT	OUT	OUT	OUT	-	-	-	-	-	-	4.00	50%	12th
2024 450 SX	6	11	2	1	4	7	1	4	2	5	1	2	1	3	4	5	3	3.64	53%	2nd
2024 450 MX	OUT	OUT	OUT	OUT	OUT	OUT	OUT	OUT	15	OUT	OUT	-	-	-	-	-	-	15.00	-	35th
2025 450 SX	4	3	8	2	2	1	1	2	1	4	1	3	2	2	1	2	4	2.52	76%	1st
2025 450 MX	13	6	6	10	8	9	OUT	OUT	OUT	OUT	OUT	-	-	-	-	-	-	8.67	-	13th
2026 450 SX	7 ANA (California)	8 SDI (California)	5 ANA (California)	1 HOU (Texas)	3 GLE (Arizona)	2 SEA (Washington (state))	3 ARL (Texas)	4 DAY (Florida)	3 IND (Indiana)	6 BIR (Alabama)	6 DET (Michigan)	5 STL (Missouri)	2 NAS (Tennessee)	2 CLE (Ohio)	2 PHI (Pennsylvania)	11 DEN (Colorado)	4 SLC (Utah)	4.35	47%	3rd
2026 450 MX	12 FOX (California)	8 HAN (California)	10 THU (Colorado)	13 HIG (Pennsylvania)	8 RED (Michigan)	6 SOU (Massachusetts)	15 SPR (Minnesota)	9 WAS (Washington (state))	12 UNA (New York (state))	6 BUD (Maryland)	3 IRN (Indiana)	-	-	-	-	-	-	9.27	9%	8th

== SMX Results ==
Year	Rnd 1	Rnd 2	Rnd 3	Average Finish	Podium Percent	Place
2023 450 SMX	8 CON (North Carolina)	7 CHI (Illinois)	3 LAC (California)	6.00	33%	4th
2024 450 SMX	10 CON (North Carolina)	5 FOR (Texas)	5 LVE (Nevada)	6.67	-	5th
2025 450 SMX	7 CON (North Carolina)	5 STL (Missouri)	7 LVE (Nevada)	6.33	-	6th
2026 450 SMX	4 COL (Ohio)	5 LOS (California)	5 RID (Missouri)	4.67	-	5th
