= Levi Kitchen =

American motorcycle racer

- Nationality: (United States) American
- Born: February 16, 2001 (age 25) Washougal, Washington, US

Motocross career
- Years active: 2021–present
- Teams: •Monster Energy Yamaha Star Racing (2020–2023); •Monster Energy Pro Circuit Kawasaki (2023–present)
- Championships: •2026 SMX 250cc
- Wins: •AMA 250cc Supercross: 5; •AMA 250cc Motocross: 4

Levi Kitchen (born February 16, 2001) is an American professional Motocross and Supercross racer competing in the AMA Supercross and Motocross championships. He was the 2022 Pro Motocross 250cc Rookie of the year.

== Personal life ==
Kitchen was born and raised in Washougal, Washington to Paul and Sara Kitchen. He has one sister. Kitchen received a bike at the age of three, and began racing at the age of six.

== Amateur career ==
As an amateur, Kitchen won four Loretta Lynn's Amateur Championship titles.

- 2020 450cc (B-Limited)
- 2020 250cc (B-Limited)
- 2021 Open (Pro Sport)
- 2021 250cc (Pro Sport)

== 250cc career ==
=== 2021 ===
Kitchen turned pro in 2021 with Monster Energy Star Racing Yamaha. He raced in six AMA motocross events with a best finish of eighth.

=== 2022 ===
Kitchen started the 250 East championship with a ninth in Minneapolis, but crashed in Arlington and was out for the rest of the season. He raced half of the motocross season with good results, gaining a moto win and an overall podium. He then broke his arm in a practice crash, but was able to return for the final round.

=== 2023 ===
Kitchen raced in the west division this year and won his first professional supercross race at Anaheim 2, which was a triple crown event. He achieved three more podiums and ended the supercross season 3rd in points.

Kitchen had a strong, complete outdoor season. He finished Motocross with three podium finishes and ended fifth in the championship.

In the inaugural SuperMotocross Championship, Kitchen went seventh, eighth, and fifth, with a moto win at the final round, to finish fourth overall.

On October 2, 2023, Kitchen announced his departure from Star Yamaha to Pro Circuit Kawasaki.

=== 2024 ===
Kitchen again raced the west division in Supercross and put on a strong battle for the championship, finishing in the top-five every race except for Nashville and gaining three wins. It came down to the final race in Salt Lake City, but he was edged out by R.J. Hampshire by five points for the championship.

Kitchen again had a strong outdoor season, staying inside the top-ten and gaining three wins and two other podiums. He finished third in the championship.

Kitchen put a charge in for the SuperMotocross championship, finishing third, fourth, and eighth for sixth overall.

=== 2025 ===
Kitchen came prepared to race the Supercross season in the West division, however, he got sick the day of the Anaheim 1 race and pulled out to race the East division. After some bad luck in the first round in Tampa, Kitchen rebounded to take the win in Detroit after a red flag restart. While riding well in Daytona, he crashed hard and sustained a broken collarbone and multiple fractures in his back. After recovering, he set his sights on preparing for outdoors.

== AMA Supercross/Motocross results ==
Results
Year	Rnd 1	Rnd 2	Rnd 3	Rnd 4	Rnd 5	Rnd 6	Rnd 7	Rnd 8	Rnd 9	Rnd 10	Rnd 11	Rnd 12	Rnd 13	Rnd 14	Rnd 15	Rnd 16	Rnd 17	Average Finish	Podium Percent	Place
'2023 250 SX-W	7	4	DNF	1	–	–	–	–	–	–	6	3	–	12	–	2	3	4.75	50%	3rd
2023 250 MX	9	8	3	9	2	8	5	5	2	13	15	–	–	–	–	–	–	6.27	27%	5th
2024 250 SX-W	3	2	5	1	-	2	-	-	-	-	1	1	-	14	-	2	5	3.60	70%	2nd
2024 250 MX	2	3	5	9	7	6	1	6	1	1	11	-	-	-	-	-	-	4.73	45%	3rd
2025 250 SX-E	-	-	-	-	9	1	-	DNF	OUT	OUT	-	OUT	OUT	OUT	OUT	-	OUT	5.00	50%	18th
2025 250 MX	16	3	3	3	3	7	6	11	8	10	3	-	-	-	-	-	-	6.64	45%	4th
2026 250 SX-W	6 ANA (California)	4 SDI (California)	DNF ANA (California)	2 HOU (Texas)	2 GLE (Arizona)	2 SEA (Washington (state))	-	-	-	5 BIR (Alabama)	-	7 STL (Missouri)	-	-	-	2 DEN (Colorado)	2 SLC (Utah)	3.20	50%	2nd
2026 250 MX	4 FOX (California)	1 HAN (California)	2 THU (Colorado)	4 HIG (Pennsylvania)	5 RED (Michigan)	2 SOU (Massachusetts)	3 SPR (Minnesota)	5 WAS (Washington (state))	2 UNA (New York (state))	5 BUD (Maryland)	DNF IRN (Indiana)	-	-	-	-	-	-	3.30	45%	3rd

== SMX Results ==
Year	Rnd 1	Rnd 2	Rnd 3	Average Finish	Podium Percent	Place
2023 250 SMX	7 CON (North Carolina)	8 CHI (Illinois)	5 LAC (California)	6.67	-	4th
2024 250 SMX	3 CON (North Carolina)	4 FOR (Texas)	8 LVE (Nevada)	5.00	33%	6th
2025 250 SMX	4 CON (North Carolina)	10 STL (Missouri)	14 LVE (Nevada)	9.33	-	9th
2026 250 SMX	1 COL (Ohio)	3 LOS (California)	2 RID (Missouri)	2.00	100%	1st
