= Jett Lawrence =

Australian motorcycle racer

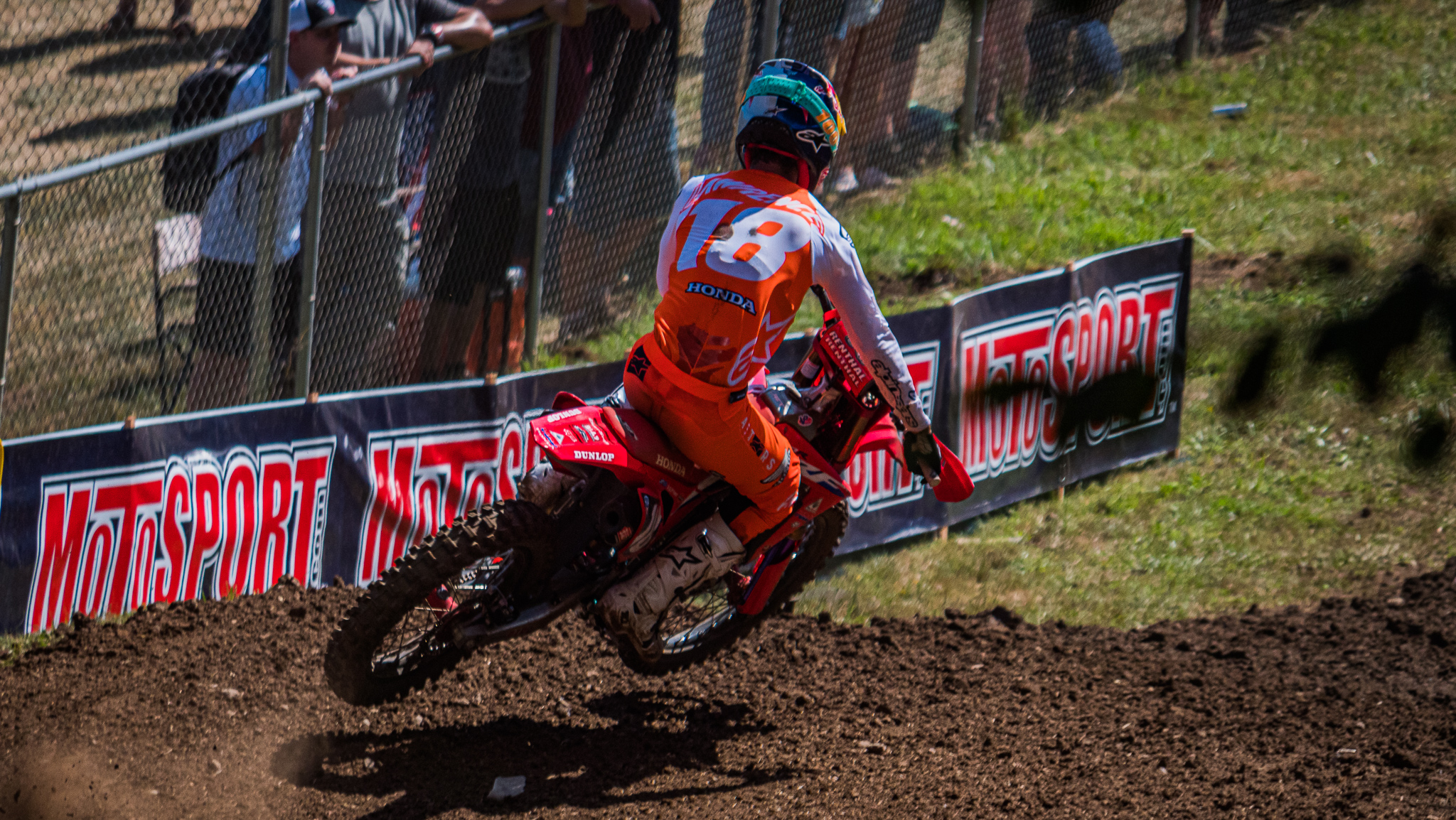
- Jett in 2021
- Nationality: Australian (Australia)
- Born: August 9, 2003 (age 23) Landsborough, Australia

Motocross career
- Years active: 2019–present
- Teams: •Honda HRC (2019–present)
- Championships: •2014 FIM 65cc; •2021 AMA Motocross 250cc; •2022 AMA Supercross 250cc East; •2022 AMA Motocross 250cc; •2023 AMA Supercross 250cc West; •2023 AMA Motocross 450cc (22-0); •2023 SMX 450cc; •2024 AMA Supercross 450cc; •2024 SMX 450cc; •2025 AMA Motocross 450cc; •2025 SMX 450cc
- Wins: •AMA 250cc Supercross: 13; •AMA 250cc Motocross: 14; •AMA 450cc Supercross: 9; •AMA 450cc Motocross: 28; •AMA Total Wins: 64

Jett Lawrence (born August 9, 2003, in Landsborough, Queensland, Australia) is an Australian Motocross racer. Competing in the AMA Supercross & Motocross Championships; a 450cc AMA Supercross Champion, three-time 450cc SMX, two-time 450cc AMA Motocross, 250cc AMA Motocross, & 250cc AMA Supercross Champion. He was a member of the winning Australia team at the 2024 & 2025 Motocross des Nations.

Lawrence was the 2020 Marty Smith Pro Rookie of the year in the 250cc class for the AMA Motocross Championship. He also received the Ricky Carmichael Award at the 2022 Motocross des Nations.

== Amateur career ==
In 2014 at the age of 11, Lawrence won the 65cc Junior Motocross World Championship. In 2016, Lawrence raced the German ADAC series as well as the 85cc Motocross World Championship. In 2018, Lawrence at age 14 moved up to race in the 250 European Motocross Championship, where he won his first overall at the final round in Assen, going 1–1 in both motos.

== 250cc career ==
=== 2019 ===
Motocross

On August 7th, 2019, Lawrence turned 16 years old, making him eligible to race the final three rounds of AMA Pro Motocross and marking his pro debut a few days later on:

August 10, 2019, Unadilla National where Jett went 21-8 finishing 13th overall

August 17, 2019, Budds Creek National Jett went 24-30 finishing 26th

August 24, 2019, Ironman National Jett went 12-14 finishing 13th overall

=== 2020 ===
Supercross

2020 was Lawrence's first full AMA Supercross and Motocross season. However, in his third Supercross race at Anaheim 2 on January 18, 2020, he broke his collarbone, which put him out for six weeks. He returned to catch the finale of the Supercross season securing his first supercross podium at Salt Lake City 5 on June 14, 2020, placing third on the podium at only 16 years old. He then raced the final round on June 21, 2020, at Salt Lake City 7 E/W Showdown, placing fifth. He finished the season tenth overall.

Motocross

Lawrence had a solid official full debut season in the 2020 AMA Pro Motocross season. He finished in the top-five four times this season and won his first overall podium round 9 at Fox Raceway. This put him at fourth in the final standings and won him the 2020 Marty Smith Rookie of the year award.

=== 2021 ===
Prior to the 2021 season, it was announced that Lawrence would sign a factory deal with HRC Honda, and also sign a sponsorship deal with Red Bull.

Supercross

In supercross, Lawrence won his first race in the 250cc class at round 2, then again at round 7 and 17. He finished on the podium at five of the eight rounds he raced, which would place him third overall for the year.

Motocross

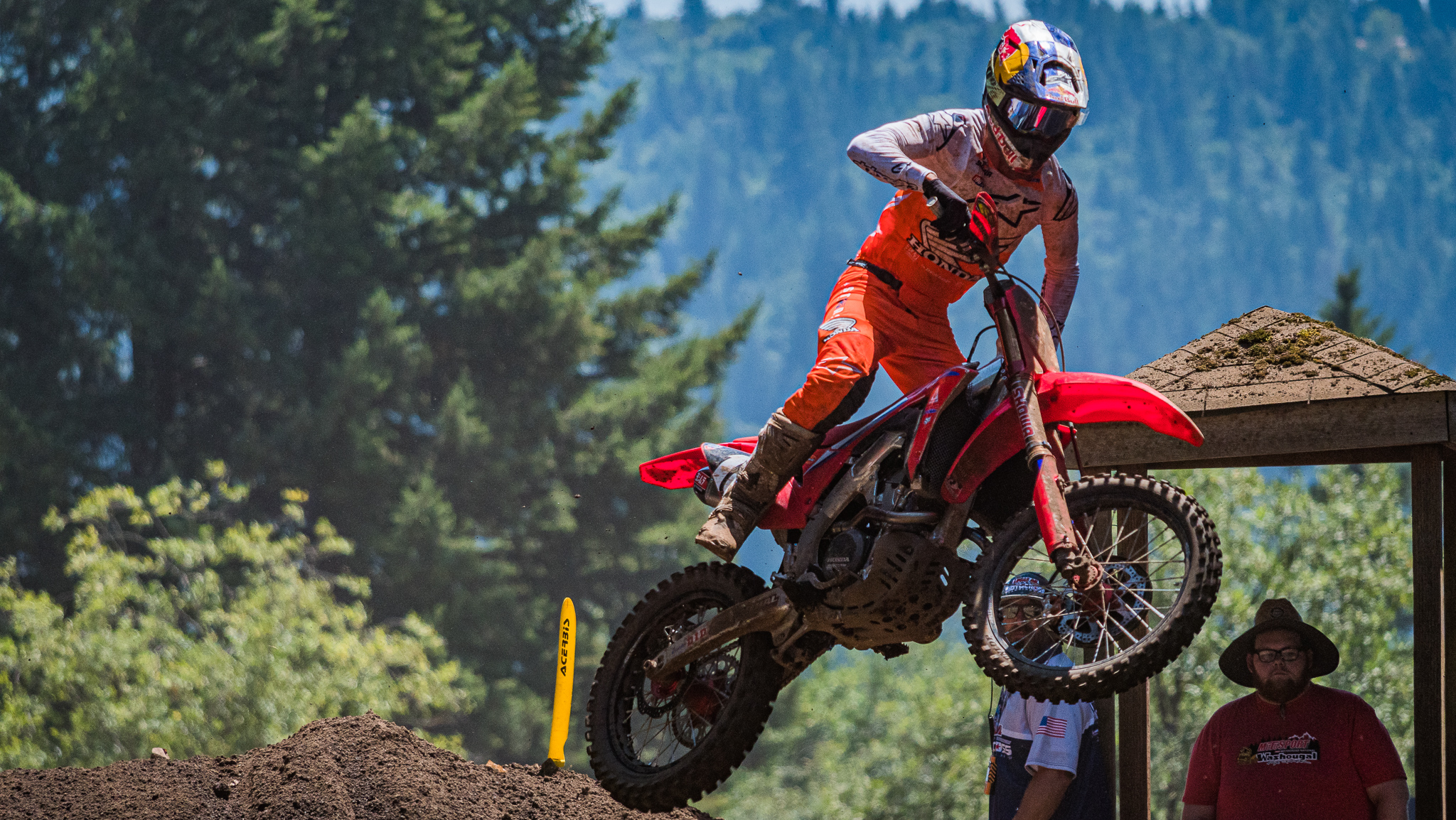
Lawrence in 2021 at the Washougal National.

In Pro Motocross, Lawrence won his first AMA championship. He won four rounds and finished on the podium eight times.

=== 2022 ===
Supercross

2022 was a year of domination in 250cc East Supercross as well as 250cc Motocross. Lawrence won the East title at round 15. He won four races and had a 100% podium percentage.

Motocross

Lawrence at 18 years old began the nationals by winning the first four rounds until a bike malfunction at round 5 in Red Bud. He responded by winning five out of the next seven rounds and at Fox Raceway II, he successfully defended the 250cc title.

=== 2023 ===
Before the 2023 season, it was announced that Lawrence wouldn't defend his East title, but switch coasts to the West, in an effort to become one of the select few to have won titles on both coasts.

Supercross

Lawrence clinched the 250cc West title at round 16, Denver. He raced his final 250cc race the following week at Salt Lake City, which he won.

== 450cc career ==
=== 2023 ===
Motocross

Lawrence became the youngest rider to win his 450cc AMA Motocross professional debut at round one of the nationals with a 1–1 score, in Fox raceway, Pala. Lawrence clinched the 2023 450cc AMA Motocross Championship in his rookie season at round nine, Unadilla. He ended the season undefeated in moto scores at 22–0, an achievement that hasn't been accomplished since James Stewart in 2008, and is the first rookie to reach the achievement.

SuperMotocross

At round one of the SMX championship, Lawrence struggled in the first moto, but persevered and ended the day 7–2, for fourth. Round two saw Lawrence win race one, and lead race two for a majority, before making a controversial decision in which he waved Ken Roczen by, believing that the races scored individual points. Round three of the SMX championship saw a return to LA Coliseum for the first time since 1998. Lawrence ended the evening with a 1–1 score, the inaugural SuperMotocross Championship, and $1 million.

=== 2024 ===
Supercross

Lawrence became the first rider in Supercross history to win their 450cc debut at the opening round in Anaheim 1. He became only the third rider in Supercross history to win the premier class championship as a rookie after Jeremy McGrath (1993) and Ryan Dungey (2010).

Motocross

Lawrence won round 1 of the Motocross season with a 1–1 score, extending his moto win streak to 24. After holeshotting Race 1 at Round 2, Lawrence misjudged a downhill section which resulted in a crash that subsequently ended his 24 moto win streak & relegated him to 24th. He ended the day with scores of 24-6 for 12th. After the injury sustained at round 2, Lawrence would win the next three rounds before being sidelined due to UCL injury to his thumb.

SuperMotocross

On his return to racing, Lawrence won the opening round of the SMX Championship with 2-1 scores. Round 2, moto 1 saw Lawrence battle his brother Hunter Lawrence & Eli Tomac, in what would be one of the best races of the year. Lawrence ended the day with 3-2 scores for third. Heading into the finale, Lawrence was nine points behind Hunter and eight behind Chase Sexton. An early racing incident in moto 1 saw Sexton unable to continue, leaving the brothers to battle for the $1 million. Jett secured his second 450cc SuperMotocross Championship with a 1-1 finish.

=== 2025 ===
Supercross

Lawrence began the 2025 Supercross season with high expectations as the defending 450SX champion. He secured a notable victory at Anaheim 2 on January 25, showcasing his skill amid challenging wet track conditions. However, his momentum was disrupted during Round 4 in Glendale on February 1, where he suffered a torn ACL that sidelined him for the remainder of the supercross season. Despite this setback, Lawrence managed to accumulate 71 points over the season, placing him 18th in the final 450SX standings.

Motocross

Lawrence entered the 2025 outdoor season as one of the favorites in the 450 class. He posted dominating performances across many rounds, frequently sweeping motos and collecting overall victories. At RedBud (Round 5), he recorded a 1–1 moto result to take the overall win. Across the season, he won all but two rounds in the series and secured the 450cc championship.

Although Lawrence experienced occasional pressure from rivals—such as at Washougal, where Chase Sexton handed him his first overall loss of the season, he remained largely dominant. He also posted strong results at High Point, Southwick, and Thunder Valley, among other venues, often sweeping motos or placing first overall.

Lawrence's consistency, racecraft, and ability to rebound from adversity allowed him to collect sufficient points to outpace his closest challengers and win the title.

SuperMotocross

For the third consecutive year, Lawrence retained the 450SMX title. After winning round 1 with a controlled performance, and a cancellation of the second moto, he finished second at round two behind his brother. At the finale, it was a winner-take-all between the 2 brothers, with Jett Edging his brother with 1-2 moto scores compared to 3-1, after a late pass on Eli Tomac in the second moto.

== Motocross des Nations participation ==
=== 2022 ===
The 2022 Motocross Des nations was held at Red Bud MX, in Buchanan, Michigan. Lawrence, then 19 years old, raced on a 450 for the first time professionally in his career. He went 1–2 to win the open class as well as lead team Australia to a third-place finish.

=== 2023 ===
The 2023 Motocross Des Nations was held in Ernee, France. Lawrence raced in the MXGP class and placed second in the qualifying race on Saturday. During race one, Lawrence fell in one of the first corners, but fought back to sixth place after a last turn pass on Tim Gajser. Lawrence then won race three, which helped place team Australia second overall.

=== 2024 ===
The 2024 Motocross Des Nations was held at Matterley Basin, Winchester, England. Lawrence was chosen for the Open class and won his qualifying race on Saturday. Jett went 1–2 on the day to win his class as well as grant team Australia's Maiden Motocross Des Nations victory.

=== 2025 ===
The 2025 Motocross Des Nations was held at Ironman Raceway, Crawfordsville, Indiana, United States of America. Team Australia consisted of Jett, Kyle Webster & Hunter Lawrence. Jett was chosen for the MXGP class and won his qualification race on Saturday by eight seconds. Race 1 on Sunday saw Jett lead every lap for the duration of race on his way to victory. After Race 2, Australia held a one-point lead over team USA & a three-point lead over team France. After a fall on lap 1, Jett stormed through the field making passes in quick succession, charging all the way to third. This granted Jett the MXGP class overall. Team Australia lifted the Chamberlain Trophy for the second consecutive year.

== Personal life ==
Jett's brother Hunter Lawrence is also a competitive motocross racer.

Originating in Australia, the family moved to Europe at the end of 2015 to pursue motocross. At the time of the move, Jett Lawrence was just 12 years old and Hunter was 16. It would be three years later before they would move again to America.

== AMA Supercross/Motocross results ==
Year	Rnd 1	Rnd 2	Rnd 3	Rnd 4	Rnd 5	Rnd 6	Rnd 7	Rnd 8	Rnd 9	Rnd 10	Rnd 11	Rnd 12	Rnd 13	Rnd 14	Rnd 15	Rnd 16	Rnd 17	Average Finish	Podium Percent	Place
2020 250 SX-W	9 ANA	5 STL	9 ANA	OUT GLE	OUT OAK	OUT SDI	-	-	-	-	-	-	-	11 SLC	3 SLC	-	5 SLC	7.00	17%	10th
2020 250 MX	6 LLS	34 LLS	5 IRN	6 RED	6 RED	4 SPR	4 WWR	6 THU	1 FOX	-	-	-	-	-	-	-	-	8.00	11%	4th
‡2021 250 SX-E	6 HOU	1 HOU	3 HOU	4 IND	DNS IND	5 IND	1 ORL	-	-	-	-	-	-	-	-	2 SLC	1 SLC	2.87	62%	3rd
2021 250 MX	1 FOX	2 THU	2 HIG	3 RED	6 SOU	4 SPR	4 WAS	1 UNA	2 BUD	1 IRN	1 FOX	5 HAN	-	-	-	-	-	2.66	66%	1st
2022 250 SX-E	-	-	-	-	-	-	1 MIN	3 ARL	1 DAY	1 DET	1 IND	-	2 STL	3 ATL	2 FOX	-	OUT SLC	1.75	100%	1st
2022 250 MX	1 FOX	1 HAN	1 THU	1 HIG	9 RED	1 SOU	1 SPR	1 WAS	4 UNA	3 BUD	1 IRN	1 FOX	-	-	-	-	-	2.08	83%	1st
¶2023 250 SX-W	1 ANA	1 OAK	1 SDI	2 ANA	-	-	-	-	-	-	1 SEA	1 GLE	-	2 EAR	-	3 DEN	1 SLC	1.44	100%	1st
2023 450 MX	1 FOX	1 HAN	1 THU	1 HIG	1 RED	1 SOU	1 SPR	1 WAS	1 UNA	1 BUD	1 IRN	-	-	-	-	-	-	1.00	100%	1st
2024 450 SX	1 ANA	9 SFR	4 SDI	6 ANA	1 DET	3 GLE	4 ARL	1 DAY	1 BIR	1 IND	3 SEA	8 STL	5 FOX	1 NAS	1 PHI	1 DEN	7 SLC	3.35	59%	1st
2024 450 MX	1 FOX	12 HAN	1 THU	1 HIG	1 SOU	OUT	OUT	OUT	OUT	OUT	OUT	-	-	-	-	-	-	3.20	80%	9th
2025 450 SX	12 ANA	2 SDI	1 ANA	8 GLE	OUT	OUT	OUT	OUT	OUT	OUT	OUT	OUT	OUT	OUT	OUT	OUT	OUT	5.75	50%	18th
2025 450 MX	1 FOX	1 HAN	1 THU	1 HIG	1 SOU	1 RED	1 SPR	2 WAS	6 IRN	1 UNA	1 BUD	-	-	-	-	-	-	1.54	91%	1st
2026 450 SX	OUT	OUT	OUT	OUT	OUT	OUT	OUT	OUT	OUT	OUT	OUT	OUT	OUT	OUT	OUT	OUT	OUT	-	-	-
2026 450 MX	3 FOX	1 HAN	1 THU	2 HIG	3 RED	1 SOU	3 SPR	2 WAS	1 UNA	4 BUD	6 IRN	-	-	-	-	-	-	2.45	82%	2nd

Notes:

- 1) The AMA Motocross Season (MX) is 12 rounds, but as of 2023, it is 11 Rounds. The AMA Supercross Season (SX) is 17 Rounds. East and West in the 250 class usually split the events with a few Showdowns where both coasts combine and race each other.
- ‡Lawrence suffered a number of crashes, including a big one in his heat race. The Australian lined up for the LCQ and won, but opted to not start the main event with a painful right shoulder. he returned for the next round.
- ¶ Lawrence did not win three races in a row to start the 2023 SX-West season. The 2nd round of the 2023 SX (SMX) series (Oakland, CA) was rescheduled to take place after the 6th round due to flooding; but is still classified as the 2nd round.

== SMX Results ==
Year	Rnd 1	Rnd 2	Rnd 3	Average Finish	Podium Percent	Place
2023 450 SMX	4 CON	1 CHI	1 LAC	2.00	66%	1st
2024 450 SMX	1 CON	3 FOR	1 LVE	1.67	100%	1st
2025 450 SMX	1 CON	2 STL	1 LVE	1.33	100%	1st
2026 450 SMX	OUT COL	OUT LOS	OUT RID			
