= Henry Fowler =

Henry Fowler may refer to:

- Henry the Fowler (861–936), Duke of Saxony and King of the Germans
- Henry Fowler (hymn writer) (1779–1838), English hymn writer
- Henry Fowler (American politician) (1799–?), American farmer and politician in Maryland and Wisconsin
- Henry J. Fowler, Maryland businessman and legislator
- Henry Fowler, 1st Viscount Wolverhampton (1830–1911), British politician
- H. W. Fowler (Henry Watson Fowler, 1858–1933), English schoolmaster, lexicographer and commentator on the usage of English
- Henry Fowler (rugby), English rugby union footballer who played in the 1870s
- Henry Fowler (died 1896) of Milsom and Fowler, Victorian murderer
- Sir Henry Fowler (engineer), (1870–1938) English locomotive engineer
- Henry Fowler, 2nd Viscount Wolverhampton (1870–1943), son of Henry Hartley Fowler, 1st Viscount Wolverhampton
- Henry Weed Fowler (1878–1965), zoologist
- Henry H. Fowler (1908–2000), U.S. Secretary of the Treasury
- Henry Fowler (educator) (1915–2007), Jamaican educator and politician

== See also ==
- Harry Fowler (disambiguation)
