= 2023 AMA National Motocross Championship =

2023 AMA motocross championship season

The 2023 AMA Motocross Championship season was the 52nd AMA Motocross National Championship season, the premier motocross series in USA. Eli Tomac went into the season as the defending champion in the 450 class, after taking his fourth 450 national title in 2022. However, after an injury sustained during the 2023 AMA Supercross Championship Tomac did not defend his title. In the 250 class, Jett Lawrence went into the season as the defending champion, after winning his second 250 title the previous season. However, Lawrence moved up to the 450MX class, which meant he did not defend his title.

In his rookie season in the 450 class, Jett Lawrence recorded a perfect season by winning all 22 races. His older brother, Hunter Lawrence, took his first American motocross title in the 250 class.

The championship formed the second part of the inaugural SuperMotocross World Championship.

== Calendar and Results ==
=== 450cc ===
Round	Date	Location	Race 1 Winner	Race 2 Winner	Round Winner
1	May 27	(California) Fox Raceway National	(Australia) Jett Lawrence	(Australia) Jett Lawrence	(Australia) Jett Lawrence
2	June 3	(California) Hangtown Motocross Classic	(Australia) Jett Lawrence	(Australia) Jett Lawrence	(Australia) Jett Lawrence
3	June 10	(Colorado) Thunder Valley National	(Australia) Jett Lawrence	(Australia) Jett Lawrence	(Australia) Jett Lawrence
4	June 17	(Pennsylvania) High Point National	(Australia) Jett Lawrence	(Australia) Jett Lawrence	(Australia) Jett Lawrence
5	July 1	(Michigan) Red Bud National	(Australia) Jett Lawrence	(Australia) Jett Lawrence	(Australia) Jett Lawrence
6	July 8	(Massachusetts) Southwick National	(Australia) Jett Lawrence	(Australia) Jett Lawrence	(Australia) Jett Lawrence
7	July 15	(Minnesota) Spring Creek National	(Australia) Jett Lawrence	(Australia) Jett Lawrence	(Australia) Jett Lawrence
8	July 22	(Washington (state)) Washougal National	(Australia) Jett Lawrence	(Australia) Jett Lawrence	(Australia) Jett Lawrence
9	August 12	(New York (state)) Unadilla National	(Australia) Jett Lawrence	(Australia) Jett Lawrence	(Australia) Jett Lawrence
10	August 19	(Maryland) Budds Creek National	(Australia) Jett Lawrence	(Australia) Jett Lawrence	(Australia) Jett Lawrence
11	August 26	(Indiana) Ironman National	(Australia) Jett Lawrence	(Australia) Jett Lawrence	(Australia) Jett Lawrence

=== 250cc ===
Round	Date	Location	Race 1 Winner	Race 2 Winner	Round Winner
1	May 27	(California) Fox Raceway National	(United States) RJ Hampshire	(Australia) Hunter Lawrence	(Australia) Hunter Lawrence
2	June 3	(California) Hangtown Motocross Classic	(United States) Haiden Deegan	(Australia) Hunter Lawrence	(Australia) Hunter Lawrence
3	June 10	(Colorado) Thunder Valley National	(United States) Justin Cooper	(Australia) Hunter Lawrence	(Australia) Hunter Lawrence
4	June 17	(Pennsylvania) High Point National	(United States) RJ Hampshire	(Australia) Hunter Lawrence	(United States) RJ Hampshire
5	July 1	(Michigan) Red Bud National	(Australia) Hunter Lawrence	(United States) Levi Kitchen	(United States) Haiden Deegan
6	July 8	(Massachusetts) Southwick National	(France) Tom Vialle	(Japan) Jo Shimoda	(France) Tom Vialle
7	July 15	(Minnesota) Spring Creek National	(Australia) Hunter Lawrence	(United States) Justin Cooper	(Australia) Hunter Lawrence
8	July 22	(Washington (state)) Washougal National	(United States) Haiden Deegan	(United States) Haiden Deegan	(United States) Haiden Deegan
9	August 12	(New York (state)) Unadilla National	(United States) Levi Kitchen	(United States) Justin Cooper	(Australia) Hunter Lawrence
10	August 19	(Maryland) Budds Creek National	(United States) Justin Cooper	(Australia) Hunter Lawrence	(Australia) Hunter Lawrence
11	August 26	(Indiana) Ironman National	(Japan) Jo Shimoda	(Japan) Jo Shimoda	(Japan) Jo Shimoda

=== Track locations ===
2023 AMA Motocross Championship locations

== 450cc ==
=== Entry list ===
Team	Constructor	No	Rider	Rounds
Red Bull KTM Factory Racing USA	KTM	2	(United States) Cooper Webb	1–4
Red Bull KTM Factory Racing USA	KTM	7	(United States) Aaron Plessinger	All
Monster Energy Kawasaki	Kawasaki	9	(United States) Adam Cianciarulo	All
Monster Energy Kawasaki	Kawasaki	21	(United States) Jason Anderson	5–11
Twisted Tea HEP Suzuki presented by Progressive Insurance	Suzuki	11	(United States) Kyle Chisholm	1–3, 6–10
Twisted Tea HEP Suzuki presented by Progressive Insurance	Suzuki	47	(Sweden) Fredrik Norén	All
Twisted Tea HEP Suzuki presented by Progressive Insurance	Suzuki	50	(United States) Marshal Weltin	1–3
Rick Ware Racing Mobil 1	Yamaha	12	(United States) Shane McElrath	7–8, 11
Rick Ware Racing Mobil 1	Kawasaki	45	(United States) Colt Nichols	8, 11
Monster Energy Star Racing Yamaha	Yamaha	14	(France) Dylan Ferrandis	All
Monster Energy Star Racing Yamaha	Yamaha	906	(Australia) Jay Wilson	9–11
Team Honda HRC	Honda	18	(Australia) Jett Lawrence	All
Team Honda HRC	Honda	23	(United States) Chase Sexton	1, 5–11
Muc-Off FXR ClubMX Yamaha Racing	Yamaha	36	(United States) Garrett Marchbanks	3–11
Muc-Off FXR ClubMX Yamaha Racing	Yamaha	69	(United States) Phil Nicoletti	4–11
Troy Lee Designs Red Bull Gas Gas Factory Racing USA	Gas Gas	51	(United States) Justin Barcia	9–11
BarX Suzuki	Suzuki	53	(United States) Derek Drake	1–5, 7–11
Red Bull Motorsports BBR Motorsports	Yamaha	64	(United States) Carson Brown	8
ShopHenryMiller.com	Honda	66	(United States) Henry Miller	7
	KTM	70	(United States) Justin Rodbell	8–11
Team Solitaire Heartbeat Hot Sauce Yamaha	Yamaha	76	(Germany) Dominique Thury	3, 5–10
JCR Honda	Honda	77	(United States) Ryan Surratt	1–2
Manluk Rock River Racing	Yamaha	78	(United States) Grant Harlan	1–4, 6–11
Manluk Rock River Racing	Yamaha	174	(United States) Luca Marsalisi	1–5, 7–11
Moranz Mafia Red Line Letko KTM	KTM	80	(United States) Kevin Moranz	6–8, 11
Sports Clips Beachview Treatment Airline Vacuum	Kawasaki	81	(United States) Ty Masterpool	2–11
Basco Racing	Gas Gas	87	(United States) Chris Canning	6
Amerine Racing	Kawasaki	89	(United States) Kaeden Amerine	1–5
Silverback Racing	Kawasaki	90	(United States) Tristan Lane	1
Hand Racing	Honda	91	(United States) Jeremy Hand	3–5, 7–11
FCC Motosports	Yamaha	93	(United States) Jerry Robin	1–8, 11
Progressive Insurance ECSTAR Suzuki	Suzuki	94	(Germany) Ken Roczen	4
Wildcat Race Team	Gas Gas	103	(Venezuela) Lorenzo Locurcio	1–7
Wildcat Race Team	Gas Gas	107	(Spain) José Butrón	1–11
Wildcat Race Team	Gas Gas	109	(Venezuela) Raimundo Trasolini	10–11
Wildcat Race Team	Gas Gas	724	(Czech Republic) Jakub Terešák	9–10
Boost Mobile Honda Racing Team	Honda	104	(Australia) Jed Beaton	8
TPJ Fly Racing Team	Kawasaki	106	(France) Stephen Rubini	9–11
TPJ Fly Racing Team	Gas Gas	444	(France) Romain Pape	All
TPJ Fly Racing Team	KTM	746	(United States) Trevor Schmidt	2–9
TPJ Fly Racing Team	Kawasaki	767	(United States) Mason Wharton	1–2
Yamaha Monster Energy Geração	Yamaha	110	(Brazil) Gabriel Andrigo	10
MDK Motorsports	KTM	111	(Venezuela) Anthony Rodríguez	8, 11
PDR Motorsports VSR Racing Yamaha	Yamaha	113	(United States) Braden Spangle	8
Rocky Mountain ATV/MC Rides Unlimited	KTM	115	(United States) Jonah Geistler	11
Rocky Mountain ATV/MC Rides Unlimited	KTM	604	(United States) Max Miller	2–4, 6–11
3D Racing	Yamaha	116	(United States) TJ Albright	4–6, 9
	Honda	123	(United States) Kayden Palmer	1
	Yamaha	126	(United States) RJ Wageman	1–3, 8
One17 Suspension LetsRide Co	Honda	134	(United States) Chase Adams	1–3, 8
Southeast Sales	Kawasaki	136	(United States) Joshua Philbrick	7–8
HBI Racing	Kawasaki	137	(United States) Ayden Shive	4–5, 9, 11
HBI Racing	Husqvarna	411	(United States) Scott Meshey	All
HBI Racing	Kawasaki	427	(United States) Cole Bradford	2–5
LaPorte Racing	Yamaha	139	(United States) Nathen LaPorte	5, 7
Swapmoto Live	Yamaha	140	(United States) Alex Ray	1–5
EKS Brand	Yamaha	141	(United States) Richard Taylor	1–3, 8
Burgess Construction SYD Racing	Yamaha	143	(United States) Nicholas Burgess	4–7, 9–11
Smith Racing	KTM	145	(United States) Travis Smith	2
West Coast Concrete	Kawasaki	149	(United States) Chad Heishman	1–2, 8
FXR DECO Dirt Industries	KTM	155	(United States) Nathan Augustin	3–4
	Kawasaki	161	(United States) Dalton Holle	7
Concrete Plants Inc	Honda	162	(United States) Maxwell Sanford	1–3
	Honda	164	(United States) Matthew Klann	5
	Kawasaki	166	(United States) Wyatt Reimer	3, 7
Peeweecycle.com PW50 Performance	KTM	168	(United States) Cale Kuchnicki	5, 11
Kappeler Construction Inc. Chilton Auto Body	KTM	169	(United States) Dylan Kappeler	1–2
Motocross Action	Yamaha	171	(United States) Josh Mosiman	1
Motocross Action	Gas Gas	171	(United States) Josh Mosiman	2
Motocross Action	Honda	171	(United States) Josh Mosiman	3
DMC Motorsports	Yamaha	176	(United States) Brandon Green	3, 5, 7–8, 11
Team LMR	KTM	177	(United States) Tyler Stepek	2–3
Richard Racing	Gas Gas	179	(United States) Evan Richard	4
we1 Racing	Honda	190	(United States) Dominic DeSimone	1–2, 8
Ronnie Prado Company	Gas Gas	191	(United States) Curren Thurman	3
Beaver Creek Cycle	Kawasaki	193	(United States) Ryan Diezic	4–6, 9–11
	KTM	206	(United States) Griffin Dexter	1
Leitzel Racing	Kawasaki	208	(United States) Logan Leitzel	10–11
	KTM	209	(United States) Lucas Lamborn	1
Fast by Ben Schaeffer The Racer's Edge	Yamaha	211	(United States) Jason Fichera	6–7
SYD Racing	Yamaha	216	(United States) Grant Hoffman	5, 10–11
Triple Deuce MX	KTM	222	(United States) Brandon Hugney	3–4, 9–10
Let's Ride	Honda	226	(United States) Cameron Horner	1–3, 5, 7–8
Runkles Racing Ellicott City Motorsports	Gas Gas	227	(United States) Jacob Runkles	1–3
JMC Motosports	Gas Gas	230	(United States) Dylan Summerlin	8
JMC Motosports	Gas Gas	674	(United States) Tyler Hansen	8
Conway Racing	Kawasaki	231	(United States) Adam Conway	8
Grassroots MX	Honda	234	(United States) McCoy Brough	1, 3
Bushee Racing	Yamaha	236	(United States) Kyle Bushee	6, 9
Jetboy Co. BCMX Rutted Racing KTM	KTM	249	(United States) Bailey Kroone	3
	Yamaha	255	(United States) Kris Keefer	
Slo Joe Racing	Husqvarna	257	(United States) Joey DeNeen	4
Fratz-Orr Racing	KTM	265	(United States) Nick Fratz-Orr	4, 10
Honda of the Ozarks	Honda	266	(United States) Brett Greenley	3–4
Jeremiah's Pick Coffee L.D. Strobel Co	Yamaha	267	(United States) Robert Nalezny	1–2
Carsten Racing	Suzuki	281	(United States) Cory Carsten	1–3, 10–11
	Kawasaki	283	(United States) Aidan Dickens	7, 11
Thomas Motorsports Racing	Honda	287	(United States) John Snow	10
Dean's Racing	Yamaha	292	(United States) Kolton Dean	8
SBR Motorex FXR	KTM	295	(United States) Jack Pagano	6
Ronnie Prado Company	Honda	296	(United States) Ryder Floyd	7–11
Harrison Racing	Yamaha	297	(United States) Vincent Harrison	4, 10–11
Arma Sport	Yamaha	305	(United States) Jack Saggau	2, 8
Hunter Racing	Kawasaki	309	(United States) Jeremy Smith	3–4, 6, 9–10
Vickery Motosports Advance Concrete	Kawasaki	311	(United States) Mitchell Gifford	3
FDR Motorsports	KTM	312	(United States) Trevor Dunn	11
	Gas Gas	315	(United States) Cody Groves	All
Souhegen Valley Motorsports	Husqvarna	317	(United States) Richard Tolman-Moschetti	6
Showcase KTM	KTM	319	(United States) Devon Bates	1–5, 7–9
SC Sporthomes Husqvarna	Husqvarna	323	(United Kingdom) John Adamson	6–7, 9–11
SC Sporthomes Husqvarna	Husqvarna	591	(United Kingdom) Charlie Putnam	6–7, 9–11
Cooper Racing	Yamaha	324	(United States) James Cooper	4–5, 7, 11
Monty's Automotive	Yamaha	325	(United States) Robert Wilson	8
	Kawasaki	327	(United States) Alex Panzarella	4, 9
	Honda	336	(Canada) Derek Hamm	5
Team TAGMX	Kawasaki	342	(United States) Cory Broyles	6, 10
Custom MX Supply	Suzuki	345	(United States) Joshua Prior	6
MFR Racing	Yamaha	347	(United States) Mitchell Frantz	5, 9–11
JMR Suspension	Kawasaki	348	(United States) Jack Ferrell	8
Ajax Motorsports Redline Oil Kawasaki	Kawasaki	350	(United States) Chandler Baker	2, 4–7
Team 30 Plus	Husqvarna	358	(United States) Ivon Hays	4–5, 11
Robs Performance	Yamaha	365	(United States) Tyler Lowe	7–8
Farren Racing	Kawasaki	373	(United States) Kyle Farren	4, 10
	KTM	376	(United States) Thomas Welch	10–11
Complete Racing Solutions Munson Excavating	Kawasaki	382	(United States) Rylan Munson	3
Motoextreme Honda	Honda	387	(Estonia) Gert Krestinov	6
The Bud Builders LLC Blood Money Racing	Honda	388	(United States) Brandon Ray	1–8
Kutzler Express Inc. Woodstock KTM	KTM	395	(United States) Dustin Sikorski	3, 7, 11
OBS Solutions	KTM	396	(United States) Zach Rawlins	8
Motostar Racing	Husqvarna	397	(Sweden) Anton Gole	6–10
Poet Motorcycles OpX Networks	KTM	407	(United States) Jay Olsen	2, 8
4-State Moto Complex	KTM	410	(United States) Brandon Scharer	5–7
Blud Lubricants	Yamaha	412	(United States) Jared Lesher	4–5, 10–11
Grgurich Racing	Yamaha	415	(United States) Brendan Grgurich	7
AEO Maxima Fasthouse	KTM	417	(United States) Dylan Gaszak	1
True MX Vert MX Graphics	Honda	418	(United States) Zach Peters	4–5, 9–11
	Gas Gas	419	(United States) Kyle Petrie	5
Fisk Tree Service	Husqvarna	423	(United States) Matthew Fisk	6
Dirt Bike Magazine	Honda	429	(United States) Justin Jones	1–2
Honda Kawasaki KTM of Modesto	Kawasaki	433	(United States) Anthony Gonsalves	8
	Yamaha	434	(United States) Bryce Shelly	4–5, 9–11
Luhovey Racing	Honda	437	(United States) Vincent Luhovey	4–6, 9–11
Thurston Racing	Yamaha	438	(United States) Cameron Thurston	6
	KTM	440	(United States) Austin Kapoukranidis	9–10
Razees Fox Factory Connection	KTM	442	(United States) Zachary Johnson	6
Dreamland MX Racing	Husqvarna	443	(United States) Luke Renzland	6, 9–10
Gdogg Racing Yamaha	Yamaha	445	(United States) Noah Miesen	7
Kessler Pro Suspension	Yamaha	449	(United States) Dakota Kessler	4
Forever Two Wheels Pacific Coast Construction	Kawasaki	450	(United States) Brad Burkhart	2, 8
Bruce Enterprises Kang Racing	Honda	452	(Canada) Rylan Bly	4–5
SRC NWEC KTM	KTM	454	(United States) Layton Smail	1, 8
Jay's Autosound Cinch Cycling	Honda	457	(United States) Rashidi Kerrison	9
Team Jit Loader	Kawasaki	458	(United States) Brent Burkhart	2
Walker Racing	Honda	468	(United States) Austin Walker	4–5
	Gas Gas	469	(Italy) Giacomo Redondi	1
RF Motorsports USA	Yamaha	476	(United States) Collin Jurin	8
Harazin and Sons	Honda	477	(United States) Mitchell Prescott	2, 5, 7
M9 Suspension Fly Racing Guts Racing	Yamaha	480	(United States) Ashton Oudman	2, 8
Tuna Fish Racing	Yamaha	481	(United States) Jonah Schmidt	1–2, 8
Carroll Racing	Yamaha	483	(United States) Bryton Carroll	1–6, 9–10
Robs Performance Motorsports	KTM	486	(United States) Dennis Gritzmacher	5, 7, 11
	KTM	488	(United States) Travis Randanella	10
Randanella Septic Inc.	Kawasaki	489	(United States) Ricci Randanella	4–6, 9
SOE	KTM	491	(United States) Gabe Gutierres	1–4, 6
KTM Canada Red Bull Race Team	KTM	493	(Canada) Jess Pettis	11
KDR	Yamaha	495	(United States) Judson Wisdom	5
No Ego Life Moto541	Gas Gas	497	(United States) Josh Lee	8
Chesnut Racing	Kawasaki	499	(United States) Dawson Chesnut	11
	Kawasaki	505	(United States) Nicholas Peccarelli	4, 6, 9–10
RPE Waste Service Majcher Builders	KTM	507	(United States) Thomas Lanphear	4, 9
	Honda	510	(United States) Travis Prier	7, 11
OnlyFans Kessler Concrete ATeam Honda	Honda	511	(United States) Jace Kessler	All
Triangle Cycles Sheds Galore	Kawasaki	512	(United States) Austin Cozadd	10–11
Roth Racing	Yamaha	514	(United States) Anthony Roth	4, 9–10
	Yamaha	517	(United States) Ty Freehill	1–2, 7–8
Pro Action Suspension Ford of Uniontown	Kawasaki	520	(United States) Jimmy Knisley	4
Stepek Logistics	Yamaha	522	(Netherlands) Rob Windt	7, 9–10
	Yamaha	526	(United States) Nicholas Laurie	10–11
Team Hammer	Yamaha	527	(United States) Matthew Hammer	6
Full Throttle Motorsports	Kawasaki	528	(United States) Ryan Peters	5, 7–8
Kean Construction	KTM	530	(United States) Dawson Draycott	3, 6–7, 9–10
	Honda	531	(United States) Tayler Grall	3, 5, 7, 11
Basic Moto Co. Feine Tune Fastline MX	KTM	536	(United States) Gavin Tilford	3, 5, 7
VPE Yamaha	Yamaha	538	(United States) Addison Emory IV	1
Honda Canada GDR Fox Racing	Honda	539	(Canada) Dylan Wright	10–11
Snirt Racing	Yamaha	544	(United States) Noah Willbrandt	5, 11
JSR Prepared	Yamaha	545	(United States) Cody Siler	11
Becker Racing	Yamaha	547	(United States) Chase Becker	3, 5, 7
Perri's Powersports Defy Graphics	Suzuki	550	(United States) John Citrola	
Brasil Racing	Kawasaki	555	(Brazil) Heberton Lima	6, 9–10
Underground RC	KTM	561	(United States) Caleb Hall	9
	KTM	563	(United States) Dante Oliveira	1
Rose Racing	KTM	566	(United States) Jacob Rose	4
Branded Fence Exchange	KTM	568	(United States) Crockett Myers	7, 9–11
The Ranch at Carlisle	KTM	569	(United States) James Slaughter Jr	6, 9
JAG Racing	Gas Gas	570	(United States) Jason Gepford	7, 11
DH1 Mods SRS Suspension	Yamaha	572	(United States) Chase Witmer	4–5, 11
Scotty T Golf Carts Wayne Cycles	Husqvarna	575	(United States) Cory Rogers	6
Mexican Power	Husqvarna	577	(Mexico) Félix López	4–6
Motobros	KTM	580	(United States) Dustin Jensen	5–6
Reekers Mods	KTM	586	(United States) Nick Reekers	7
	Kawasaki	588	(United States) Eddie Norred	7, 11
RMXseries.com	KTM	594	(United States) Morgan Burger	8
Kyle Owen Photography	Yamaha	595	(United States) Michael Kitzmiller	5, 7, 11
Legend Services Racing	KTM	599	(United States) Bryant Humiston	8
Moto Spot Show Racing	Gas Gas	600	(United States) Connor Olson	1–2, 8
Risk Racing	Yamaha	611	(United States) Justin Thompson	4
Vid Racing	Honda	615	(United States) Kyle Vidovich	4
Wilkins Racing	Kawasaki	616	(United States) Gavin Wilkins	7
EVO Billdog Racing	Honda	617	(United States) Hayden Cordell	2, 8
FMK	Suzuki	618	(United States) Talon Gorman	1
Triangle Cycles Danville Virginia	Yamaha	621	(United States) Bennett Mantooth	7, 9–11
Wolfworx Yamaha	Yamaha	622	(United States) Zac Maley	11
Roundhouse Powersports MXtire.com	Honda	624	(United States) Garrett Smith	4
Heartbeat Hot Sauce Venshore Mechanical	Honda	638	(Canada) Lucas Giardino	5, 7, 9
Evo Bill Dog Racing Southbound Honda	Honda	641	(United States) Tommy Flora	1, 8
SSB Motorsports	Gas Gas	644	(United States) Brennan Myers	7
Powerhouse Farms Fanelli Equipment	Gas Gas	645	(United States) Colby Copp	1–2
SC Precision Scranton Craftsmen Ride JBI	Honda	649	(United States) Corey Burnett	4–6, 9
	Gas Gas	654	(Canada) Vincent Lauzon	5, 9
GFR	Husqvarna	662	(United States) James Gall	7
Stempel Racing	Husqvarna	664	(United States) Hunter Stempel	3, 5, 9
Miserable Clothing Reekers Mods	KTM	666	(United States) Collin Hinrichs	5, 7
	Yamaha	669	(United States) Liam Langer	4, 6, 9–10
Nor-Cal Motorsports Crew	KTM	671	(United States) Tyler Ducray	1–2
	Yamaha	672	(United States) Brandon Pederson	1, 3–5
Central Collision Repair	Honda	673	(United States) Landon Armbruster	4, 11
	Husqvarna	679	(United States) Nicholas O'Neill	6
Storm Lake Honda	Honda	682	(United States) Izaih Clark	5, 7
Storm Lake Honda	Honda	942	(United States) Deegan Hepp	7
Stewarts Heating Racing	Kawasaki	688	(United States) Brandan Leith	3
McLaud Racing	KTM	692	(United States) Brett McLaud	7
MPH Honda Deep Hollow Ranch WMXtreme Pro Services	Honda	696	(United States) Nick Kraeger	4
	Husqvarna	704	(Estonia) Tanel Leok	9
Sharpe Racing	Honda	714	(United States) CJ Hall	9–10
Crosley Radio RiderSurance	Yamaha	716	(United States) Jacob Baumert	11
Unleashed Tech Service Racing	Gas Gas	717	(United States) William Clark	4–6
Grant Taylor Vlogs	Yamaha	718	(United States) Grant Taylor	
Galasso Landscaping Yamaha	KTM	719	(United States) Joshua Berchem	6
FDR Motosports	Honda	720	(United States) Jordon Fancher	1–3, 5
AWOL Racing	Yamaha	721	(United States) Nathan Murphy	6, 9–11
Nelko Racing	Kawasaki	723	(United States) Benjamin Nelko	11
Lonesome Camel Farms	Husqvarna	726	(United States) Gared Steinke	8
McBride Racing	KTM	732	(United States) Josh McBride	8
Warren Racing	Yamaha	735	(United States) Jake Warren	2, 8
Inclusive Excursions	Gas Gas	737	(United States) Zachary Butkiewicz	6, 8, 10
Creative Sports Concepts	Yamaha	740	(United States) Sebastian Balbuena	5–6, 9–10
Tri City Cycle Performance Equipment	Yamaha	747	(United States) Cody Gray	3
	Yamaha	748	(Venezuela) Carlos Badiali	9–11
Hart and Huntington	Yamaha	751	(United States) Josh Hill	8, 11
CML KTM	KTM	753	(New Zealand) Hamish Harwood	8
Big St Charles Novik Route 15	KTM	757	(United States) Tyler Gosnell	5, 11
760 Design Delmarva Power Sports	Yamaha	760	(United States) Tyler Wozney	6
Motosport SGB Racing Men at Work Landscaping	Yamaha	763	(United States) James Henshaw	10
765 On Track Training	Husqvarna	765	(United States) Zack Archer	7
Motorsports Nation	Yamaha	766	(United States) Maurice Healy	6
Shondeck Racing	Suzuki	768	(United States) Cole Shondeck	3, 5–7
Altus Motorsports	Kawasaki	772	(United States) Terren O'Dell	3
	Honda	776	(United States) Seamus Sullivan	4, 6, 9
Tech Service Racing	Yamaha	777	(United States) James Harrington	3
Tech Service Racing	KTM	856	(United States) Scott Iverson	6
KMP Honda powered by Krettek	Honda	787	(Netherlands) Lars van Berkel	5–6
X-Pro Motorsports	Gas Gas	798	(United States) Billy Ainsworth	1–4, 6, 9
Mason Agency Ryan's Tree Service	Kawasaki	802	(United States) Marshall Macintyre	6
Williams Racing	Suzuki	811	(United States) Christopher Williams	7
Barry Racing	Yamaha	818	(United States) James Barry	10
South of the Border MX	Yamaha	820	(United States) Matthew Burkeen	All
Factory Moto Kids	Suzuki	821	(United States) Jeffrey Gorman	1–2, 8
Rip Motorsports	Kawasaki	822	(United States) Riley Ripper	1–3, 7
	Gas Gas	825	(United States) Noah Adams	3
Daystar Builders Division Suspension and Engine	Honda	826	(United States) Trent Yoder	4–5
Watachi Racing Fun Country KTM	KTM	828	(United States) Chase Larson	8
FedEx	Gas Gas	830	(United States) Ezra Lewis	1–5, 7, 9–11
	KTM	831	(United States) Jacob Glenn	4, 6
TPR Klim Edelmann Racing	KTM	834	(United States) Kristopher Corey	5–6, 9
No Limits Freedom Cycle Suzuki	Suzuki	838	(United States) Benjamin Robinson	6
Walker Motorsports	KTM	841	(United States) Jeffrey Walker	1–7, 9
O'Neil Racing	KTM	845	(United States) Bryan O'Neil	8
Clearview Auto Glass	Yamaha	851	(United States) Neal Allen	2–3, 8
Fusion Motorsports	KTM	874	(United States) Zack Williams	3–5, 7, 9–11
HGX Graphics	Gas Gas	878	(United States) Eric McKay	10
FXR Racing Luft Trailer Sales	Kawasaki	880	(United States) Tyler Maddox	8
MCR JNKYARD Designs	Yamaha	881	(United States) Gerald Lorenz III	11
Ballards Organics PCP Motorsports	Yamaha	888	(United States) Blake Ballard	2
	Yamaha	891	(United States) Kyle Koosmann	3, 7
Uebrick Racing	Husqvarna	899	(United States) Kevin Uebrick	6, 9
AEO Powersports Factory Connection Split Design	KTM	901	(United States) Brayden Lessler	
Iowa Pump Works	KTM	905	(United States) Lucas Lockhart	5, 7
909 Motors	Yamaha	909	(United States) Ryan Wadsworth	6
	Yamaha	911	(Germany) Maik Schaller	4
Roseville Yamaha Haeseker Racing	Yamaha	917	(United States) Drew Thomas	2, 8
Hayes Racing	Kawasaki	918	(United States) Nicholas Hayes	4
Ephrata Cycle & Sports KB5 Industries	Honda	925	(United States) Lowell Spangler	4
Beaverton Motorcycles	KTM	926	(United States) Robert Martin	1–2, 8
DeWitt Custom Concrete	Yamaha	927	(United States) Shane Kehoe	10
	Honda	928	(United States) Bryce Hammond	1–10
Tech Service Racing Team	Yamaha	931	(France) Adrien Malaval	9–10
Express Racing Team	KTM	932	(Estonia) Karel Kutsar	6
Talbott Racing	Yamaha	940	(United States) Evan Talbott	4–7, 9–11
Leatherman Compound	Yamaha	944	(United States) Derek Leatherman	4–6, 9–10
Docs Motorcycles Chug's Moto Performance	KTM	945	(United States) Jacob Pogodzienski	6
Murphy Racing	Husqvarna	951	(United States) Kyle Murphy	1–2
BBL Racing	Yamaha	953	(Estonia) Harri Kullas	9–11
	Yamaha	955	(United States) Jayden Shindel	10
TnT Racing	KTM	959	(United States) Ryan Tolsma	5
Gary Bailey MX Schools	Kawasaki	961	(United States) Mario Testa	6
	Yamaha	965	(United States) Cody Griffin	9, 11
	Husqvarna	972	(United States) Nicholas Niles	6, 9
Ferrotherm Racing Team	Husqvarna	973	(Germany) Philipp Klakow	1–2
Maus Racing	KTM	979	(United States) Philip Maus	7, 9
Olson Racing	Yamaha	982	(United States) Skylar Olson	3, 8
	Gas Gas	985	(United States) Pat McLam	8
East Side Dogs	Honda	993	(United States) Jakob Rassa	1, 4, 10
Sanchez Racing Team	KTM	994	(United States) Juan Sanchez	6
Team Imperial	KTM	995	(United States) Christopher Prebula	1–2, 4–9
Yankton Motorsports	Kawasaki	996	(United States) Preston Taylor	7

=== Riders Championship ===
Pos	Rider	Bike	FOX (California)		HAN (California)		THU (Colorado)		HIG (Pennsylvania)		RED (Michigan)		SOU (Massachusetts)		SPR (Minnesota)		WAS (Washington (state))		UNA (New York (state))		BUD (Maryland)		IRN (Indiana)		Points
1	(Australia) Jett Lawrence	Honda	1	1	1	1	1	1	1	1	1	1	1	1	1	1	1	1	1	1	1	1	1	1	550
2	(France) Dylan Ferrandis	Yamaha	3	3	2	3	7	3	6	3	3	2	3	3	5	3	3	5	2	3	3	9	3	Ret	399
3	(United States) Aaron Plessinger	KTM	5	4	3	6	4	2	8	5	4	4	4	4	4	4	7	3	5	5	4	3	5	3	386
4	(United States) Chase Sexton	Honda	2	2							2	3	2	2	2	2	2	2	3	2	9	2	2	2	338
5	(United States) Adam Cianciarulo	Kawasaki	6	7	5	4	3	6	4	4	Ret	6	7	8	7	5	5	7	4	6	7	6	6	6	328
6	(United States) Garrett Marchbanks	Yamaha					6	8	2	8	9	5	10	5	6	8	8	6	6	10	6	8	7	8	255
7	(United States) Ty Masterpool	Kawasaki			7	7	5	4	5	7	6	Ret	5	10	8	6	6	8	9	8	8	7	DNS	DNS	242
8	(Sweden) Fredrik Norén	Suzuki	13	9	6	15	10	10	14	10	7	8	15	11	10	9	9	11	13	9	13	10	22	10	219
9	(United States) Jason Anderson	Kawasaki									5	7	6	14	3	Ret	4	4	14	4	2	5	4	4	207
10	(United States) Grant Harlan	Yamaha	9	6	19	Ret	8	7	11	9			22	9	9	7	14	15	15	11	11	14	14	14	176
11	(Spain) José Butrón	Gas Gas	10	8	16	5	21	17	23	20	11	10	9	6	15	10	12	13	17	19	22	17	Ret	11	152
12	(United States) Cooper Webb	KTM	4	5	4	2	2	5	3	6															147
13	(United States) Phil Nicoletti	Yamaha							12	21	10	9	11	16	13	12	11	9	8	Ret	10	11	12	7	143
14	(Venezuela) Lorenzo Locurcio	Gas Gas	7	11	9	11	12	9	13	11	8	Ret	17	13	Ret	DNS									110
15	(United States) Derek Drake	Suzuki	Ret	10	8	8	9	12	9	12	Ret	16			25	20	Ret	Ret	12	34	21	28	28	26	94
16	(United States) Kyle Chisholm	Suzuki	12	13	12	13	23	14					14	17	14	11	17	12	18	15	Ret	24			91
17	(France) Romain Pape	Gas Gas	23	16	14	10	14	13	10	13	Ret	Ret	23	19	Ret	15	16	18	33	13	20	19	Ret	15	90
18	(United States) Jerry Robin	Yamaha	8	14	10	9	17	19	Ret	17	Ret	Ret	13	Ret	34	13	Ret	Ret					Ret	Ret	69
19	(United States) Justin Barcia	Gas Gas																	Ret	14	5	4	11	5	67
20	(Estonia) Harri Kullas	Yamaha																	7	7	12	12	9	12	67
21	(United States) Jeremy Hand	Honda					19	16	15	14	14	14			18	18	23	Ret	11	16	Ret	21	16	16	65
22	(United States) Luca Marsalisi	Yamaha	18	18	27	24	15	18	27	19	17	11			16	14	22	23	29	24	18	25	29	Ret	46
23	(Germany) Ken Roczen	Suzuki							7	2															36
24	(United States) Bryce Shelly	Yamaha							20	24	15	12							10	20	DNQ	DNQ	15	20	35
25	(United States) Jace Kessler	Honda	17	23	25	16	32	Ret	30	32	12	15	DNQ	DNQ	28	21	30	Ret	24	25	17	18	18	24	34
26	(United States) Ryan Surratt	Honda	11	17	11	12																			33
27	(United States) Marshal Weltin	Suzuki	31	15	15	Ret	11	11																	32
28	(United States) Shane McElrath	Yamaha													11	Ret	15	14					25	13	31
29	(Sweden) Anton Gole	Husqvarna											20	DNS	17	17	20	19	16	21	15	15			29
30	(United States) Chris Canning	Gas Gas											8	7											27
31	(France) Stephen Rubini	Kawasaki																	20	17	16	13	13	Ret	26
32	(United States) Max Miller	KTM			26	28	20	15	22	15			33	32	19	Ret	19	16	28	27	30	Ret	24	17	26
33	(Canada) Dylan Wright	Honda																			Ret	DNS	8	9	25
34	(United States) Brandon Ray	Honda	19	24	21	14	38	20	18	16	16	Ret	Ret	Ret	27	26	Ret	Ret							23
35	(United States) Colt Nichols	Kawasaki															10	10					Ret	Ret	22
36	(Australia) Jay Wilson	Yamaha																	23	12	14	16	DNS	DNS	21
37	(Netherlands) Lars van Berkel	Honda									19	13	16	15											21
38	(Estonia) Gert Krestinov	Honda											12	12											18
39	(United States) Kaeden Amerine	Kawasaki	14	20	28	Ret	16	21	16	Ret	Ret	DNS													18
40	(United States) Dante Oliveira	KTM	15	12																					15
41	(United States) Chandler Baker	Kawasaki			17	Ret			26	18	13	Ret	Ret	DNS	36	Ret									15
42	(United States) Christopher Prebula	KTM	21	19	13	Ret			19	Ret	Ret	Ret	Ret	DNS	24	Ret	DNQ	DNQ	34	Ret					12
43	(Canada) Jess Pettis	KTM																					10	Ret	11
44	(United States) Tyler Stepek	KTM			18	Ret	13	Ret																	11
45	(United States) Henry Miller	Honda													12	Ret									9
46	(Australia) Jed Beaton	Honda															13	Ret							8
47	(United States) Kevin Moranz	KTM											29	22	26	16	28	26					19	25	7
48	(United States) Brandon Scharer	KTM									18	17	Ret	Ret	Ret	Ret									7
49	(United States) Josh Hill	Yamaha															26	17					31	19	6
50	(United States) RJ Wageman	Yamaha	16	33	22	25	33	31									27	25							5
51	(United States) Vincent Luhovey	Honda							21	Ret	23	21	31	Ret					26	26	31	27	17	21	4
52	(United States) Trevor Schmidt	KTM			DNQ	DNQ	22	30	17	22	25	23	26	Ret	DNQ	DNQ	29	Ret	DNQ	DNQ					4
53	(United States) Jacob Runkles	Gas Gas	27	29	29	17	Ret	DNS																	4
54	(United States) Luke Renzland	Husqvarna											18	20					21	22	23	Ret			4
55	(United Kingdom) John Adamson	Husqvarna											19	24	22	19			27	31	24	23	26	23	4
56	(United States) Carson Brown	Yamaha															18	21							3
57	(United States) Bryce Hammond	Honda	Ret	21	DNQ	DNQ	18	22	DNQ	DNQ	DNQ	DNQ	DNQ	28	DNQ	DNQ	DNQ	DNQ	DNQ	DNQ	DNQ	DNQ			3
58	(Germany) Dominique Thury	Yamaha					25	32			21	18	30	25	DNQ	28	33	27	DNQ	DNQ	Ret	Ret			3
59	(Estonia) Tanel Leok	Husqvarna																	22	18					3
60	(Estonia) Karel Kutsar	KTM											24	18											3
61	(United States) Zack Williams	KTM					30	27	DNQ	DNQ	DNQ	DNQ			30	24			30	33	27	26	27	18	3
62	(United States) Cody Groves	Gas Gas	DNQ	DNQ	36	18	37	Ret	29	28	Ret	26	25	33	DNQ	DNQ	DNQ	DNQ	35	32	Ret	30	DNQ	DNQ	3
63	(United States) Scott Meshey	Husqvarna	28	Ret	Ret	19	DNQ	DNQ	31	25	20	Ret	Ret	Ret	21	29	Ret	Ret	36	DNS	33	32	32	Ret	3
64	(United States) Justin Rodbell	KTM															31	29	31	30	19	22	20	28	3
65	(United States) Izaih Clark	Honda									24	19			20	DNS									3
66	(United States) Ryder Floyd	Honda													23	22	25	DNS	19	29	DNQ	DNQ	21	22	2
67	(Venezuela) Anthony Rodríguez	KTM															21	20					23	Ret	1
68	(United States) Sebastian Balbuena	Yamaha									27	20	27	21					32	Ret	28	Ret			1
69	(United States) Jeffrey Walker	KTM	30	26	24	20	26	24	28	30	Ret	DNS	28	23	29	Ret			DNQ	DNQ					1
70	(Czech Republic) Jakub Terešák	Gas Gas																	25	23	25	20			1
71	(United States) Bryton Carroll	Yamaha	24	30	20	Ret	29	Ret	Ret	27	DNQ	Ret	32	Ret					DNQ	DNQ	DNQ	DNQ			1
72	(United States) Richard Taylor	Yamaha	20	Ret	DNQ	DNQ	DNQ	DNQ									DNQ	DNQ							1
	(United States) Alex Ray	Yamaha	22	25	23	21	Ret	Ret	35	Ret	DNQ	DNQ													0
	(United States) Ricci Randanella	Kawasaki							32	26	DNQ	DNQ	21	30					DNQ	DNQ					0
	(United States) Ayden Shive	Kawasaki							33	23	26	22							DNQ	DNQ			DNQ	DNQ	0
	(New Zealand) Hamish Harwood	Husqvarna															24	22							0
	(United States) Ezra Lewis	Gas Gas	DNQ	DNQ	30	22	DNQ	DNQ	DNQ	DNQ	DNQ	DNQ			DNQ	DNQ			DNQ	DNQ	DNQ	DNQ	DNQ	DNQ	0
	(Mexico) Félix López	Husqvarna							DNQ	DNQ	22	Ret	DNQ	DNQ											0
	(United States) Tristan Lane	Kawasaki	Ret	22																					0
	(United States) Jeremy Smith	Kawasaki					24	23	25	29			Ret	27					37	35	32	33			0
	(United States) Josh Mosiman	Yamaha	33	28																					0
	(United States) Josh Mosiman	Gas Gas			32	23																			0
	(United States) Josh Mosiman	Honda					31	34																	0
	(United States) Dawson Draycott	KTM					36	29					34	31	32	23			DNQ	DNQ	DNQ	DNQ			0
	(United States) Jared Lesher	Yamaha							24	31	Ret	Ret									DNQ	DNQ	Ret	29	0
	(United States) Gared Steinke	Husqvarna															Ret	24							0
	(United States) TJ Albright	Yamaha							DNQ	DNQ	DNQ	24	DNQ	DNQ					DNQ	DNQ					0
	(United States) Cameron Horner	Honda	26	36	DNQ	DNQ	DNQ	DNQ			DNQ	DNQ			33	25	DNQ	DNQ							0
	(United States) McCoy Brough	Honda	DNQ	DNQ			27	25																	0
	(United States) Nathen LaPorte	Yamaha									29	25			DNQ	DNQ									0
	(United States) Gabe Gutierres	KTM	25	Ret	DNQ	DNQ	DNQ	DNQ	DNQ	DNQ			DNQ	DNQ											0
	(United States) Crockett Myers	KTM													35	Ret			DNQ	36	26	34	30	27	0
	(United States) Matthew Burkeen	Yamaha	32	31	34	26	34	28	Ret	Ret	Ret	Ret	DNQ	DNQ	DNQ	DNQ	DNQ	DNQ	DNQ	DNQ	DNQ	DNQ	DNQ	DNQ	0
	(United States) Brandan Leith	Kawasaki					28	26																	0
	(United States) Kristopher Corey	KTM									DNQ	DNQ	DNQ	26					DNQ	DNQ					0
	(United States) Maxwell Sanford	Honda	34	27	31	27	DNQ	DNQ																	0
	(United States) Judson Wisdom	Yamaha									28	27													0
	(United Kingdom) Charlie Putnam	Husqvarna											DNQ	DNQ	31	27			DNQ	DNQ	29	29	DNQ	DNQ	0
	(United States) Noah Willbrandt	Yamaha									30	28											DNQ	DNQ	0
	(United States) Collin Jurin	Yamaha															32	28							0
	(France) Adrien Malaval	Yamaha																	Ret	28	34	36			0
	(United States) Ashton Oudman	Yamaha			37	29											DNQ	DNQ							0
	(Italy) Giacomo Redondi	Gas Gas	29	Ret																					0
	(United States) Matthew Hammer	Yamaha											DNQ	29											0
	(United States) Hayden Cordell	Honda			DNQ	DNQ											34	30							0
	(United States) Eddie Norred	Kawasaki													DNQ	DNQ							34	30	0
	(United States) Preston Taylor	Kawasaki													Ret	30									0
	(United States) Logan Leitzel	Kawasaki																			DNQ	DNQ	DNQ	31	0
	(United States) Cory Carsten	Suzuki	DNQ	DNQ	33	Ret	DNQ	DNQ													DNQ	31	DNQ	DNQ	0
	(United States) Robert Martin	KTM	Ret	DNS	DNQ	DNQ											35	31							0
	(United States) Travis Prier	Honda													DNQ	31							DNQ	DNQ	0
	(United States) Dominic DeSimone	Honda	DNQ	32	DNQ	DNQ											DNQ	DNQ							0
	(United States) Billy Ainsworth	Gas Gas	DNQ	DNQ	DNQ	DNQ	DNQ	33	36	Ret			DNQ	DNQ					DNQ	DNQ					0
	(United States) Dakota Kessler	Yamaha							Ret	33															0
	(United States) Jacob Baumert	Yamaha																					33	DNS	0
	(United States) Lowell Spangler	Honda							34	34															0
	(United States) Ty Freehill	Yamaha	36	34	38	Ret									DNQ	DNQ	DNQ	DNQ							0
	(United States) Kayden Palmer	Honda	35	35																					0
	(United States) Terren O'Dell	Kawasaki					35	35																	0
	(United States) Colby Copp	Gas Gas	DNQ	DNQ	35	Ret																			0
	(Venezuela) Raimundo Trasolini	Gas Gas																			Ret	35	Ret	DNS	0
	(Netherlands) Rob Windt	Yamaha													DNQ	DNQ			Ret	37	DNQ	DNQ			0
	(United States) Tyler Ducray	KTM	DNQ	DNQ	39	Ret																			0
	(United States) Ryan Diezic	Kawasaki							DNQ	DNQ	DNQ	DNQ	DNQ	DNQ					DNQ	DNQ	DNQ	DNQ	DNQ	Ret	0
	(United States) Devon Bates	KTM	DNQ	DNQ	DNQ	DNQ	DNQ	DNQ	DNQ	DNQ	DNQ	DNQ			DNQ	DNQ	DNQ	DNQ	DNQ	DNQ					0
	(United States) Evan Talbott	Yamaha							DNQ	DNQ	DNQ	DNQ	DNQ	DNQ	DNQ	DNQ			DNQ	DNQ	DNQ	DNQ	DNQ	DNQ	0
	(United States) Nicholas Burgess	Yamaha							DNQ	DNQ	DNQ	DNQ	DNQ	DNQ	DNQ	DNQ			DNQ	DNQ	DNQ	DNQ	DNQ	DNQ	0
	(United States) Brandon Green	Yamaha					DNQ	DNQ			DNQ	DNQ			DNQ	DNQ	DNQ	DNQ					DNQ	DNQ	0
	(United States) Derek Leatherman	Yamaha							DNQ	DNQ	DNQ	DNQ	DNQ	DNQ					DNQ	DNQ	DNQ	DNQ			0
	(United States) Zach Peters	Honda							DNQ	DNQ	DNQ	DNQ							DNQ	DNQ	DNQ	DNQ	DNQ	DNQ	0
	(United States) Jordon Fancher	Honda	DNQ	DNQ	DNQ	DNQ	DNQ	DNQ			DNQ	DNQ													0
	(United States) Riley Ripper	Kawasaki	DNQ	DNQ	DNQ	DNQ	DNQ	DNQ							DNQ	DNQ									0
	(United States) Chase Adams	Honda	DNQ	DNQ	DNQ	DNQ	DNQ	DNQ									DNQ	DNQ							0
	(United States) Brandon Pederson	Yamaha	DNQ	DNQ			DNQ	DNQ	DNQ	DNQ	DNQ	DNQ													0
	(United States) Cole Bradford	Kawasaki			DNQ	DNQ	DNQ	DNQ	DNQ	DNQ	DNQ	DNQ													0
	(United States) Brandon Hugney	KTM					DNQ	DNQ	DNQ	DNQ									DNQ	DNQ	DNQ	DNQ			0
	(United States) Cole Shondeck	Suzuki					DNQ	DNQ			DNQ	DNQ	DNQ	DNQ	DNQ	DNQ									0
	(United States) Tayler Grall	Honda					DNQ	DNQ			DNQ	DNQ			DNQ	DNQ							DNQ	DNQ	0
	(United States) Corey Burnett	Honda							DNQ	DNQ	DNQ	DNQ	DNQ	DNQ					DNQ	DNQ					0
	(United States) James Cooper	Yamaha							DNQ	DNQ	DNQ	DNQ			DNQ	DNQ							DNQ	DNQ	0
	(United States) Liam Langer	Yamaha							DNQ	DNQ			DNQ	DNQ					DNQ	DNQ	DNQ	DNQ			0
	(United States) Nicholas Peccarelli	Kawasaki							DNQ	DNQ			DNQ	DNQ					DNQ	DNQ	DNQ	DNQ			0
	(United States) Mitchell Frantz	Yamaha									DNQ	DNQ							DNQ	DNQ	DNQ	DNQ	DNQ	DNQ	0
	(United States) Nathan Murphy	Yamaha											DNQ	DNQ					DNQ	DNQ	DNQ	DNQ	DNQ	DNQ	0
	(United States) Bennett Mantooth	Yamaha													DNQ	DNQ			DNQ	DNQ	DNQ	DNQ	DNQ	DNQ	0
	(United States) Connor Olson	Gas Gas	DNQ	DNQ	DNQ	DNQ											DNQ	DNQ							0
	(United States) Chad Heishman	Kawasaki	DNQ	DNQ	DNQ	DNQ											DNQ	DNQ							0
	(United States) Jonah Schmidt	Yamaha	DNQ	DNQ	DNQ	DNQ											DNQ	DNQ							0
	(United States) Jeffrey Gorman	Suzuki	DNQ	DNQ	DNQ	DNQ											DNQ	DNQ							0
	(United States) Jakob Rassa	Honda	DNQ	DNQ					DNQ	DNQ											DNQ	DNQ			0
	(United States) Neal Allen	Yamaha			DNQ	DNQ	DNQ	DNQ									DNQ	DNQ							0
	(United States) Mitchell Prescott	Honda			DNQ	DNQ					DNQ	DNQ			DNQ	DNQ									0
	(United States) Chase Becker	Yamaha					DNQ	DNQ			DNQ	DNQ			DNQ	DNQ									0
	(United States) Gavin Tilford	KTM					DNQ	DNQ			DNQ	DNQ			DNQ	DNQ									0
	(United States) Hunter Stempel	Husqvarna					DNQ	DNQ			DNQ	DNQ							DNQ	DNQ					0
	(United States) Dustin Sikorski	KTM					DNQ	DNQ							DNQ	DNQ							DNQ	DNQ	0
	(United States) William Clark	Gas Gas							DNQ	DNQ	DNQ	DNQ	DNQ	DNQ											0
	(United States) Chase Witmer	Yamaha							DNQ	DNQ	DNQ	DNQ											DNQ	DNQ	0
	(United States) Ivon Hays	Husqvarna							DNQ	DNQ	DNQ	DNQ											DNQ	DNQ	0
	(United States) Seamus Sullivan	Honda							DNQ	DNQ			DNQ	DNQ					DNQ	DNQ					0
	(United States) Anthony Roth	Yamaha							DNQ	DNQ									DNQ	DNQ	DNQ	DNQ			0
	(United States) Vincent Harrison	Yamaha							DNQ	DNQ											DNQ	DNQ	DNQ	DNQ	0
	(United States) Ryan Peters	Kawasaki									DNQ	DNQ			DNQ	DNQ	DNQ	DNQ							0
	(Canada) Lucas Giardino	Honda									DNQ	DNQ			DNQ	DNQ			DNQ	DNQ					0
	(United States) Dennis Gritzmacher	KTM									DNQ	DNQ			DNQ	DNQ							DNQ	DNQ	0
	(United States) Michael Kitzmiller	Yamaha									DNQ	DNQ			DNQ	DNQ							DNQ	DNQ	0
	(United States) Grant Hoffman	Yamaha									DNQ	DNQ									DNQ	DNQ	DNQ	DNQ	0
	(United States) Zachary Butkiewicz	Gas Gas											DNQ	DNQ			DNQ	DNQ			DNQ	DNQ			0
	(Brazil) Heberton Lima	Kawasaki											DNQ	DNQ					DNQ	DNQ	DNQ	DNQ			0
	(Venezuela) Carlos Badiali	Yamaha																	DNQ	DNQ	DNQ	DNQ	DNQ	DNQ	0
	(United States) Justin Jones	Honda	DNQ	DNQ	DNQ	DNQ																			0
	(United States) Dylan Kappeler	KTM	DNQ	DNQ	DNQ	DNQ																			0
	(United States) Mason Wharton	Kawasaki	DNQ	DNQ	DNQ	DNQ																			0
	(Germany) Philipp Klakow	Husqvarna	DNQ	DNQ	DNQ	DNQ																			0
	(United States) Kyle Murphy	Husqvarna	DNQ	DNQ	DNQ	DNQ																			0
	(United States) Robert Nalezny	Yamaha	DNQ	DNQ	DNQ	DNQ																			0
	(United States) Layton Smail	KTM	DNQ	DNQ													DNQ	DNQ							0
	(United States) Tommy Flora	Honda	DNQ	DNQ													DNQ	DNQ							0
	(United States) Jake Warren	Yamaha			DNQ	DNQ											DNQ	DNQ							0
	(United States) Brad Burkhart	Kawasaki			DNQ	DNQ											DNQ	DNQ							0
	(United States) Drew Thomas	Yamaha			DNQ	DNQ											DNQ	DNQ							0
	(United States) Jack Saggau	Yamaha			DNQ	DNQ											DNQ	DNQ							0
	(United States) Jay Olsen	KTM			DNQ	DNQ											DNQ	DNQ							0
	(United States) Nathan Augustin	KTM					DNQ	DNQ	DNQ	DNQ															0
	(United States) Brett Greenley	Honda					DNQ	DNQ	DNQ	DNQ															0
	(United States) Kyle Koosmann	Yamaha					DNQ	DNQ							DNQ	DNQ									0
	(United States) Wyatt Reimer	Kawasaki					DNQ	DNQ							DNQ	DNQ									0
	(United States) Skylar Olson	Yamaha					DNQ	DNQ									DNQ	DNQ							0
	(United States) Austin Walker	Honda							DNQ	DNQ	DNQ	DNQ													0
	(Canada) Rylan Bly	Honda							DNQ	DNQ	DNQ	DNQ													0
	(United States) Trent Yoder	Honda							DNQ	DNQ	DNQ	DNQ													0
	(United States) Jacob Glenn	KTM							DNQ	DNQ			DNQ	DNQ											0
	(United States) Thomas Lanphear	KTM							DNQ	DNQ									DNQ	DNQ					0
	(United States) Alex Panzarella	Kawasaki							DNQ	DNQ									DNQ	DNQ					0
	(United States) Nick Fratz-Orr	KTM							DNQ	DNQ											DNQ	DNQ			0
	(United States) Kyle Farren	Kawasaki							DNQ	DNQ											DNQ	DNQ			0
	(United States) Landon Armbruster	Honda							DNQ	DNQ													DNQ	DNQ	0
	(United States) Dustin Jensen	KTM									DNQ	DNQ	DNQ	DNQ											0
	(United States) Collin Hinrichs	KTM									DNQ	DNQ			DNQ	DNQ									0
	(United States) Lucas Lockhart	KTM									DNQ	DNQ			DNQ	DNQ									0
	(Canada) Vincent Lauzon	Gas Gas									DNQ	DNQ							DNQ	DNQ					0
	(United States) Cale Kuchnicki	KTM									DNQ	DNQ											DNQ	DNQ	0
	(United States) Tyler Gosnell	KTM									DNQ	DNQ											DNQ	DNQ	0
	(United States) Jason Fichera	Yamaha											DNQ	DNQ	DNQ	DNQ									0
	(United States) Kyle Bushee	Yamaha											DNQ	DNQ					DNQ	DNQ					0
	(United States) Nicholas Niles	Husqvarna											DNQ	DNQ					DNQ	DNQ					0
	(United States) Kevin Uebrick	Husqvarna											DNQ	DNQ					DNQ	DNQ					0
	(United States) James Slaughter Jr	KTM											DNQ	DNQ					DNQ	DNQ					0
	(United States) Cory Broyles	Kawasaki											DNQ	DNQ							DNQ	DNQ			0
	(United States) Tyler Lowe	Yamaha													DNQ	DNQ	DNQ	DNQ							0
	(United States) Joshua Philbrick	Kawasaki													DNQ	DNQ	DNQ	DNQ							0
	(United States) Philip Maus	KTM													DNQ	DNQ			DNQ	DNQ					0
	(United States) Aidan Dickens	Kawasaki													DNQ	DNQ							DNQ	DNQ	0
	(United States) Jason Gepford	Gas Gas													DNQ	DNQ							DNQ	DNQ	0
	(United States) Austin Kapoukranidis	KTM																	DNQ	DNQ	DNQ	DNQ			0
	(United States) CJ Hall	Honda																	DNQ	DNQ	DNQ	DNQ			0
	(United States) Cody Griffin	Yamaha																	DNQ	DNQ			DNQ	DNQ	0
	(United States) Thomas Welch	KTM																			DNQ	DNQ	DNQ	DNQ	0
	(United States) Nicholas Laurie	Yamaha																			DNQ	DNQ	DNQ	DNQ	0
	(United States) Austin Cozadd	Kawasaki																			DNQ	DNQ	DNQ	DNQ	0
	(United States) Griffin Dexter	KTM	DNQ	DNQ																					0
	(United States) Dylan Gaszak	KTM	DNQ	DNQ																					0
	(United States) Addison Emory IV	Yamaha	DNQ	DNQ																					0
	(United States) Talon Gorman	Suzuki	DNQ	DNQ																					0
	(United States) Lucas Lamborn	KTM	DNQ	DNQ																					0
	(United States) Blake Ballard	Yamaha			DNQ	DNQ																			0
	(United States) Brent Burkhart	Kawasaki			DNQ	DNQ																			0
	(United States) Travis Smith	KTM			DNQ	DNQ																			0
	(United States) Bailey Kroone	KTM					DNQ	DNQ																	0
	(United States) James Harrington	Yamaha					DNQ	DNQ																	0
	(United States) Cody Gray	Yamaha					DNQ	DNQ																	0
	(United States) Curren Thurman	Gas Gas					DNQ	DNQ																	0
	(United States) Mitchell Gifford	Kawasaki					DNQ	DNQ																	0
	(United States) Noah Adams	Gas Gas					DNQ	DNQ																	0
	(United States) Rylan Munson	Kawasaki					DNQ	DNQ																	0
	(United States) Jacob Rose	KTM							DNQ	DNQ															0
	(United States) Nicholas Hayes	Kawasaki							DNQ	DNQ															0
	(United States) Nick Kraeger	Honda							DNQ	DNQ															0
	(United States) Garrett Smith	Honda							DNQ	DNQ															0
	(United States) Evan Richard	Gas Gas							DNQ	DNQ															0
	(United States) Justin Thompson	Yamaha							DNQ	DNQ															0
	(Germany) Maik Schaller	Yamaha							DNQ	DNQ															0
	(United States) Joey DeNeen	Husqvarna							DNQ	DNQ															0
	(United States) Kyle Vidovich	Honda							DNQ	DNQ															0
	(United States) Jimmy Knisley	Kawasaki							DNQ	DNQ															0
	(United States) Ryan Tolsma	KTM									DNQ	DNQ													0
	(United States) Kyle Petrie	Gas Gas									DNQ	DNQ													0
	(United States) Matthew Klann	Honda									DNQ	DNQ													0
	(Canada) Derek Hamm	Honda									DNQ	DNQ													0
	(United States) Marshall Macintyre	Kawasaki											DNQ	DNQ											0
	(United States) Tyler Wozney	Yamaha											DNQ	DNQ											0
	(United States) Juan Sanchez	KTM											DNQ	DNQ											0
	(United States) Scott Iverson	KTM											DNQ	DNQ											0
	(United States) Joshua Prior	Suzuki											DNQ	DNQ											0
	(United States) Joshua Berchem	KTM											DNQ	DNQ											0
	(United States) Benjamin Robinson	Suzuki											DNQ	DNQ											0
	(United States) Mario Testa	Kawasaki											DNQ	DNQ											0
	(United States) Richard Tolman-Moschetti	Husqvarna											DNQ	DNQ											0
	(United States) Zachary Johnson	KTM											DNQ	DNQ											0
	(United States) Matthew Fisk	Husqvarna											DNQ	DNQ											0
	(United States) Maurice Healy	Yamaha											DNQ	DNQ											0
	(United States) Jack Pagano	KTM											DNQ	DNQ											0
	(United States) Nicholas O'Neill	Husqvarna											DNQ	DNQ											0
	(United States) Cory Rogers	Husqvarna											DNQ	DNQ											0
	(United States) Ryan Wadsworth	Yamaha											DNQ	DNQ											0
	(United States) Jacob Pogodzienski	KTM											DNQ	DNQ											0
	(United States) Cameron Thurston	Yamaha											DNQ	DNQ											0
	(United States) Gavin Wilkins	Kawasaki													DNQ	DNQ									0
	(United States) Deegan Hepp	Honda													DNQ	DNQ									0
	(United States) Brennan Myers	Gas Gas													DNQ	DNQ									0
	(United States) James Gall	Husqvarna													DNQ	DNQ									0
	(United States) Noah Miesen	Yamaha													DNQ	DNQ									0
	(United States) Brett McLaud	KTM													DNQ	DNQ									0
	(United States) Brendan Grgurich	KTM													DNQ	DNQ									0
	(United States) Zack Archer	Husqvarna													DNQ	DNQ									0
	(United States) Christopher Williams	Suzuki													DNQ	DNQ									0
	(United States) Nick Reekers	KTM													DNQ	DNQ									0
	(United States) Dalton Holle	Kawasaki													DNQ	DNQ									0
	(United States) Morgan Burger	KTM															DNQ	DNQ							0
	(United States) Dylan Summerlin	Gas Gas															DNQ	DNQ							0
	(United States) Braden Spangle	Yamaha															DNQ	DNQ							0
	(United States) Chase Larson	KTM															DNQ	DNQ							0
	(United States) Tyler Hansen	Gas Gas															DNQ	DNQ							0
	(United States) Kolton Dean	Yamaha															DNQ	DNQ							0
	(United States) Adam Conway	Kawasaki															DNQ	DNQ							0
	(United States) Robert Wilson	Yamaha															DNQ	DNQ							0
	(United States) Bryant Humiston	KTM															DNQ	DNQ							0
	(United States) Josh McBride	KTM															DNQ	DNQ							0
	(United States) Josh Lee	Gas Gas															DNQ	DNQ							0
	(United States) Anthony Gonsalves	Kawasaki															DNQ	DNQ							0
	(United States) Bryan O'Neil	KTM															DNQ	DNQ							0
	(United States) Zach Rawlins	KTM															DNQ	DNQ							0
	(United States) Jack Ferrell	KTM															DNQ	DNQ							0
	(United States) Tyler Maddox	Kawasaki															DNQ	DNQ							0
	(United States) Pat McLam	Gas Gas															DNQ	DNQ							0
	(United States) Caleb Hall	KTM																	DNQ	DNQ					0
	(United States) Rashidi Kerrison	Honda																	DNQ	DNQ					0
	(Brazil) Gabriel Andrigo	Yamaha																			DNQ	DNQ			0
	(United States) Travis Randanella	KTM																			DNQ	DNQ			0
	(United States) James Barry	Yamaha																			DNQ	DNQ			0
	(United States) James Henshaw	Yamaha																			DNQ	DNQ			0
	(United States) Eric McKay	Gas Gas																			DNQ	DNQ			0
	(United States) Shane Kehoe	Yamaha																			DNQ	DNQ			0
	(United States) Jayden Shindel	Yamaha																			DNQ	DNQ			0
	(United States) John Snow	Honda																			DNQ	DNQ			0
	(United States) Gerald Lorenz III	Yamaha																					DNQ	DNQ	0
	(United States) Benjamin Nelko	Kawasaki																					DNQ	DNQ	0
	(United States) Jonah Geistler	KTM																					DNQ	DNQ	0
	(United States) Zac Maley	Yamaha																					DNQ	DNQ	0
	(United States) Dawson Chesnut	Kawasaki																					DNQ	DNQ	0
	(United States) Trevor Dunn	KTM																					DNQ	DNQ	0
	(United States) Cody Siler	Yamaha																					DNQ	DNQ	0
Pos	Rider	Bike	FOX (California)		HAN (California)		THU (Colorado)		HIG (Pennsylvania)		RED (Michigan)		SOU (Massachusetts)		SPR (Minnesota)		WAS (Washington (state))		UNA (New York (state))		BUD (Maryland)		IRN (Indiana)		Points

== 250cc ==
=== Entry list ===
Team	Constructor	No	Rider	Rounds
Muc-Off FXR ClubMX Yamaha Racing	Yamaha	6	(United States) Jeremy Martin	1–2
Muc-Off FXR ClubMX Yamaha Racing	Yamaha	36	(United States) Garrett Marchbanks	1–2
Muc-Off FXR ClubMX Yamaha Racing	Yamaha	71	(United States) Preston Kilroy	1–4, 7–11
Muc-Off FXR ClubMX Yamaha Racing	Yamaha	390	(United States) Trevin Nelson	11
Rockstar Energy Husqvarna Factory Racing USA	Husqvarna	24	(United States) RJ Hampshire	1–9
Rockstar Energy Husqvarna Factory Racing USA	Husqvarna	38	(United States) Jalek Swoll	All
Rockstar Energy Husqvarna Factory Racing USA	Husqvarna	339	(United States) Talon Hawkins	All
Rockstar Energy Husqvarna Factory Racing USA	Husqvarna	790	(United States) Casey Cochran	10–11
Monster Energy Pro Circuit Kawasaki	Kawasaki	30	(Japan) Jo Shimoda	All
Monster Energy Pro Circuit Kawasaki	Kawasaki	35	(United States) Seth Hammaker	5–11
Monster Energy Pro Circuit Kawasaki	Kawasaki	52	(United States) Carson Mumford	1–3, 8–10
Monster Energy Pro Circuit Kawasaki	Kawasaki	55	(United States) Austin Forkner	7–11
Monster Energy Pro Circuit Kawasaki	Kawasaki	75	(United States) Ryder DiFrancesco	All
Monster Energy Pro Circuit Kawasaki	Kawasaki	124	(United States) Jett Reynolds	1–3, 5–6
Troy Lee Designs Red Bull GasGas Factory Racing USA	GasGas	31	(United States) Michael Mosiman	1–2
Troy Lee Designs Red Bull GasGas Factory Racing USA	GasGas	33	(United States) Pierce Brown	7–11
Troy Lee Designs Red Bull GasGas Factory Racing USA	GasGas	243	(United States) Caden Braswell	1–8
Troy Lee Designs Red Bull GasGas Factory Racing USA	GasGas	705	(United States) Mark Fineis	10–11
Monster Energy Star Racing Yamaha	Yamaha	32	(United States) Justin Cooper	All
Monster Energy Star Racing Yamaha	Yamaha	40	(United States) Stilez Robertson	9–11
Monster Energy Star Racing Yamaha	Yamaha	43	(United States) Levi Kitchen	All
Monster Energy Star Racing Yamaha	Yamaha	58	(United States) Jordon Smith	1–4
Monster Energy Star Racing Yamaha	Yamaha	88	(Spain) Guillem Farrés	1–3
Monster Energy Star Racing Yamaha	Yamaha	238	(United States) Haiden Deegan	All
Monster Energy Star Racing Yamaha	Yamaha	241	(United States) Daxton Bennick	5–7, 9–11
Red Bull KTM Factory Racing USA	KTM	34	(United States) Max Vohland	All
Red Bull KTM Factory Racing USA	KTM	128	(France) Tom Vialle	All
Red Bull KTM Factory Racing USA	KTM	929	(United States) Julien Beaumer	10–11
AEO Powersports KTM Racing Team	KTM	41	(United States) Derek Kelley	All
AEO Powersports KTM Racing Team	KTM	42	(United States) Joshua Varize	1–3, 7–11
AEO Powersports KTM Racing Team	KTM	273	(United States) Brock Bennett	8–10
Fasthouse Grindstone Compound	Suzuki	59	(United States) Robbie Wageman	1, 7
Sports Clips Beachview Treatment Airline Vacuum	Kawasaki	81	(United States) Ty Masterpool	1
Parts Canada Cobequid Gas Gas	Gas Gas	84	(United States) Mitchell Harrison	5, 10
BarX Suzuki	Suzuki	85	(United States) Dilan Schwartz	All
Team Honda HRC	Honda	96	(Australia) Hunter Lawrence	All
Team Honda HRC	Honda	832	(United States) Chance Hymas	1–4
HBI Racing	Kawasaki	99	(Chile) Hardy Muñoz	1–3, 5–10
HBI Racing	Kawasaki	243	(United States) Caden Braswell	9–11
Steelwrist	Kawasaki	101	(Sweden) Jonathan Von Knorring	6, 9
SC Sporthomes Husqvarna	Husqvarna	108	(Estonia) Jörgen-Matthias Talviku	6–7, 9–11
TPJ Fly Racing Team	Gas Gas	119	(United States) Logan Boye	1–9
TPJ Fly Racing Team	Yamaha	341	(United States) Evan Haimowitz	4–7, 9–11
TPJ Fly Racing Team	Yamaha	733	(United States) Alex Ransom	5, 7–8, 10
TPJ Fly Racing Team	KTM	702	(United States) Hunter Cross	2–11
TPJ Fly Racing Team	KTM	746	(United States) Trevor Schmidt	1
TPJ Fly Racing Team	KTM	971	(United States) Brian Saunier	1, 4–11
Wawro Racing	KTM	122	(United States) Wyatt Wawro	9
Moto Mods Honda	Honda	133	(United States) Dylan Marsh	3, 8
Onlyfans Yamaha	Yamaha	138	(United States) David Pulley Jr.	1–2
Team Calle	Kawasaki	152	(United States) Hunter Calle	6
Dinoliners Daniele Rentals	Yamaha	157	(United States) Tyler Daniele	6, 9
D&D Kawasaki Mexico	Kawasaki	158	(Mexico) Arturo Humberto Fierro	1–3
EMTRacing	Gas Gas	159	(United States) Tyson Johnson	1–8
Concrete Plants Inc	Honda	162	(United States) Maxwell Sanford	4–6, 8–10
Brabec Factory Racing	KTM	163	(United States) Kyler Brabec	2
Team LMR	KTM	177	(United States) Tyler Stepek	1
Richard Racing	Gas Gas	179	(United States) Evan Richard	10–11
Fly Racing Carson Motorsports Flow Vision	Gas Gas	182	(United States) Mason Olson	8
Overtime	KTM	186	(United States) Tyler Monks	3
B18 Motorsports	Husqvarna	188	(United States) Brantley Schnell	All
Wax Room DC	Husqvarna	189	(United States) Cole Robbins	4, 10
Denzin Racing	Yamaha	194	(United States) Derik Denzin	2
World of Echo	Suzuki	203	(United States) Andrew Boccarossa	6
Albano Racing Yamaha	Yamaha	205	(United States) Thomas Albano	6
Fast by Ben Schaeffer The Racer's Edge	Yamaha	211	(United States) Jason Fichera	1–5, 8–10
Walker Racing	Gas Gas	213	(United States) Jacob Walker	6
Racin' Jason MX	KTM	215	(United States) Jason Neidigh	4, 9–11
Gilliam Racing	Gas Gas	217	(United States) Cory Gilliam	4, 10
Warrior MX	Gas Gas	225	(United States) Brett Stralo	1–3
Skaalerud Racing	KTM	229	(United States) Cameron Skaalerud	5, 7, 11
Scrubndirt Maximum CBD	KTM	239	(United States) Bryson Raymond	3–5, 7, 11
MJ Racing	KTM	245	(Denmark) Mathias Jørgensen	4–6, 11
Jetboy Co. BCMX	KTM	249	(United States) Bailey Kroone	5, 7
Lahman Racing JT Motorsports	Husqvarna	252	(United States) Zachary Lahman	4, 10–11
Slo Joe Racing	Honda	257	(United States) Joey DeNeen	5
FXR Total Control HBMotoco	Yamaha	258	(United States) Tyler Evans	3–5
	Honda	264	(United States) Ben Blakely	8
Honda of the Ozarks	Honda	266	(United States) Brett Greenley	5
FrederickTown Yamaha	Yamaha	268	(United States) Gage Stine	4–6, 10–11
West End Racing Tahoe2Strokes No Toil	Yamaha	270	(United States) Bryson Olson	1–2
3Cities	Yamaha	274	(United States) Jared Struebing	8
	Husqvarna	276	(United States) Jaret Finch	1–2, 8
Carsten Racing	Suzuki	281	(United States) Cory Carsten	4–6, 9
	Kawasaki	283	(United States) Aidan Dickens	4–6, 9–10
Bentlever.com Evo Billdog	Honda	289	(United States) Corey Kirkland	8
Mason Agency Crestview Construction	Kawasaki	294	(United States) Nicholas McDonnell	5–6, 8–9
BWR Engines	Honda	299	(United States) Konnor Visger	All
Jordan Jarvis Racing	Yamaha	301	(United States) Jordan Jarvis	1–10
Kennedys Sports Cycles	Yamaha	308	(United States) Jacob Beverage	5, 10
3Bros Hatch Racing Husqvarna	Husqvarna	310	(United States) Kai Aiello	2–3
FDR Motorsports	KTM	312	(United States) Trevor Dunn	1–3, 5–6
Beaverton Motorcycles	Yamaha	318	(United States) Seth Crotty	2, 8
Beaverton Motorcycles	Yamaha	377	(United States) Austin Black	1–2, 8
	Yamaha	321	(United States) Damian Buccieri	4, 6, 9–10
Luevanos Racing	Honda	326	(Mexico) Rafael Chao	1–2, 8
Manluk Rock River Racing	Yamaha	332	(United States) Colton Eigenmann	1–9
Manluk Rock River Racing	Yamaha	352	(United States) Bronson McClure	3, 5, 7, 11
Manluk Rock River Racing	Yamaha	900	(United States) Keegan Rowley	5, 10–11
Monster Army Fly Racing Asterisk	Yamaha	334	(Australia) Brad West	1
Rocky Mountain ATV/MC Rides Unlimited	KTM	337	(South Africa) Slade Smith	All
Rocky Mountain ATV/MC Rides Unlimited	KTM	364	(United States) Chad Saultz	5–8, 11
Rocky Mountain ATV/MC Rides Unlimited	KTM	604	(United States) Max Miller	1
Rocky Mountain ATV/MC Rides Unlimited	KTM	983	(United Kingdom) Ethan Lane	1–9
ATVs and More Route 15 Cycle	KTM	340	(United States) Skyler Leaf	4–5, 7, 11
	Gas Gas	346	(United States) Charles Tolleson	3–5, 7–8
Ajax Motorsports Redline Oil Kawasaki	Kawasaki	350	(United States) Chandler Baker	1
	Kawasaki	351	(United States) Jack Rogers	4–5, 10
	Suzuki	361	(United States) Chase Yentzer	1–10
KRW Cycles	Honda	362	(United States) Braden Gray	4–5
	KTM	363	(United States) Taylor Beckwith	9
DJR Racing Motosport Oneal Hinson Racing	KTM	366	(United States) Blaze Cremaldi	1–6, 9–10
KCK Racing	Honda	369	(United States) Nicholas Hunt	5, 7
	Yamaha	374	(United States) Jared Gumeson	2, 8
Team Fortin	KTM	375	(United States) Lawrence Fortin III	6, 9
KDW Motorsports	Kawasaki	378	(United States) Kyle Wise	9–11
	Gas Gas	383	(United States) James Churn	4–7
Schroyer Racing	Gas Gas	391	(United States) Rody Schroyer	4–5
Maslak Racing	Honda	392	(United States) Pawel Maslak	6, 9–10
Lennon Racing	KTM	394	(United States) Michael Lennon	4, 9–10
OBS Solutions Landis & Landis	Husqvarna	396	(United States) Zach Rawlins	2
PRORACING Suspension	KTM	405	(United States) Tyler Aldor	3, 8
Dubach Racing Development	Yamaha	409	(United States) Carter Dubach	1–3, 8
	KTM	414	(United States) Mason Morris	5
SLK Motosports	Honda	422	(United States) Steven Keil	4–6, 11
4-PR Performance FXR Race Tech	Kawasaki	424	(United States) Nolan Dickinson	1–8, 11
	Gas Gas	426	(United States) Josh Toth	6
Triangle Cycles	Yamaha	428	(United States) Chad Stonier	5–6
MD Distribution Husqvarna	Husqvarna	430	(Canada) William Crete	5, 9
	Kawasaki	433	(United States) Anthony Gonsalves	1–2
	KTM	435	(South Africa) Marcus Phelps	All
Team Justice MX Racing	KTM	459	(United States) Austin Brooks	5–6, 9–10
Excel Concrete Steel Ridge Detailing	KTM	462	(United States) Skyler Adams	2, 8
	Kawasaki	463	(United States) Zachery Nobrega	9, 11
Short Track Nation	KTM	465	(United States) Conor Sheridan	6
Woolf Aircraft Detroit Bandsaw LWT	Kawasaki	470	(United States) Ethan Day	All
	KTM	473	(United States) Lux Turner	5–6
Maple Ridge Motor Sports	Kawasaki	485	(Canada) Devyn Smith	11
Randanella Septic Inc.	Kawasaki	489	(United States) Ricci Randanella	10
Cochran Racing	Gas Gas	490	(United States) Ragan Cochran	7
Matamoros Racing	KTM	504	(Honduras) Gerhard Matamoros	4–6, 9–11
Orange Brigade	KTM	506	(United States) Preston Boespflug	8
RPE Waste Service Majcher Builders	KTM	507	(United States) Thomas Lanphear	6
Roth Racing	Honda	514	(United States) Anthony Roth	3, 6
Hammerchurch.com	Yamaha	527	(United States) Matthew Hammer	9
Redline Oil Maximum CBD OGS	KTM	535	(United States) Robert Bailey	4, 7, 11
Basic Moto Co. Feine Tune	KTM	536	(United States) Gavin Tilford	11
Waxed Racing	Husqvarna	537	(United States) Travis Mecking	4, 6, 8–11
Tucker Freight Lines	KTM	540	(United States) Leo Tucker	6, 9–11
Murdoch Racing	Husqvarna	560	(United States) Kyle Murdoch	4–6
Underground RC	Honda	561	(United States) Caleb Hall	6
JAG Racing	Gas Gas	570	(United States) Jason Gepford	5
Rocket Valley Motorsports	Yamaha	574	(United States) Ryan Lechien	4–5, 9
Scotty T Golf Carts	Gas Gas	581	(United States) Cory Rogers	10
Red Bull KTM South Africa	KTM	584	(South Africa) Cameron Durow	9–11
Ludwigsen Racing	Yamaha	585	(United States) Bradley Ludwigsen	8
TFR	Honda	589	(United States) Kurt Thomas	8
Vision Moto Co	Gas Gas	598	(United States) Tyler Conner	4, 10
	KTM	601	(United States) Cael Bagby	11
	Gas Gas	602	(United States) Gage Linville	9, 11
Hydraulic Solutions Fire Protection	KTM	605	(United States) Blake Broderick	10–11
Trail Jesters KTM	KTM	613	(United States) James DeCotis	6, 9
	KTM	619	(United States) Dane Folsom	11
Motosport Watts Perfections Dirtlab Concepts	Husqvarna	620	(United States) Peyton Jackson	4–5, 9–11
The Racers Edge Tri-County Powersports	KTM	626	(United States) Colton Aeck	8
Chilson's Logistics	KTM	630	(United States) Matthew Jackson	10–11
Williams MotoWerx	Yamaha	646	(United States) Elijah Tetzlaff	7, 9–11
GFR	Husqvarna	662	(United States) James Gall	5, 11
Louds Racing	KTM	655	(United States) Tyler Loud	6, 9–10
Stempel Racing	Husqvarna	664	(United States) Hunter Stempel	6
Grassroots MX	Honda	670	(United States) Gavin Brough	1–5, 7–8, 11
First Bike Motorsports	Yamaha	680	(United States) Thomas Squib	9–11
Maximum Motor Sports CR	Honda	681	(Costa Rica) Justin Alvarado	10
Rob's Performance Motorsports	Husqvarna	683	(United States) Justin Oehlhof	5, 7, 11
Usko Racing	Kawasaki	689	(United States) Tony Usko	11
4-PR Performance Race Tech FXR	KTM	694	(United States) Nicholas Inman	1–9, 11
MPH Honda Deep Hollow Ranch	Yamaha	696	(United States) Nick Kraeger	9
Mitchell Zaremba Racing	Yamaha	703	(United States) Mitchell Zaremba	4–5, 11
Hempen Industrial Rock River Yamaha	Yamaha	707	(United States) Josiah Hempen	7
	Yamaha	711	(Canada) Michael Da Silva	9
St. Laurent Racing	KTM	712	(United States) Samuel St. Laurent	6, 9
Power Curve MX BSE Well & Water	Yamaha	715	(United States) Ian Kearon	4–6, 9–11
FDR Motosports	Honda	720	(United States) Jordon Fancher	6, 10–11
	KTM	725	(United States) Joshua Moore	10
	KTM	727	(United Kingdom) James Cottrell	7
Nextgen Roofing Montys Motorsports	Yamaha	731	(United States) Robert Bombard	6
Hillview Motorsports	Yamaha	738	(United States) Steve Roman	4
RPM's Apparel E Centro Welding	Honda	741	(United States) Spencer Mang	9
Team Manni Racing	KTM	749	(United States) James Manni	6
Bronco Boys	Yamaha	759	(United States) Mason Holt	3, 8
R2 MX Graphics Motorsports Nation	KTM	769	(United States) Andrew Rossi	5–6, 8, 10
Motorbikes Plus Factory Connection Fly Racing	KTM	771	(United States) Jack Zarse	6, 9
LDD Sports Ian Burke Speedworks	KTM	773	(United States) Hunter Nitsch	6, 9–10
Tech Service Racing	Yamaha	777	(United States) James Harrington	1–2, 4–10
MT791 Racing	Honda	791	(United States) Matthew Thomas	2, 5
FXR Factory Racing Triple JJJ Services	KTM	793	(United States) Jesse Jacobsen	7–8, 10–11
Stan Benson Racing	Kawasaki	805	(United States) Vincent Varola	10–11
Phase Moto	Yamaha	809	(United States) Brayden Ehlermann	6, 10
Williams Racing	Suzuki	811	(United States) Christopher Williams	4–6
	Gas Gas	815	(United States) Jordan Smith	5, 7, 10
	Husqvarna	817	(United States) Max Darling	4–6
Action Powersports KTM	KTM	819	(United States) Blake Hoag	1
Duke Cycles Ronnie Prado	Gas Gas	822	(United States) Riley Ripper	4
FedEx	Gas Gas	830	(United States) Ezra Lewis	6
Collision One Limited Decal	KTM	831	(United States) Jacob Glenn	5, 9–10
Let's Ride Pure Adrenaline Throttle Therapy	KTM	835	(United States) Conner Lords	8
	KTM	836	(United States) Lucas Geistler	11
	KTM	844	(Netherlands) Robert Fobbe	1
RPM Cross	Yamaha	846	(Argentina) Fermín Ciccimarra	11
Bloxom Construction	Yamaha	866	(United States) Ashton Bloxom	1–6, 8–11
MCR JNKYARD Designs	Yamaha	881	(United States) Gerald Lorenz III	4–5
Bullit Racing	KTM	889	(United States) Cody Williams	6, 9
MVMT Company	KTM	912	(United States) Bryn Steffan	5
R2 Racing	Husqvarna	915	(United States) Ryan Quinn	4, 9
Hulsey Racing	Yamaha	924	(United States) Gage Hulsey	2–11
DeWitt Custom Concrete	Yamaha	927	(United States) Shane Kehoe	6, 11
MXA Ekolu Suspension Co	Suzuki	934	(United States) Brian Medeiros	1–2
Everkept MBMS Axiom Racing	KTM	941	(United States) Kelson Ammons	2, 8
Fasthouse Jones Excavating Fusion Graphics	Yamaha	946	(United States) Cole Jones	4–6, 9–11
Smokin Joe's Racing Racepro USA	Yamaha	962	(United States) Joseph Tait	4, 6, 8–10
M.P. Langan General Contracting	Honda	967	(United States) Ryan Langan	9
Crew Racing	Yamaha	970	(United States) Kyle DeRoche	3, 7
Maxima Racing Oils	Gas Gas	990	(Chile) Nicolás Israel	9–11
	Gas Gas	992	(United Kingdom) Joel Rizzi	3

=== Riders Championship ===
Pos	Rider	Bike	FOX (California)		HAN (California)		THU (Colorado)		HIG (Pennsylvania)		RED (Michigan)		SOU (Massachusetts)		SPR (Minnesota)		WAS (Washington (state))		UNA (New York (state))		BUD (Maryland)		IRN (Indiana)		Points
1	(Australia) Hunter Lawrence	Honda	3	1	3	1	2	1	3	1	1	Ret	26	8	1	2	2	4	2	2	2	1	5	9	419
2	(United States) Justin Cooper	Yamaha	5	4	2	2	1	4	DNS	DNS	8	4	2	2	4	1	3	2	5	1	1	2	13	2	399
3	(Japan) Jo Shimoda	Kawasaki	4	6	4	10	3	8	7	3	8	5	6	1	2	3	6	7	3	3	7	3	1	1	393
4	(United States) Haiden Deegan	Yamaha	6	2	1	4	4	9	2	6	2	3	4	10	5	8	1	1	Ret	10	16	5	2	3	371
5	(United States) Levi Kitchen	Yamaha	10	7	10	7	5	2	12	4	7	1	5	9	7	4	8	3	1	4	14	10	7	Ret	322
6	(France) Tom Vialle	KTM	7	3	7	3	29	DNS	11	2	9	2	1	3	6	5	Ret	DNS	8	7	5	6	3	4	302
7	(United States) Maximus Vohland	KTM	2	9	11	12	7	5	6	12	6	6	8	6	10	7	5	8	4	6	9	16	8	8	295
8	(United States) RJ Hampshire	Husqvarna	1	11	5	5	8	7	1	7	3	7	3	4	3	6	4	5	7	DNS					288
9	(United States) Jalek Swoll	Husqvarna	Ret	20	9	11	10	10	4	11	Ret	8	11	7	8	14	10	18	6	14	3	12	11	5	221
10	(United States) Ryder DiFrancesco	Kawasaki	9	13	8	13	9	11	5	8	14	14	13	13	12	15	Ret	12	9	12	21	7	9	6	208
11	(United States) Seth Hammaker	Kawasaki									5	10	7	5	19	11	7	6	24	8	6	14	6	12	157
12	(United States) Talon Hawkins	Husqvarna	20	17	21	15	14	14	13	14	15	15	10	14	15	12	11	14	17	15	17	21	10	19	129
13	(United States) Dilan Schwartz	Suzuki	22	25	19	14	17	13	14	9	13	13	15	18	16	13	13	Ret	10	Ret	13	18	14	13	123
14	(United States) Daxton Bennick	Yamaha									10	9	17	12	14	10			14	9	4	11	20	7	116
15	(United States) Caden Braswell	Gas Gas	18	18	27	16	12	12	8	13	Ret	12	9	11	13	23	15	13							109
15	(United States) Caden Braswell	Kawasaki																	21	17	26	22	36	18	109
16	(United States) Carson Mumford	Kawasaki	11	8	15	9	DNS	DNS									9	9	15	13	12	8			101
17	(United States) Austin Forkner	Kawasaki													11	9	21	10	22	5	8	4	4	Ret	98
18	(United States) Chance Hymas	Honda	15	12	18	6	11	3	8	5															92
19	(United States) Pierce Brown	Gas Gas													9	16	12	11	12	11	15	24	17	10	76
20	(United States) Jordon Smith	Yamaha	13	14	12	17	6	6	15	10															75
21	(United States) Preston Kilroy	Yamaha	23	24	22	Ret	13	23	10	15					17	18	14	15	13	16	22	19	16	15	71
22	(Spain) Guillem Farrés	Yamaha	8	5	6	8	Ret	DNS																	57
23	(United States) Stilez Robertson	Yamaha																	11	18	10	13	12	11	51
24	(United States) Derek Kelley	KTM	29	22	24	19	15	15	16	16	17	25	20	DNS	21	17	26	32	18	19	23	20	23	14	46
25	(United States) Joshua Varize	KTM	21	21	20	18	Ret	DNS							Ret	19	16	16	19	23	18	15	18	17	34
26	(United States) Jett Reynolds	Kawasaki	12	16	17	Ret	Ret	DNS			11	20	DNS	DNS											29
27	(United States) Julien Beaumer	KTM																			11	9	15	Ret	28
28	(South Africa) Slade Smith	KTM	33	30	26	21	19	16	19	18	20	17	18	15	24	20	24	20	29	25	Ret	30	27	22	28
29	(Estonia) Jörgen-Matthias Talviku	Husqvarna											14	16	18	Ret			23	21	24	17	19	16	26
30	(United States) Michael Mosiman	Gas Gas	19	10	14	Ret																			20
31	(United States) Mitchell Harrison	Gas Gas									12	11									DNS	DNS			19
32	(United States) Jeremy Martin	Yamaha	16	19	13	Ret																			15
33	(United States) Garrett Marchbanks	Yamaha	17	15	16	30																			15
34	(United States) Chase Yentzer	Suzuki	31	34	30	Ret	18	17	17	17	DNS	DNS	DNQ	DNQ	26	28	36	31	Ret	DNS	DNQ	DNQ			15
35	(United States) James DeCotis	KTM											12	17					32	28					13
36	(United States) Tyson Johnson	Gas Gas	26	28	29	23	Ret	DNS	25	21	16	16	27	20	23	21	19	24							13
37	(United States) Brock Bennett	KTM															18	17	16	Ret	25	Ret			12
38	(Chile) Hardy Muñoz	Kawasaki	25	26	23	20	16	Ret			21	Ret	Ret	23	20	22	20	19	20	Ret	Ret	DNS			11
39	(United States) Ty Masterpool	Kawasaki	14	23																					7
40	(Denmark) Mathias Jørgensen	KTM							Ret	DNS	19	18	Ret	19									30	26	7
41	(United States) Lux Turner	KTM									18	19	19	Ret											7
42	(United States) James Harrington	Yamaha	36	35	32	28			28	28	27	Ret	16	22	28	25	25	23	25	20	DNQ	DNQ			6
43	(United States) Maxwell Sanford	Honda							18	19	25	21	Ret	28			29	26	28	DNS	28	Ret			5
44	(United States) Preston Boespflug	KTM															17	21							4
45	(United Kingdom) Joel Rizzi	Gas Gas					21	18																	3
46	(South Africa) Marcus Phelps	KTM	32	31	28	22	30	19	DNQ	DNQ	24	24	24	26	22	24	28	Ret	27	26	31	26	25	Ret	2
47	(United States) Casey Cochran	Husqvarna																			19	23	28	Ret	2
48	(United States) Mark Fineis	Gas Gas																			20	Ret	21	20	2
49	(United States) Kai Aiello	Husqvarna			31	26	20	20																	2
50	(United States) Mitchell Zaremba	Yamaha							24	20	23	22											Ret	30	1
51	(United States) Jack Rogers	Kawasaki							20	22	DNQ	DNQ									Ret	29			1
	(United States) Kyle Murdoch	Husqvarna							22	23	DNQ	DNQ	21	27											0
	(United States) Josh Toth	Gas Gas											22	21											0
	(United States) Trevin Nelson	Yamaha																					22	21	0
	(United States) Gavin Brough	Honda	34	36	33	27	23	21	DNQ	DNQ	DNQ	DNQ			Ret	27	27	27					31	29	0
	(United States) Cory Carsten	Suzuki							21	29	DNQ	DNQ	DNQ	DNQ					DNQ	DNQ					0
	(United States) Hunter Cross	KTM			DNQ	DNQ	22	33	DNQ	DNQ	29	33	25	36	29	26	22	22	31	22	35	33	32	25	0
	(United Kingdom) Ethan Lane	KTM	DNQ	DNQ	34	25	24	22	DNQ	DNQ	26	23	DNQ	DNQ	31	29	31	29	DNQ	DNQ					0
	(United States) Bryson Raymond	KTM					27	38	DNQ	DNQ	22	Ret			35	DNS							DNQ	DNQ	0
	(United States) Blaze Cremaldi	KTM	DNQ	39	37	33	26	24	23	27	28	28	DNQ	DNQ					DNQ	DNQ	DNQ	DNQ			0
	(United States) Cody Williams	KTM											23	25					34	30					0
	(United States) Colton Aeck	KTM															23	25							0
	(South Africa) Cameron Durow	KTM																	30	27	DNQ	28	29	23	0
	(United States) Gage Linville	Gas Gas																	26	24			24	27	0
	(United States) Austin Black	Yamaha	35	33	25	24											DNQ	DNQ							0
	(United States) Gage Stine	Yamaha							DNQ	DNQ	32	26	Ret	31							29	27	26	24	0
	(United States) Joseph Tait	Yamaha							26	Ret			Ret	24			33	30	33	29	32	32			0
	(Australia) Brad West	Yamaha	24	27																					0
	(United States) Peyton Jackson	Husqvarna							29	24	DNQ	DNQ							DNQ	DNQ	DNQ	DNQ	38	34	0
	(Mexico) Arturo Humberto Fierro	Kawasaki	DNQ	38	35	31	25	27																	0
	(United States) Vincent Varola	Kawasaki																			27	25	Ret	Ret	0
	(Honduras) Gerhard Matamoros	KTM							33	25	DNQ	DNQ	DNQ	DNQ					35	32	DNQ	DNQ	37	28	0
	(United States) Carter Dubach	Yamaha	37	DNS	36	29	DNQ	25									DNQ	DNQ							0
	(United States) Robbie Wageman	Suzuki	Ret	DNS											25	Ret									0
	(United States) Colton Eigenmann	Yamaha	DNQ	DNQ	DNQ	DNQ	35	26	DNQ	DNQ	Ret	34	DNQ	DNQ	33	30	30	28	Ret	DNS					0
	(United States) Steve Roman	Yamaha							Ret	26															0
	(United States) Rody Schroyer	Gas Gas							27	30	30	29													0
	(United States) Bronson McClure	Yamaha					31	34			DNQ	DNQ			27	31							34	33	0
	(United States) Evan Haimowitz	Yamaha							32	Ret	31	27	DNQ	DNQ	DNQ	33			DNQ	Ret	DNQ	DNQ	DNQ	DNQ	0
	(United States) Chandler Baker	Kawasaki	27	32																					0
	(United States) Brantley Schnell	Husqvarna	38	Ret	38	Ret	28	28	DNQ	DNQ	DNQ	Ret	DNQ	DNQ	DNQ	DNQ	DNQ	DNQ	DNQ	DNQ	DNQ	34	DNQ	DNQ	0
	(United States) Max Miller	KTM	28	29																					0
	(United States) Jack Zarse	KTM											28	30					DNQ	DNQ					0
	(United States) Lawrence Fortin III	KTM											30	29					DNQ	DNQ					0
	(United States) Konnor Visger	Honda	DNQ	DNQ	DNQ	DNQ	32	29	DNQ	DNQ	DNQ	DNQ	DNQ	DNQ	DNQ	DNQ	35	33	DNQ	DNQ	DNQ	DNQ	DNQ	DNQ	0
	(United States) Nicholas McDonnell	Kawasaki									DNQ	DNQ	29	Ret			DNQ	DNQ	DNQ	DNQ					0
	(United States) Ricci Randanella	Kawasaki																			30	31			0
	(United States) Charles Tolleson	Gas Gas					36	30	DNQ	38	34	32			32	32	DNQ	DNQ							0
	(United States) Tyler Evans	Yamaha					DNQ	37	30	34	DNQ	DNQ													0
	(United States) Tyler Stepek	KTM	30	37																					0
	(United States) Bailey Kroone	KTM									Ret	30			Ret	Ret									0
	(United States) Cameron Skaalerud	KTM									Ret	DNS			30	Ret							DNQ	DNQ	0
	(United States) Travis Mecking	Husqvarna							DNQ	DNQ			31	32			DNQ	DNQ	DNQ	DNQ	34	37	DNQ	DNQ	0
	(United States) Leo Tucker	KTM											DNQ	34					36	33	DNQ	DNQ	33	31	0
	(United States) Ashton Bloxom	Yamaha	DNQ	DNQ	DNQ	DNQ	33	31	DNQ	DNQ	DNQ	DNQ	DNQ	DNQ			DNQ	DNQ	DNQ	DNQ	DNQ	DNQ	DNQ	DNQ	0
	(United States) Brett Greenley	Honda									33	31													0
	(United States) Gerald Lorenz III	Yamaha							31	37	DNQ	DNQ													0
	(Chile) Nicolás Israel	Gas Gas																	37	31	DNQ	DNQ	DNQ	DNQ	0
	(United States) Ian Kearon	Yamaha							Ret	31	DNQ	DNQ	DNQ	DNQ					DNQ	DNQ	DNQ	DNQ	DNQ	DNQ	0
	(United States) Jason Fichera	Yamaha	DNQ	DNQ	39	32	DNQ	DNQ	DNQ	DNQ	DNQ	DNQ					32	35	DNQ	DNQ	DNQ	DNQ			0
	(United States) Jesse Jacobsen	KTM													Ret	35	34	34			DNQ	DNQ	35	32	0
	(United States) Nicholas Inman	KTM	DNQ	DNQ	DNQ	DNQ	34	32	DNQ	DNQ	DNQ	35	DNQ	DNQ	DNQ	DNQ	DNQ	DNQ	DNQ	DNQ			DNQ	DNQ	0
	(United States) Aidan Dickens	Kawasaki							34	32	DNQ	DNQ	DNQ	DNQ					DNQ	DNQ	DNQ	DNQ			0
	(United States) Hunter Stempel	Husqvarna											32	35											0
	(United States) Cole Jones	Yamaha							35	33	DNQ	DNQ	DNQ	DNQ					DNQ	DNQ	DNQ	DNQ	DNQ	DNQ	0
	(United States) Keegan Rowley	Yamaha									DNQ	DNQ									33	35	DNQ	DNQ	0
	(United States) Pawel Maslak	Honda											DNQ	33					DNQ	DNQ	DNQ	DNQ			0
	(United States) Ethan Day	Kawasaki	DNQ	DNQ	DNQ	DNQ	DNQ	35	DNQ	DNQ	DNQ	DNQ	DNQ	DNQ	34	34	DNQ	DNQ	DNQ	DNQ	36	36	DNQ	DNQ	0
	(United States) Jaret Finch	Husqvarna	DNQ	DNQ	40	34											DNQ	DNQ							0
	(United States) Jason Neidigh	KTM							DNQ	35									DNQ	DNQ	DNQ	DNQ	DNQ	DNQ	0
	(United States) Skyler Leaf	KTM							36	36	DNQ	DNQ			DNQ	DNQ							DNQ	DNQ	0
	(United Kingdom) James Cottrell	KTM													Ret	36									0
	(United States) Jordan Jarvis	Yamaha	DNQ	DNQ	DNQ	DNQ	DNQ	36	DNQ	DNQ	DNQ	DNQ	DNQ	DNQ	DNQ	DNQ	DNQ	DNQ	DNQ	DNQ	DNQ	DNQ			0
	(United States) Conner Lords	KTM															DNQ	36							0
	(United States) Jared Gumeson	Yamaha			DNQ	DNQ											38	37							0
	(United States) Alex Ransom	Yamaha									DNQ	DNQ			DNQ	DNQ	37	Ret			DNQ	DNQ			0
	(United States) Andrew Rossi	KTM									DNQ	DNQ	Ret	37			DNQ	DNQ			DNQ	DNQ			0
	(United States) Hunter Calle	Kawasaki											Ret	Ret											0
	(United States) Tyler Conner	Gas Gas							Ret	DNS											DNQ	DNQ			0
	(Canada) William Crete	Husqvarna									Ret	DNS							DNS	DNS					0
	(United States) Conor Sheridan	KTM											Ret	DNS											0
	(United States) Gage Hulsey	Yamaha			DNQ	DNQ	DNQ	DNQ	DNQ	DNQ	DNQ	DNQ	DNQ	DNQ	DNQ	DNQ	DNQ	DNQ	DNQ	DNQ	DNQ	DNQ	DNQ	DNQ	0
	(United States) Logan Boye	Gas Gas	DNQ	DNQ	DNQ	DNQ	DNQ	DNQ	DNQ	DNQ	DNQ	DNQ	DNQ	DNQ	DNQ	DNQ	DNQ	DNQ	DNQ	DNQ					0
	(United States) Brian Saunier	KTM	DNQ	DNQ					DNQ	DNQ	DNQ	DNQ	DNQ	DNQ	DNQ	DNQ	DNQ	DNQ	DNQ	DNQ	DNQ	DNQ	DNQ	DNQ	0
	(United States) Nolan Dickinson	Kawasaki	DNQ	DNQ	DNQ	DNQ	DNQ	DNQ	DNQ	DNQ	DNQ	DNQ	DNQ	DNQ	DNQ	DNQ	DNQ	DNQ					DNQ	DNQ	0
	(United States) Trevor Dunn	KTM	DNQ	DNQ	DNQ	DNQ	DNQ	DNQ			DNQ	DNQ	DNQ	DNQ											0
	(United States) Chad Saultz	KTM									DNQ	DNQ	DNQ	DNQ	DNQ	DNQ	DNQ	DNQ					DNQ	DNQ	0
	(United States) James Churn	Gas Gas							DNQ	DNQ	DNQ	DNQ	DNQ	DNQ	DNQ	DNQ									0
	(United States) Steven Keil	Honda							DNQ	DNQ	DNQ	DNQ	DNQ	DNQ									DNQ	DNQ	0
	(United States) Damian Buccieri	Yamaha							DNQ	DNQ			DNQ	DNQ					DNQ	DNQ	DNQ	DNQ			0
	(United States) Austin Brooks	KTM									DNQ	DNQ	DNQ	DNQ					DNQ	DNQ	DNQ	DNQ			0
	(United States) Elijah Tetzlaff	Yamaha													DNQ	DNQ			DNQ	DNQ	DNQ	DNQ	DNQ	DNQ	0
	(United States) Brett Stralo	Gas Gas	DNQ	DNQ	DNQ	DNQ	DNQ	DNQ																	0
	(Mexico) Rafael Chao	Honda	DNQ	DNQ	DNQ	DNQ											DNQ	DNQ							0
	(United States) Max Darling	Husqvarna							DNQ	DNQ	DNQ	DNQ	DNQ	DNQ											0
	(United States) Christopher Williams	Suzuki							DNQ	DNQ	DNQ	DNQ	DNQ	DNQ											0
	(United States) Ryan Lechien	Yamaha							DNQ	DNQ	DNQ	DNQ							DNQ	DNQ					0
	(United States) Robert Bailey	KTM							DNQ	DNQ					DNQ	DNQ							DNQ	DNQ	0
	(United States) Michael Lennon	KTM							DNQ	DNQ									DNQ	DNQ	DNQ	DNQ			0
	(United States) Zachary Lahman	Husqvarna							DNQ	DNQ											DNQ	DNQ	DNQ	DNQ	0
	(United States) Justin Oehlhof	Husqvarna									DNQ	DNQ			DNQ	DNQ							DNQ	DNQ	0
	(United States) Jordan Smith	Gas Gas									DNQ	DNQ							DNQ	DNQ	DNQ	DNQ			0
	(United States) Jacob Glenn	KTM									DNQ	DNQ							DNQ	DNQ	DNQ	DNQ			0
	(United States) Hunter Nitsch	KTM											DNQ	DNQ					DNQ	DNQ	DNQ	DNQ			0
	(United States) Tyler Loud	KTM											DNQ	DNQ					DNQ	DNQ	DNQ	DNQ			0
	(United States) Jordon Fancher	Honda											DNQ	DNQ							DNQ	DNQ	DNQ	DNQ	0
	(United States) Kyle Wise	Kawasaki																	DNQ	DNQ	DNQ	DNQ	DNQ	DNQ	0
	(United States) Thomas Squib	Yamaha																	DNQ	DNQ	DNQ	DNQ	DNQ	DNQ	0
	(United States) Brian Medeiros	Suzuki	DNQ	DNQ	DNQ	DNQ																			0
	(United States) Anthony Gonsalves	Kawasaki	DNQ	DNQ	DNQ	DNQ																			0
	(United States) Bryson Olson	Yamaha	DNQ	DNQ	DNQ	DNQ																			0
	(United States) David Pulley Jr.	Yamaha	DNQ	DNQ	DNQ	DNQ																			0
	(United States) Matthew Thomas	Honda			DNQ	DNQ					DNQ	DNQ													0
	(United States) Seth Crotty	Yamaha			DNQ	DNQ											DNQ	DNQ							0
	(United States) Kelson Ammons	KTM			DNQ	DNQ											DNQ	DNQ							0
	(United States) Skyler Adams	KTM			DNQ	DNQ											DNQ	DNQ							0
	(United States) Anthony Roth	Honda					DNQ	DNQ					DNQ	DNQ											0
	(United States) Kyle DeRoche	Yamaha					DNQ	DNQ							DNQ	DNQ									0
	(United States) Mason Holt	Yamaha					DNQ	DNQ									DNQ	DNQ							0
	(United States) Dylan Marsh	Honda					DNQ	DNQ									DNQ	DNQ							0
	(United States) Tyler Aldor	KTM					DNQ	DNQ									DNQ	DNQ							0
	(United States) Braden Gray	Honda							DNQ	DNQ	DNQ	DNQ													0
	(United States) Ryan Quinn	Husqvarna							DNQ	DNQ									DNQ	DNQ					0
	(United States) Cory Gilliam	Gas Gas							DNQ	DNQ											DNQ	DNQ			0
	(United States) Cole Robbins	Husqvarna							DNQ	DNQ											DNQ	DNQ			0
	(United States) Chad Stonier	Yamaha									DNQ	DNQ	DNQ	DNQ											0
	(United States) Nicholas Hunt	Honda									DNQ	DNQ			DNQ	DNQ									0
	(United States) Jacob Beverage	Yamaha									DNQ	DNQ									DNQ	DNQ			0
	(United States) James Gall	Husqvarna									DNQ	DNQ											DNQ	DNQ	0
	(United States) Samuel St. Laurent	KTM											DNQ	DNQ					DNQ	DNQ					0
	(Sweden) Jonathan Von Knorring	Kawasaki											DNQ	DNQ					DNQ	DNQ					0
	(United States) Tyler Daniele	Yamaha											DNQ	DNQ					DNQ	DNQ					0
	(United States) Brayden Ehlermann	Yamaha											DNQ	DNQ							DNQ	DNQ			0
	(United States) Shane Kehoe	Yamaha											DNQ	DNQ									DNQ	DNQ	0
	(United States) Zachery Nobrega	Kawasaki																	DNQ	DNQ			DNQ	DNQ	0
	(United States) Evan Richard	Gas Gas																			DNQ	DNQ	DNQ	DNQ	0
	(United States) Blake Broderick	KTM																			DNQ	DNQ	DNQ	DNQ	0
	(United States) Matthew Jackson	KTM																			DNQ	DNQ	DNQ	DNQ	0
	(Netherlands) Robert Fobbe	KTM	DNQ	DNQ																					0
	(United States) Trevor Schmidt	KTM	DNQ	DNQ																					0
	(United States) Blake Hoag	KTM	DNQ	DNQ																					0
	(United States) Kyler Brabec	KTM			DNQ	DNQ																			0
	(United States) Zach Rawlins	Husqvarna			DNQ	DNQ																			0
	(United States) Derik Denzin	Yamaha			DNQ	DNQ																			0
	(United States) Tyler Monks	KTM					DNQ	DNQ																	0
	(United States) Riley Ripper	Gas Gas							DNQ	DNQ															0
	(United States) Bryn Steffan	KTM									DNQ	DNQ													0
	(United States) Jason Gepford	Gas Gas									DNQ	DNQ													0
	(United States) Joey DeNeen	Honda									DNQ	DNQ													0
	(United States) Mason Morris	KTM									DNQ	DNQ													0
	(United States) Thomas Lanphear	KTM											DNQ	DNQ											0
	(United States) Ezra Lewis	Gas Gas											DNQ	DNQ											0
	(United States) Robert Bombard	Yamaha											DNQ	DNQ											0
	(United States) James Manni	KTM											DNQ	DNQ											0
	(United States) Jacob Walker	Gas Gas											DNQ	DNQ											0
	(United States) Andrew Boccarossa	Suzuki											DNQ	DNQ											0
	(United States) Caleb Hall	Honda											DNQ	DNQ											0
	(United States) Thomas Albano	Yamaha											DNQ	DNQ											0
	(United States) Josiah Hempen	Yamaha													DNQ	DNQ									0
	(United States) Ragan Cochran	Gas Gas													DNQ	DNQ									0
	(United States) Mason Olson	Gas Gas															DNQ	DNQ							0
	(United States) Bradley Ludwigsen	Yamaha															DNQ	DNQ							0
	(United States) Ben Blakely	Honda															DNQ	DNQ							0
	(United States) Kurt Thomas	Honda															DNQ	DNQ							0
	(United States) Corey Kirkland	Honda															DNQ	DNQ							0
	(United States) Jared Struebing	Yamaha															DNQ	DNQ							0
	(United States) Taylor Beckwith	KTM																	DNQ	DNQ					0
	(United States) Matthew Hammer	Yamaha																	DNQ	DNQ					0
	(Canada) Michael Da Silva	Yamaha																	DNQ	DNQ					0
	(United States) Nick Kraeger	Yamaha																	DNQ	DNQ					0
	(United States) Spencer Mang	Honda																	DNQ	DNQ					0
	(United States) Ryan Langan	Honda																	DNQ	DNQ					0
	(United States) Wyatt Wawro	KTM																	DNQ	DNQ					0
	(Costa Rica) Justin Alvarado	Honda																			DNQ	DNQ			0
	(United States) Cory Rogers	Gas Gas																			DNQ	DNQ			0
	(United States) Joshua Moore	KTM																			DNQ	DNQ			0
	(Argentina) Fermín Ciccimarra	Yamaha																					DNQ	DNQ	0
	(United States) Lucas Geistler	KTM																					DNQ	DNQ	0
	(United States) Dane Folsom	KTM																					DNQ	DNQ	0
	(United States) Tony Usko	Kawasaki																					DNQ	DNQ	0
	(Canada) Devyn Smith	Kawasaki																					DNQ	DNQ	0
	(United States) Cael Bagby	KTM																					DNQ	DNQ	0
	(United States) Gavin Tilford	KTM																					DNQ	DNQ	0
Pos	Rider	Bike	FOX (California)		HAN (California)		THU (Colorado)		HIG (Pennsylvania)		RED (Michigan)		SOU (Massachusetts)		SPR (Minnesota)		WAS (Washington (state))		UNA (New York (state))		BUD (Maryland)		IRN (Indiana)		Points
