= Harold Fowler =

Harold Fowler may refer to:

- Harold Fowler (sailor) (1899–1975), Olympic sailor
- Hal Fowler (1927–2000), American poker player
- Harold G. Fowler, landscape architect
- Harold Fowler (RAF officer) (1886–1957), British soldier
- Harold North Fowler, American classicist

== See also ==
- Harold Fowler McCormick (1872–1941), American businessman
- Harry Fowler (disambiguation)
