= De La Brooke Tobacco Barn =

- U.S. National Register of Historic Places
- Location within Maryland Location within the United States
- Location: De La Brooke Road, near Oraville, Maryland
- Coordinates: 38°26′19″N 76°39′20″W
- Area: less than one acre
- Built: c. 1815
- MPS: Tobacco Barns of Southern Maryland
- NRHP reference No.: 15000941
- Added to NRHP: December 29, 2015

The De La Brooke Tobacco Barn is a historic tobacco barn in rural northern St. Mary's County, Maryland. It is located in a clearing on the north side of Delabrooke Road, about 1.5 miles (2.4 km) east of Maryland Route 6, north of Oraville. The barn measures 36 feet by 42 feet 6 inches (11 m × 13 m) and is oriented with its gable ends southeast and northwest. Built about 1815 (or possibly somewhat earlier), it is a well-preserved example of a period tobacco drying barn, which also utilizes a unique internal system of tier poles inside. It is part of the Cremona Farm estate.

The barn was listed on the National Register of Historic Places in 2015.

== See also ==
- National Register of Historic Places listings in St. Mary's County, Maryland
