= Harry Fowler (disambiguation) =

Harry Fowler (1926–2012) was an English actor.

Harry Fowler may also refer to:

- Harry Llewellyn Fowler (1895–?), Canadian co-operative organiser
- Rem Fowler (Harry Rembrandt Fowler, 1882–1963), British motorcycle racer
- Harry Fowler, political candidate in Edmonton West
- Harry Fowler, tennis player in 2009 French Open – Boys' doubles etc.
- Harry M. Fowler, cinematographer for Nuts in May (film)

== See also ==
- Henry Fowler (disambiguation)
- Harold Fowler (disambiguation)
