= Cremona Farm =

Coordinates: 38°27′22″N 76°39′25″W

Cremona Farm is a 1275-acre estate comprising a 650-acre former slave plantation and surrounding lands in Mechanicsville, Maryland, on the west bank of the Patuxent River. The estate is under perpetual conservation easements with the Maryland Environmental Trust and Patuxent Tidewater Land Trust, and owned by a non-profit foundation, the Cremona Foundation.

There are over 40 buildings and structures including the historic De La Brooke Tobacco Barn, horse trails, formal gardens, a vineyard, and a wide range of habitats for wildlife on the combined Cremona and De La Brooke estates.

Activities on the site include archaeological digs, terrapin research, and foxhunting.

== History ==
The core estate, a 650-acre tract, has been owned by four families since its first colonial acquisition in the seventeenth century.

Some time between 1649 and 1658, Lord Baltimore granted the land to English settler John Ashcomb. He named the estate West Ashcom (an accompanying parcel on the east bank of the river was named East Ashcom).

The Ashcombs ran the plantation for several generations until the War of 1812. Much of their property was likely destroyed then. After the war, the family sold the estate to William Thomas. Thomas built the still-standing manor house (now known as Main House) in 1819, and renamed the property Cremona. Several other structures of that era remain standing, including tobacco sheds and a slave cabin now called Sam's Cabin, after the man who was born enslaved on the property and lived there after emancipation until the 1930s. There are estimated to have been upwards of twenty enslaved people at a time at Cremona.

The third owner was Air Force Major General Howard Calhoun Davidson, who purchased Cremona in 1930. He converted the estate to a "gentleman's farm," raising Aberdeen Angus cattle and adding luxurious amenities such as a tennis court, swimming pool, and shooting range.

In 1966, economist Norton Dodge purchased the estate. He took several steps which lowered property taxes and ensured the estate would remain intact in perpetuity. In 1971, he established the Cremona Foundation, and later put Cremona under conservation easements. Over the ensuing decades, he expanded the holdings by purchasing the adjoining De La Brooke estate and other lands to bring Cremona Farm to its current size. After Dodge's death in 2011, his widow Nancy Ruyle Dodge transferred the property to the foundation.
