= Mechanicsville, Maryland =

- Census-designated place
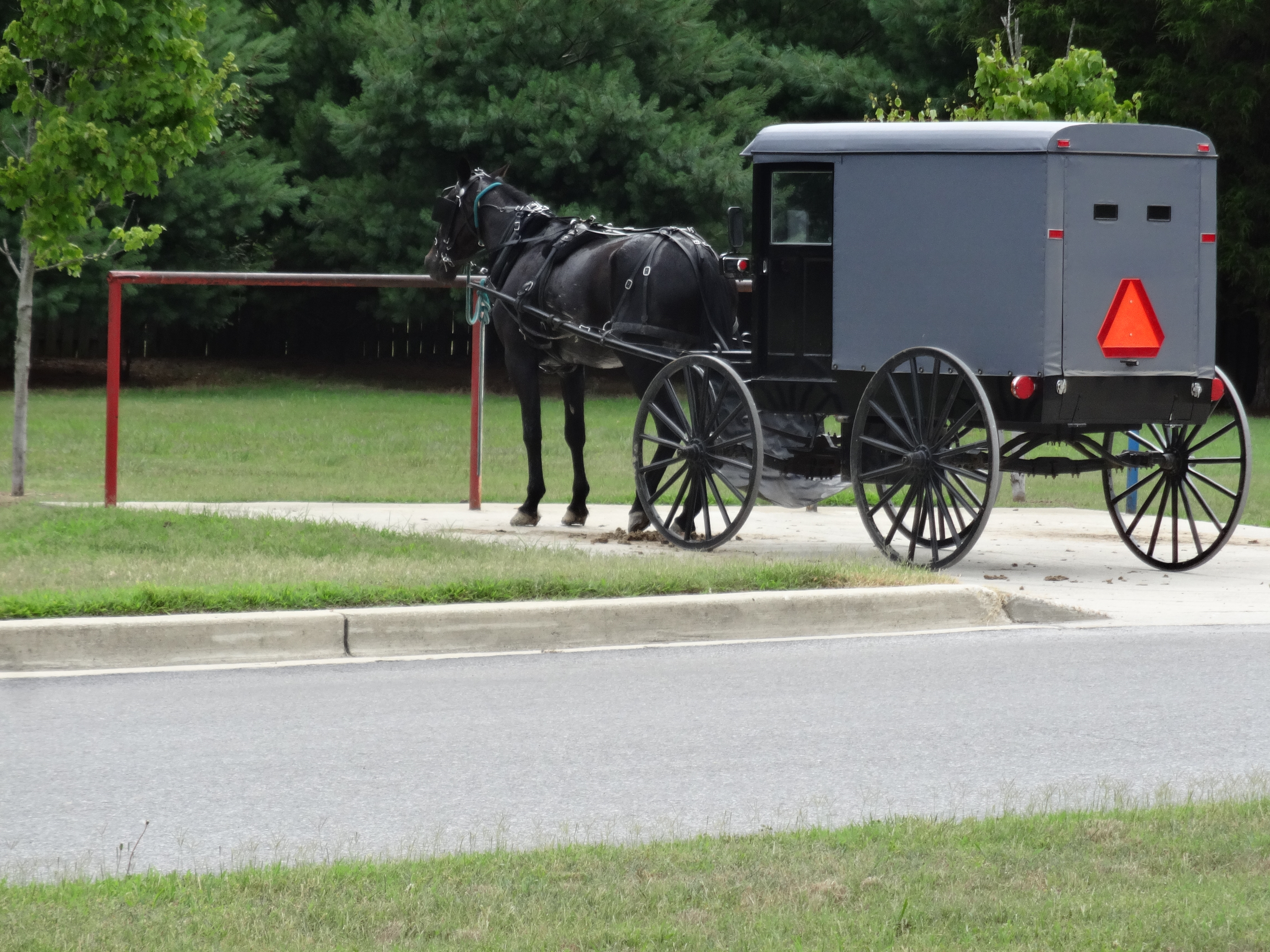
- Amish horse and buggy parking space, July 2016

- Location within Maryland Location within the United States
- Coordinates: 38°26′34″N 76°44′38″W
- Country: United States
- State: Maryland
- County: St. Mary's

Area
  - Total: 5.20 sq mi (13.46 km^{2})
  - Land: 5.19 sq mi (13.44 km^{2})
  - Water: 0.0039 sq mi (0.01 km^{2})
- Elevation: 157 ft (48 m)

Population (2020)
  - Total: 1,673
  - Density: 322.3/sq mi (124.46/km^{2})
- Time zone: UTC−5 (Eastern (EST))
  - Summer (DST): UTC−4 (EDT)
- ZIP code: 20659
- Area codes: 301, 240
- GNIS feature ID: 594822

Mechanicsville is an unincorporated community and census-designated place in St. Mary's County, Maryland, United States. It is adjacent to the community of Charlotte Hall, which is known for its agriculture, Amish population, and the Maryland Veterans Home. Mechanicsville has many small businesses and restaurants along Maryland Route 5 and Maryland Route 235, as well as an enclosed Amish produce market. The community is served by the St. Mary's County Public Schools, including Chopticon High School. At the 2010 census, Mechanicsville had a population of 1,528.

The Amish community in the Mechanicsville area consists of eight church districts and approximately 1,000 people. The Amish first came to the area in 1940. There is also an Old Order Mennonite community in the Mechanisville area. In recent years, increasing development has threatened the Amish community.

== History ==
Part of the area was first settled in the 1660s by early Maryland colonists who were tobacco planters. They established some farms not far from the Patuxent river. In 1819, Cremona Farm, a 750-acre estate and plantation was built in the same location. In about 1850, "Mechanicsville Village" was established on the historic Three Notch Trail. The name "Mechanicsville" is believed to have come from the word "Mechanic" because the area became a center for blacksmiths and other craftsmen. In those days "Mechanic" meant a skilled tradesperson who worked by hands.

There was an old railway that passed through Mechanicsville and local residents joined other St. Mary's County residents in purchasing it and saving it from being scrapped in 1918. Farm goods moved along the railroad on train cars and passenger service continued until about 1928. By that time county roads had improved and the railway began to fall out of use.

The Amish community was established in Mechanicsville in 1940. It is a Lancaster County, Pennsylvania, daughter settlement. The Amish left Lancaster County because of a dispute with the state of Pennsylvania over education practices. The Amish people had their own system of one room schoolhouses there and a school year that better accommodated the farm season. But Pennsylvania tried to force them into the state school system. Maryland provided a place for the Lancaster Amish to escape these pressures and, as historian Karen Johnson-Weiner described, avoid “what they saw as a threat to their religious identity”. Many Amish left at the time and one large group moved to Mechanicsville, Maryland. Today, the Amish settlement in Mechanicsville is one of the largest Lancaster daughter communities.

== Demographics ==
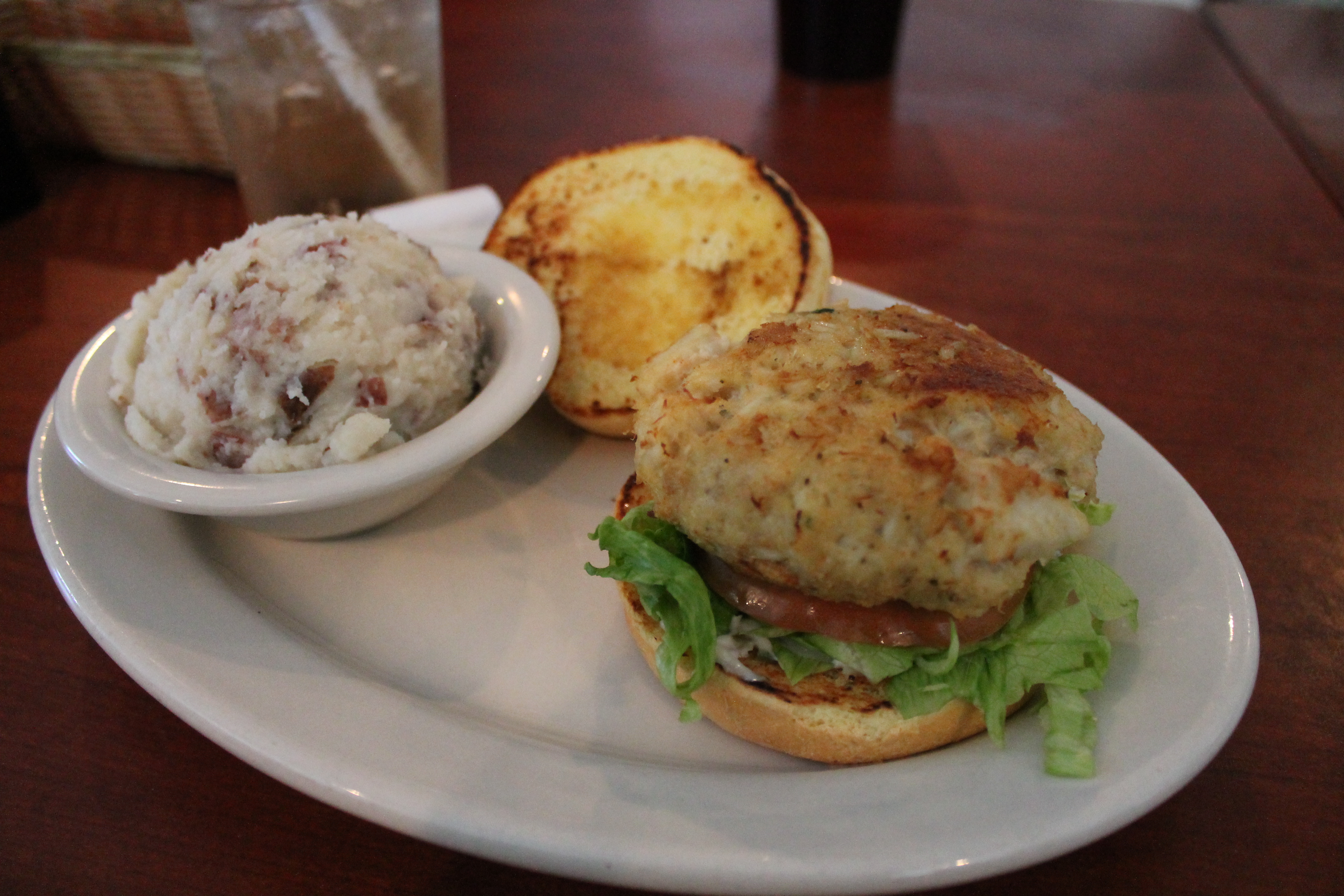
Traditional local food, crabcake sandwich and garlic mashed potatoes

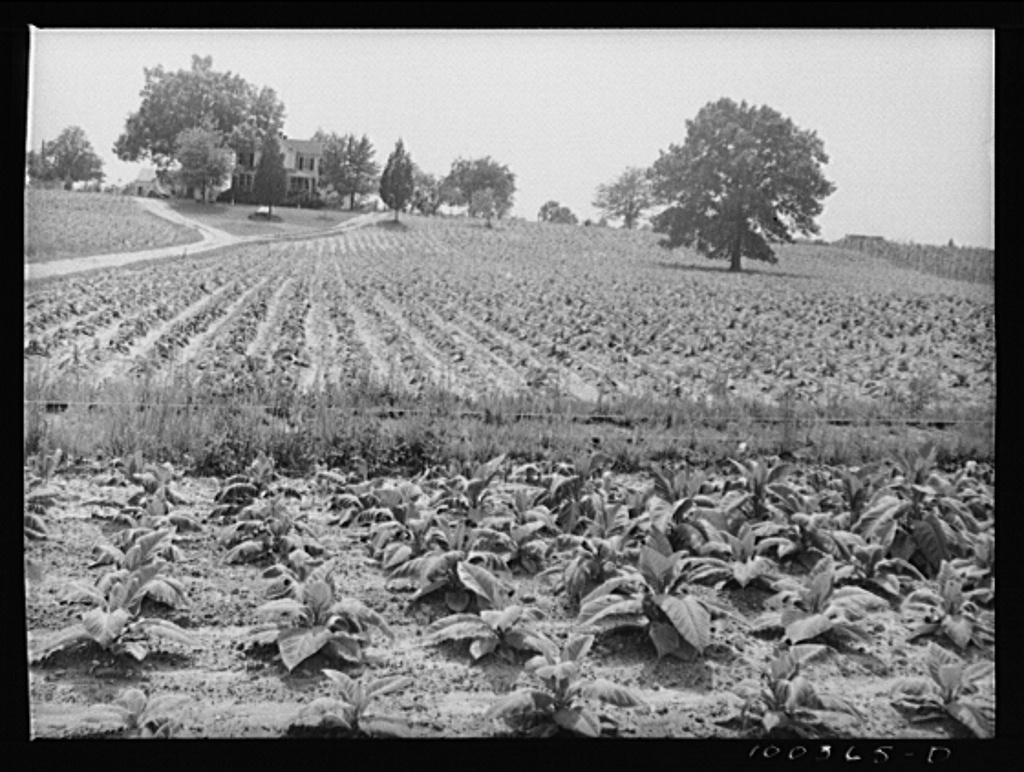
Tobacco farm in Mechanicsville in 1942

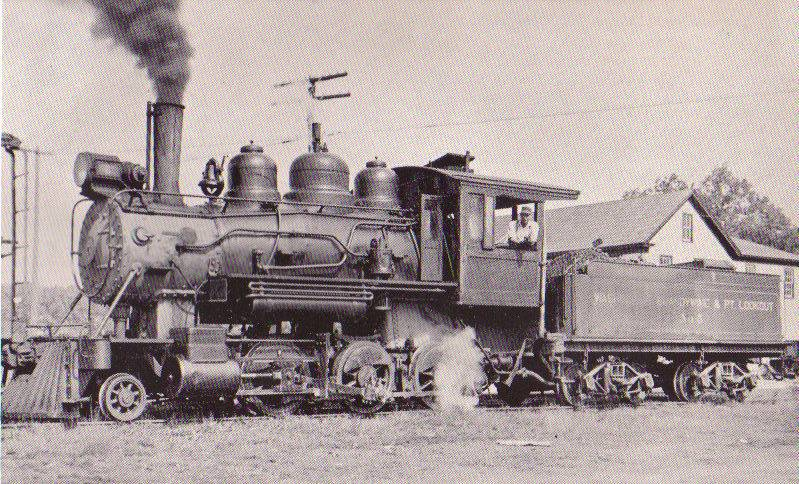
Engine 5, of the Washington, Brandywine and Point Lookout Railroad, picture taken in Mechanicsville in 1934

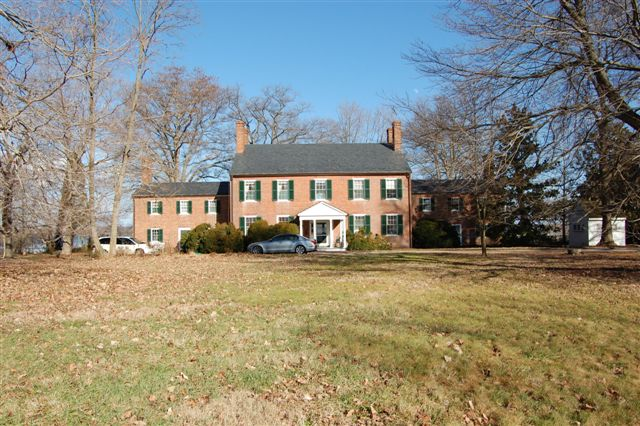
Cremona Farm in Mechanicsville, built in 1819.

=== 2020 census ===
As of the 2020 census, Mechanicsville had a population of 1,673. The median age was 43.0 years. 24.6% of residents were under the age of 18 and 13.0% of residents were 65 years of age or older. For every 100 females there were 115.9 males, and for every 100 females age 18 and over there were 117.2 males age 18 and over.

0.0% of residents lived in urban areas, while 100.0% lived in rural areas.

There were 581 households in Mechanicsville, of which 36.3% had children under the age of 18 living in them. Of all households, 65.7% were married-couple households, 10.8% were households with a male householder and no spouse or partner present, and 15.5% were households with a female householder and no spouse or partner present. About 10.5% of all households were made up of individuals and 4.0% had someone living alone who was 65 years of age or older.

There were 602 housing units, of which 3.5% were vacant. The homeowner vacancy rate was 0.0% and the rental vacancy rate was 2.0%.

Racial composition as of the 2020 census
Race	Number	Percent
White	1,433	85.7%
Black or African American	98	5.9%
American Indian and Alaska Native	9	0.5%
Asian	12	0.7%
Native Hawaiian and Other Pacific Islander	1	0.1%
Some other race	9	0.5%
Two or more races	111	6.6%
Hispanic or Latino (of any race)	58	3.5%

=== Demographic estimates ===
Ethnic heritage
Irish 33.3%, German 32.4%, French (except Basque) 16.6%, English 13.9%, Polish 9.5%, African-American 5.9%, Italian 5.4%, Scottish 1.5%, Norwegian 0.8%, American Indian 0.5%.

=== Income and education ===
- Median household income: $99,041
- High school or equivalent degree: 40.9%
- Some college, no degree: 10.7%
- Associate degree: 2.7%
- Bachelor's degree: 20.5%
- Graduate or professional degree: 11.4%
- Bachelor's Degree or higher: 31.9%

Historical population
Census	Pop.	Note	%±
1930	1,734		—
1940	1,696		−2.2%
2010	1,528		—
2020	1,673		9.5%
US Federal 2020 Census (Includes 2010 Census); St. Mary's County 1940 Census (includes 1930 Census data)

== Climate ==
The climate in this area is characterized by hot, humid summers and generally cool to cold winters. According to the Köppen Climate Classification system, Mechanicsville has a humid subtropical climate, abbreviated "Cfa" on climate maps. In the spring and summer the area gets frequent thunderstorms, many severe, and on rare occasion, tornadoes. From June 2021 to June 2022 Mechanicsville had 41 severe thunderstorm warnings.

=== 2022 Tornado ===
On June 8, 2022, a severe thunderstorm developed a tornado that touched down in Mechanicsville, damaging farm buildings and a residential home, uprooting some trees and snapping other tree trunks.

=== Monthly weather averages ===
Climate data for Mechanicsville, Maryland (1991–2020 normals, extremes 1974-present)
Month	Jan	Feb	Mar	Apr	May	Jun	Jul	Aug	Sep	Oct	Nov	Dec	Year
Record high °F (°C)	81 (27)	81 (27)	91 (33)	94 (34)	94 (34)	99 (37)	103 (39)	101 (38)	100 (38)	90 (32)	82 (28)	80 (27)	103 (39)
Mean maximum °F (°C)	67 (19)	69 (21)	78 (26)	87 (31)	88 (31)	92 (33)	94 (34)	92 (33)	88 (31)	81 (27)	75 (24)	67 (19)	95 (35)
Mean daily maximum °F (°C)	44.2 (6.8)	47.6 (8.7)	55.9 (13.3)	67.3 (19.6)	73.7 (23.2)	81.5 (27.5)	85.3 (29.6)	83.3 (28.5)	76.7 (24.8)	66.1 (18.9)	57.3 (14.1)	48.1 (8.9)	65.6 (18.7)
Daily mean °F (°C)	34.5 (1.4)	36.9 (2.7)	44.2 (6.8)	54.9 (12.7)	62.9 (17.2)	71.2 (21.8)	75.6 (24.2)	73.8 (23.2)	67.2 (19.6)	55.9 (13.3)	46.4 (8.0)	38.3 (3.5)	55.2 (12.9)
Mean daily minimum °F (°C)	24.8 (−4.0)	26.2 (−3.2)	32.6 (0.3)	42.5 (5.8)	52.0 (11.1)	60.9 (16.1)	65.9 (18.8)	64.2 (17.9)	57.7 (14.3)	45.7 (7.6)	35.5 (1.9)	28.6 (−1.9)	44.7 (7.1)
Mean minimum °F (°C)	9 (−13)	13 (−11)	18 (−8)	29 (−2)	38 (3)	49 (9)	57 (14)	56 (13)	45 (7)	32 (0)	23 (−5)	15 (−9)	6 (−14)
Record low °F (°C)	−7 (−22)	−9 (−23)	5 (−15)	21 (−6)	30 (−1)	40 (4)	45 (7)	41 (5)	35 (2)	20 (−7)	14 (−10)	0 (−18)	−9 (−23)
Average precipitation inches (mm)	3.29 (84)	2.97 (75)	4.24 (108)	3.31 (84)	4.32 (110)	4.19 (106)	4.57 (116)	4.84 (123)	4.87 (124)	4.18 (106)	3.34 (85)	3.99 (101)	48.11 (1,222)
Average snowfall inches (cm)	5.0 (13)	6.2 (16)	1.8 (4.6)	0.1 (0.25)	0 (0)	0 (0)	0 (0)	0 (0)	0 (0)	0 (0)	0 (0)	2.0 (5.1)	15.1 (38)
Average extreme snow depth inches (cm)	4 (10)	4 (10)	2 (5.1)	0 (0)	0 (0)	0 (0)	0 (0)	0 (0)	0 (0)	0 (0)	0 (0)	2 (5.1)	6 (15)
Average precipitation days (≥ 0.01 in)	10	9	10	10	11	10	10	9	9	8	8	9	115
Average snowy days (≥ 0.1 in)	2	2	1	0	0	0	0	0	0	0	0	1	5
Source: NOAA

== Notable people ==
- Jerome Adams, former Surgeon General of the United States and former Indiana state health commissioner.
- Henry J. Fowler, businessman and member of the Maryland House of Delegates
- Rep. Steny Hoyer, member of the Democratic Party who was the House Majority Leader and was also the House Minority Whip of the House of Representatives.
- Daryl Thompson, Major League Baseball pitcher and a 2003 graduate of La Plata High School
- Norton Dodge, owner and longtime resident of Cremona Farm, economist, collector of Soviet era art, smuggled thousands of Soviet dissident paintings, prints and sculptures out of communist Russia, amassing one of the largest collections of Soviet-era art outside of the Soviet Union. He secretly stored them at his farm in Mechanicsville.
