= Henry J. Fowler =

American politician and businessman

Henry John Fowler Sr. (1909 – July 23, 1989) was a businessman and politician from Mechanicsville, Maryland who served as a Democratic member of the Maryland House of Delegates from 1950 to 1971.

Fowler was a president of the Maryland Jousting Tournament Association, and as a state delegate, wrote successful legislation to make jousting the official state sport of Maryland.

There is no known connection to another Henry Fowler, who also served as a Democratic delegate from St. Mary's County from 1834 to 1836 before moving to Wisconsin.
