= Henry Fowler (American politician) =

American farmer and politician

Henry Fowler (September 9, 1799 - ?) was a farmer and local politician who served as a member of both the Maryland House of Delegates and the Wisconsin State Assembly during terms ranging from 1834 to 1872.

== Biography ==
Fowler was born on September 9, 1799, in St. Mary's County, Maryland. He came to Wisconsin about 1852, and settled in the Town of Milwaukee in Milwaukee County, Wisconsin, and was a farmer by trade.

== Political career ==
Fowler was a member of the House of Delegates for St. Mary's County from 1834 to 1836 and was also a member of the St. Mary's County Board of Commissioners. He would serve in the Wisconsin Assembly during the 1865, 1867 and 1872 sessions. When the 25th Wisconsin Legislature convened in January of 1872, Fowler at age 72 was its oldest member, just as he had been tied for that honor in the 18th Wisconsin Legislature.

Other positions Fowler held included member of the board of supervisors (similar to a city council) of the Town of Milwaukee, and of the Milwaukee County Board of Supervisors. He was a Democrat.

He does not seem to be connected to the Henry J. Fowler who would serve as a Democratic member of the House of Delegates from St. Mary's County from 1951–1970.
