= 2024 ProMX Championship =

Australian Motocross Championship in 2024

The 2024 ProMX Motocross Championship season (known for sponsorship reasons as the Penrite ProMX Motocross Championship presented by AMX Superstores), is the fourth Australian Motocross Championship season under the ProMX moniker.

The series includes eight rounds across four different states. All events except the fourth round and the final round are a one-day format.

Dean Ferris goes into the season as the reigning champion in the MX1 class, after winning his fourth MX1 title in the previous season. Wilson Todd won his fourth MX2 title in 2023, but will not defend his title as he moves into the MX1 class for 2024.

For the first time in the history of the championship, the MX1 class has been awarded FIM Oceania status, meaning that the class will also act as the FIM Oceania Motocross Championship.

== Race calendar and results ==
=== MX1 ===
Round	Date	Location	Race 1 Winner	Race 2 Winner	Race 3 Winner	Round Winner
1	17 March	(Victoria (state)) Wonthaggi	(Australia) Kyle Webster	(Australia) Kyle Webster	-	(Australia) Kyle Webster
2	7 April	(Victoria (state)) Horsham	(Australia) Nathan Crawford	(Australia) Jed Beaton	-	(Australia) Jed Beaton
3	5 May	(South Australia) Gillman	(Australia) Kyle Webster	(Australia) Kyle Webster	-	(Australia) Kyle Webster
4	25-26 May	(New South Wales) Maitland	(Australia) Nathan Crawford	(Australia) Kyle Webster	(Australia) Kyle Webster	(Australia) Kyle Webster
5	23 June	(South Australia) Murray Bridge	(Australia) Kyle Webster	(Australia) Kyle Webster	-	(Australia) Kyle Webster
6	21 July	(Queensland) Toowoomba	(Australia) Kyle Webster	(Australia) Jed Beaton	-	(Australia) Jed Beaton
7	11 August	(Queensland) Gympie	(Australia) Kyle Webster	(Australia) Jed Beaton	-	(Australia) Kyle Webster
8	17-18 August	(Queensland) QLD Moto Park	(Australia) Jed Beaton	(Australia) Jed Beaton	-	(Australia) Jed Beaton

=== MX2 ===
Round	Date	Location	Race 1 Winner	Race 2 Winner	Race 3 Winner	Round Winner
1	17 March	(Victoria (state)) Wonthaggi	(Australia) Noah Ferguson	(New Zealand) Brodie Connolly	-	(New Zealand) Brodie Connolly
2	7 April	(Victoria (state)) Horsham	(New Zealand) Brodie Connolly	(New Zealand) Brodie Connolly	-	(New Zealand) Brodie Connolly
3	5 May	(South Australia) Gillman	(New Zealand) Brodie Connolly	(New Zealand) Brodie Connolly	-	(New Zealand) Brodie Connolly
4	25-26 May	(New South Wales) Maitland	(Australia) Ryder Kingsford	(Australia) Noah Ferguson	(Australia) Ryder Kingsford	(Australia) Ryder Kingsford
5	23 June	(South Australia) Murray Bridge	(New Zealand) Brodie Connolly	(Australia) Alex Larwood	-	(Australia) Alex Larwood
6	21 July	(Queensland) Toowoomba	(Australia) Kaleb Barham	(New Zealand) Brodie Connolly	-	(New Zealand) Brodie Connolly
7	11 August	(Queensland) Gympie	(New Zealand) Brodie Connolly	(New Zealand) Brodie Connolly	-	(New Zealand) Brodie Connolly
8	17-18 August	(Queensland) QLD Moto Park	(New Zealand) Brodie Connolly	(New Zealand) Brodie Connolly	-	(New Zealand) Brodie Connolly

=== Circuit locations ===
2024 ProMX Championship locations

== MX1 ==
=== Participants ===
Team	Constructor	No	Rider	Rounds
CDR Yamaha Monster Energy Team	Yamaha	1	(Australia) Dean Ferris	1–4
CDR Yamaha Monster Energy Team	Yamaha	14	(Australia) Jed Beaton	All
Empire Kawasaki	Kawasaki	4	(Australia) Luke Clout	All
Gas Gas Racing Team	Gas Gas	5	(Australia) Kirk Gibbs	All
Hunter Valley Steel	Kawasaki	7	(Australia) Harrison Foster	1, 4, 6–8
Rising Motorsports Racing Team	Husqvarna	8	(Australia) Zachary Watson	All
Team HRC Honda Racing Australia	Honda	9	(Netherlands) Lars van Berkel	5
Team HRC Honda Racing Australia	Honda	20	(Australia) Wilson Todd	1–2, 7–8
Team HRC Honda Racing Australia	Honda	96	(Australia) Kyle Webster	All
Belshs Gardening/Bridgeland Motorcycles	Honda	10	(Australia) Levi McManus	1
WBR Bulk Nutrients Yamaha	Yamaha	11	(Australia) Bailey Malkiewicz	4
WBR Bulk Nutrients Yamaha	Yamaha	145	(New Zealand) Maximus Purvis	7–8
Beard Brothers Motorcycles	KTM	15	(Australia) Seth Hardman	4
WBR Motorcycles/OatesMX	Yamaha	16	(Australia) Braeden Krebs	1–2
Hunter Valley Motorcycles	Kawasaki	21	(Australia) Lachlan Foster	4
Ace Wholesalers	Honda	22	(Australia) Jesse Bishop	7
Caloundra Motorcycle Centre/Beta Australia	Beta	23	(Australia) Levi Rogers	1–7
Caloundra Motorcycle Centre/Beta Australia	Beta	132	(Australia) Andrew Wilksch	7–8
GO24 Racing Team	Kawasaki	24	(Australia) Brett Metcalfe	All
Dubbo City Motorcycles	KTM	25	(Australia) Blake Fox	4
Dixie Holdings/Ace Haulage	KTM	27	(Australia) Liam Atkinson	6–7
MXExpress/Lusty Industries/Truckserv	Yamaha	28	(Australia) Cooper Holroyd	All
2NINE Motorsports	Yamaha	29	(Australia) Navrin Grothues	1–6
Team XLR	Husqvarna	31	(Australia) Joel Phillips	1–2
R31/Mountain Raceshop	Kawasaki	31	(Australia) James Davison	4–6
Mick Muldoon Motorcycles	Kawasaki	32	(Australia) Joel Cigliano	All
Simpson Crash/Simpson Signs	Husqvarna	33	(Australia) Jacob Simpson	3, 5
Simpson Crash/Simpson Signs	Husqvarna	66	(Australia) Mitchell Simpson	3
TLR Racing	Yamaha	35	(Australia) Ricky Latimer	1–2
TLR Racing	Yamaha	69	(Australia) Lochie Latimer	1, 7
Matt Jones Motorcycles	Kawasaki	36	(Australia) Max Closter	2
Xtreme MX Gear/SWS Imports	KTM	38	(Australia) Bryce Ognenis	1–5
Brisbane Motorcycles	Yamaha	40	(Australia) Kye Orchard	1–2, 4–8
Team NAMI	KTM	42	(Australia) Brock Ninness	4
Thriller Motorsports KTM	KTM	43	(Australia) Jack Miller	6
Cullys Yamaha	Yamaha	45	(Australia) John Darroch	1, 3, 5
Cullys Yamaha	Yamaha	46	(Australia) Ayden Bridgeford	5
Mellross Homes/KTM Newcastle	KTM	45	(Australia) Hayden Mellross	7–8
Raceline Husqvarna Tdub Racing Team	Husqvarna	47	(Australia) Todd Waters	All
Moto1 Motorcycles/Underclass	Honda	49	(Australia) Cody O'Loan	All
Monster Energy Army/Bridgestone/Twisted	Yamaha	50	(Australia) Jason West	8
EFS Solar Racing	Husqvarna	51	(Australia) Robbie Marshall	1–4, 6–8
R&D Husky/Lusty Industries	Husqvarna	52	(Australia) Jyle Campbell	4
Honda Genuine Red Ride	Honda	56	(Australia) Riley Stephens	1–4, 6–8
Honda Genuine Red Ride	Honda	62	(Australia) Dylan Wood	2–3
The Underclass/Pet Fresh	Yamaha	57	(Australia) Charlie Creech	1
Froth Honda Australia	Honda	70	(Australia) Ben Novak	4–5, 7–8
BetterByDirt	KTM	71	(Australia) Seth Jackson	4
Novak Signs	KTM	71	(Australia) Kane Novak	7–8
BLS Suspension/Alpine Motorcycles	Yamaha	79	(Australia) Jacob Sweet	7–8
MXstore/Brisbane Motorcycles	Yamaha	81	(Australia) Joel Evans	1–6, 8
OatesMX/Elite Edge Fitness	Yamaha	82	(Australia) Elijah Wiese	2–3, 5
Ride Red Privateer Program	Honda	84	(Australia) Siegah Ward	All
Winner Motorcycles	KTM	86	(Australia) Jett Kipps	1–7
Winner Motorcycles	KTM	88	(Australia) Riley Fucsko	1–3, 5–6
Two Wheel Obsession	Yamaha	98	(Australia) Blake Waldon	1, 5
Elliott Brothers Gas Gas Racing	Gas Gas	102	(Australia) Matt Moss	4–5
Whinner Motorcycles/Rigid Racks	KTM	119	(Australia) Cooper Krezlik	1–3, 5
Dexcon Electrical/Peter Stevens Motorcycles	KTM	129	(Australia) Jake Dezwart	3
	KTM	141	(Australia) Nicholas Tiver	3
CML KTM Racing	KTM	153	(New Zealand) Hamish Harwood	8
Raceline Performance/Trac-Rite Suspension	Husqvarna	162	(Australia) Luke Zielinski	All
Brisbane Motorcycles/00 Elite Rider Training	KTM	168	(Australia) Zhane Dunlop	4–6
KAYROC Welding & Maintenance	KTM	169	(Australia) Julius Richards	8
Trademark Signs/Next Generation Electrix	Yamaha	174	(Australia) Sam Larsen	1–3, 5–7
	Gas Gas	184	(Australia) Trent Dyer	1
KTM Racing Team	KTM	199	(Australia) Nathan Crawford	All
New Image Landscapes/Apro Motorsports	KTM	202	(Australia) Connor Rossandich	1–4
Steelo's Transport/UniFilter Australia	Yamaha	204	(Australia) Brandon Steel	2–3
Elliott Bros MPE	Gas Gas	215	(Australia) Liam Jackson	3–8
R31/Mountain Raceshop	Kawasaki	231	(Australia) James Davison	7
	Yamaha	241	(Australia) Levi Sayer	1, 4, 7–8
Ballina Motorcycles/Hostile Handwear	KTM	292	(Australia) Brock Smith	8
Moto Kit/Pro Moto Suspension	Honda	322	(Australia) Jeremy Waters	1
	Gas Gas	331	(Australia) Jackson Mitchell	4
PJS Transport/MXRP	KTM	415	(Australia) Cody Schat	All
Peak Air Conditioning/Contour Works	Husqvarna	485	(Australia) Caleb Ward	6–8
	Honda	751	(Australia) Tony Corvasce	7

=== Riders Championship ===
Points are awarded to finishers of the main races, in the following format:

Position	1st	2nd	3rd	4th	5th	6th	7th	8th	9th	10th	11th	12th	13th	14th	15th	16th	17th	18th	19th	20th
Points	25	22	20	18	16	15	14	13	12	11	10	9	8	7	6	5	4	3	2	1

Pos	Rider	Bike	WON (Victoria (state))		HOR (Victoria (state))		GIL (South Australia)		MAI (New South Wales)			MUR (South Australia)		TOO (Queensland)		GYM (Queensland)		QLD (Queensland)		Points
1	(Australia) Kyle Webster	Honda	1	1	3	5	1	1	5	1	1	1	1	1	2	1	2	3	5	382
2	(Australia) Jed Beaton	Yamaha	2	2	2	1	2	2	2	2	2	2	2	2	1	6	1	1	1	382
3	(Australia) Nathan Crawford	KTM	7	4	1	2	4	7	1	3	3	5	4	3	3	3	16	5	11	301
4	(Australia) Kirk Gibbs	Gas Gas	8	8	5	3	7	4	4	4	4	3	3	4	8	4	3	4	2	297
5	(Australia) Luke Clout	Kawasaki	5	6	4	6	6	6	3	5	5	Ret	DNS	11	5	2	5	2	3	252
6	(Australia) Todd Waters	Husqvarna	6	9	8	9	5	3	7	6	6	6	6	5	6	9	7	10	6	245
7	(Australia) Brett Metcalfe	Kawasaki	9	7	7	7	8	8	6	9	7	4	7	9	9	5	19	11	12	214
8	(Australia) Zachary Watson	Husqvarna	11	10	11	10	9	15	8	8	8	9	8	7	7	7	6	8	9	206
9	(Australia) Joel Evans	Yamaha	10	12	10	12	12	10	9	11	10	8	9	8	12			9	13	160
10	(Australia) Wilson Todd	Honda	3	5	6	8										10	8	7	7	116
11	(Australia) Luke Zielinski	Husqvarna	17	11	16	Ret	Ret	Ret	13	12	9	16	12	10	18	12	13	13	14	108
12	(Australia) Dean Ferris	Yamaha	4	3	9	4	3	5	DNS	DNS	DNS									104
13	(Australia) Cooper Holroyd	Yamaha	13	14	12	16	13	12	17	17	16	Ret	DNS	18	17	21	11	17	19	82
14	(Australia) Caleb Ward	Husqvarna												6	4	8	9	12	8	80
15	(Australia) Cody O'Loan	Honda	19	16	20	17	21	11	21	19	14	19	17	12	14	17	14	16	15	75
16	(Australia) Levi Rogers	Beta	18	Ret	15	11	10	Ret	20	Ret	22	10	15	14	10	Ret	DNS			65
17	(Australia) Siegah Ward	Honda	16	13	17	15	15	13	22	Ret	15	13	Ret	20	22	22	17	15	27	62
18	(Australia) Bryce Ognenis	KTM	15	22	14	13	22	18	14	13	12	15	13							62
19	(Australia) Sam Larsen	Yamaha	23	19	21	18	19	14				11	10	15	15	14	Ret			53
20	(Australia) Liam Jackson	Gas Gas					14	Ret	18	22	11	18	11	Ret	16	19	12	Ret	18	52
21	(New Zealand) Maximus Purvis	Yamaha														11	4	Ret	4	46
22	(Australia) Dylan Wood	Honda			13	14	11	9												37
23	(Australia) John Darroch	Yamaha	12	17			16	Ret				12	14							34
24	(Netherlands) Lars van Berkel	Honda										7	5							30
25	(Australia) Ben Novak	Honda							19	18	17	14	16			24	18	20	17	29
26	(Australia) Robbie Marshall	Husqvarna	20	27	Ret	26	18	17	25	20	Ret			16	13	23	21	19	20	28
27	(Australia) Liam Atkinson	KTM												13	11	16	15			28
28	(New Zealand) Hamish Harwood	KTM																6	10	26
29	(Australia) Hayden Mellross	KTM														13	10	14	DNS	26
30	(Australia) Connor Rossandich	KTM	25	30	18	24	17	16	16	15	18									26
31	(Australia) Bailey Malkiewicz	Yamaha							11	7	DNS									24
32	(Australia) Blake Fox	KTM							10	14	19									20
33	(Australia) Matt Moss	Gas Gas							12	10	Ret	Ret	DNS							20
34	(Australia) Jyle Campbell	Husqvarna							15	16	13									19
35	(Australia) Cody Schat	KTM	29	26	23	25	20	19	23	23	21	17	18	17	19	27	23	21	23	16
36	(Australia) Ricky Latimer	Yamaha	14	15	Ret	DNS														13
37	(Australia) Andrew Wilksch	Beta														15	20	Ret	16	12
38	(Australia) Jacob Sweet	Yamaha														18	Ret	18	24	6
39	(Australia) Kye Orchard	Yamaha	26	28	25	20			27	21	30	20	21	19	20	25	22	22	Ret	5
40	(Australia) Braeden Krebs	Yamaha	31	Ret	19	19														4
41	(Australia) Lochie Latimer	Yamaha	21	18												20	Ret			4
42	(Australia) Zhane Dunlop	KTM							35	27	Ret	25	19	DNS	DNS					2
43	(Australia) Harrison Foster	Kawasaki	35	32					30	26	20			27	DNS	30	Ret	Ret	28	1
44	(Australia) Joel Phillips	Husqvarna	24	20	Ret	DNS														1
45	(Australia) Navrin Grothues	Yamaha	28	24	22	21	23	20	28	24	24	22	22	24	DNS					1
46	(Australia) Riley Fucsko	Husqvarna	Ret	23	30	Ret	29	24				21	20	Ret	DNS					1
	(Australia) Joel Cigliano	Kawasaki	30	34	Ret	23	25	23	Ret	30	Ret	23	23	21	23	28	24	23	21	0
	(Australia) Jett Kipps	Husqvarna	36	29	31	22	30	25	32	29	25	27	26	25	21	Ret	DNS			0
	(Australia) Levi McManus	Honda	22	21																0
	(Australia) Elijah Wiese	Yamaha			28	28	26	21				26	24							0
	(Australia) Riley Stephens	Honda	33	31	26	27	24	Ret	24	31	23			22	25	29	26	25	25	0
	(Australia) Cooper Krezlik	KTM	34	33	24	29	28	22				24	25							0
	(Australia) Jason West	Yamaha																Ret	22	0
	(Australia) Jack Miller	KTM												23	24					0
	(Australia) Levi Sayer	Yamaha	32	35					31	33	28					Ret	25	24	26	0
	(Australia) Brock Ninness	KTM							26	25	Ret									0
	(Australia) Charlie Creech	Yamaha	27	25																0
	(Australia) James Davison	Kawasaki							34	34	27	28	27	26	26					0
	(Australia) Jesse Bishop	Honda														26	27			0
	(Australia) Jake Dezwart	KTM					31	26												0
	(Australia) Seth Jackson	KTM							33	32	26									0
	(Australia) Brandon Steel	Yamaha			27	31	27	27												0
	(Australia) Jacob Simpson	Husqvarna					32	28				29	29							0
	(Australia) Jackson Mitchell	Gas Gas							29	28	29									0
	(Australia) Kane Novak	Honda														31	28	Ret	Ret	0
	(Australia) Blake Waldon	Yamaha	Ret	DNS								Ret	28							0
	(Australia) Max Closter	Kawasaki			29	30														0
	(Australia) Brock Smith	KTM																Ret	29	0
	(Australia) Lachlan Foster	Kawasaki							37	35	31									0
	(Australia) Nicholas Tiver	KTM					33	DNS												0
	(Australia) Seth Hardman	KTM							36	DNS	DNS									0
	(Australia) Trent Dyer	Gas Gas	37	Ret																0
	(Australia) Jeremy Waters	Honda	Ret	DNS																0
	(Australia) Tony Corvasce	Honda														Ret	DNS			0
	(Australia) James Davison	Kawasaki														Ret	DNS			0
	(Australia) Julius Richards	KTM																Ret	DNS	0
	(Australia) Mitchell Simpson	Husqvarna					DNS	DNS												0
	(Australia) Ayden Bridgeford	Yamaha										DNS	DNS							0
Pos	Rider	Bike	WON (Victoria (state))		HOR (Victoria (state))		GIL (South Australia)		MAI (New South Wales)			MUR (South Australia)		TOO (Queensland)		GYM (Queensland)		QLD (Queensland)		Points

== MX2 ==
=== Participants ===
Team	Constructor	No	Rider	Rounds
Team HRC Honda Racing Australia	Honda	5	(Australia) Alex Larwood	1, 3–8
Team HRC Honda Racing Australia	Honda	17	(Australia) Charli Cannon	2–4, 7
Team HRC Honda Racing Australia	Honda	29	(Australia) Noah Ferguson	All
Team HRC Honda Racing Australia	Honda	88	(New Zealand) Brodie Connolly	All
Gas Gas Racing Team	Gas Gas	6	(Australia) Byron Dennis	1–4, 6
Yamalube Yamaha Racing	Yamaha	7	(Australia) Jayce Cosford	All
Yamalube Yamaha Racing	Yamaha	16	(Australia) Kaleb Barham	1–4, 6–8
Yamalube Yamaha Racing	Yamaha	21	(Australia) Ryder Kingsford	All
Raceline Husqvarna Racing	Husqvarna	11	(Australia) Jack Mather	All
Raceline Husqvarna Racing	Husqvarna	22	(Australia) Rhys Budd	All
Brianna Tilt Trays	Yamaha	12	(Australia) Seton Broomhall	3
West Coast Motorcycles	KTM	18	(Australia) Myles Gilmore	8
Winner Motorcycles	KTM	19	(Australia) Connar Adams	All
Elliott Brothers Gas Gas Racing	Gas Gas	23	(Australia) George Knight	1–3, 5
Elliott Brothers Gas Gas Racing	Gas Gas	32	(Australia) Liam Andrews	4
Elliott Brothers Gas Gas Racing	Gas Gas	43	(Australia) Mackenzie O'Bree	All
Elliott Brothers Gas Gas Racing	Gas Gas	44	(Australia) Jai Constantinou	1–4
Ride Red Honda	Honda	24	(Australia) Chandler Burns	1
Barry Francis Motorcycles Honda	Honda	26	(Australia) Wade Thompson	1–2
Dixie Holdings Ace Haulage	KTM	27	(Australia) Liam Atkinson	1
MotoGo Yamaha Racing Team	Yamaha	28	(Australia) Cambell Williams	All
EFS Solar Racing	Yamaha	34	(Australia) Cody Rickit	1–4
Banks Race Development	Gas Gas	35	(Australia) Riley Pitman	2–3
Team Green Kawasaki/MotoNational	Kawasaki	36	(Australia) Zane Mackintosh	All
Race Ready Suspension/Underclass	Gas Gas	38	(Australia) Thynan Kean	All
Crownkiwi Alpinestars Honda	Honda	41	(New Zealand) Curtis King	All
Crownkiwi Alpinestars Honda	Honda	110	(New Zealand) Rian King	1–3, 5–8
MTA Turbochargers	Honda	45	(Australia) Jack Kitchen	8
WBR Bulk Nutrients Yamaha	Yamaha	47	(Australia) Bailey Malkiewicz	1–5
	Gas Gas	51	(Australia) Luke Miles	5–6
Rising Motorsports Racing Team	Husqvarna	60	(Australia) Brock Flynn	All
Rising Motorsports Racing Team	Husqvarna	275	(Australia) Travis Olander	All
KTM Racing Team	KTM	66	(Australia) Kayden Minear	All
	Yamaha	69	(Australia) Ryan Kohlenberg	1
Froth Honda Australia	Honda	70	(Australia) Ben Novak	1–3
BetterByDirt/Peter Stevens Motorcycles	Husqvarna	71	(Australia) Seth Jackson	1–3
	Honda	74	(Australia) Bradley Baling	5
Brisbane Motorcycles/Shephard Transport Equipment	Husqvarna	75	(Australia) Jack Kukas	1–2, 4–8
BLS Suspension/Apline Motorcycles	Yamaha	79	(Australia) Jacob Sweet	3–8
Nutrien Honda Racing	Honda	84	(Australia) Emma Milesevic	3–4, 7
Empire Kawasaki	Kawasaki	86	(Australia) Reid Taylor	1–6, 8
Altherm JCR Yamaha	Yamaha	108	(New Zealand) James Scott	6–8
GO24 Racing Team	Kawasaki	118	(Australia) Mitchell Norris	All
	Yamaha	122	(Australia) Macwilliam Walker	1, 6
	Yamaha	151	(Australia) Aiden Bloom	1–2, 4–5
Associated Boiler Inspectors	Yamaha	169	(Australia) Gordon Adrian	6
Brisbane Motorcycles	Kawasaki	185	(Australia) Ryley Fitzpatrick	1–4, 6–8
Elliott Brothers Bendigo	Gas Gas	196	(Australia) Wilson Greiner-Daish	All
Wright Out Trees/Power N Play Shepparton	Yamaha	198	(Australia) Zackariah Wright	2
	Husqvarna	209	(Australia) Bryce Rodney	6
	KTM	284	(Australia) John Bova	4
	Husqvarna	310	(Australia) Brock Hutchins	3
Honda Dream Racing LG	Honda	386	(Japan) Haruki Yokoyama	1–4, 6–8
Shepparton Motorcycles	KTM	415	(Australia) Samuel Armstrong	1–4
	KTM	433	(Australia) Luke Heaphy	7–8
Wonthaggi Motor Cycles	Kawasaki	443	(Australia) Thomas Gadsden	2–3, 5
WearLusty	KTM	461	(Australia) Tyler Egan	7–8
Apex Tyres	Yamaha	591	(Australia) Steel Adams	1–7
Woombye Mechanical Rep./Lucas Civil	KTM	612	(Australia) Tyler Webber	6–7
1300 AutoTrans	KTM	769	(Australia) John Eckel	5

=== Riders Championship ===
Points are awarded to finishers of the main races, in the following format:

Position	1st	2nd	3rd	4th	5th	6th	7th	8th	9th	10th	11th	12th	13th	14th	15th	16th	17th	18th	19th	20th
Points	25	22	20	18	16	15	14	13	12	11	10	9	8	7	6	5	4	3	2	1

Pos	Rider	Bike	WON (Victoria (state))		HOR (Victoria (state))		GIL (South Australia)		MAI (New South Wales)			MUR (South Australia)		TOO (Queensland)		GYM (Queensland)		QLD (Queensland)		Points
1	(New Zealand) Brodie Connolly	Honda	2	1	1	1	1	1	19	8	3	1	2	2	1	1	1	1	1	369
2	(Australia) Kayden Minear	KTM	11	6	4	9	4	2	6	5	8	5	3	6	6	6	5	4	3	279
3	(Australia) Ryder Kingsford	Yamaha	4	2	16	3	7	3	1	7	1	10	4	14	5	11	12	2	6	271
4	(Australia) Noah Ferguson	Honda	1	3	17	2	2	5	7	1	2	8	6	8	11	12	4	5	Ret	256
5	(Australia) Alex Larwood	Honda	5	DNS			3	12	3	3	4	2	1	7	4	8	3	3	4	247
6	(Australia) Jayce Cosford	Yamaha	6	4	8	15	8	7	4	10	6	11	7	3	3	5	15	12	2	235
7	(Australia) Rhys Budd	Husqvarna	9	5	3	7	10	16	10	6	12	3	5	9	9	7	2	9	9	235
8	(Australia) Kaleb Barham	Yamaha	7	10	10	5	15	6	8	13	7			1	7	13	10	8	5	201
9	(Japan) Haruki Yokoyama	Honda	14	13	5	6	13	4	5	4	5			25	21	9	6	6	10	181
10	(Australia) Jack Mather	Husqvarna	8	7	Ret	8	17	20	12	12	9	Ret	9	10	10	4	7	7	7	173
11	(Australia) Cambell Williams	Yamaha	22	22	11	11	11	13	9	11	14	7	10	5	8	2	25	13	8	165
12	(Australia) Jack Kukas	Husqvarna	16	28	Ret	DNS			16	18	11	15	8	13	12	3	8	10	11	118
13	(Australia) Reid Taylor	Kawasaki	13	20	21	10	6	15	DNS	2	10	Ret	DNS	4	2			DNS	DNS	109
14	(Australia) Brock Flynn	Husqvarna	15	9	18	Ret	9	17	13	16	13	4	Ret	12	16	17	9	Ret	Ret	107
15	(Australia) Travis Olander	Husqvarna	18	14	15	Ret	14	10	14	15	15	13	17	Ret	DNS	10	11	14	12	103
16	(New Zealand) Rian King	Honda	17	8	20	14	12	18				6	14	11	13	18	13	15	13	102
17	(Australia) Bailey Malkiewicz	Yamaha	12	15	2	12	Ret	9	2	9	Ret	DNS	DNS							92
18	(Australia) Wilson Greiner-Daish	Gas Gas	19	23	14	13	18	14	17	21	16	9	11	20	15	15	20	Ret	14	79
19	(Australia) Byron Dennis	Gas Gas	3	Ret	6	4	5	11	Ret	DNS	DNS			Ret	DNS					79
20	(Australia) Mackenzie O'Bree	Gas Gas	24	21	12	19	16	Ret	15	17	18	17	15	19	18	14	19	16	15	64
21	(Australia) Thynan Kean	Gas Gas	23	12	13	16	23	23	21	19	17	18	12	15	24	23	16	DNS	20	52
22	(Australia) Jai Constantinou	Gas Gas	10	18	Ret	DNS	19	8	11	14	22									46
23	(Australia) Ryley Fitzpatrick	Kawasaki	20	Ret	9	Ret	21	19	18	20	20			Ret	17	16	18	Ret	Ret	32
24	(Australia) Jacob Sweet	Yamaha					24	25	Ret	24	19	19	13	18	Ret	19	21	17	17	25
25	(New Zealand) Curtis King	Honda	28	27	22	22	29	30	20	23	Ret	12	16	16	20	Ret	24	18	Ret	24
26	(Australia) Ben Novak	Honda	25	16	7	18	20	Ret												23
27	(Australia) Mitchell Norris	Kawasaki	27	19	Ret	17	DNS	21	23	25	Ret	16	Ret	DNS	19	20	14	22	Ret	21
28	(New Zealand) James Scott	Yamaha												17	14	Ret	17	Ret	18	18
29	(Australia) Myles Gilmore	KTM																11	16	15
30	(Australia) George Knight	Gas Gas	26	17	19	20	22	22				14	Ret							14
31	(Australia) Chandler Burns	Honda	21	11																10
32	(Australia) Connar Adams	KTM	31	24	25	23	27	26	25	29	Ret	Ret	18	22	Ret	25	26	20	21	4
33	(Australia) Zane Mackintosh	Kawasaki	35	Ret	29	27	33	29	27	31	24	20	19	24	23	24	27	23	23	3
34	(Australia) Luke Heaphy	KTM														22	23	19	22	2
35	(Australia) Jack Kitchen	Honda																21	19	2
36	(Australia) Aiden Bloom	Yamaha	33	29	28	28			29	27	25	21	20							1
	(Australia) John Bova	KTM							22	22	21									0
	(Australia) Charli Cannon	Honda			23	24	26	24	24	26	23					21	22			0
	(Australia) John Eckel	KTM										22	21							0
	(Australia) Bryce Rodney	Husqvarna												21	22					0
	(Australia) Wade Thompson	Honda	30	25	24	21														0
	(Australia) Luke Miles	Gas Gas										Ret	22	23	25					0
	(Australia) Thomas Gadsden	Kawasaki			33	31	35	33				23	23							0
	(Australia) Bradley Baling	Honda										25	24							0
	(Australia) Steel Adams	Yamaha	34	32	34	Ret	34	35	30	32	Ret	24	DNS	27	28	27	Ret			0
	(Australia) Seth Jackson	Husqvarna	29	26	27	25	30	27												0
	(Australia) Seton Broomhall	Yamaha					25	34												0
	(Australia) Emma Milesevic	Honda					31	28	26	28	Ret					26	28			0
	(Australia) Tyler Webber	KTM												26	26	29	29			0
	(Australia) Riley Pitman	Gas Gas			31	26	Ret	31												0
	(Australia) Zackariah Wright	Yamaha			26	Ret														0
	(Australia) Gordon Adrian	Yamaha												28	27					0
	(Australia) Samuel Armstrong	KTM	DNS	30	32	30	32	32	28	30	Ret									0
	(Australia) Tyler Egan	KTM														28	30	DNS	DNS	0
	(Australia) Brock Hutchins	Husqvarna					28	Ret												0
	(Australia) Cody Rickit	Yamaha	36	Ret	30	29	Ret	DNS	31	DNS	DNS									0
	(Australia) Macwilliam Walker	Yamaha	32	31										Ret	DNS					0
	(Australia) Ryan Kohlenberg	Yamaha	37	33																0
	(Australia) Liam Andrews	Gas Gas							Ret	Ret	Ret									0
	(Australia) Liam Atkinson	KTM	Ret	DNS																0
Pos	Rider	Bike	WON (Victoria (state))		HOR (Victoria (state))		GIL (South Australia)		MAI (New South Wales)			MUR (South Australia)		TOO (Queensland)		GYM (Queensland)		QLD (Queensland)		Points
