= 2026 ProMX Championship =

Australian Motocross Championship in 2026

The 2026 ProMX Motocross Championship season (known for sponsorship reasons as the Penrite ProMX Motocross Championship presented by AMX Superstores), was the sixth Australian Motocross Championship season under the ProMX moniker.

The series included eight rounds across four different states and the Australian Capital Territory. All events except the first round and the final round were a one-day format.

Kyle Webster went into the season as the defending champion in the MX1 class, after winning his third senior national title in the previous season. Ultimately, Jed Beaton would win five of the eight overall rounds contested and win his first MX1 national title. The championship victory came ten years after Beaton won the MX2 title, his only other senior national title to date.

New Zealand's Brodie Connolly won his second ProMX title in a row in 2025 but did not defend his title due to moving to compete in America. Alex Larwood succeeded Connolly as the MX2 champion, taking five overall wins on his way to his first senior national title.

== Race calendar and results ==
=== MX1 ===
Round	Date	Location	Race 1 Winner	Race 2 Winner	Round Winner
1	21–22 March	(Victoria (state)) Wonthaggi	(Australia) Jed Beaton	(Australia) Jed Beaton	(Australia) Jed Beaton
2	19 April	(Australian Capital Territory) Canberra	(Australia) Jed Beaton	(Australia) Jed Beaton	(Australia) Jed Beaton
3	10 May	(South Australia) Gillman	(Australia) Kyle Webster	(Australia) Jed Beaton	(Australia) Kyle Webster
4	24 May	(Queensland) Toowoomba	(Australia) Jed Beaton	(Australia) Jed Beaton	(Australia) Jed Beaton
5	14 June	(New South Wales) Appin	(Australia) Jed Beaton	(Australia) Jed Beaton	(Australia) Jed Beaton
6	12 July	(Victoria (state)) Traralgon	(Australia) Jed Beaton	(Australia) Jed Beaton	(Australia) Jed Beaton
7	26 July	(Queensland) Conondale	(Australia) Nathan Crawford	(Australia) Kyle Webster	(Australia) Aaron Tanti
8	1–2 August	(Queensland) QLD Moto Park	(Australia) Nathan Crawford	(Australia) Aaron Tanti	(Australia) Aaron Tanti

=== MX2 ===
Round	Date	Location	Race 1 Winner	Race 2 Winner	Round Winner
1	21–22 March	(Victoria (state)) Wonthaggi	(Australia) Alex Larwood	(Australia) Alex Larwood	(Australia) Alex Larwood
2	19 April	(Australian Capital Territory) Canberra	(Australia) Kayd Kingsford	(Australia) Alex Larwood	(Australia) Kayd Kingsford
3	10 May	(South Australia) Gillman	(Australia) Alex Larwood	(Australia) Alex Larwood	(Australia) Alex Larwood
4	24 May	(Queensland) Toowoomba	(Australia) Alex Larwood	(Australia) Noah Ferguson	(Australia) Kayd Kingsford
5	14 June	(New South Wales) Appin	(Australia) Noah Ferguson	(Australia) Alex Larwood	(Australia) Alex Larwood
6	12 July	(Victoria (state)) Traralgon	(Australia) Alex Larwood	(Australia) Alex Larwood	(Australia) Alex Larwood
7	26 July	(Queensland) Conondale	(Australia) Kayd Kingsford	(Australia) Alex Larwood	(Australia) Alex Larwood
8	1–2 August	(Queensland) QLD Moto Park	(Australia) Kayd Kingsford	(Australia) Kayd Kingsford	(Australia) Kayd Kingsford

=== Circuit locations ===
2026 ProMX Championship locations

== MX1 ==
=== Participants ===
Team	Constructor	No	Rider	Rounds
Honda Racing Australia	Honda	1	(Australia) Kyle Webster	All
Honda Racing Australia	Honda	2	(Australia) Wilson Todd	1–4
Honda Racing Australia	Honda	3	(Australia) Nathan Crawford	6–8
KTM Factory Racing Team	KTM	3	(Australia) Nathan Crawford	1
KTM Factory Racing Team	KTM	8	(Australia) Zachary Watson	All
Moto Coach Elite Racing	Honda	3	(Australia) Nathan Crawford	2–5
Moto Coach Elite Racing	Honda	22	(Australia) Rhys Budd	4–8
Moto Coach Elite Racing	Honda	28	(Australia) Cooper Holroyd	1–4
Ducati Australia/Worthington Motorcycles	Ducati	7	(Australia) Hixson McInnes	1–2
CDR Yamaha Monster Energy	Yamaha	9	(Australia) Aaron Tanti	All
CDR Yamaha Monster Energy	Yamaha	14	(Australia) Jed Beaton	All
BerrySweet Yamaha	Yamaha	11	(Australia) Sonny Pellicano	1–3, 5–8
BerrySweet Yamaha	Yamaha	72	(Australia) Regan Duffy	All
Folbigg Pools/Goodline Trim/Sphere Home Loans	Yamaha	16	(Australia) Luke Zielinski	All
Stark Future	Stark	20	(Australia) Jesse Bishop	2, 4, 7
Banks Race Development	Honda	20	(Australia) Riley Pitman	3
Banks Race Development	Stark	20	(Australia) Riley Pitman	6
Motocoach Elite Racing	Honda	23	(Australia) Brandon Steel	All
Pro Honda Racing	Honda	25	(Australia) Liam Jackson	1–4, 6
Pro Honda Racing	Honda	42	(Australia) Jet Alsop	8
WBR/Alltech Suspension	Yamaha	27	(Australia) Jack Kenney	All
Berry Sweet/SAS Site Welding/Bonita Stone	Honda	29	(Australia) Navrin Grothues	All
Next Generation Electrix	Yamaha	30	(Australia) Addison Treeby	5–8
	KTM	31	(Australia) James Davison	2
Caloundra Engine Centre	Yamaha	31	(Australia) Joel Phillips	4, 7
Team Green Kawasaki	Kawasaki	32	(Australia) Joel Cigliano	All
Caloundra Motorcycle Centre	Yamaha	34	(Australia) Levi Rogers	3–8
Bulk Nutrients Echuca Yamaha	Yamaha	38	(Australia) Bryce Ognenis	1–3
Brisbane Motorcycles/J&M Orchard Carpentry	Yamaha	40	(Australia) Kye Orchard	1–5, 7–8
Team Nami/Citycoast Motorcycles	Yamaha	42	(Australia) Brock Ninness	5
	Yamaha	44	(Australia) Jai Constantinou	7–8
Hostile/MRU/Penrite/AMA Maintainence	KTM	45	(Australia) Koby Tate	6–7
Raceline Husqvarna TDUB Racing Team	Husqvarna	47	(Australia) Todd Waters	All
Beta Australia	Beta	49	(Australia) Cody O'Loan	1–3
SFC Racing	Yamaha	49	(Australia) Cody O'Loan	4, 7–8
Fly Racing/HGS/Kyrox	Yamaha	50	(Australia) Jason West	2–3, 7–8
Cycleworld/Scotts Motorycles	Husqvarna	51	(Australia) Harry Barber	6–8
Appin MX/Lusty/Holeshot	Stark	52	(Australia) Jyle Campbell	2, 5
Haig & Menzel/BKC Complete Living	KTM	53	(Australia) Noah Rochow	1–3, 6
Brent Scammell Honda Race Team	Honda	55	(New Zealand) Jack Symon	7–8
Honda Genuine Ride Red	Honda	56	(Australia) Riley Stephens	1–2, 4–5, 7–8
DJM Racing	Yamaha	62	(Australia) Dylan McNabb	2–3
Penrite Racing Empire Kawasaki	Kawasaki	63	(Australia) Ryan Alexanderson	5–8
Penrite Racing Empire Kawasaki	Kawasaki	100	(Australia) Brad West	1–3, 5, 7–8
Penrite Racing Empire Kawasaki	Kawasaki	111	(Australia) Dean Ferris	1–4
TDub/Lochie Latimer Motocross Coaching	Yamaha	69	(Australia) Lochie Latimer	7
Winner Motorcycles/Fastline Suspension	Yamaha	71	(Australia) Seth Jackson	1–3, 5–8
BLS Suspension/WBR Motorcycles	Yamaha	79	(Australia) Jacob Sweet	1–5
Doctors Property Serv./DS Retaining	KTM	80	(Australia) Jordan Doctor	3
Kawasaki Australia/MX Store/SKDA	Kawasaki	82	(Australia) Elijah Wiese	2
Yamaha Pitmans/Banks Race Development	Yamaha	84	(Australia) Siegah Ward	All
Peter Kittle Honda Racing	Honda	87	(Australia) Sam Pretsherer	6–8
Hostile/MRU/Penrite/AMA Maintenance	Yamaha	97	(Australia) Beau Tate	1
Alltech Suspension/Allwest Motorcycles	Husqvarna	99	(Australia) Patrick Martin	1
Brisbane Motorcycles	Yamaha	142	(Australia) James Beston	7–8
Bob Medson Refrigeration	Kawasaki	155	(Australia) Nicholas Medson	1–5
	KTM	185	(Australia) Ryley Fitzpatrick	All
Matterhorn Refrigeration/Moto 365	Husqvarna	196	(Australia) Wilson Greiner-Daish	7–8
Stark Future/Troy Lee Designs	Stark	199	(Australia) John Prutti	2
Readman Civil/New Image Landscape	KTM	202	(Australia) Connor Rossandich	All
Moto Coach Elite Racing	Honda	217	(Australia) Jayden Dick	3–8
	Yamaha	232	(Australia) Joel Milesevic	8
Get Goin Automotive	KTM	264	(Australia) Riley Possingham	All
City MX/Go Karts Go/AttBuilt	Yamaha	273	(Australia) Cody Atteridge	3
Hostile Handwear/JSL Tracks/Yamaha Australia	Yamaha	275	(Australia) Travis Olander	1
Azra Solutions/Lloydys Plastering	Yamaha	377	(Australia) Patrick Lloyd	6
Juli Burns Photography/Signarama	Yamaha	388	(Australia) Lachlan Sands	1–2
Big Dog Builds/Newcastle Powersports	KTM	415	(Australia) Cody Schat	4, 7–8
	Yamaha	453	(Australia) Danny Harris	7
Favirot Flimz/Tat Motorcycles/Dialled Concepts	Yamaha	548	(Australia) Connor Trewren	1
Fist/Forth/Maxxis/Motorex/Hyundai Powerparts	Yamaha	559	(Australia) Damon Erbacher	2, 4–8
	Yamaha	737	(Australia) Ben McNevin	4, 7–8
AWT Forest Management	KTM	741	(Australia) Alex Williams	7–8
Sheroz Earthworks/Driftcon	KTM	783	(Australia) Tomas Kruger	7

=== Riders Championship ===
Points are awarded to finishers of the main races, in the following format:

Position	1st	2nd	3rd	4th	5th	6th	7th	8th	9th	10th	11th	12th	13th	14th	15th	16th	17th	18th	19th	20th
Points	25	22	20	18	16	15	14	13	12	11	10	9	8	7	6	5	4	3	2	1

Pos	Rider	Bike	WON (Victoria (state))		CAN (Australian Capital Territory)		GIL (South Australia)		TOO (Queensland)		APP (New South Wales)		TRA (Victoria (state))		CON (Queensland)		QLD (Queensland)		Points
1	(Australia) Jed Beaton	Yamaha	1	1	1	1	3	1	1	1	1	1	1	1	3	3	4	3	373
2	(Australia) Aaron Tanti	Yamaha	4	7	3	3	4	5	2	4	2	2	3	3	2	2	2	1	321
3	(Australia) Kyle Webster	Honda	3	2	2	2	1	2	Ret	2	4	4	2	4	4	1	3	4	312
4	(Australia) Nathan Crawford	KTM	9	18															279
4	(Australia) Nathan Crawford	Honda			4	Ret	5	3	3	3	3	3	4	2	1	4	1	2	279
5	(Australia) Todd Waters	Husqvarna	5	4	7	5	10	8	4	5	6	9	10	10	6	8	24	10	210
6	(Australia) Zachary Watson	KTM	10	5	6	8	7	9	5	6	5	7	DNS	DNS	9	7	6	8	196
7	(Australia) Luke Zielinski	Yamaha	6	8	11	6	11	12	6	8	10	10	12	9	10	9	9	9	190
8	(Australia) Levi Rogers	Yamaha					9	10	13	10	9	8	9	5	7	13	7	11	141
9	(Australia) Rhys Budd	Honda							7	7	8	5	5	7	8	6	12	6	139
10	(Australia) Ryley Fitzpatrick	KTM	11	10	Ret	9	16	17	12	11	13	13	11	13	12	11	10	12	134
11	(Australia) Wilson Todd	Honda	7	6	5	4	2	4	8	9									128
12	(Australia) Ryan Alexanderson	Kawasaki									7	6	6	6	5	5	5	5	123
13	(Australia) Regan Duffy	Yamaha	16	17	16	16	6	7	11	13	Ret	11	7	16	16	14	14	18	117
14	(Australia) Dean Ferris	Kawasaki	2	3	8	10	Ret	6	Ret	DNS									81
15	(Australia) Connor Rossandich	KTM	12	20	10	14	13	16	10	19	12	12	15	Ret	DNS	DNS	21	26	78
16	(Australia) Sam Pretscherer	Honda											8	8	11	10	8	7	74
17	(Australia) Jacob Sweet	Yamaha	18	12	17	7	14	13	9	12	14	Ret							73
18	(Australia) Liam Jackson	Honda	8	13	9	17	8	11	Ret	DNS			Ret	DNS					60
19	(Australia) Jack Kenney	Yamaha	19	19	19	18	Ret	18	26	17	19	15	14	11	17	21	16	16	55
20	(Australia) Brad West	Kawasaki	29	15	13	12	Ret	14			11	14			Ret	Ret	18	DNS	50
21	(Australia) Cody O'Loan	Beta	17	14	14	13	Ret	19											48
21	(Australia) Cody O'Loan	Yamaha							14	14					23	15	DNS	DNS	48
22	(Australia) Damon Erbacher	Yamaha			23	25			15	20	18	25	16	14	14	16	15	14	47
23	(Australia) Siegah Ward	Yamaha	15	16	20	21	DSQ	15	23	15	17	18	Ret	19	18	22	20	15	43
24	(Australia) Sonny Pellicano	Yamaha	23	21	22	24	12	Ret			16	23	13	12	19	19	23	17	39
25	(New Zealand) Jack Symon	Honda													13	12	17	13	29
26	(Australia) Cooper Holroyd	Honda	14	11	34	15	Ret	DNS	Ret	DNS									23
27	(Australia) Bryce Ognenis	Yamaha	25	DNS	15	11	15	Ret											22
28	(Australia) Travis Olander	Yamaha	13	9															20
29	(Australia) Jyle Campbell	Stark			12	31					15	17							19
30	(Australia) Brandon Steel	Honda	26	24	25	22	18	22	21	22	20	16	20	18	28	29	28	34	13
31	(Australia) Nicholas Medson	Kawasaki	21	23	18	20	17	21	18	Ret	27	19							13
32	(Australia) Jet Alsop	Honda															11	19	12
33	(Australia) Jai Constantinou	Yamaha													36	17	13	21	12
34	(Australia) Joel Phillips	Yamaha							17	16					Ret	25			9
35	(Australia) Seth Jackson	Yamaha	30	25	28	30	23	25			25	28	19	15	34	30	35	28	8
36	(Australia) Wilson Greiner-Daish	Husqvarna													15	Ret	19	23	8
37	(Australia) Cody Schat	KTM							16	18					27	DNS	25	27	8
38	(Australia) Noah Rochow	KTM	27	26	32	33	19	26					18	20					6
39	(Australia) Joel Cigliano	Kawasaki	Ret	22	26	27	22	27	20	25	23	22	21	17	30	33	29	29	5
40	(Australia) Kye Orchard	Yamaha	24	Ret	21	26	25	28	19	21	22	20			24	20	26	20	5
41	(Australia) Koby Tate	KTM											17	22	21	Ret			4
42	(Australia) Jason West	Yamaha			27	19	21	20							20	23	DNS	DNS	4
43	(Australia) Lochie Latimer	Yamaha													DNS	18			3
44	(Australia) Patrick Martin	Husqvarna	20	Ret															1
45	(Australia) Riley Pitman	Honda					20	24											1
45	(Australia) Riley Pitman	Stark											28	26					1
	(Australia) Riley Stephens	Honda	22	Ret	Ret	28			24	26	24	21			26	28	27	Ret	0
	(Australia) Jayden Dick	Honda					26	30	27	27	Ret	29	22	21	DNQ	DNQ	31	30	0
	(Australia) Brock Ninness	Yamaha									21	26							0
	(Australia) Jesse Bishop	Stark			24	23			22	23					22	24			0
	(Australia) Joel Milesvic	Yamaha															22	22	0
	(Australia) Navrin Grothues	Honda	28	27	30	32	24	23	25	24	26	DNS	23	23	29	27	32	25	0
	(Australia) Harry Barber	Husqvarna											24	24	32	32	DNS	DNS	0
	(Australia) Alex Williams	KTM													25	26	30	24	0
	(Australia) Addison Treeby	Yamaha									28	24	25	Ret	33	31	Ret	DNS	0
	(Australia) Patrick Lloyd	Yamaha											26	25					0
	(Australia) Riley Possingham	KTM	33	29	35	37	27	29	29	29	29	27	27	27	DNQ	DNQ	33	32	0
	(Australia) Ben McNevin	Yamaha							28	28					Ret	DNS	34	33	0
	(Australia) Lachlan Sands	Yamaha	31	28	29	36													0
	(Australia) Jordan Doctor	KTM					28	32											0
	(Australia) Cody Atteridge	Yamaha					29	31											0
	(Australia) John Prutti	Stark			31	29													0
	(Australia) Connor Trewren	Yamaha	34	30															0
	(Australia) James Beston	Yamaha													31	Ret	Ret	31	0
	(Australia) Beau Tate	Yamaha	32	DNS															0
	(Australia) James Davison	KTM			33	35													0
	(Australia) Danny Harris	Yamaha													35	34			0
	(Australia) Elijah Wiese	Kawasaki			Ret	34													0
	(Australia) Hixson McInnes	Ducati	Ret	DNS	Ret	DNS													0
	(Australia) Dylan McNabb	Yamaha			DNS	DNS	DNS	DNS											0
	(Australia) Tomas Kruger	KTM													DNQ	DNQ			0
Pos	Rider	Bike	WON (Victoria (state))		CAN (Australian Capital Territory)		GIL (South Australia)		TOO (Queensland)		APP (New South Wales)		TRA (Victoria (state))		CON (Queensland)		QLD (Queensland)		Points

== MX2 ==
=== Participants ===
Team	Constructor	No	Rider	Rounds
Raceline Husqvarna TDUB Racing Team	Husqvarna	4	(Australia) Jake Rumens	1, 4–8
Raceline Husqvarna TDUB Racing Team	Husqvarna	86	(Australia) Reid Taylor	1–4
	Honda	86	(Australia) Reid Taylor	5, 7–8
Honda Racing Australia	Honda	5	(Australia) Alex Larwood	All
Honda Racing Australia	Honda	20	(Australia) Kayd Kingsford	All
Honda Racing Australia	Honda	21	(Australia) Ryder Kingsford	All
KTM Australia	KTM	6	(Australia) Byron Dennis	All
KTM Australia	KTM	53	(New Zealand) Dylan Walsh	All
JPM 360 Kawasaki	Kawasaki	7	(Australia) Jayce Cosford	All
JPM 360 Kawasaki	Kawasaki	62	(Australia) Ryan Alexanderson	1–4
JPM 360 Kawasaki	Kawasaki	68	(Australia) Deegan Rose	1–4
JPM 360 Kawasaki	Kawasaki	318	(New Zealand) Madoc Dixon	5–8
Kawasaki Motors Australia	Kawasaki	318	(New Zealand) Madoc Dixon	1–4
Caloundra Motorcycles/Serco Motorsports	Yamaha	8	(Australia) Cambell Williams	7–8
Gas Gas Australis/JR Factory Services	Gas Gas	10	(Australia) Ky Woods	6
MTA Turbochargers	Yamaha	11	(Australia) Jack Kitchen	7–8
Mandurah City KTM	KTM	13	(Australia) Deacon Paice	1–2
Monster Energy WBR Yamaha	Yamaha	18	(Australia) Seth Burchell	All
Motocoach Elite Racing	Honda	22	(Australia) Rhys Budd	1–4
Motocoach Elite Racing	Honda	134	(Australia) Cayden Gray	All
Motocoach Elite Racing	Honda	225	(Australia) Hadley Gainfort	All
WBR Echuca/Boyds Garage	Yamaha	27	(Australia) Auston Boyd	1
Mitcham Marine/Olympic Party Hire	Honda	28	(Australia) Otto Spurling	3, 6–8
Monster Energy Yamalube Yamaha	Yamaha	29	(Australia) Noah Ferguson	All
Monster Energy Yamalube Yamaha	Yamaha	215	(Japan) Souya Nakajima	All
Yamaha Australia	Yamaha	34	(Australia) Ky Woods	1
BSMX MPE/Fox/Terraquip	Husqvarna	40	(Australia) Casey Wilmington	1–4
Alpinestars Best Build Racing	Honda	41	(New Zealand) Curtis King	5–8
Pro Honda Racing	Honda	42	(Australia) Jet Alsop	1–7
Hostile/MRU/Penrite	KTM	45	(Australia) Koby Tate	1, 4
Jab Suspension Bullet Bikes	Yamaha	46	(Australia) Thomas O'Neill	1–4, 7–8
Jab Suspension Bullet Bikes	Yamaha	267	(Australia) Benjamin O'Neill	7–8
Beatons Pro Formula/Mental4Moto	KTM	47	(Australia) Baylin Townsend	All
LCH/Fly Racing/Kyrox Hydration	Yamaha	50	(Australia) Jason West	1
Honda Motorcycles/Honda Racing Australia	Honda	61	(Australia) Charlie Rewse	1, 6–8
Holeshot Graphics/Western Motorcycles	Honda	74	(Australia) Joel Bird	2, 5
Holeshot Graphics/Western Motorcycles	Honda	411	(Australia) Callum Bird	2
00 Elite Rider Training	KTM	92	(Australia) Heath Groundwater	4–5, 7–8
Yamaha Australia/MXRP/321 Motorsports	Yamaha	94	(Australia) Koby Hantis	1–3
Turello Concreting	KTM	101	(Australia) Izaak Turello	8
Bulk Nutrients Echuca Yamaha	Yamaha	111	(Australia) Judd Chislett	1–3, 6–8
Advanced Cranes/Tommy Campers	KTM	113	(Australia) Oskar Kimber	All
	KTM	120	(Australia) Matthew Peluso	1, 6
Krooztune Suspension/Mental4Moto	Kawasaki	143	(Australia) Thomas Gadsden	3, 6
Territory Engineering/LMH Diesel	KTM	147	(Australia) Clayton Bogucki	3
	Honda	191	(Australia) Jordan Howard	1, 5–8
Prorider Powersports/TNC	Husqvarna	207	(Australia) Brock Black	5
Thor MX/Gas Imports	Honda	211	(Australia) Kayden Strode	1–2, 6
	KTM	282	(Australia) Shannon Carmichael	7–8
	KTM	284	(Australia) John Bova	2, 5
Build Tech/Maintenance Systems	Kawasaki	310	(Australia) Brock Hutchins	1–5
Jamie Fawcett	KTM	355	(Australia) Fletcher Thompson	6
Kawasaki Australia/Dunlop/Showa/D.I.D	Kawasaki	386	(Japan) Haruki Yokoyama	All
Platinum Excavation/HPN Moto	KTM	394	(Australia) Rory Clements	1–2, 4–5, 7
Whitehouse Motorcycles/OnPoint Suspension	Yamaha	415	(Australia) Samuel Armstrong	All
Husqvarna Australia/TDub Racing	Husqvarna	428	(Australia) Braden Plath	4–5, 7–8
Team XLR	Yamaha	486	(Australia) Felicity Shrimpton	2, 4
Andison Transport/Matto's Custom Resto	Yamaha	514	(Australia) Xander Paynter	2
Mareeba Yamaha	Yamaha	531	(Australia) Vinn O'Brien	8
RSM Motorcycles/Maxxis MotoAus/Team Green	Kawasaki	532	(Australia) Ryan Clark	1–3, 5
LMC Husqvarna Racing	Husqvarna	722	(New Zealand) Phoenix van Dusschoten	7–8
JJC Electrical Services	Honda	981	(Australia) Samuel Noonan	5

=== Riders Championship ===
Points are awarded to finishers of the main races, in the following format:

Position	1st	2nd	3rd	4th	5th	6th	7th	8th	9th	10th	11th	12th	13th	14th	15th	16th	17th	18th	19th	20th
Points	25	22	20	18	16	15	14	13	12	11	10	9	8	7	6	5	4	3	2	1

Pos	Rider	Bike	WON (Victoria (state))		CAN (Australian Capital Territory)		GIL (South Australia)		TOO (Queensland)		APP (New South Wales)		TRA (Victoria (state))		CON (Queensland)		QLD (Queensland)		Points
1	(Australia) Alex Larwood	Honda	1	1	16	1	1	1	1	12	3	1	1	1	2	1	12	2	337
2	(Australia) Kayd Kingsford	Honda	2	7	1	2	6	8	2	2	2	2	2	2	1	9	1	1	330
3	(New Zealand) Dylan Walsh	KTM	3	3	3	4	3	10	4	3	11	5	5	4	3	2	2	5	287
4	(Australia) Byron Dennis	KTM	4	2	2	5	2	3	5	6	5	6	7	3	4	6	8	9	274
5	(Australia) Ryder Kingsford	Honda	6	9	8	8	5	2	3	5	4	4	3	Ret	5	4	5	6	248
6	(Australia) Noah Ferguson	Yamaha	5	4	9	9	4	5	14	1	1	7	13	5	6	21	4	4	238
7	(Australia) Seth Burchell	Yamaha	7	12	10	14	8	9	12	9	6	12	4	7	12	12	9	11	183
8	(Japan) Haruki Yokoyama	Kawasaki	13	10	14	10	7	13	6	15	9	10	Ret	9	9	7	6	8	169
9	(Australia) Reid Taylor	Husqvarna	19	14	7	Ret	11	11	11	4									165
9	(Australia) Reid Taylor	Honda									7	3			Ret	3	3	3	165
10	(Australia) Jayce Cosford	Kawasaki	15	18	11	15	13	14	7	13	15	8	8	8	7	5	7	7	165
11	(New Zealand) Madoc Dixon	Kawasaki	9	11	4	13	10	6	Ret	14	10	13	9	11	11	8	11	12	164
12	(Japan) Souya Nakajima	Yamaha	16	15	15	12	15	4	13	8	12	11	10	10	8	10	10	10	158
13	(Australia) Jet Alsop	Honda	10	13	6	11	Ret	DNS	8	10	8	9	6	6	13	19			133
14	(Australia) Ryan Alexanderson	Kawasaki	17	5	5	3	9	7	9	7									108
15	(Australia) Rhys Budd	Honda	11	6	12	7	12	12	10	11									87
16	(Australia) Baylin Townsend	KTM	14	16	18	17	17	20	17	17	Ret	18	11	13	15	14	15	15	78
17	(Australia) Koby Hantis	Yamaha	8	8	13	6	DNS	DNS											49
18	(Australia) Oskar Kimber	KTM	24	24	22	21	19	17	21	22	16	15	15	14	18	15	18	18	45
19	(Australia) Cambell Williams	Yamaha													10	11	13	13	37
20	(New Zealand) Curtis King	Honda									14	16	16	15	16	25	17	19	34
21	(New Zealand) Phoenix van Dusschoten	Husqvarna													14	13	14	14	29
22	(Australia) Jake Rumens	Husqvarna	18	Ret					24	Ret	21	20	14	16	21	20	16	17	26
23	(Australia) Casey Wilmington	Husqvarna	23	22	19	19	14	15	16	19									24
24	(Australia) Kayden Strode	Honda	22	17	DNS	DNS							12	12					22
25	(Australia) Deegan Rose	Kawasaki	Ret	20	Ret	22	16	16	15	16									22
26	(Australia) Braden Plath	Husqvarna							18	18	Ret	17			17	16	20	DNS	20
27	(Australia) Deacon Paice	KTM	12	Ret	17	16													18
28	(Australia) John Bova	KTM			24	18					13	14							18
29	(Australia) Thomas O'Neill	Yamaha	21	23	20	20	18	18	19	20					20	18	Ret	DNS	15
30	(Australia) Heath Groundwater	KTM							20	21	Ret	Ret			22	17	21	16	10
31	(Australia) Judd Chislett	Yamaha	25	21	23	23	21	19					19	17	24	24	23	22	8
32	(Australia) Koby Tate	KTM	20	19							18	19							8
33	(Australia) Matthew Peluso	KTM	27	28									17	18					7
34	(Australia) Brock Hutchins	Kawasaki	26	25	25	27	20	23	22	23	17	21							5
35	(Australia) Cayden Gray	Honda	32	27	29	25	23	21	25	25	20	23	18	Ret	32	28	26	23	4
36	(Australia) Jack Kitchen	Yamaha													19	22	19	29	4
37	(Australia) Fletcher Thompson	KTM											20	19					3
38	(Australia) Samuel Armstrong	Yamaha	31	26	Ret	Ret	22	Ret	27	26	19	Ret	22	Ret	30	30	30	25	2
39	(Australia) Shannon Carmichael	KTM													28	23	25	20	1
40	(Australia) Charlie Rewse	Honda	Ret	32									21	20	25	Ret	22	DNS	1
	(Australia) Ryan Clark	Kawasaki	30	30	21	24	24	25			DNS	22							0
	(Australia) Jordan Howard	Honda	34	DNS							Ret	26	24	21	29	29	32	27	0
	(Australia) Izaak Turello	KTM															24	21	0
	(Australia) Hadley Gainfort	Honda	33	31	30	30	26	Ret	Ret	Ret	Ret	25	25	22	31	31	31	28	0
	(Australia) Clayton Bogucki	KTM					27	22											0
	(Australia) Samuel Noonan	Honda									22	Ret							0
	(Australia) Rory Clements	KTM	29	29	26	26			23	24	Ret	24			23	Ret			0
	(Australia) Thomas Gadsen	Kawasaki					Ret	26					23	23					0
	(Australia) Otto Spurling	Honda					25	24					26	Ret	27	27	28	Ret	0
	(Australia) Benjamin O'Neill	Yamaha													26	26	27	24	0
	(Australia) Felicity Shrimpton	Yamaha			31	31			26	27									0
	(Australia) Vinn O'Brien	Yamaha															29	26	0
	(Australia) Joel Bird	Honda			27	Ret					Ret	DNS							0
	(Australia) Callum Bird	Honda			28	28													0
	(Australia) Auston Boyd	Yamaha	28	Ret															0
	(Australia) Xander Paynter	Yamaha			32	29													0
	(Australia) Brock Black	Husqvarna									Ret	Ret							0
	(Australia) Jason West	Yamaha	Ret	DNS															0
	(Australia) Ky Woods	Yamaha	DNS	DNS															0
	(Australia) Ky Woods	Gas Gas											Ret	DNS					0
Pos	Rider	Bike	WON (Victoria (state))		CAN (Australian Capital Territory)		GIL (South Australia)		TOO (Queensland)		APP (New South Wales)		TRA (Victoria (state))		CON (Queensland)		QLD (Queensland)		Points
