= 2023 ProMX Championship =

Australian Motocross Competition in 2023

The 2023 ProMX Motocross Championship season (known for sponsorship reasons as the Penrite ProMX Motocross Championship), was the third Australian Motocross Championship season under the ProMX moniker.

The series included eight rounds across four different states. All events except the fourth round and the final round were a one-day format.

Aaron Tanti was the reigning champion in the MX1 class, after winning his maiden title in 2022. Ultimately, Tanti was not able to defend his title, which was won instead by veteran Dean Ferris. This was Ferris' fourth MX1 title and one he picked up after coming out of retirement in the lead up to the start of the season.

In the MX2 class, Wilson Todd was the defending champion, after he won his third class title in the previous season. Todd was able to once again successfully defend his title, after a season long battle with Nathan Crawford.

The start of the season was marred by the fatal crash of Brayden Erbacher at the opening round. The remaining races at Wonthaggi were cancelled as a result.

== Race calendar and results ==
=== MX1 ===
Round	Date	Location	Race 1 Winner	Race 2 Winner	Race 3 Winner	Round Winner
1	5 March	(Victoria (state)) Wonthaggi	Event Cancelled			
2	19 March	(New South Wales) Appin	(Australia) Dean Ferris	(Australia) Aaron Tanti	-	(Australia) Aaron Tanti
3	16 April	(Victoria (state)) Wodonga	(Australia) Jed Beaton	(Australia) Dean Ferris	-	(Australia) Jed Beaton
4	6-7 May	(New South Wales) Maitland	(Australia) Dean Ferris	(Australia) Dean Ferris	(Australia) Dean Ferris	(Australia) Dean Ferris
5	28 May	(South Australia) Gillman	(Australia) Kyle Webster	(Australia) Kyle Webster	-	(Australia) Kyle Webster
6	25 June	(Queensland) Toowoomba	(Australia) Dean Ferris	(Australia) Dean Ferris	-	(Australia) Dean Ferris
7	13 August	(Queensland) QLD Moto Park	(Australia) Dean Ferris	(Australia) Dean Ferris	-	(Australia) Dean Ferris
8	19-20 August	(Queensland) Coolum	(Australia) Kyle Webster	(Australia) Kyle Webster	-	(Australia) Kyle Webster

=== MX2 ===
Round	Date	Location	Race 1 Winner	Race 2 Winner	Round Winner
1	5 March	(Victoria (state)) Wonthaggi	(Australia) Wilson Todd	Race Cancelled	No Overall
2	19 March	(New South Wales) Appin	(Australia) Nathan Crawford	(Australia) Nathan Crawford	(Australia) Nathan Crawford
3	16 April	(Victoria (state)) Wodonga	(New Zealand) Brodie Connolly	(Australia) Nathan Crawford	(New Zealand) Brodie Connolly
4	6-7 May	(New South Wales) Maitland	(Australia) Nathan Crawford	(Australia) Jesse Dobson	(Australia) Rhys Budd
5	28 May	(South Australia) Gillman	(Australia) Wilson Todd	(Australia) Wilson Todd	(Australia) Wilson Todd
6	25 June	(Queensland) Toowoomba	(Australia) Nathan Crawford	(Australia) Wilson Todd	(Australia) Nathan Crawford
7	13 August	(Queensland) QLD Moto Park	(Australia) Nathan Crawford	(Australia) Nathan Crawford	(Australia) Nathan Crawford
8	19-20 August	(Queensland) Coolum	(Australia) Wilson Todd	(Australia) Wilson Todd	(Australia) Wilson Todd

=== Circuit locations ===
2023 ProMX Championship locations

== MX1 ==
=== Participants ===
Team	Constructor	No	Rider	Rounds
Monster Energy CDR Yamaha	Yamaha	1	(Australia) Aaron Tanti	All
Monster Energy CDR Yamaha	Yamaha	4	(Australia) Luke Clout	1–6
KTM Racing Team Australia	KTM	5	(Australia) Kirk Gibbs	All
	Gas Gas	7	(Australia) Spenser Wilton	1
Moto1 Motorcycles/Honda Australia	Honda	8	(Australia) Zachary Watson	All
DK Heavy Plant	Suzuki	9	(Australia) Nathan Brochtrup	4
Dirt Bike Services/Bridgeland Motorcycles	Honda	10	(Australia) Levi McManus	1–3
WBR Bulk Nutrients Yamaha Race Team	Yamaha	11	(Australia) Bailey Malkiewicz	7–8
WBR Bulk Nutrients Yamaha Race Team	Yamaha	102	(Australia) Matt Moss	2–3
WBR Bulk Nutrients Yamaha Race Team	Yamaha	145	(New Zealand) Maximus Purvis	3–5
WBR Bulk Nutrients Yamaha Race Team	Yamaha	162	(Australia) Luke Zielinski	1
Roo Systems Racing	Yamaha	162	(Australia) Luke Zielinski	2–8
Cullys Yamaha	Yamaha	12	(Australia) John Darroch	1–5, 7–8
Cullys Yamaha	Yamaha	46	(Australia) Ayden Bridgeford	5
Boost Mobile Honda HRC	Honda	14	(Australia) Jed Beaton	All
Boost Mobile Honda HRC	Honda	96	(Australia) Kyle Webster	All
Scrivens Honda	Honda	17	(Australia) Cory Watts	All
Roo Systems	KTM	19	(Australia) Bailey Middleton	1, 7
Ballina Motorcycles Caldera Tracks & Trails	KTM	21	(Australia) Deegan Graham	7
Ace Wholesalers	Honda	22	(Australia) Jesse Bishop	1
Caloundra Motorcycle Centre	Yamaha	23	(Australia) Levi Rogers	All
Penrite GO42 KTM	KTM	24	(Australia) Brett Metcalfe	All
Quickshift Motorcycles	Yamaha	28	(Australia) Cooper Holroyd	1–2, 4
Mareeba Yamaha Race Team	Yamaha	29	(Australia) Navrin Grothues	1–2, 7–8
KTM Newcastle	Gas Gas	29	(Australia) Jye Dickson	4
Team XLR	Husqvarna	31	(Australia) Joel Phillips	3, 6–8
Mick Muldoon Motorcycles	Kawasaki	32	(Australia) Joel Cigliano	All
Pro Moto Suspension/Hunter Valley Motorsports	KTM	33	(Australia) Bryson Cherrett	4
Simpson Crash/Simpson Signs	KTM	33	(Australia) Jordan Simpson	5
Pro-Moto Suspension	KTM	36	(Australia) Travis Silk	8
Worxx Carpentry	KTM	38	(Australia) Bryce Ognenis	1–4
Brisbane Motorcycles/JSM	Kawasaki	40	(Australia) Kye Orchard	All
MX Store	Yamaha	41	(Australia) Lachlan McClelland	7
Team NAMI	KTM	42	(Australia) Brock Ninness	3–6, 8
MXRP	Gas Gas	44	(Australia) Cody Schat	All
Raceline Husqvarna Berry Sweet Racing	Husqvarna	47	(Australia) Todd Waters	1–7
Moto1 Motorcycles	KTM	49	(Australia) Cody O'Loan	All
OakesMX Development	Yamaha	50	(Australia) Braeden Krebs	7
MPE Husqvarna	Husqvarna	51	(Australia) Robbie Marshall	6–7
Held South GasLab	Husqvarna	52	(Australia) James Alen	8
Honda Genuine Red Ride	Honda	56	(Australia) Riley Stephens	All
Honda Genuine Red Ride	Honda	62	(Australia) Dylan Wood	All
Mora Mech Racing	TM	58	(Australia) Troy Mora	1, 6, 8
Cessnock Carpet Court	Yamaha	59	(Australia) Aaron Parker	4
Doctors Property Services	Kawasaki	60	(Australia) Jordan Doctor	1
	Kawasaki	61	(New Caledonia) Aymeric Lechanteur	7
City Coast Motorcycles	Yamaha	68	(Australia) Jake Cobbin	2–3, 7–8
TLR Racing	KTM	69	(Australia) Lochie Latimer	7–8
GASGAS Racing Team Australia	GASGAS	72	(Australia) Regan Duffy	All
BLS Suspension	Yamaha	79	(Australia) Jacob Sweet	8
MXStore	Honda	81	(Australia) Joel Evans	All
Fraser Motorcycles/Apro Motorsport	Gas Gas	82	(Australia) Cooper Nicholson	2, 4, 7–8
Prokits Race Division/J&B Racing	Yamaha	83	(Australia) Jack Borg	7
Ride Red Privateer Program	Honda	84	(Australia) Siegah Ward	All
Two Wheel Obsession	Yamaha	98	(Australia) Blake Waldon	3–5
	Honda	101	(Australia) Jayden Conforto	1
Berry Sweet Strawberry Farm	Honda	101	(Australia) Jayden Rykers	8
Brisbane Motorcycles Yamaha	Yamaha	111	(Australia) Dean Ferris	All
Alpine Motorcycles	Yamaha	117	(Australia) Dylan Long	1
STE Racing	KTM	118	(Australia) Callum Norton	8
Prokits	KTM	124	(Australia) Joshua Trevethan	7
Davey Motorsports KTM Racing Team	KTM	153	(New Zealand) Hamish Harwood	2–8
Brisbane Motorcycles	Yamaha	168	(Australia) Zhane Dunlop	1–4, 6–8
	Honda	174	(Australia) Sam Larsen	6–8
Ride Red Honda	Honda	196	(Australia) Wilson Greiner-Daish	7–8
Carr Brothers KTM	KTM	202	(Australia) Connor Rossandich	1–2, 4–8
Bullet Bines	KTM	207	(Australia) Benny Streeter	6
Black Dog Custom	Husqvarna	208	(Australia) Riley Fucsko	7–8
Mudgee Power Sports	GASGAS	215	(Australia) Liam Jackson	All
KTM Australia/WP Newcastle	KTM	237	(Australia) Joshua Whitehead	1–2, 4–8
Gladstone Motorcycles	Yamaha	239	(Australia) Clayton Hodges	1–3
Prokits Movement Realty	GASGAS	273	(Australia) Jeremy Collins	7
Maitland Motorcycles	GASGAS	331	(Australia) Jackson Mitchell	4
Quickshift Motorcycles	Yamaha	415	(Australia) Ashley O'Meley	1–2
ProKits Australia Featherstone Motorsports	Yamaha	433	(Australia) Mitchell Brown	7
KTM Australia	KTM	440	(Australia) Jai Walker	1–5, 7–8
KJ Thomas/Hands On Kawasaki	Kawasaki	472	(Australia) Lachie Stewart	1, 3
Harrows Transport	KTM	811	(Australia) Justin Harrow	8

=== Riders Championship ===
Points are awarded to finishers of the main races, in the following format:

Position	1st	2nd	3rd	4th	5th	6th	7th	8th	9th	10th	11th	12th	13th	14th	15th	16th	17th	18th	19th	20th
Points	25	22	20	18	16	15	14	13	12	11	10	9	8	7	6	5	4	3	2	1

Pos	Rider	Bike	WON (Victoria (state))		APP (New South Wales)		WOD (Victoria (state))		MAI (New South Wales)			GIL (South Australia)		TOO (Queensland)		QLD (Queensland)		COO (Queensland)		Points
1	(Australia) Dean Ferris	Yamaha	C	C	1	3	Ret	1	1	1	1	7	9	1	1	1	1	2	2	315
2	(Australia) Jed Beaton	Honda	C	C	4	2	1	2	8	4	4	4	4	2	3	2	3	3	6	291
3	(Australia) Kirk Gibbs	KTM	C	C	2	6	5	3	4	8	6	3	6	4	4	7	4	5	3	258
4	(Australia) Aaron Tanti	Yamaha	C	C	3	1	Ret	7	3	3	3	2	2	5	2	5	Ret	4	7	249
5	(Australia) Kyle Webster	Honda	C	C	10	5	Ret	5	5	5	DNS	1	1	6	5	3	2	1	1	248
6	(New Zealand) Hamish Harwood	KTM			8	7	3	6	6	7	7	8	5	7	8	6	6	6	4	224
7	(Australia) Brett Metcalfe	KTM	C	C	6	9	7	10	7	9	8	6	8	9	9	4	5	11	5	203
8	(Australia) Luke Clout	Yamaha	C	C	9	4	15	9	2	2	2	11	3	8	6					172
9	(Australia) Todd Waters	Husqvarna	C	C	5	8	2	4	32	6	5	9	7	3	Ret	Ret	DNS			146
10	(Australia) Zachary Watson	Honda	C	C	14	13	11	12	11	12	11	12	16	10	7	8	7	13	12	146
11	(Australia) Jai Walker	KTM	C	C	15	10	4	Ret	9	10	10	10	12			9	8	8	15	133
12	(Australia) Joel Evans	Honda	C	C	11	11	14	16	10	16	15	16	13	12	10	10	13	9	13	126
13	(Australia) Luke Zielinski	Yamaha	C	C	12	14	Ret	DNS	17	13	13	15	14	11	12	12	9	10	8	113
14	(Australia) Dylan Wood	Honda	C	C	Ret	17	9	13	12	14	12	20	18	13	13	11	14	12	9	107
15	(Australia) Levi Rogers	Yamaha	C	C	13	35	18	Ret	15	11	9	14	10	19	11	DNQ	DNQ	7	Ret	83
16	(Australia) Regan Duffy	Gas Gas	C	C	24	18	10	11	14	15	14	17	11	17	15	Ret	DNS	DNS	DNS	68
17	(New Zealand) Maximus Purvis	Yamaha					6	8	Ret	DNS	DNS	5	15							50
18	(Australia) Liam Jackson	Gas Gas	C	C	18	24	8	14	26	Ret	DNS	13	21	14	20	16	25	18	22	47
19	(Australia) John Darroch	Yamaha	C	C	20	23	12	Ret	Ret	DNS	DNS	19	17			17	Ret	15	11	36
20	(Australia) Cody O'Loan	KTM	C	C	21	19	16	DNS	21	20	21	23	19	16	16	20	15	19	18	32
21	(Australia) Cory Watts	Honda	C	C	Ret	32	Ret	15	23	Ret	18	Ret	24	22	19	15	10	27	27	28
22	(Australia) Bailey Malkiewicz	Yamaha														18	12	17	14	23
23	(Australia) Zhane Dunlop	Yamaha	C	C	25	33	Ret	DNS	22	25	22			25	17	13	11	22	25	22
24	(Australia) Robbie Marshall	Husqvarna												15	14	14	22			20
25	(Australia) Bryce Ognenis	KTM	C	C	17	15	20	DNS	19	18	17									20
26	(Australia) Joshua Whitehead	KTM	C	C	32	16			18	17	24	21	22	18	18	23	20	25	23	19
27	(Australia) Jayden Rykers	Honda																14	10	18
28	(Australia) Joel Phillips	Husqvarna					17	18						20	21	24	18	20	17	16
29	(Australia) Matt Moss	Yamaha			7	20	Ret	DNS												15
30	(Australia) Cooper Holroyd	Yamaha	C	C	16	12			20	23	DNS									15
31	(Australia) Jye Dickson	Gas Gas							13	19	16									15
32	(Australia) Siegah Ward	Honda	C	C	27	30	Ret	DNS	16	24	19	18	20	23	23	22	19	DNQ	DNQ	13
33	(Australia) Joel Cigliano	Kawasaki	C	C	28	27	13	17	27	28	25	24	23	30	24	28	29	Ret	DNS	12
34	(Australia) Lochie Latimer	KTM														Ret	21	16	16	10
35	(Australia) Braeden Krebs	Yamaha														19	17			6
36	(Australia) Wilson Greiner-Daish	Honda														25	16	28	DNS	4
37	(Australia) Kye Orchard	Kawasaki	C	C	29	34	19	19	24	22	23	27	28	26	Ret	32	27	29	31	4
38	(Australia) Navrin Grothues	Yamaha	C	C	19	Ret										31	33	23	20	3
39	(Australia) Travis Silk	KTM																24	19	2
40	(Australia) Connor Rossandich	KTM	C	C	Ret	29			Ret	21	20	22	25	21	Ret	29	23	26	24	1
41	(Australia) Riley Stephens	Honda	C	C	31	25	21	20	29	29	26	25	29	28	25	34	32	35	32	1
	(Australia) Sam Larsen	Honda												29	22	27	30	21	21	0
	(Australia) Bailey Middleton	KTM	C	C												21	24			0
	(Australia) Jake Cobbin	Yamaha			26	21	DNS	DNS								30	28	30	28	0
	(Australia) Cody Schat	Gas Gas	C	C	22	26	Ret	DNS	Ret	DNS	DNS	26	26	24	DNS	26	26	Ret	26	0
	(Australia) Ashley O'Meley	Yamaha	C	C	30	22														0
	(Australia) Levi McManus	Honda	C	C	23	31	DNS	DNS												0
	(Australia) Brock Ninness	KTM					DNS	DNS	25	27	DNS	29	27	27	Ret			32	33	0
	(Australia) Jackson Mitchell	Gas Gas							28	26	29									0
	(Australia) Troy Mora	TM	C	C										31	26			31	30	0
	(Australia) Nathan Brochtrup	Suzuki							31	31	27									0
	(Australia) Benny Streeter	KTM												Ret	27					0
	(Australia) Aaron Parker	Yamaha							30	30	28									0
	(Australia) Ayden Bridgeford	Yamaha										28	30							0
	(Australia) Clayton Hodges	Yamaha	C	C	33	28	Ret	DNS												0
	(Australia) James Alen	Husqvarna																33	29	0
	(Australia) Jordan Simpson	KTM										30	31							0
	(Australia) Bryson Cherrett	KTM							33	32	30									0
	(Australia) Deegan Graham	KTM														33	31			0
	(Australia) Blake Waldon	Yamaha					DNS	DNS	Ret	34	Ret	31	Ret							0
	(Australia) Cooper Nicholson	Gas Gas			Ret	Ret			34	33	DNS					Ret	DNS	34	Ret	0
	(Australia) Lachlan McClelland	Yamaha														35	34			0
	(Australia) Callum Norton	KTM																Ret	Ret	0
	(Australia) Lachie Stewart	Kawasaki	C	C			Ret	DNS												0
	(Australia) Riley Fucsko	Husqvarna														DNQ	DNQ	Ret	DNS	0
	(Australia) Jacob Sweet	Yamaha																Ret	DNS	0
	(Australia) Jeremy Collins	Gas Gas														DNS	DNS			0
	(Australia) Dylan Long	Yamaha	C	C																0
	(Australia) Jesse Bishop	Honda	C	C																0
	(Australia) Jayden Conforto	Honda	C	C																0
	(Australia) Jordan Doctor	Kawasaki	C	C																0
	(Australia) Spenser Wilton	Gas Gas	C	C																0
	(Australia) Jack Borg	Yamaha														DNQ	DNQ			0
	(New Caledonia) Aymeric Lechanteur	Kawasaki														DNQ	DNQ			0
	(Australia) Mitchell Brown	Yamaha														DNQ	DNQ			0
	(Australia) Joshua Trevethan	KTM														DNQ	DNQ			0
	(Australia) Justin Harrow	KTM																DNQ	DNQ	0
Pos	Rider	Bike	WON (Victoria (state))		APP (New South Wales)		WOD (Victoria (state))		MAI (New South Wales)			GIL (South Australia)		TOO (Queensland)		QLD (Queensland)		COO (Queensland)		Points

== MX2 ==
=== Participants ===
Team	Constructor	No	Rider	Rounds
Team Honda HRC Racing	Honda	1	(Australia) Wilson Todd	All
Team Honda HRC Racing	Honda	84	(Australia) Emma Milesevic	3
Team Honda HRC Racing	Honda	88	(New Zealand) Brodie Connolly	All
Yamalube Yamaha Racing	Yamaha	5	(Australia) Alex Larwood	1–3
Yamalube Yamaha Racing	Yamaha	7	(Australia) Charli Cannon	6
Yamalube Yamaha Racing	Yamaha	16	(Australia) Kaleb Barham	5–8
Yamalube Yamaha Racing	Yamaha	754	(Australia) Jayce Cosford	1–4, 7–8
Hunter Valley Steel	Kawasaki	10	(Australia) Harrison Foster	All
Brianna Tilt Trays	Yamaha	12	(Australia) Seton Broomhall	1–5, 7–8
Serco Yamaha	Yamaha	14	(Australia) Jesse Dobson	1–5
Serco Yamaha	Yamaha	22	(Australia) Rhys Budd	All
Serco Yamaha	Yamaha	110	(Australia) Luke Reardon	7
Beard Brothers Motorcycles	KTM	15	(Australia) Seth Hardman	1–2, 4
Husqvarna Australia/MPE Suspension	Husqvarna	16	(Australia) Kaleb Barham	1–4
	Yamaha	17	(Australia) Jarrod Whitney	2–4
Moto1 Motorcycles Racing Team	KTM	18	(Australia) Myles Gilmore	1–5
Moto1 Motorcycles Racing Team	KTM	27	(Australia) Liam Atkinson	All
Moto1 Motorcycles Racing Team	KTM	62	(Australia) Ryan Alexanderson	All
Whinner Motorcycles	KTM	19	(Australia) Connar Adams	1–2
WBR Bulk Nutrients Yamaha Race Team	Yamaha	21	(Australia) Ryder Kingsford	1–2, 7–8
WBR Bulk Nutrients Yamaha Race Team	Yamaha	102	(Australia) Matt Moss	4
Spectro Elliott Bros Racing	Honda	23	(Australia) George Knight	All
Spectro Elliott Bros Racing	Honda	32	(Australia) Liam Andrews	All
Spectro Elliott Bros Racing	Honda	38	(Australia) Thynan Kean	1–4, 7–8
	Honda	24	(Australia) Chandler Burns	All
Raceline Husqvarna Berry Sweet Racing	Husqvarna	25	(Australia) Blake Fox	All
Gas Gas Racing Team	Gas Gas	29	(Australia) Noah Ferguson	All
Agculture Nutrients	Yamaha	33	(Australia) Jack McLean	1–2, 5, 7–8
Power Sports Kawasaki	Kawasaki	36	(Australia) Zane Mackintosh	All
Elliott Brothers	Honda	37	(Australia) Zachary Joy	1–2
North Star Pastoral KTM	KTM	41	(New Zealand) Curtis King	1–2, 4–6
Brisbane Motorcycles	Yamaha	42	(Australia) James Beston	6–8
Elliott Brothers Bendigo	Honda	43	(Australia) Mackenzie O'Bree	All
Davey Motorsports KTM Racing Team	KTM	46	(Australia) Hugh McKay	1–4
Davey Motorsports KTM Racing Team	KTM	55	(New Zealand) Hayden Smith	3–5
Tonon Plumbing & Gas	KTM	48	(Australia) Deegan Mancinelli	7–8
	Gas Gas	49	(Australia) Caleb Goullet	5
OatesMX Development	Yamaha	50	(Australia) Braeden Krebs	1–6
Trooper Lu's	Yamaha	52	(Australia) Jyle Campbell	2
CML KTM Racing	KTM	55	(New Zealand) Madoc Dixon	7–8
Roo Systems	Yamaha	59	(Australia) Brayden Erbacher	1
Rising Motorsports	Gas Gas	60	(Australia) Brock Flynn	All
Rising Motorsports	Gas Gas	86	(Australia) Reid Taylor	2, 4–5, 7–8
Rising Motorsports	Gas Gas	427	(Australia) Tye Jones	1
	Honda	65	(Australia) Connor Whitney	2–4
KTM Racing Team	KTM	66	(Australia) Kayden Minear	All
KTM Racing Team	KTM	199	(Australia) Nathan Crawford	All
Savage Motorcycles	KTM	68	(Australia) Isaac Atkins	5
Honda Australia	Honda	70	(Australia) Ben Novak	All
Team Moto Yamaha Frankston	Yamaha	73	(Australia) Benjamin McAliece	1
	Honda	74	(Australia) Bradley Baling	3–4
Riders Market/Brisbane Motorcycles	Husqvarna	75	(Australia) Jack Kukas	1–2, 6–8
BLS Suspension	Yamaha	79	(Australia) Jacob Sweet	All
Little Jays Jersey Prints	Husqvarna	81	(Australia) Shaun Snow	5
Oates MX/Banks Race Development	Yamaha	82	(Australia) Elijah Wiese	3, 5, 7–8
Two Wheel Obsession	Yamaha	98	(Australia) Blake Waldon	6–8
Elliot Brothers MPE	Honda	101	(Australia) Jayden Conforto	3–5
Harrows Transport	KTM	111	(Australia) Justin Harrow	1–2, 4, 7
Go24 Get Outdoors	Gas Gas	118	(Australia) Mitchell Norris	5, 7–8
Empire Kawasaki	Kawasaki	121	(New Zealand) Cody Cooper	1–3
Empire Kawasaki	Kawasaki	386	(Japan) Haruki Yokoyama	All
Plant Based Power Systems	Kawasaki	122	(Australia) Ojai Maguire	6–8
Seed & Grain	Yamaha	144	(Australia) Charlie Holmes	1
	Yamaha	151	(Australia) Aiden Bloom	1, 4, 7–8
Gas Gas Australia	Gas Gas	153	(Australia) Korey McMahon	1
	Husqvarna	157	(Australia) Sam Murray	1
Picton Sand and Soil	KTM	184	(Australia) Brock Godfrey	2
Brisbane Motorcycles	KTM	185	(Australia) Ryley Fitzpatrick	All
Ride Red Honda	Honda	196	(Australia) Wilson Greiner-Daish	1–3, 5–6
Black Dog Custom	Husqvarna	208	(Australia) Riley Fucsko	1–4, 6
	Yamaha	278	(Australia) Lachlan Lee	6
Coastal Motorcycle Centre	KTM	284	(Australia) John Bova	1–5
DMK Designs/Mudgee Honda Centre	Honda	322	(Australia) Jeremy Waters	4
MTA Turbochargers	Honda	438	(Australia) Jack Kitchen	7
Tattoo Racing	Husqvarna	472	(Australia) Max Barrass	7–8
Portas Bikes & Power	Husqvarna	485	(Australia) Caleb Ward	7–8

=== Riders Championship ===
Points are awarded to finishers of the main races, in the following format:

Position	1st	2nd	3rd	4th	5th	6th	7th	8th	9th	10th	11th	12th	13th	14th	15th	16th	17th	18th	19th	20th
Points	25	22	20	18	16	15	14	13	12	11	10	9	8	7	6	5	4	3	2	1

Pos	Rider	Bike	WON (Victoria (state))		APP (New South Wales)		WOD (Victoria (state))		MAI (New South Wales)		GIL (South Australia)		TOO (Queensland)		QLD (Queensland)		COO (Queensland)		Points
1	(Australia) Wilson Todd	Honda	1	C	2	2	3	5	2	3	1	1	3	1	2	3	1	1	334
2	(Australia) Nathan Crawford	KTM	DSQ	C	1	1	Ret	1	1	5	2	2	1	2	1	1	2	3	299
3	(New Zealand) Brodie Connolly	Honda	5	C	3	5	1	3	7	12	6	3	6	4	3	2	3	6	265
4	(Australia) Rhys Budd	Yamaha	10	C	10	3	9	9	3	2	4	5	4	5	6	6	8	7	233
5	(Australia) Noah Ferguson	Gas Gas	3	C	27	DNS	15	7	6	4	3	4	2	3	4	4	5	2	227
6	(Australia) Kayden Minear	KTM	4	C	5	8	5	2	11	9	14	8	9	10	14	11	4	8	198
7	(Australia) Liam Andrews	Honda	7	C	13	7	7	11	10	8	7	7	5	9	16	10	9	Ret	168
8	(Australia) Ryan Alexanderson	KTM	16	C	8	15	Ret	12	4	6	11	9	7	6	9	12	7	9	164
9	(Australia) Kaleb Barham	Husqvarna	11	C	7	6	4	6	Ret	DNS									145
9	(Australia) Kaleb Barham	Yamaha									13	DNS	10	7	8	7	13	16	145
10	(Japan) Haruki Yokoyama	Kawasaki	14	C	15	13	17	15	5	10	10	14	8	8	11	14	17	13	131
11	(Australia) Jesse Dobson	Yamaha	2	C	6	11	Ret	8	9	1	5	6							128
12	(Australia) Jayce Cosford	Yamaha	9	C	4	14	2	16	23	DNS					7	5	11	4	122
13	(Australia) Ryley Fitzpatrick	KTM	Ret	C	Ret	19	16	21	14	20	Ret	16	11	14	10	13	14	11	73
14	(Australia) Brock Flynn	Gas Gas	Ret	C	20	9	23	23	8	Ret	Ret	15	13	13	17	19	6	Ret	69
15	(Australia) Alex Larwood	Yamaha	6	C	Ret	4	8	4											64
16	(Australia) Ben Novak	Honda	19	C	23	27	Ret	DNS	Ret	11	9	12	18	12	18	22	21	15	54
17	(Australia) Liam Atkinson	KTM	18	C	22	21	Ret	19	22	16	15	13	15	15	Ret	17	16	12	54
18	(Australia) Reid Taylor	Gas Gas			9	Ret			12	7	Ret	DNS			5	Ret	Ret	Ret	51
19	(Australia) Caleb Ward	Husqvarna													13	8	10	5	48
20	(New Zealand) Hayden Smith	KTM					6	13	20	Ret	8	11							47
21	(Australia) Ryder Kingsford	Yamaha	20	C	12	17									12	9	12	DNS	44
22	(Australia) Blake Fox	Husqvarna	Ret	C	18	Ret	14	25	16	18	16	10	14	18	24	23	22	Ret	44
23	(Australia) Hugh McKay	KTM	15	C	Ret	10	10	DSQ	13	14									43
24	(New Zealand) Cody Cooper	Kawasaki	8	C	14	18	13	10											42
25	(Australia) Chandler Burns	Honda	23	C	33	30	Ret	17	18	13	12	18	23	21	25	24	15	14	40
26	(Australia) Jack Kukas	Husqvarna	22	C	25	12							12	11	21	18	18	Ret	34
27	(Australia) Jacob Sweet	Yamaha	26	C	19	Ret	11	22	15	29	20	Ret	17	20	19	16	Ret	DNS	31
28	(Australia) Myles Gilmore	KTM	13	C	16	16	22	14	25	Ret	17	19							31
29	(New Zealand) Madoc Dixon	KTM													15	15	19	10	25
30	(Australia) Wilson Greiner-Daish	Honda	12	C	17	23	21	DNS			22	Ret	16	17					22
31	(Australia) George Knight	Honda	17	C	24	26	18	24	21	Ret	21	17	20	16	22	25	24	17	21
32	(Australia) John Bova	KTM	30	C	11	28	DNS	DNS	17	15	Ret	DNS							20
33	(Australia) Mackenzie O'Bree	Honda	27	C	21	22	12	20	19	21	19	Ret	Ret	23	20	20	20	Ret	17
34	(Australia) Thynan Kean	Honda	24	C	DNQ	DNQ	20	18	24	17					26	21	23	19	10
35	(Australia) Braeden Krebs	Yamaha	25	C	32	20	Ret	27	Ret	19	18	21	21	19					8
36	(Australia) Mitchell Norris	Gas Gas									Ret	24			Ret	27	25	18	3
37	(Australia) Seton Broomhall	Yamaha	33	C	29	DNS	19	26	30	23	25	23			31	34	Ret	21	2
38	(Australia) Charli Cannon	Yamaha											19	22					2
39	(Australia) Jack McLean	Yamaha	32	C	Ret	33					24	20			30	30	Ret	DNS	1
40	(Australia) James Beston	Yamaha											22	26	23	26	26	20	1
	(Australia) Korey McMahon	Gas Gas	21	C															0
	(Australia) Elijah Wiese	Yamaha					Ret	DNS			23	22			28	31	27	22	0
	(Australia) Riley Fucsko	Husqvarna	29	C	26	29	Ret	DNS	27	22			24	24					0
	(Australia) Harrison Foster	Kawasaki	DNQ	C	30	31	Ret	29	26	24	28	26	28	25	Ret	29	Ret	23	0
	(Australia) Zane Mackintosh	Kawasaki	31	C	DNS	32	NC	30	Ret	DNS	27	27	26	28	Ret	DNS	28	24	0
	(Australia) Jyle Campbell	Yamaha			DNS	24													0
	(Australia) Jayden Conforto	Honda					Ret	28	28	31	26	25							0
	(Australia) Connar Adams	KTM	28	C	28	25													0
	(Australia) Aiden Bloom	Yamaha	DNQ	C					34	30					32	32	29	25	0
	(New Zealand) Curtis King	KTM	DNS	C	DNQ	DNQ			29	25	Ret	DNS	DNS	DNS					0
	(Australia) Blake Waldon	Yamaha											25	Ret	DNQ	DNQ	31	Ret	0
	(Australia) Ojai Maguire	Kawasaki											27	27	Ret	33	30	26	0
	(Australia) Justin Harrow	KTM	DNQ	C	DNQ	DNQ			32	26					29	Ret			0
	(Australia) Jack Kitchen	Honda													27	28			0
	(Australia) Seth Hardman	KTM	DNQ	C	DNQ	DNQ			33	27									0
	(Australia) Isaac Atkins	KTM									30	28							0
	(Australia) Connor Whitney	Honda			31	Ret	Ret	DNS	Ret	28									0
	(Australia) Shaun Snow	Husqvarna									29	29							0
	(Australia) Lachlan Lee	Yamaha											29	29					0
	(Australia) Jarrod Whitney	Yamaha			DNQ	Ret	Ret	DNS	31	Ret									0
	(Australia) Zachary Joy	Honda	34	C	34	34													0
	(Australia) Max Barrass	Husqvarna													Ret	Ret	Ret	Ret	0
	(Australia) Bradley Baling	Honda					Ret	Ret	DNQ	DNQ									0
	(Australia) Matt Moss	Yamaha							Ret	Ret									0
	(Australia) Caleb Goullet	Gas Gas									Ret	Ret							0
	(Australia) Deegan Mancinelli	KTM													Ret	DNS	DNS	DNS	0
	(Australia) Emma Milesevic	Honda					Ret	DNS											0
	(Australia) Luke Reardon	Yamaha													Ret	DNS			0
	(Australia) Tye Jones	Gas Gas	Ret	C															0
	(Australia) Jeremy Waters	Honda							DNS	DNS									0
	(Australia) Brayden Erbacher^{†}	Yamaha	DNS^{†}	C															0
	(Australia) Brock Godfrey	KTM			DNQ	DNQ													0
	(Australia) Charlie Holmes	Yamaha	DNQ	C															0
	(Australia) Sam Murray	Husqvarna	DNQ	C															0
	(Australia) Benjamin McAliece	Yamaha	DNQ	C															0
Pos	Rider	Bike	WON (Victoria (state))		APP (New South Wales)		WOD (Victoria (state))		MAI (New South Wales)		GIL (South Australia)		TOO (Queensland)		QLD (Queensland)		COO (Queensland)		Points
