= Jed Beaton =

Australian motocross racer

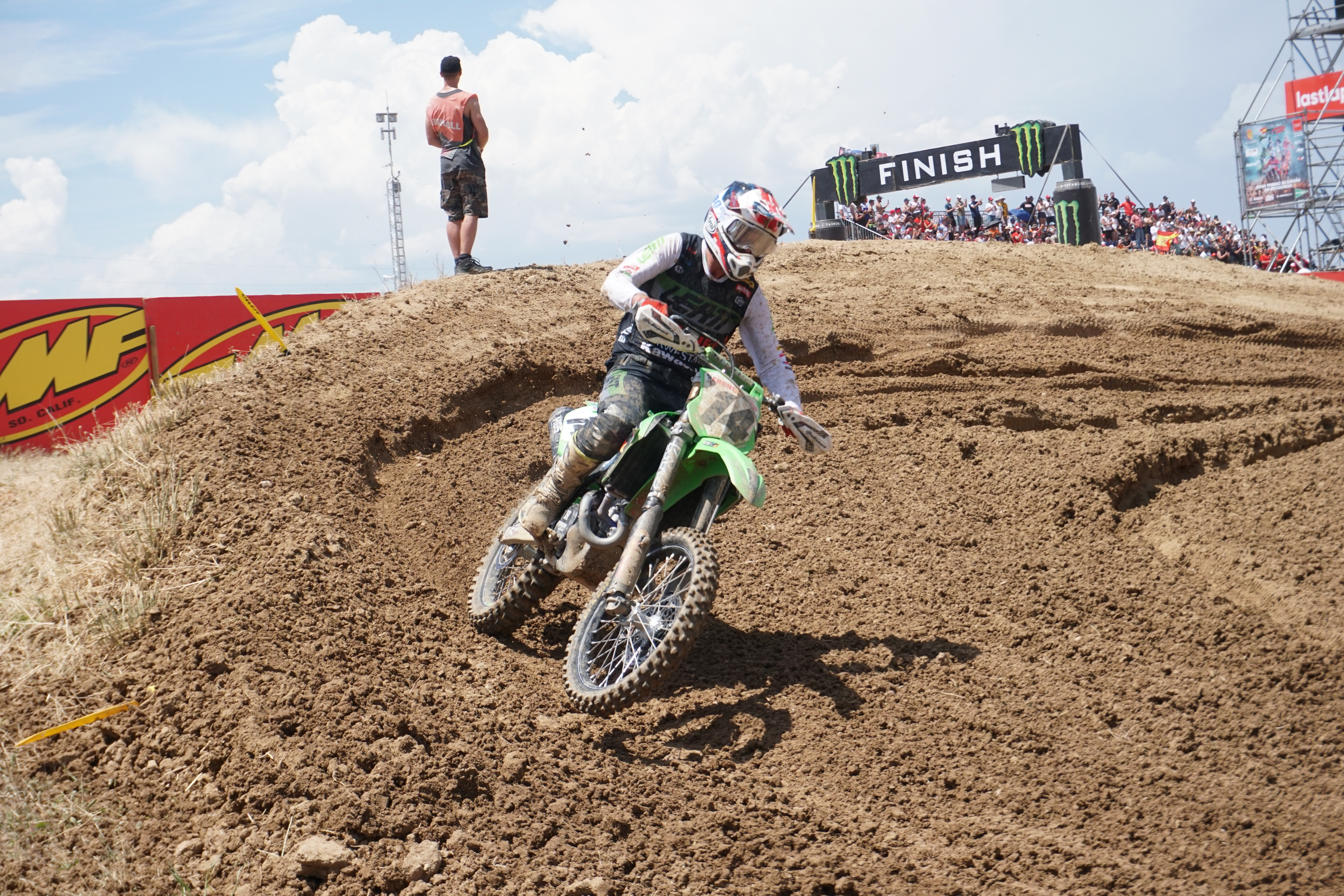
- Nationality: Australian
- Born: 28 January 1998 (age 28); Latrobe, Tasmania, Australia
- Current team: CDR Yamaha Monster Energy Team
- Bike number: 14

Jed Richard Beaton (born 28 January 1998) is an Australian professional Motocross racer. Beaton raced in the FIM Motocross World Championship from 2017 to 2022.

In his World Championship career, he achieved eight overall podiums and one race win with a highest overall championship position of fourth in the MX2 class.

Beaton represented his country at the 2026 Motocross des Nations, his only appearance at the event to date.

In his native Australia, Beaton is a two-time national champion, winning the MX2 class in 2016 and the MX1 class ten years later in 2026. He has also finished second in the MX1 class during the 2023 and 2024 seasons.

Beaton is the younger brother of Ross Beaton, who has also competed across Australia in motocross.

== Career ==
=== Junior Career ===
Beaton began racing in his native Tasmania before his family moved to Victoria during his time in the junior ranks. He became part of Yamaha's official Junior Racing Team setup and as part of this was able to take the title in the 125cc class for 13-15 year olds in the 2013 Australian Junior Motocross Championship. In addition to this, he finished as runner-up in the same age category for the 250cc class.

Beaton made his debut in the MXD class in the 2014 season, winning the opening round and taking the championship lead in the process. His championship hit problems however after firstly having to ride the fourth round days after having his appendix removed and then later fracturing his fibula in a regional event.

=== 250 Career ===
Beaton moved into the MX2 class of the Australian MX Nationals for the 2015 season with the factory supported Serco Yamaha team. He started his rookie season in the best possible way, by winning the opening round ahead of teammate and defending champion Luke Clout. Despite not being able to maintain his championship lead, he obtained several other notable results on his way to fourth in the standings. He was not retained by the Serco Yamaha team for the 2016 season and eventually was picked up by DPH Motorsports for his second MX2 campaign. This move saw Beaton execute a highly successful season, winning several races including a double victory at the third round, to pick up his first senior title in Australia. In addition this, he travelled to Switzerland to compete in the final round of the EMX250 class of the European Motocross Championship, scoring ten points. Following his championship winning season, Beaton was announced to be part of Australia's team at the 2016 Motocross des Nations. He however had to withdraw from the team due to a fractured collarbone, being replaced by Mitchell Evans.

Beaton moved to the European Championship paddock full-time for the 2017 European Motocross Championship with the Carglass Honda Racing team. He eventually finished fourteenth in the EMX250 standings after missing two rounds later in the season, with a second place in race two in Switzerland being his best result. In addition, Beaton was drafted into the factory Honda team for four rounds of the MX2 class of the 2017 FIM Motocross World Championship. At the final round of the year at Villars-sous-Écot, Beaton was able to master the muddy conditions to finish third overall, recording a World Championship podium at the fourth attempt.

Beaton made his full-time transition to the MX2 class in the 2018 FIM Motocross World Championship, signing for the F&H Racing Team. Beaton immediately established himself as a top-ten rider in the series, before picking up another podium at the Portuguese round. At the ninth round of the series in Great Britain, Beaton suffered multiple injuries including a broken right ankle as well as a left tibia and fibula. After missing the remainder of the 2018 season, Beaton signed for the factory Rockstar Energy Husqvarna team for 2019. After recovering from injuries sustained the previous season, Beaton then damaged vertebrae in his back during a pre-season race, causing him to miss the opening round. He returned at the second round and gradually improved, picking up a third in the opening race at Mantua. A fractured sternum later in the year caused him to miss the final five rounds of the championship, recording a final position of 12th.

After his injury struggles of the previous two seasons, Beaton achieved his best World Championship results to date during the 2020 FIM Motocross World Championship. Fourth in the final MX2 standings included three visits to the overall podium and his first race win in the second moto at round nine. The 2021 FIM Motocross World Championship would be his final season in he MX2 class and although he did not win another race, he did record another three overall podiums. Beaton was a consistent threat at the front of the field, finishing ten races inside the top-three and achieving a final championship position of fifth.

=== 450 Career ===
Due to the under-23 age rule, Beaton had to move into the MXGP class for the 2022 FIM Motocross World Championship, re-joining the F&H Kawasaki team. He had a strong start to the season, finishing sixth overall at the opening round, but failed to match that high through the rest of the year. A shoulder injury sustained at the second round dogged the Australian throughout the rest of the season, causing him to miss several rounds at one point. For 2023, Beaton returned to Australia full-time, being signed by the Boost Mobile Honda Racing Team. Riding in the MX1 class of the 2023 ProMX Championship, he finished second in the standings behind Dean Ferris, with an overall win at the second round being the highlight. In addition to this, Beaton rode at the eighth round of the 2023 AMA National Motocross Championship, scoring eight points in the 450 class.

For the 2024 season, Beaton signed for the CDR Yamaha team, returning to Yamaha for the first time since moving to Europe. In addition to this, he was drafted into the Altherm JCR Yamaha team to replace the injured Maximus Purvis in the MX1 class of the 2024 New Zealand Motocross Championship. Beaton won two of the four rounds of the New Zealand championship and eventually finished second in the final standings following a tight championship battle with Hamish Harwood. In the 2024 ProMX Championship, Beaton was engaged in a season long battle with Honda rider Kyle Webster. Beaton only finished outside the top-two places once during the course of the season and at the last round won both races to finish on the same amount of points as Webster at the top of the standings. However, due to Webster's higher number of race wins, Beaton would again settle for the runner-up spot. Following this, he competed in the 2024 Australian Supercross Championship, his first foray into supercross for nine years.

The 2025 ProMX Championship saw Beaton repeat the previous season's battle with Kyle Webster for the MX1 championship. After Webster failed to finish in the second race of the year and with Beaton not finishing outside the top-two in every race across the first six rounds, he appeared to have the upper hand in the championship. However, a broken femur sustained in a training crash prior to the final two rounds saw Beaton ruled out and ultimately end the championship in fourth. Returning to racing in the 2026 ProMX Championship, Beaton was again in now familiar competition with Webster for the MX1 title. This time, however, he had the upper hand from early on by taking a maximum score in the first two rounds. He would win three of the remaining six rounds, taking seven more race wins as part of this and finally taking his first MX1 title - ten years after he won the MX2 crown. Following this he travelled to America and competed in the final three rounds of the 2026 AMA National Motocross Championship, finishing seventh overall in the first of these and fifty-eight points in total. With the Lawrence brothers opting not to compete, Beaton made his first appearance representing his country at the 2026 Motocross des Nations. As Australia were defending champions, Beaton rode with the number one on his bike and finished sixth in his qualifying race, before finishing eleventh and tenth in his two main races.

== Honours ==
ProMX

- MX1: 2026 (gold) , 2023 & 2024 (silver)
- MX2: 2016 (gold)

New Zealand Motocross Championship

- MX1: 2024 (silver)

Australian Junior Motocross Championship

- 250cc 13-15yrs: 2013 (silver)
- 125cc 13-15yrs: 2013 (gold)

== Career statistics ==
=== Motocross des Nations ===
Year	Location	Nation	Class	Teammates	Team Overall	Individual Overall
2026	(France) Ernée	AUS	MXGP	Alex Larwood; Aaron Tanti	9th	6th

=== FIM Motocross World Championship ===
==== By season ====
Season	Class	Number	Motorcycle	Team	Race	Race Wins	Overall Wins	Race Top-3	Overall Podium	Pts	Plcd
2017	MX2	14	Honda	Team HRC	8	0	0	1	1	71	26th
2018	MX2	14	Kawasaki	F&H Racing Team	18	0	0	1	1	216	16th
2019	MX2	14	Husqvarna	Rockstar Energy Husqvarna Factory Racing	22	0	0	1	0	250	12th
2020	MX2	14	Husqvarna	Rockstar Energy Husqvarna Factory Racing	36	1	0	9	3	564	4th
2021	MX2	14	Husqvarna	Rockstar Energy Husqvarna Factory Racing	36	0	0	10	3	540	5th
2022	MXGP	14	Kawasaki	F&H Kawasaki Racing Team	28	0	0	0	0	190	19th
Total					148	1	0	22	8	1831	

=== AMA National Motocross Championship ===
==== By season ====
Season	Class	Number	Motorcycle	Team	Races	Race Wins	Overall Wins	Race Top-3	Overall Podium	Pts	Plcd
2023	450	104	Honda	Boost Mobile Honda Racing Team	2	0	0	0	0	8	46th
2026	450	209	Yamaha	Monster Energy CDR Yamaha	6	0	0	0	0	58	22nd
Total					8	0	0	0	0	66	
