= Kyle Webster =

Australian motocross racer

- Nationality: Australian
- Born: 24 April 1996 (age 30); South Africa
- Current team: Team HRC Honda Racing Australia
- Bike number: 96

Kyle Webster (born 24 April 1996) is a South African-born Australian professional Motocross and Supercross racer. Webster was part of the Australian teams that won the 2024 and 2025 Motocross des Nations. The 2024 edition was first time the country had won the event.

Webster is a three-time national champion of Australia, with his most recent title coming in the MX1 class in the 2025 ProMX Championship.

Alongside his victory with the team at the 2024 and 2025 editions, Webster also represented Australia at the 2019 Motocross des Nations.

== Early life ==
Webster was born in South Africa, and it was in this country that he first raced motorcycles as a child. He had the opportunity to travel to the United States during this period, where he competed at the KTM SX Cup competition. His family moved to the United Kingdom for a time, where he continued racing, before they again relocated to Perth in Western Australia.

== Career ==
=== Junior career ===
The Australian Junior Motocross Championship was held at Wanneroo in Western Australia in 2008, where Webster won the 9–12 years Mini Lites class. Due to the distances involved in competing around Australia, Webster only made one further appearance at the national junior championships, finishing third in the 250cc 13-15yrs class in 2011. In 2013, he made three appearances in the under-19 MXD class of the Australian MX Nationals series, finishing fourth overall at the final round of the season. This was followed by Webster competing in the full season of the MXD class in 2014, which included a first overall podium at the fourth round.

=== 250 Career ===
Webster moved to the east coast of Australia for the first time in 2015 and moved up to the MX2 class full-time. For the final two rounds of the season and the following supercross championship, Webster was signed up to compete for the SFC Racing Team. The 2016 season saw him compete on a Honda for the first time, as the Penrite CRF Honda Racing Team signed him up. He finished second overall at the third round in muddy conditions and at the fifth round in Western Australia won his first race at the Wanneroo track he knew well from his junior days. At the final round of that season's AUS-X Open Australian Supercross Championship, Webster scored a surprise third to finish the year with his first supercross podium.

At the beginning of 2017, Webster made his FIM Motocross World Championship debut in the MX2 class at the Indonesian round. In muddy conditions, he was unable to finish either of the main races. Following this, he continued to improve at the Australian MX Nationals, finishing fifth in the final MX2 standings and scoring several podiums throughout the season. Continuing with the same Honda team in 2018, Webster took two overall round wins to finish seventh in the final MX2 class standings. The 2019 season would see him battle for the MX2 class title with Wilson Todd, winning three overall victories and four race wins to finish as runner-up in the final standings. Following this, Webster was selected to compete in the 2019 Motocross des Nations, his first time representing his country at the event. As the event took place in The Netherlands on his favoured surface of sand, he surprised many people when he finished third in the Saturday qualifying race for the MX2 class, beating riders such as Jago Geerts, Alberto Forato and Maxime Renaux. The team finished fifteenth overall after the main Sunday races, where Webster had a best finish of fourteenth in his second race.

Due to the COVID-19 pandemic, Motorcycling Australia cancelled the domestic racing season in 2020. Webster was given the opportunity to stand in for the injured Benoît Paturel in the MXGP class of the 2020 FIM Motocross World Championship for the JM Honda Racing team. A shoulder injury sustained at his first event for the team meant that he missed the rest of the season. Australian domestic motocross racing resumed in 2021 and Webster would have a dominant season in the shortened ProMX championship, taking the overall win in the MX2 class in all three contested rounds to be crowned national champion.

=== 450 Career ===
After picking up his first ProMX title in 2021, Webster moved up to ride a 450 full-time in the MX1 class for 2022. He missed four rounds of that year's championship after breaking his left foot and right ankle in a training crash but upon his return was able to win the final race of the season. Following this, he appeared as a wildcard at the Australian round of the 2022 FIM Supercross World Championship in the WSX class, finishing seventh in the second race. Webster was fast throughout the 2023 ProMX Championship season, winning two overall rounds and taking four race wins, which resulted in him finishing fifth in the final standings. He again appeared in the FIM Supercross World Championship, dropping down to the SX2 class to ride a 250 in the final two rounds for the Honda NILS team, with a best finish of fourth in the second race at the round in Abu Dhabi.

The 2024 season would include several milestones in Webster's career. After a season-long battle with Jed Beaton, Webster would win the MX1 class in the 2024 ProMX Championship, his first title in the category. The pair dominated the championship, winning every round and all but two races between them. The championship was so tight that they ended with the same amount of points, but Webster took the title with a superior number of race wins (ten throughout the season). Alongside this, and with help from sponsor Mobile X, he made his debut racing in the AMA Motocross Championship, starting in the fifth and sixth rounds of the 450 class. Across the two rounds, he finished three of the four races in the top ten and finished eighth overall at the Red Bud round after battling for the lead in the early stages of the second race. These results would see him selected to represent Australia for the second time at the 2024 Motocross des Nations and being partnered by the Lawrence brothers would mean that he had to ride a 250 in the MX2 class. Riding a bike he had not raced all year, he showed good speed throughout the weekend, finishing eleventh and nineteenth in his main races to play a crucial role in the country winning their first title at the event. Following this, Webster competed in two rounds of the 2024 FIM Supercross World Championship as a wildcard at the Perth double-header rounds, holeshotting and leading a race in the WSX class during this.

The 2025 ProMX Championship would see Webster again battle Jed Beaton in the MX1 class. After not finishing the second race at the opening round, Webster won the following three rounds but still had a deficit due to his one race without a score. Beaton picking up an injury ahead of the final two rounds meant that Webster was able to successfully defend his crown in the class. Following this, Webster competed in the final three rounds of the 2025 AMA National Motocross Championship, collecting three top-ten race finishes in the 450 class. With the Australian team keeping their lineup unchanged from the previous season's maiden win, Webster dropped down to a 250 again to prepare for and race the 2025 Motocross des Nations. Putting on a similar performance to the previous year, Webster fought back hard in the two main races after hitting the deck in the first corner in both starts. Pulling through the field to a thirteenth in the second race meant this score, along with the results of the Lawrence brothers, put Australia on the top step for the second year running.

Webster began the 2026 ProMX Championship as the two-time defending MX1 champion. After finishing second at the opening round, he claimed the overall victory at Gillman and remained in championship contention during the first half of the series. Webster also contested the opening two rounds of the 2026 AMA National Motocross Championship, finishing 13th overall at Fox Raceway before dislocating his right shoulder at Hangtown. Despite the injury, he returned to Australia and completed the ProMX season, recording further race victories and finishing third in the MX1 championship behind Jed Beaton and Aaron Tanti. Webster subsequently underwent shoulder surgery and withdrew from the remainder of the 2026 racing season, which ruled him out of representing Australia at the 2026 Motocross des Nations.

== Honours ==
Motocross des Nations

- Team Overall: 2024 & 2025 (gold)

ProMX

- MX1: 2024 & 2025 (gold) , 2026 (bronze)
- MX2: 2021 (gold) , 2019 (silver)

Australian Junior Motocross Championship

- 250cc 13-15 yrs: 2011 (bronze)
- 9-12 yrs Mini Lites: 2008 (gold)

== Career statistics ==
=== Motocross des Nations ===
Year	Location	Nation	Class	Teammates	Team Overall	Individual Overall
2019	(Netherlands) Assen	AUS	MX2	Dean Ferris; Regan Duffy	15th	7th
2024	(United Kingdom) Matterley Basin	AUS	MX2	Hunter Lawrence; Jett Lawrence	1st	6th
2025	(United States) Ironman	AUS	MX2	Jett Lawrence; Hunter Lawrence	1st	5th

=== FIM Motocross World Championship ===
==== By season ====
Season	Class	Number	Motorcycle	Team	Race	Race Wins	Overall Wins	Race Top-3	Overall Podium	Pts	Plcd
2017	MX2	23	Honda	Penrite CRF Honda Racing	2	0	0	0	0	0	N/A
2020	MXGP	96	Honda	JM Honda Racing	2	0	0	0	0	0	N/A
Total					4	0	0	0	0	0	

=== FIM Supercross World Championship ===
==== By season ====
Season	Class	Number	Motorcycle	Team	Overall Wins	Overall Podium	Pts	Plcd
2022	WSX	96	Honda	Team HRC Australia	0	0	18	21st
2023	SX2	96	Honda	Honda NILS	0	0	39	22nd
2024	WSX	96	Honda	Boost Mobile Fire Power Honda HRC	0	0	62	15th

=== AMA National Motocross Championship ===
==== By season ====
Season	Class	Number	Motorcycle	Team	Races	Race Wins	Overall Wins	Race Top-3	Overall Podium	Pts	Plcd
2024	450	762	Honda	Mobile X Fire Power Honda	4	0	0	0	0	45	23rd
2025	450	69	Honda	Quadlock Honda Racing	5	0	0	0	0	45	26th
2026	450	76	Honda	Quadlock Honda Racing	3	0	0	0	0	16	37th
Total					12	0	0	0	0	106	
