= 2024 New Zealand Motocross Championship =

New Zealand Motocross Competition in 2024

The 2024 New Zealand Motocross Championship season was the 50th New Zealand Motocross Championship season.

The series had four rounds across the country, running from early February to mid April.

Maximus Purvis was the reigning champion in the MX1 class, however, he did not defend his title due to recovering from knee surgery. In the MX2 class, Cody Cooper was the reigning champion after picking up his tenth senior national title in the 2023 New Zealand Motocross Championship.

At the conclusion of the season, it was Hamish Harwood who won the MX1 title. This was Harwood's sixth senior national title overall and came after a season-long battle with former Motocross World Championship racer Jed Beaton. The MX2 class saw a three-way championship battle between reigning champion Cooper, Australian rider Caleb Ward and James Scott. In the end it was Scott who would take away his first senior national title by seven points over Cooper.

== Race calendar and results ==
=== MX1 ===
Round	Date	Location	Race 1 Winner	Race 2 Winner	Race 3 Winner	Round Winner
1	3 February	Rotorua	(New Zealand) Hamish Harwood	(New Zealand) Hamish Harwood	(Australia) Jed Beaton	(New Zealand) Hamish Harwood
2	25 February	Balclutha	(Australia) Jed Beaton	(New Zealand) Hamish Harwood	(Australia) Jed Beaton	(Australia) Jed Beaton
3	23 March	Pukekohe	(New Zealand) Hamish Harwood	(New Zealand) Hamish Harwood	(New Zealand) Hamish Harwood	(New Zealand) Hamish Harwood
4	14 April	Taranaki	(Australia) Jed Beaton	(Australia) Jed Beaton	(New Zealand) Hamish Harwood	(Australia) Jed Beaton

=== MX2 ===
Round	Date	Location	Race 1 Winner	Race 2 Winner	Race 3 Winner	Round Winner
1	3 February	Rotorua	(New Zealand) James Scott	(New Zealand) Cody Cooper	(Australia) Caleb Ward	(New Zealand) James Scott
2	25 February	Balclutha	(New Zealand) Cody Cooper	(New Zealand) Cody Cooper	(Australia) Caleb Ward	(New Zealand) Cody Cooper
3	23 March	Pukekohe	(New Zealand) James Scott	(New Zealand) James Scott	(Australia) Caleb Ward	(New Zealand) James Scott
4	14 April	Taranaki	(New Zealand) James Scott	(New Zealand) Cody Cooper	(New Zealand) James Scott	(New Zealand) James Scott

=== Circuit locations ===
2024 New Zealand Motocross Championship locations

== MX1 ==
=== Participants ===
Team	Constructor	No	Rider	Rounds
Altherm JCR Yamaha	Yamaha	B	(Australia) Jed Beaton	All
	Husqvarna	2	(New Zealand) Darryl King	4
Bikeforce Suzuki New Zealand	Suzuki	8	(New Zealand) Tyler Steiner	All
Powerzone Motorcycles	Kawasaki	9	(New Zealand) Madison Latta	All
Murray Thorn Motorcycles	Yamaha	10	(New Zealand) Ethan Waters	1
CML Gas Gas	Gas Gas	16	(New Zealand) Hayden Smith	1–2
	Gas Gas	18	(New Zealand) Josh de Reus	All
KTM Canada	KTM	23	(New Zealand) Josiah Natzke	1
Pumps & Filters	Yamaha	24	(New Zealand) Liam Hutton	All
The Riders Circle	Yamaha	32	(New Zealand) James Rountree	All
	KTM	42	(New Zealand) Josh Bensemann	2
	Yamaha	44	(New Zealand) Max Singleton	All
Tasman Honda	Honda	48	(New Zealand) Nic D'Arcy	1–3
LMC Husqvarna Racing	Husqvarna	57	(New Zealand) Joshua Jack	All
Vertex Lubricants	KTM	72	(New Zealand) Seth Thompson	All
	Gas Gas	73	(New Zealand) Ezra Holmes	1–2
Mahana Earthworks	Yamaha	81	(New Zealand) Hayden Wilkinson	All
	Yamaha	82	(New Zealand) Callem McCulloch	3
Honda Motul Racing New Zealand	Honda	93	(New Zealand) Jack Treloar	All
MTF Finance	Yamaha	115	(New Zealand) Liam Kerr	All
TSS Motocycles	Gas Gas	124	(New Zealand) Zak Nolan	1–3
CML KTM Racing	KTM	153	(New Zealand) Hamish Harwood	All
	KTM	157	(New Zealand) Logan Maddren	3
Action Moto	Kawasaki	179	(New Zealand) Davi Jordan	All
	KTM	254	(New Zealand) Cam Negus	1
	Yamaha	255	(New Zealand) Luke van der Lee	1
	Honda	338	(New Zealand) Brad Groombridge	4
City Honda	Honda	393	(New Zealand) Toby Winiata	All
Kawasaki New Zealand Crownkiwi	Kawasaki	491	(New Zealand) Sam Cuthbertson	All
Hawk Moto Lindsay Farm	Kawasaki	712	(New Zealand) David Ashton	1, 3–4
	Yamaha	734	(New Zealand) Jonathan Martelli	1
	Gas Gas	921	(New Zealand) Luke Maitland	All
Mach 1 Yamaha	Yamaha	950	(New Zealand) Preeda Boon	4

=== Riders Championship ===
Points are awarded to finishers of the main races, in the following format:

Position	1st	2nd	3rd	4th	5th	6th	7th	8th	9th	10th	11th	12th	13th	14th	15th	16th	17th	18th	19th	20th
Points	25	22	20	18	16	15	14	13	12	11	10	9	8	7	6	5	4	3	2	1

Pos	Rider	Bike	ROT			BAL			PUK			TAR			Points
1	(New Zealand) Hamish Harwood	KTM	1	1	2	2	1	2	1	1	1	2	2	1	285
2	(Australia) Jed Beaton	Yamaha	5	3	1	1	2	1	2	2	2	1	1	2	271
3	(New Zealand) Jack Treloar	Honda	3	4	4	3	4	4	3	5	4	3	3	3	226
4	(New Zealand) Joshua Jack	Husqvarna	6	7	6	5	5	5	6	4	3	5	4	Ret	179
5	(New Zealand) Luke Maitland	Gas Gas	12	6	7	11	9	7	4	3	5	4	12	Ret	155
6	(New Zealand) Sam Cuthbertson	Kawasaki	8	8	9	7	7	9	14	9	6	16	15	10	134
7	(New Zealand) Seth Thompson	KTM	7	20	10	6	21	Ret	5	6	13	10	5	5	123
8	(New Zealand) Hayden Wilkinson	Yamaha	13	16	15	12	10	10	7	7	9	12	10	9	122
9	(New Zealand) Tyler Steiner	Suzuki	23	11	19	9	6	6	13	10	7	17	7	6	120
10	(New Zealand) Hayden Smith	Gas Gas	4	5	5	4	3	3							108
11	(New Zealand) James Rountree	Yamaha	15	10	12	17	13	14	9	13	11	15	9	11	103
12	(New Zealand) Madison Latta	Kawasaki	20	14	13	8	8	8	20	18	DNS	9	11	8	94
13	(New Zealand) Toby Winiata	Honda	11	18	14	10	11	16	8	17	16	11	14	13	93
14	(New Zealand) Davi Jordan	Kawasaki	19	17	Ret	18	16	13	11	12	8	8	8	12	89
15	(New Zealand) Max Singleton	Yamaha	22	15	16	13	17	11	16	8	12	14	13	14	82
16	(New Zealand) Nic D'Arcy	Honda	18	12	20	14	12	12	10	11	10				70
17	(New Zealand) Josiah Natzke	KTM	2	2	3										64
18	(New Zealand) Josh de Reus	Gas Gas	14	21	18	16	15	17	12	16	17	13	16	15	62
19	(New Zealand) Brad Groombridge	Honda										6	6	4	48
20	(New Zealand) Liam Hutton	Yamaha	25	22	21	19	18	18	17	14	15	18	17	16	37
21	(New Zealand) Ethan Waters	Yamaha	9	9	8										37
22	(New Zealand) Ezra Holmes	Gas Gas	16	19	17	15	14	15							30
23	(New Zealand) Luke van der Lee	Yamaha	10	13	11										29
24	(New Zealand) Preeda Boon	Yamaha										7	Ret	7	28
25	(New Zealand) Liam Kerr	Yamaha	24	23	22	20	19	19	19	19	18	19	19	17	20
26	(New Zealand) Logan Maddren	KTM							15	15	14				19
27	(New Zealand) David Ashton	Kawasaki	27	24	24				18	20	19	21	20	18	10
28	(New Zealand) Darryl King	Husqvarna										20	18	19	6
29	(New Zealand) Jonathan Martelli	Yamaha	17	Ret	DNS										4
30	(New Zealand) Zak Nolan	Gas Gas	26	25	23	22	20	20	Ret	Ret	DNS				2
	(New Zealand) Josh Bensemann	KTM				21	Ret	DNS							0
	(New Zealand) Cam Negus	KTM	21	DNS	DNS										0
	(New Zealand) Callem McCulloch	Yamaha							DNS	DNS	DNS				0
Pos	Rider	Bike	ROT			BAL			PUK			TAR			Points

== MX2 ==
=== Participants ===
Team	Constructor	No	Rider	Rounds
WBR Bulk Nutrients Yamaha	Yamaha	D	(Australia) Kobe Drew	1
CML Gas Gas	Gas Gas	1	(New Zealand) Cody Cooper	All
CML KTM Racing	KTM	4	(New Zealand) Madoc Dixon	1
CML KTM Racing	KTM	192	(New Zealand) Reuben Smith	All
Empire Kawasaki	Kawasaki	10	(Australia) Taylah McCutcheon	1
Honda Motul Racing New Zealand	Honda	14	(New Zealand) Cobie Bourke	All
Honda Motul Racing New Zealand	Honda	722	(New Zealand) Phoenix van Dusschoten	1, 3
Hamburger Transport	Kawasaki	17	(New Zealand) Bradley Hamburger	2
Yamaha Whangarei	Yamaha	20	(New Zealand) Logan Denize	All
Team MR Motorcycles	Yamaha	22	(New Zealand) Flynn Watts	1
Southland Honda	Honda	26	(New Zealand) Mitch Weir	2–4
Crownkiwi Alpinestars Honda	Honda	41	(New Zealand) Curtis King	All
Crownkiwi Alpinestars Honda	Honda	110	(New Zealand) Rian King	All
Nelson Motorcycles	KTM	43	(New Zealand) Luke Heaphy	All
Scammell Honda Race Team	Honda	55	(New Zealand) Jack Symon	All
Scammell Honda Race Team	Honda	58	(New Zealand) Ryan Harris	All
Scammell Honda Race Team	Honda	242	(New Zealand) Michael Buchanan	2
Altherm JCR Yamaha	Yamaha	108	(New Zealand) James Scott	All
	KTM	115	(New Zealand) Declan Pyper	3
	KTM	121	(New Zealand) Jack Coleman	1, 3
	KTM	122	(New Zealand) Ryan Gwynn	2
	KTM	141	(New Zealand) Freddie Gordon	1–2
Team MR Moto	KTM	144	(New Zealand) Tyler Brown	1
Team MR Moto	KTM	999	(New Zealand) Jared Hannon	All
	KTM	163	(New Zealand) Ryan Crawford	2
Holeshot MX	Husqvarna	164	(New Zealand) Reece McBride	2
Action Moto Ndub	Kawasaki	178	(New Zealand) Ajay Jordon	1
Whyteline MR Motorcycles	KTM	199	(New Zealand) Alex Garland	1
Husqvarna Junior Racing	Husqvarna	254	(Australia) Jack Deveson	1
	KTM	278	(New Zealand) Yanni Emerson-Rae	1–2
Honda Hub New Plymouth	Honda	279	(New Zealand) Sam Corston	All
	Yamaha	309	(New Zealand) Nixon Parkes	1, 3–4
	Honda	363	(New Zealand) Rhys Kelly	3
Kawasaki NZ Bike Torque Taumarunui	Kawasaki	394	(New Zealand) Karaitiana Horne	2
	Yamaha	472	(New Zealand) Liam Hoffman	All
LMC Husqvarna Racing	Husqvarna	485	(Australia) Caleb Ward	All
	KTM	699	(New Zealand) Jacob Simpson	2, 4
	Yamaha	717	(New Zealand) Jayden McKenzie	1
Yamaha Whangarei	Yamaha	809	(New Zealand) Tyler Cooksley	All
MotoSouth	KTM	828	(New Zealand) Brandon Hall	2
	Yamaha	911	(New Zealand) Nate Adams	3
Maxh1 Yamaha MotoHQ	Yamaha	939	(New Zealand) Kurtis Gooch	All
	KTM	972	(New Zealand) Carlin Hedley	All
	Yamaha	982	(New Zealand) Aaron Manning	1

=== Riders Championship ===
Points are awarded to finishers of the main races, in the following format:

Position	1st	2nd	3rd	4th	5th	6th	7th	8th	9th	10th	11th	12th	13th	14th	15th	16th	17th	18th	19th	20th
Points	25	22	20	18	16	15	14	13	12	11	10	9	8	7	6	5	4	3	2	1

Pos	Rider	Bike	ROT			BAL			PUK			TAR			Points
1	(New Zealand) James Scott	Yamaha	1	2	2	2	3	3	1	1	3	1	3	1	271
2	(New Zealand) Cody Cooper	Gas Gas	4	1	3	1	1	2	5	2	2	2	1	2	264
3	(Australia) Caleb Ward	Husqvarna	3	3	1	5	2	1	2	5	1	3	2	3	253
4	(New Zealand) Jack Symon	Honda	8	8	6	3	4	4	9	9	6	4	7	6	183
5	(New Zealand) Rian King	Honda	6	5	5	4	Ret	5	3	4	4	5	4	Ret	171
6	(New Zealand) Jared Hannon	KTM	5	6	7	10	6	10	11	8	7	7	5	4	167
7	(New Zealand) Cobie Bourke	Honda	11	13	10	Ret	5	7	4	3	5	6	Ret	5	144
8	(New Zealand) Reuben Smith	KTM	10	10	8	6	10	13	10	10	8	13	6	7	141
9	(New Zealand) Curtis King	Honda	16	16	18	7	12	9	7	6	9	11	10	8	123
10	(New Zealand) Logan Denize	Yamaha	17	15	13	11	8	15	8	7	15	12	9	10	112
11	(New Zealand) Luke Heaphy	KTM	13	18	15	8	7	14	16	13	10	9	8	11	110
12	(New Zealand) Ryan Harris	Honda	19	12	17	9	9	8	15	15	16	14	14	14	90
13	(New Zealand) Carlin Hedley	Honda	14	23	16	12	13	12	13	16	13	10	12	13	87
14	(New Zealand) Tyler Cooksley	Yamaha	18	14	11	13	Ret	11	12	12	11	16	15	12	86
15	(New Zealand) Mitch Weir	Honda				14	11	6	19	14	12	15	11	15	72
16	(New Zealand) Madoc Dixon	KTM	2	4	4										58
17	(New Zealand) Nixon Parkes	Yamaha	22	21	14				17	17	14	8	13	9	55
18	(New Zealand) Jack Coleman	KTM	21	7	28				6	11	Ret				39
19	(Australia) Kobe Drew	Yamaha	7	9	9										38
20	(New Zealand) Liam Hoffman	Yamaha	25	25	23	15	14	17	18	20	19	18	16	16	36
21	(New Zealand) Flynn Watts	Yamaha	9	11	12										31
22	(New Zealand) Bradley Hamburger	Kawasaki				16	15	16							16
23	(New Zealand) Kurtis Gooch	Yamaha	27	27	25	21	19	25	Ret	DNS	DNS	17	17	17	14
24	(New Zealand) Rhys Kelly	Honda							14	Ret	17				11
25	(New Zealand) Tyler Brown	KTM	12	20	DNS										10
26	(New Zealand) Yanni Emerson-Rae	KTM	24	22	22	20	16	18							9
27	(New Zealand) Brandon Hall	KTM				17	17	20							9
28	(Australia) Jack Deveson	Husqvarna	15	19	21										8
29	(New Zealand) Sam Corston	Honda	28	28	24	18	18	21	20	DNS	DNS	Ret	DNS	DNS	7
30	(New Zealand) Aaron Manning	Yamaha	20	17	19										7
31	(New Zealand) Declan Pyper	KTM							Ret	19	18				5
32	(New Zealand) Reece McBride	Husqvarna				19	Ret	19							4
33	(New Zealand) Phoenix van Dusschoten	Honda	26	Ret	DNS				Ret	18	Ret				3
34	(New Zealand) Jayden McKenzie	Yamaha	23	24	20										1
35	(New Zealand) Jacob Simpson	KTM				26	20	22				DNS	DNS	DNS	1
	(New Zealand) Ryan Gwynn	KTM				22	21	23							0
	(New Zealand) Ryan Crawford	KTM				24	22	Ret							0
	(New Zealand) Michael Buchanan	Honda				23	23	24							0
	(New Zealand) Freddie Gordon	KTM	30	Ret	27	25	Ret	DNS							0
	(New Zealand) Ajay Jordon	Kawasaki	29	26	26										0
	(New Zealand) Alex Garland	KTM	Ret	DNS	DNS										0
	(Australia) Taylah McCutcheon	Kawasaki	Ret	DNS	DNS										0
	(New Zealand) Karaitiana Horne	Kawasaki				Ret	DNS	DNS							0
	(New Zealand) Nate Adams	Yamaha							Ret	DNS	DNS				0
Pos	Rider	Bike	ROT			BAL			PUK			TAR			Points
