= Garden Island, South Australia =

Garden Island
- Suburb
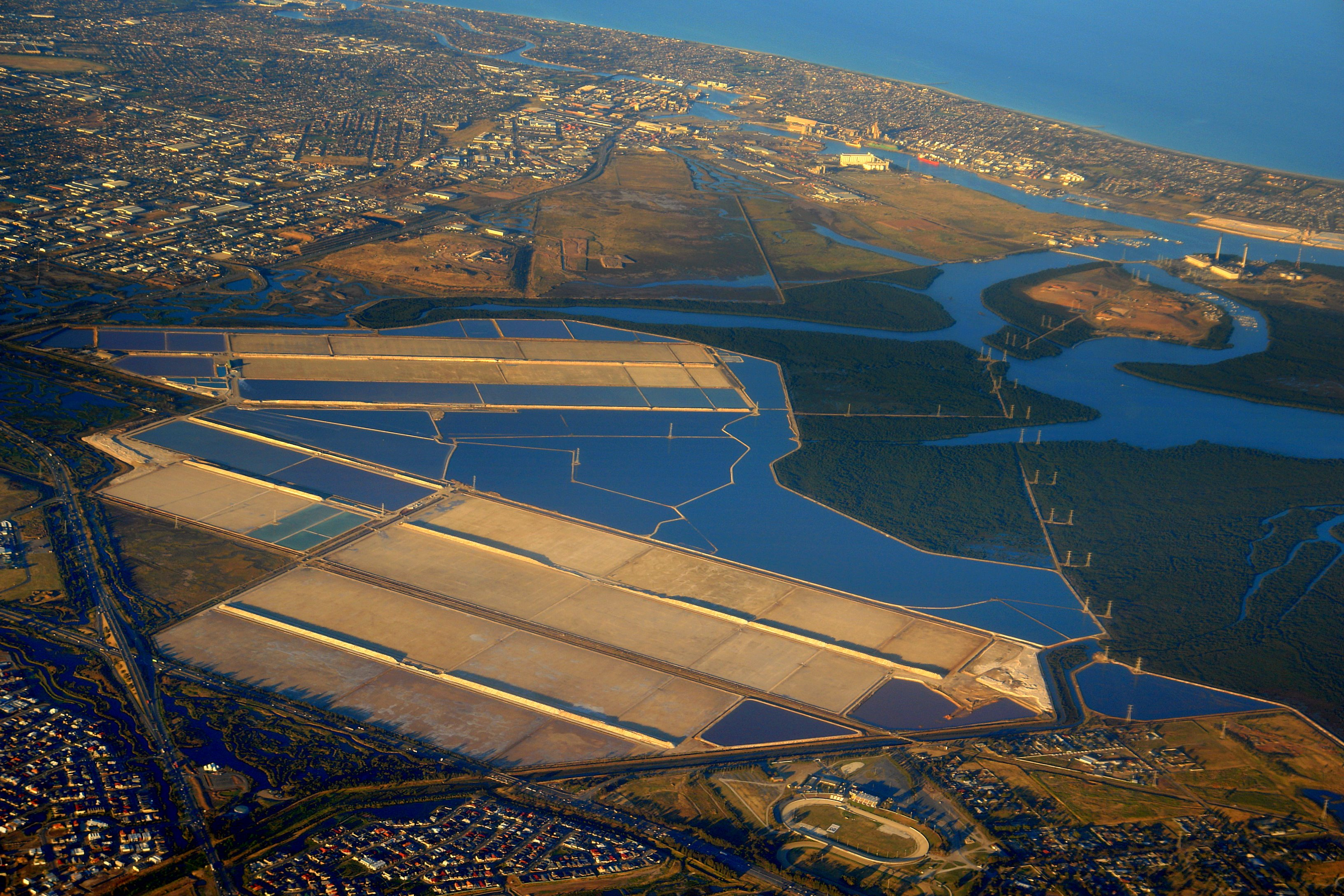
- Aerial view looking WSW of part of the Port River estuary with Garden Island being located in the top right hand corner adjacent to Torrens Island

- Coordinates: 34.807170°S 138.534450°E
- Country: Australia
- State: South Australia
- Region: Western Adelaide
- LGA: unincorporated area
- Location: 15 km (9.3 mi) north-west of Adelaide city centre
- Established: 2009

Government
  - State electorate: Port Adelaide
  - Federal division: Hindmarsh

Population
  - Total: 4 (SAL 2021)
- Time zone: UTC+9:30 (ACST)
  - Summer (DST): UTC+10:30 (ACST)
- Postcode: 5015
- County: Adelaide
- Mean max temp: 22.4 °C (72.3 °F)
- Mean min temp: 11.2 °C (52.2 °F)
- Annual rainfall: 451.1 mm (17.76 in)
Suburbs around Garden Island
Torrens Island	Torrens Island	Barker Inlet
Torrens Island	Garden Island	Barker Inlet
Port Adelaide	Gillman; Dry Creek	Dry Creek
- Coordinates; Climate; Adjoining suburbs

Garden Island is a locality in the Australian state of South Australia located in the Adelaide metropolitan area within the estuary of the Port Adelaide River about 15 kilometres (9.3 miles) north-west of the Adelaide city centre.

Its boundaries which were created in August 2009 include “the whole of the geographical feature of Garden Island” and parts of the following water bodies that adjoin the shoreline of the ‘geographic feature’ - Angas Inlet to the north, the North Arm to the south and Eastern Passage to the east.

Garden Island is located within the federal division of Port Adelaide and the state electoral district of Port Adelaide Since at least 2009, Garden Island has not been located within a local government area.

As of 2014, the majority of the land within the locality is zoned as "MFP" which refers to the Multifunction Polis, a proposed development with the Adelaide metropolitan area to create “an international and national centre for co-operative research and innovation in science, technology, environmental management, education and the arts.” The Garden Island Yacht Club and Angus Inlet Boat Club have private facilities on Garden Island. Public facilities include a boat ramp, a fishing jetty, car parking and a public toilet block. The boat ramp is used to launch and retrieve powered and unpowered recreational watercraft.
