= Eastern Rosellas =

2026 song by Miles Phillips

Single by Miles Phillips
- Released: 15 July 2026
- Genre: Rock
- Length: 1:38
- Songwriters: Joel Phillips; Miles Phillips
- Producer: Brad Dymock

"Eastern Rosellas" is a 2026 rock song by then-seven-year-old Australian singer-songwriter Miles Phillips. The song went viral in July 2026.

== Background ==
Seven year old Miles Phillips was inspired to write this song after noticing how eastern rosellas stood out while feeding various birds at his grandparents' home in Raymond Island, Victoria.

Miles Phillips co-created the song with his dad, Joel. Joel takes pride on enabling creativity in his household, saying "Writing a song is a very normal thing for people to do in our family. We love to sing about whatever we're doing".

Various versions of the song have been released such as a karaoke version and a full band version following the success of the initial Instagram video.

== Impact ==
The song has received over 1.5 million views and 3,000 comments on Instagram and TikTok. The song has been covered by artists such as Sam Cromack of Ball Park Music and Ben Lee, Lee called the song an example of "outsider art", it has also been covered by Meg Washington. It has received radio airplay and has over 1.5 million plays on Spotify across the three versions on the platform. Joel has criticised the use of artificial intelligence in music and says that this proves human creativity is still alive. Joel was impressed by the positive reception of the song on social media.

The song was used as the school bell sound at Phillips's primary school.

== Track listings ==
Digital download

1. "Eastern Rosellas" (Full Band version) - 1:39

Digital download

1. "Eastern Rosellas" (Stripped back version) - 1:38

Digital download

1. "Eastern Rosellas" (Karaoke) - 1:41

7" Vinyl (released 16 October 2026) (Impressed Records - IMP327)

1. "Eastern Rosellas" (Full Band version) - 1:39
2. "Eastern Rosellas" (Stripped back version) - 1:38
3. "Eastern Rosellas" (Karaoke) - 1:41

== Charts ==
Weekly chart performance for "Eastern Rosellas"
Chart (2026)	Peak position
Australian Artist (ARIA)	5
Australian Independent (AIR)	1
