= Gillman, South Australia =

Gillman
- Suburb
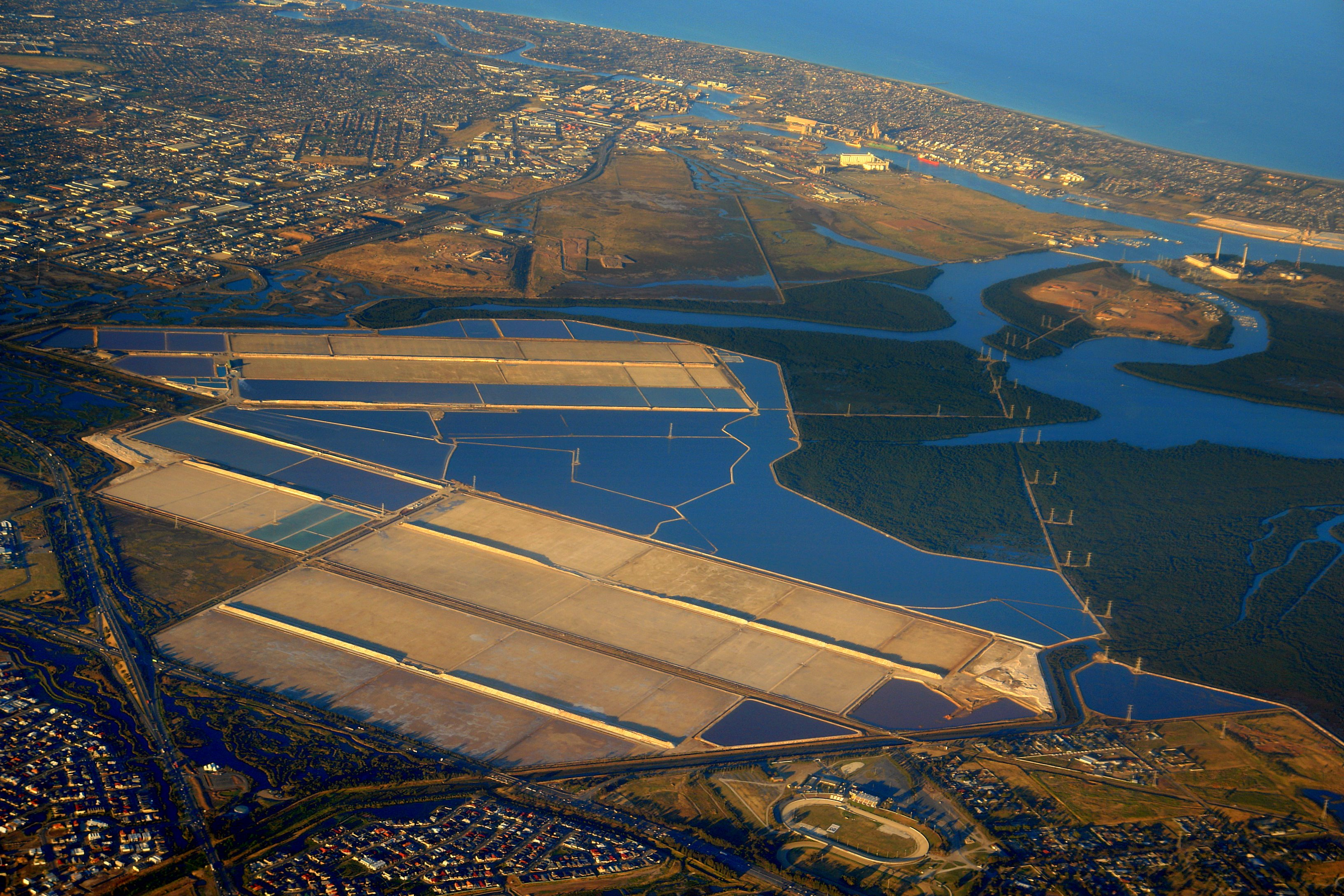
- Aerial view of Gillman and surrounding areas

- Interactive map of Gillman
- Coordinates: 34°50′28″S 138°31′37″E
- Country: Australia
- State: South Australia
- City: Adelaide
- LGA: City of Port Adelaide Enfield

Government
  - State electorate: Port Adelaide
  - Federal division: Hindmarsh

Population
  - Total: 76 (SAL 2021)
- Postcode: 5013
Suburbs around Gillman
Port Adelaide; Garden Island	Garden Island	Garden Island
Port Adelaide	Gillman	Dry Creek; Wingfield
Port Adelaide; Rosewater	Rosewater	Ottoway

Gillman is a predominantly industrial north-western suburb of Adelaide, in the City of Port Adelaide Enfield. It is located within the federal Division of Hindmarsh and the state electoral district of Port Adelaide.

== Railway yards ==
Gillman had been the site of railway marshalling yards on the Dry Creek–Port Adelaide railway line. The line was constructed through the area in 1868, leading in to Port Dock railway station. Connections were created from the yard to the industrial and port sidings on the eastern side of the Port River. In 1915, a junction to the south was added called the Rosewater Loop, which connected the Dry Creek line to a new alignment of the Outer Harbor railway line through a new Port Adelaide railway station and bridge over the Port River.

The tracks in the area were converted from broad gauge to dual broad and standard gauge in 1982 as part of the works to convert the Adelaide to Crystal Brook railway to standard gauge.

The Gillman marshalling yards were closed and removed in the early 1990s, leaving the Rosewater Loop as the main line, and a northern branch to sidings on the Port Flats.

In 2008, the Rosewater Loop was closed and the main line branched from the Port Flats branch over the new Mary MacKillop Bridge.

== Multifunction Polis ==
Gillman was intended to be the site of the Multifunction Polis (MFP), a joint project by the Australian and Japanese Governments in the late 1980s and 1990s. Started in 1987 by the Hawke government, the MFP was intended to be a high-tech industry and technology hub with local laws similar to those found in special economic zones around the world today. Protests from the local community and controversy over the proposed partnership with Japan led to the collapse of the project, which later was re-purposed into Technology Park and Mawson Lakes nearby.

== Motorsport ==
Gillman has been the home of Motorcycle Speedway in Adelaide since 1981 when the 280-metre (920 ft) North Arm Speedway opened. The speedway, located on the Grand Trunkway, operated from 1981 until its forced closure in 1997. Since 1998 it has been the home of a larger motorcycle speedway venue, the 300-metre (980 ft) Gillman Speedway located on Wilkins Road.

== Explosives ==
The North Arm Powder Magazine in Gillman was from 1858 to 1906 a secure storage facility for dynamite and gelignite.

== Gillman controversy ==
In June 2013, the Weatherill state government received a proposal from Adelaide Capital Partners (ACP) to purchase 400 hectares (990 acres) of Gillman land for $135 million over three instalments, which was approved in December 2013 and supposed to create 6000 jobs. However, the process was later criticised by the state Opposition and subsequently the Supreme Court of South Australia who ruled the deal "unlawful, irrational and in disregard of commercial principles", but said the contract was valid despite criticising the government's failure to put the land to public tender. A potential High Court action was resolved in an out-of-court deal, with South Australian Attorney General John Rau confirming the parties settled, with the government paying legal costs incurred by all parties, estimated to be no more than $2.2 million. In November 2016, ACP failed to make payment, and the government was forced to pay the Adelaide City Council $20 million for land it purchased as part of the original deal. The government has since sold part of the property to Veolia for use as a waste-to-energy plant, although the vast majority remains in government hands.
