= Gunpowder magazine =

Building used to store gunpowder

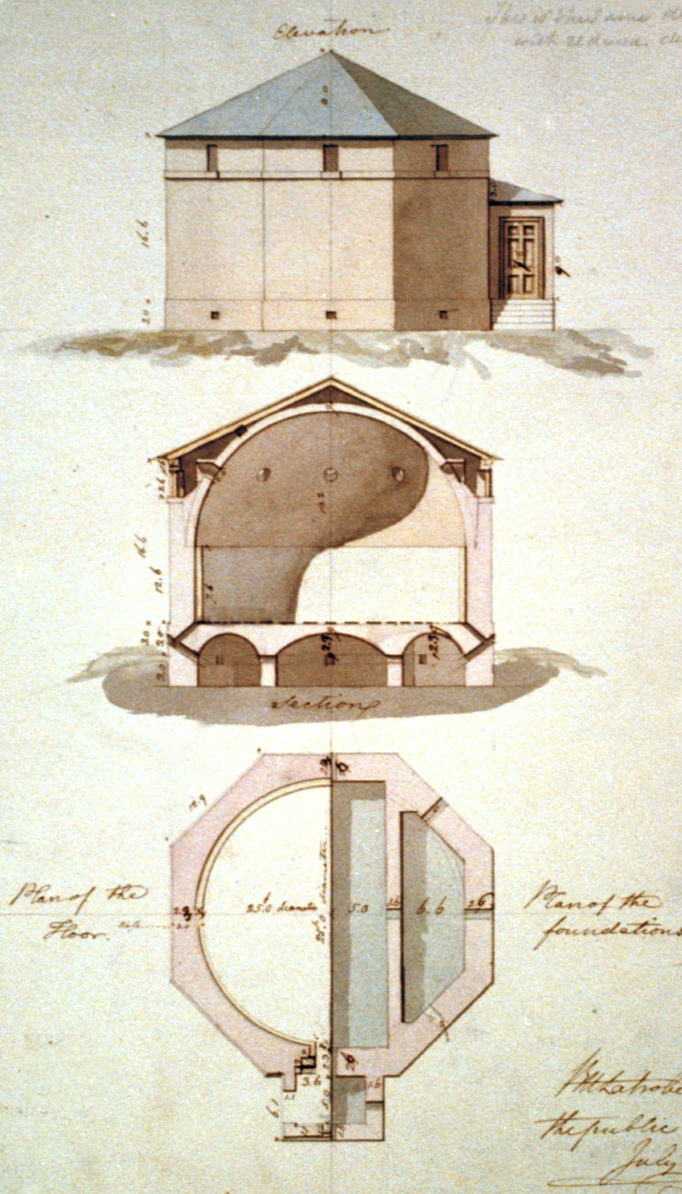
1809 drawing by Benjamin Henry Latrobe showing the elevation, cross-section, and plan of a proposed gunpowder magazine

A gunpowder magazine is a building designed to store the explosive gunpowder in wooden barrels for safety. Gunpowder, until largely superseded, was a universal explosive used in the military and for civil engineering: both applications required storage magazines. Most magazines were purely functional and tended to be in remote and secure locations. They are the successor to the earlier powder towers and powder houses.

== In Australia ==
Historic magazines were at the following locations, among others:

- Jack's Magazine, Saltwater River, Victoria
- Goat Island, Sydney
- Spectacle Island (Port Jackson)
- North Arm Powder Magazine
- Dry Creek explosives depot

== In Canada ==
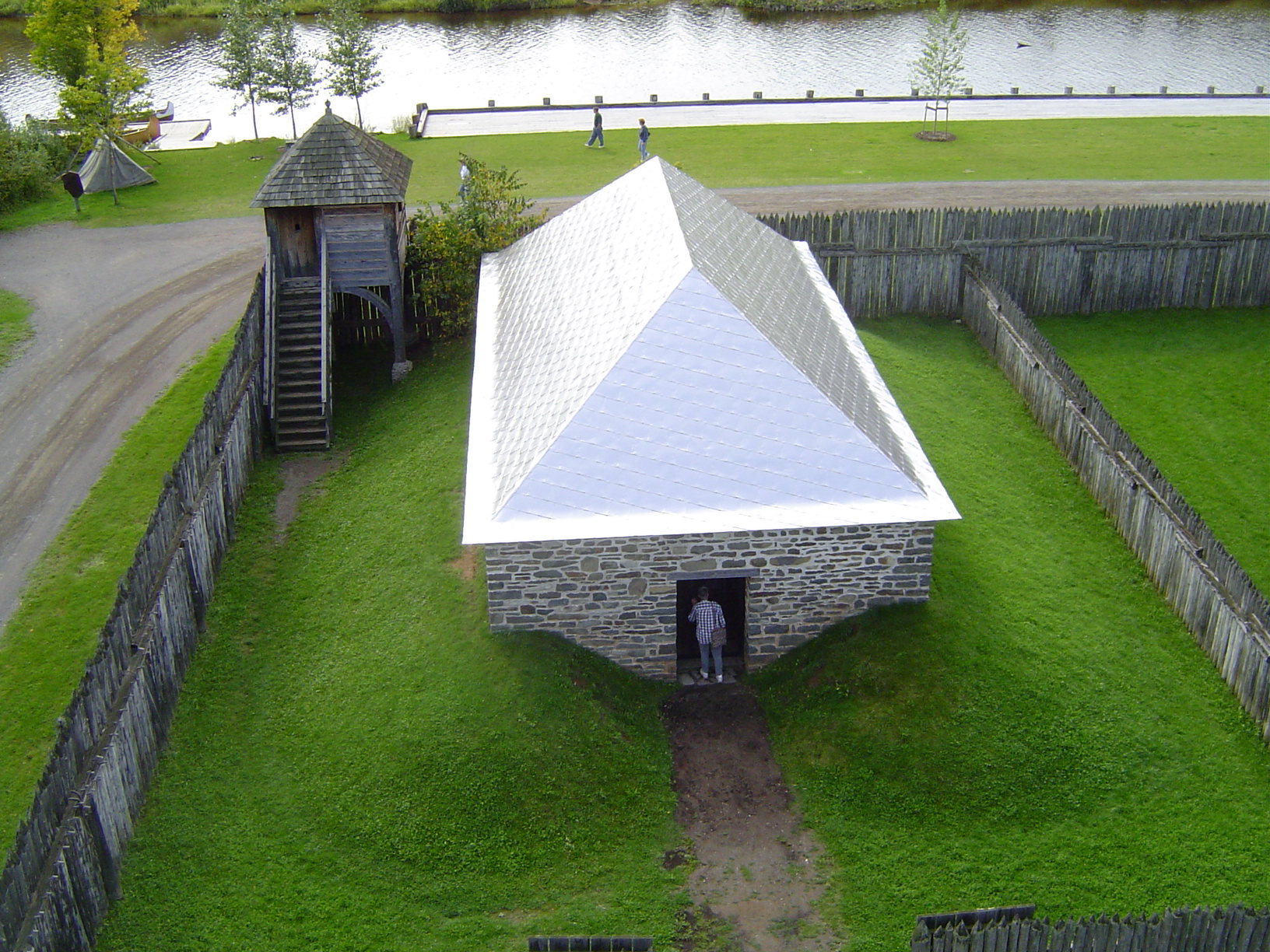
Fort William gunpowder magazine

There are magazines at:

- Citadel Hill (Fort George)
- Citadel of Quebec, Quebec City, Quebec
- Parc de l'Esplanade, Quebec City, Quebec
- Cole Island, Esquimalt, British Columbia
- Fort Lennox, Île-aux-Noix, Quebec
- Fort William Historical Park, Thunder Bay, Ontario
- Fort York, Toronto

== In Ireland ==
=== Ballincollig, County Cork ===
The Ballincollig gunpowder mills were first opened in the late 18th century and were bought, in 1804, by the United Kingdom of Great Britain and Ireland's Board of Ordnance to help defend the Kingdom against attack. They were one of three royal gunpowder factories, but the Ballincollig mills were not used after the end of the Napoleonic Wars. They were sold off by the government in 1832, in a semi-derelict condition, were bought by a Liverpool merchant and reopened to manufacture gunpowder, and finally closed in 1903. Many buildings survive and, together with the associated canals, were incorporated into Ballincollig Regional Park. The site contains a number of powder magazines, as well as expense magazines. (Note: Note: In a gunpowder factory, having several different stages within the manufacturing process, each stage of the process may have its own Expense Magazine, holding perhaps one day's supply of the explosive material they have to process, or enough for just one shift. If the gunpowder factory had a test laboratory, the laboratory may also have its own Expense Magazine.)

The No. 2 magazine was built by the Board of Ordnance and is the oldest magazine. It is 29-foot (8.9 m) long by 28-foot (8.6 m) wide. It has a groin-vaulted roof. The magazine is protected by earthen banks on two sides; with doors at both ends. The No. 1 magazine is newer; and was built sometime after 1828. It is 80-foot (24.5 m) long by 25-foot (7.6 m) wide and has solid walls, but is now roofless.

=== Cork Harbour ===
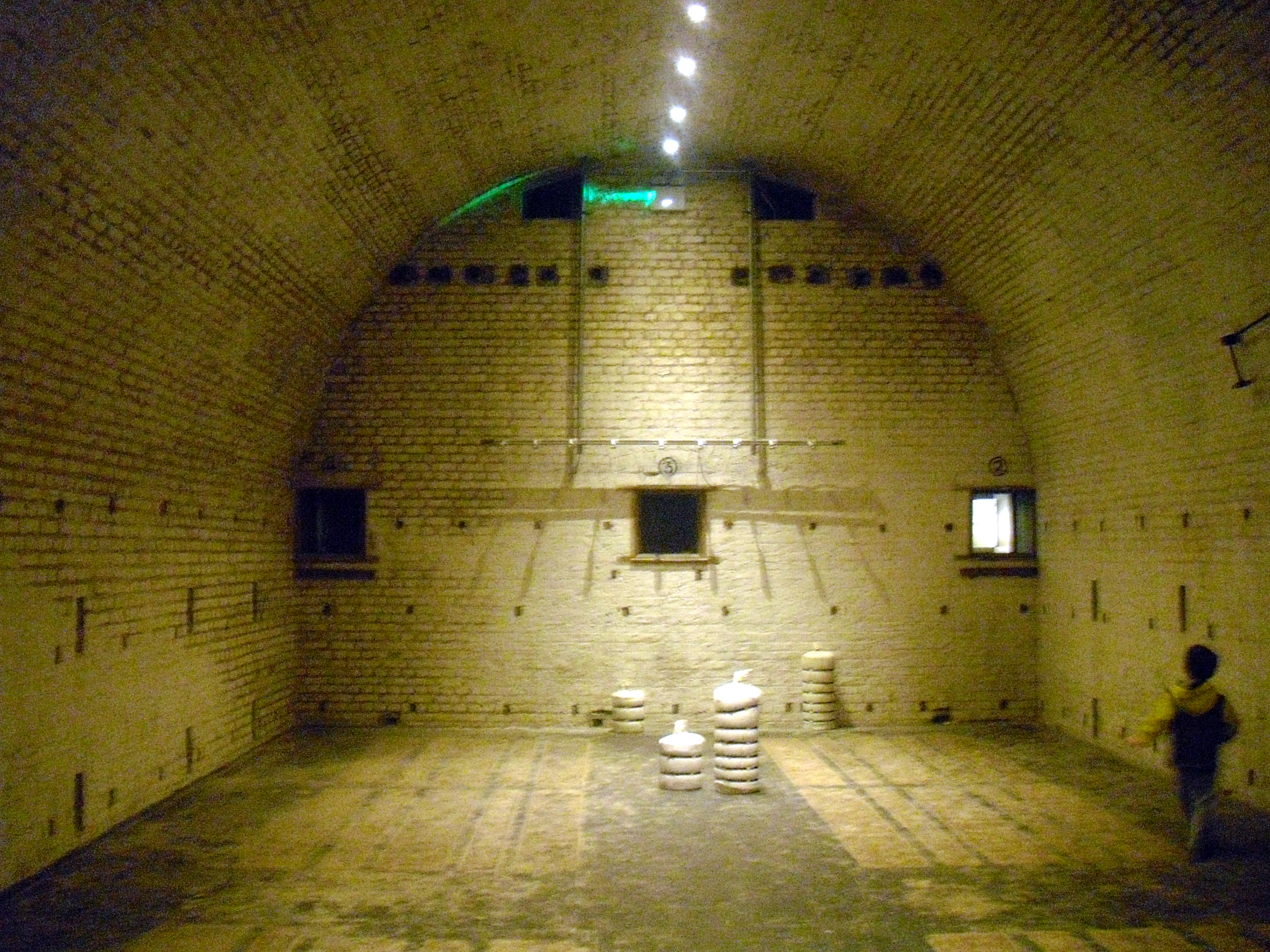
Camden Fort Meagher Magazine

There is a surviving magazine at Camden Fort Meagher, part of the defences of Cork Harbour.

Rocky Island, midway between the mainland and Haulbowline Island (which at the time was an ordnance depot), is dominated by a magazine complex dating from 1808; it held up to 25,000 barrels, and was the principal store for the whole of Ireland. In 2007 it was restored and converted into Ireland's first crematorium outside Dublin.

== In Malta ==
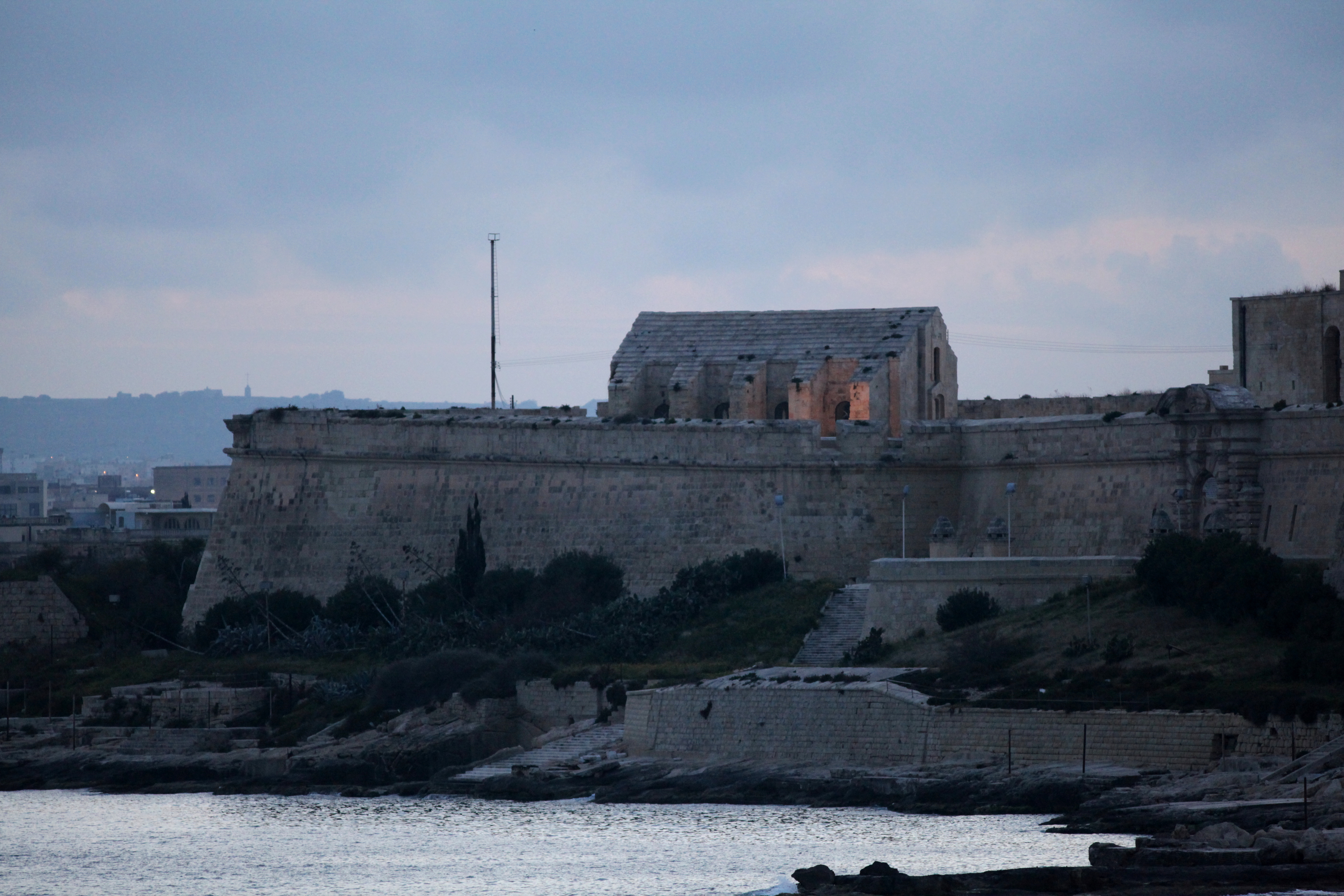
Gunpowder magazine on St Helen's Bastion at Fort Manoel

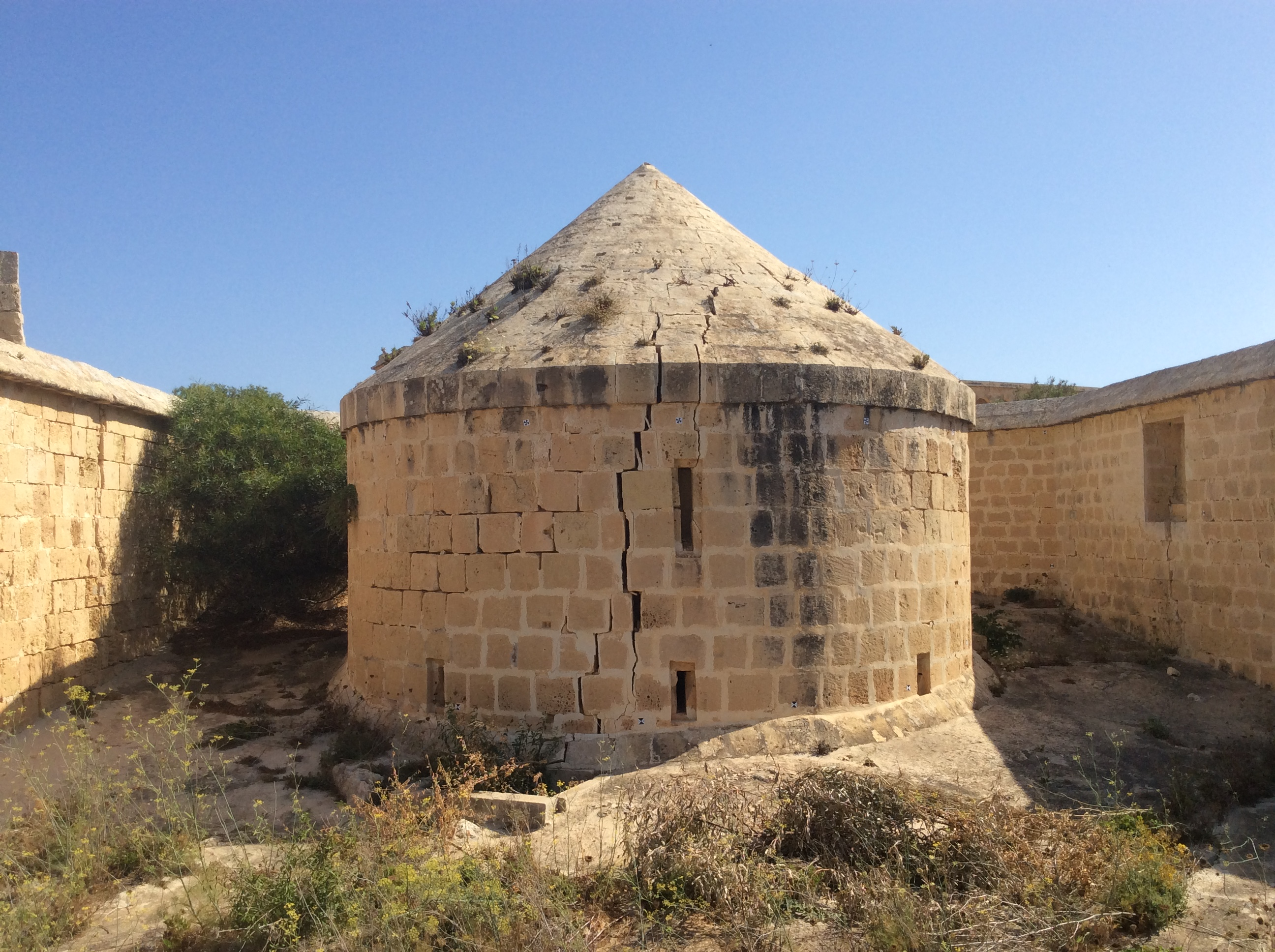
Gunpowder magazine on Guardian Angel Bastion at Fort Chambray

The Order of Saint John built a number of gunpowder magazines in Malta during their rule of the islands. Until the end of the sixteenth century, echauguettes were used to store gunpowder. The Order built a magazine in Valletta, but it exploded in 1634, killing 22 people. After the explosion, a new magazine was built, in sparsely populated Floriana to avoid another disaster. Various other magazines were built over the years whose designs were influenced by French military architecture, particularly the style of Vauban. The British, who took over Malta in 1800, also built a number of magazines on the islands.

Gunpowder magazines in Malta include:

- Cittadella: A gunpowder magazine was built on St. John Demi-Bastion sometime between the 1620s and 1693. Two other magazines were built on St. Martin Cavalier and St. John Cavalier in 1701. The magazines at St. John Demi-Bastion and St. John Cavalier are still intact, while the one on St. Martin Cavalier collapsed in the nineteenth century.
- Fort St. Angelo: A magazine was built within the fort sometime after 1690, possibly on the site of an older gunpowder factory. It still exists with some modifications made by the British.
- Mdina: A magazine on De Redin Bastion was proposed in the 1720s, but it was never built.
- Fort Manoel: Two magazines were built in 1727–29 on St Helen's Bastion and St Anthony's Bastion. The latter was demolished in 1872 to make way for gun emplacements, but the one on St Helen's Bastion still survives and was restored in 2004. The British built smaller magazines in the fort as well.
- Fort St. Elmo: A magazine was built in Vendôme Bastion in 1745, and it was converted into an armoury in the 19th century. Until 2014 it housed the National War Museum.
- Ras Ħanżir: A magazine was built in 1756 outside the fortified settlements for safety. It still exists, although it was altered by the British when it was incorporated into the Corradino Lines.
- Fort Chambray: A magazine was built in around 1760 on Guardian Angel Bastion. It has an oval shape and a conical roof, and it is still standing.
- Cottonera Lines: Magazines were built on some of the bastions.
- Fort Ricasoli: The fort's magazine was blown up during the Froberg mutiny in 1807. The British built a new magazine to replace it in 1829. Other smaller magazines were also built by the British within the fort.

Some of the coastal fortifications also had their own magazines or storage areas.

== In the Netherlands ==
Three gunpowder magazines remain in the Netherlands: the Kruithuis in Delft, the Kruithuis in Den Bosch (the oldest, built in 1618–1620), and one in Wierickerschans.

== In Persia ==
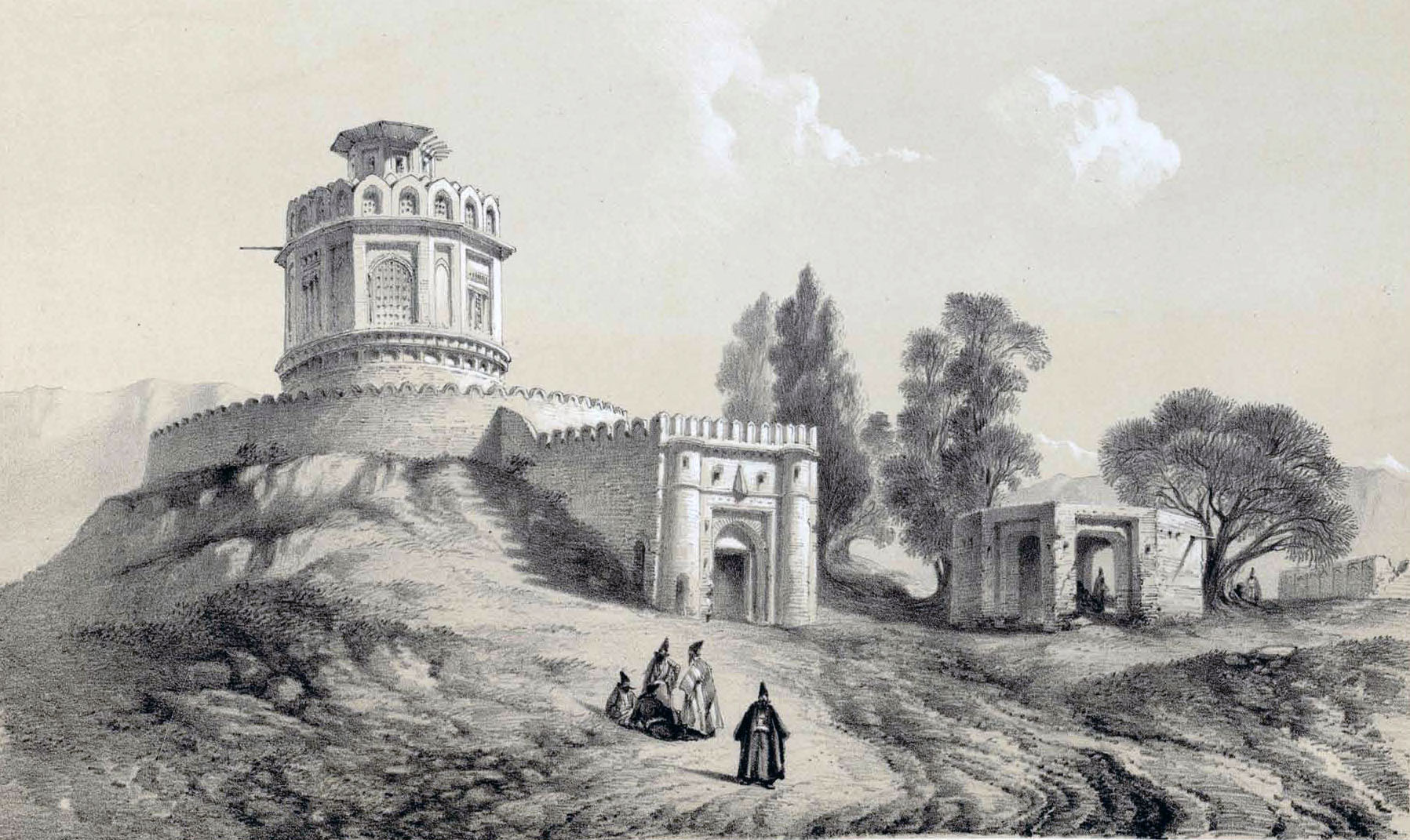
A drawing of the Barout khaneh, a powder tower in Tehran, by Eugène Flandin, 1840

Gunpowder magazines were called Bārūt-Khāneh (Persian: باروتخانه, or باروطخانه) in Persia (Iran).

Gunpowder Manufacturing of Yusef Abad (باروت سازی یوسف آباد), and later the Gunpowder Magazine of Tehran (باروتخانه تهران Bārūt-Khāneh-ye Tehrān), was a gunpowder magazine near Tehran which was built during the Qajar dynasty. Nothing remains of this building today, and its exact location is unknown.

== In Singapore ==
- The Battle Box at Fort Canning
- Fort Sentosa
- Fort Siloso
- Fort Tanjong Katong

== In South Africa ==
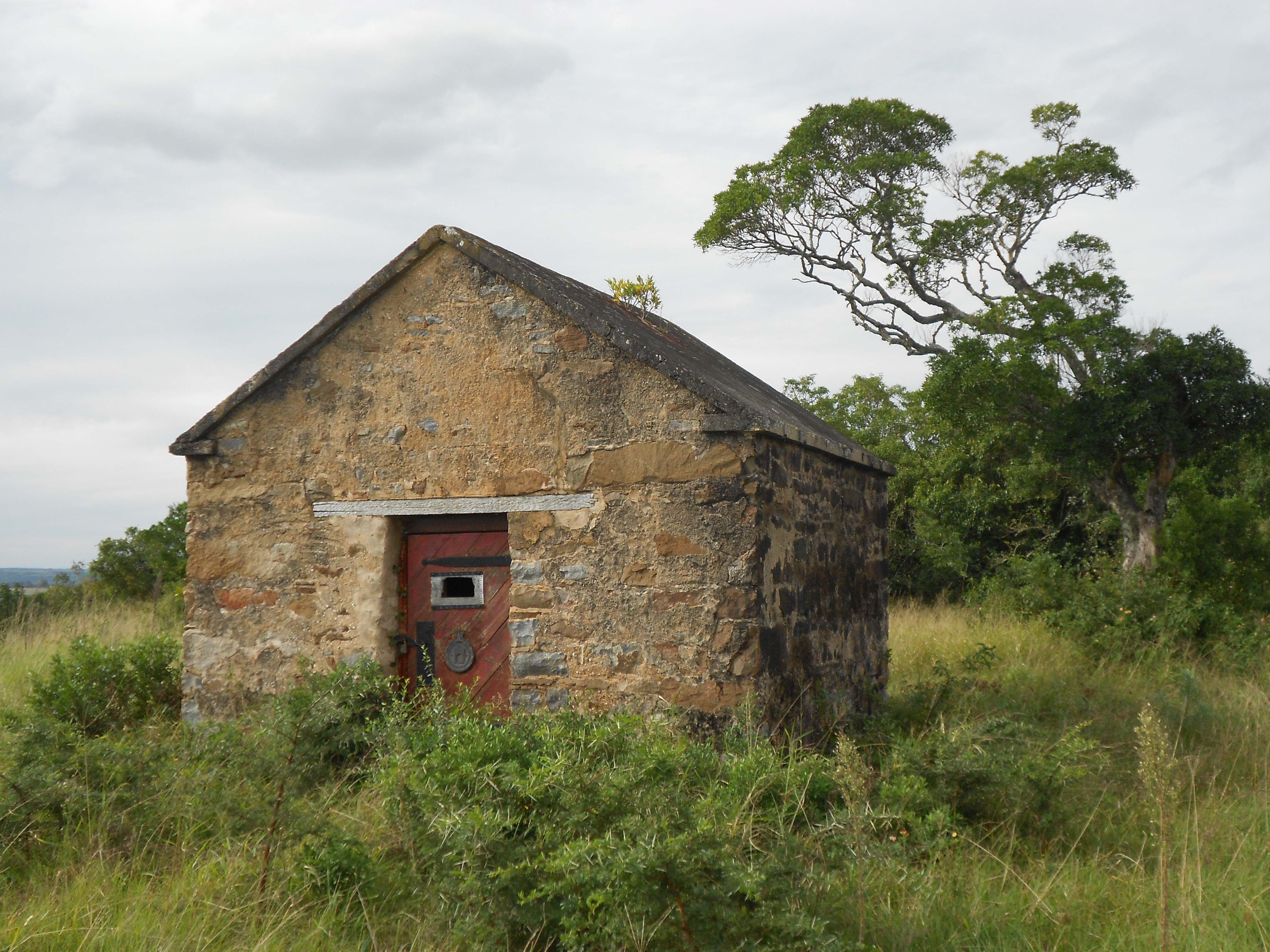
Bathurst Old Powder Magazine

A magazine was erected in Bathurst, East Cape, by the British military in 1821; it is still standing. It usually carried about 273 kg gunpowder, 7,000 ball cartridges and 60 rifles as stock. In 1870 the British military built a powder magazine in the Northern Cape town of Fraserburg (also still standing) in case of war with the neighbouring Griqua people; it was used in the Anglo-Boer War.

== In Turkey ==
Gunpowder magazines were called Baruthâne in Turkish. In the Ottoman Empire some magazines were built in Istanbul, Gallipoli and Saloniki. Bakırköy gunpowder magazine, built in 1700, is the only one remaining.

== In the United Kingdom ==
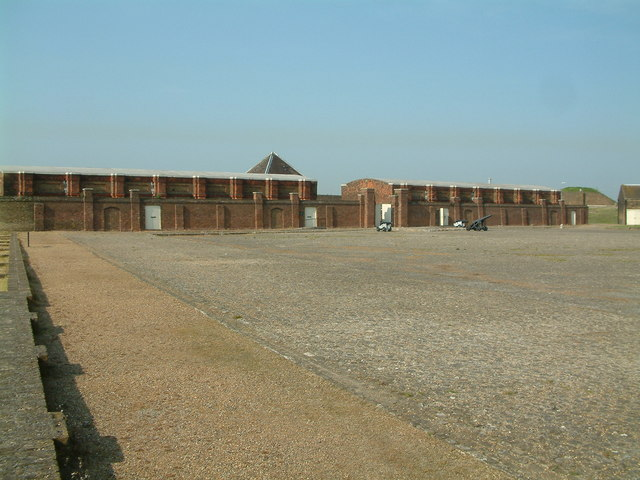
Tilbury: a unique pair of early 18th-century magazines within the fort

Production of gunpowder in England appears to have started in the mid-14th century with the aim of supplying The Crown. Records show that gunpowder was being made in 1346 at the Tower of London; there was a powder house at the Tower in 1461. Gunpowder was also being made or stored at other royal residences such as Greenwich Palace, where the royal armouries were based. It was also stored in Scotland, in royal castles such as Edinburgh Castle. Gunpowder manufacture at Faversham began as a private enterprise in the 16th century.

From the 18th century, efforts began to be made to site magazines away from inhabited areas. Nevertheless, storage at the older established sites persisted well into the 19th century.

The use of gunpowder for both military and civil engineering purposes began to be superseded by newer nitrogen-based explosives from the later 19th century. Gunpowder production in the United Kingdom was gradually phased out during the mid-20th century. The last remaining gunpowder mill at the Royal Gunpowder Factory, Waltham Abbey was damaged by a German parachute mine in 1941; it never reopened. This was followed by the closure of the gunpowder section at the Royal Ordnance Factory ROF Chorley; the section was closed and demolished at the end of World War II. ICI Nobel's Roslin gunpowder factory closed in 1954. The sole United Kingdom gunpowder factory left was ICI Nobel's Ardeer site in North Ayrshire, Scotland, which closed in October 1976. Since then gunpowder needed in the United Kingdom has been imported.

Gunpowder magazines survive at several locations in the UK. In many cases the gunpowder was stored in locations which were both remote from habitations and could be made secure. They were also often sited in dense woodland, or had trees planted around them, as a way of lessening the effect of any explosion.

=== England ===
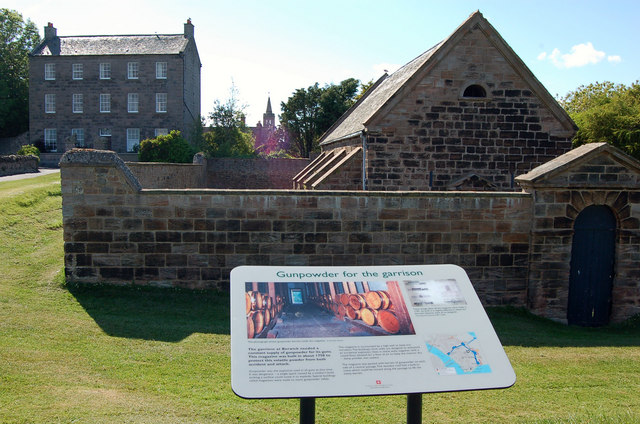
Gunpowder magazine, Berwick

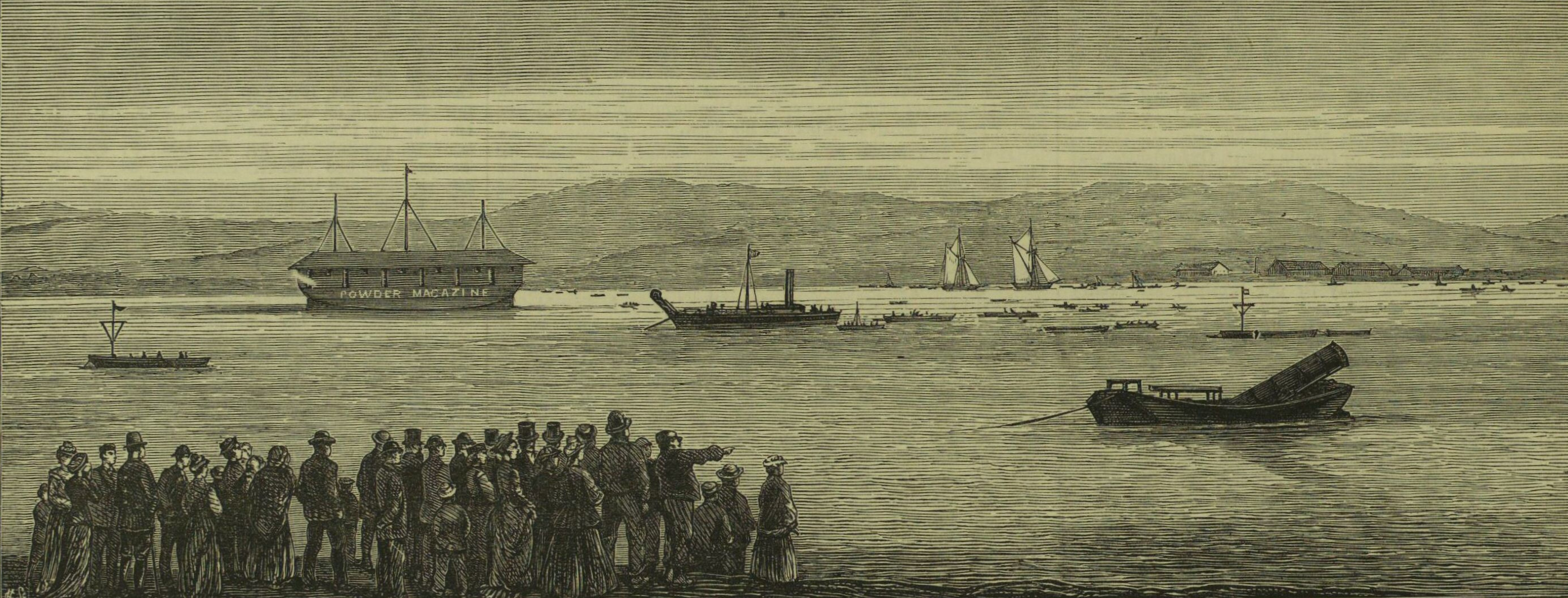
HMS Talbot at Beckton, London

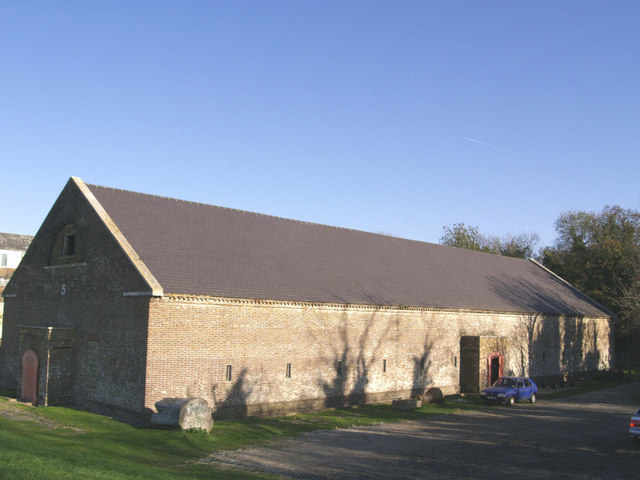
Royal Gunpowder Magazine No. 5, Purfleet, Essex

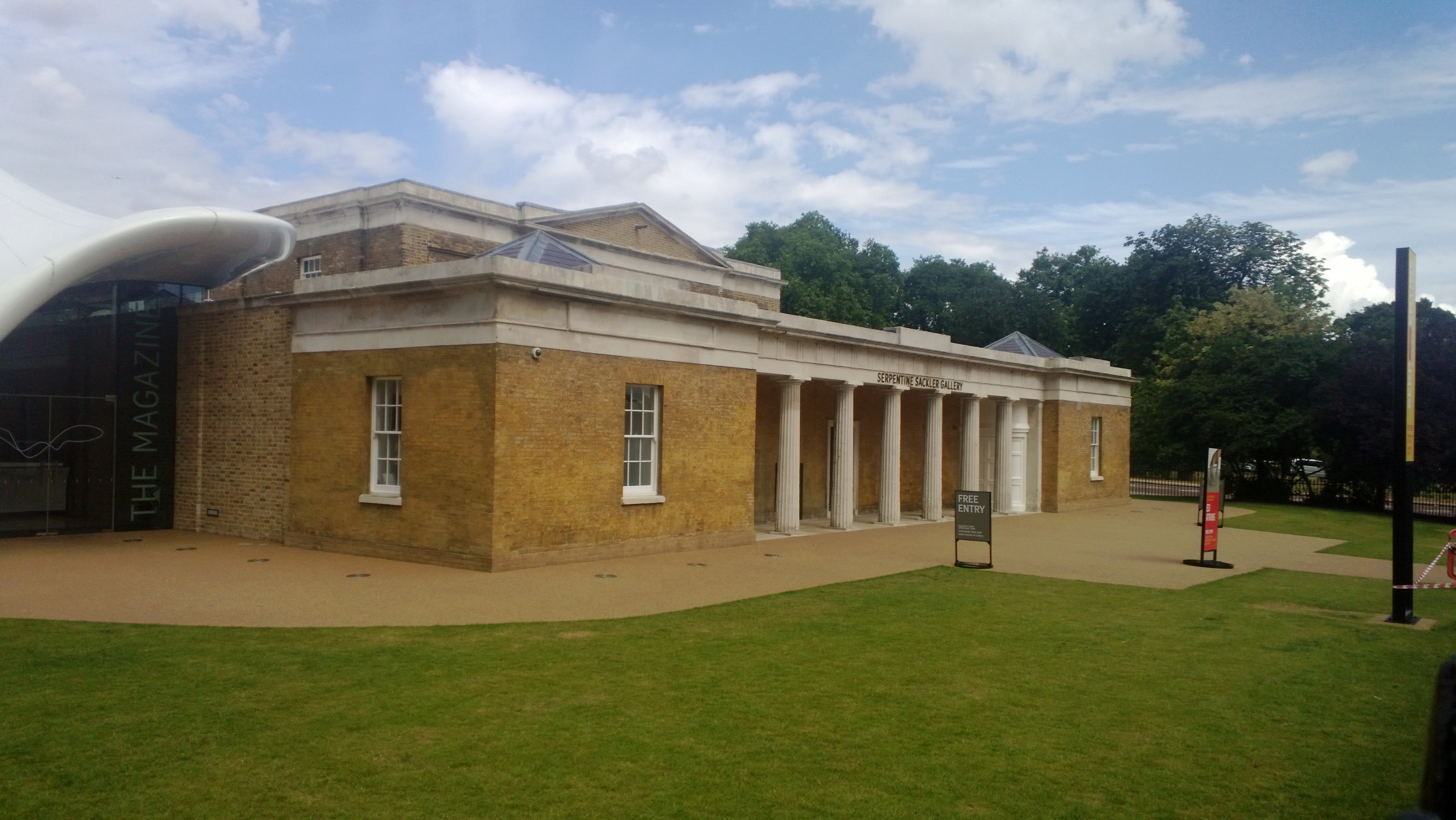
The Magazine, Hyde Park

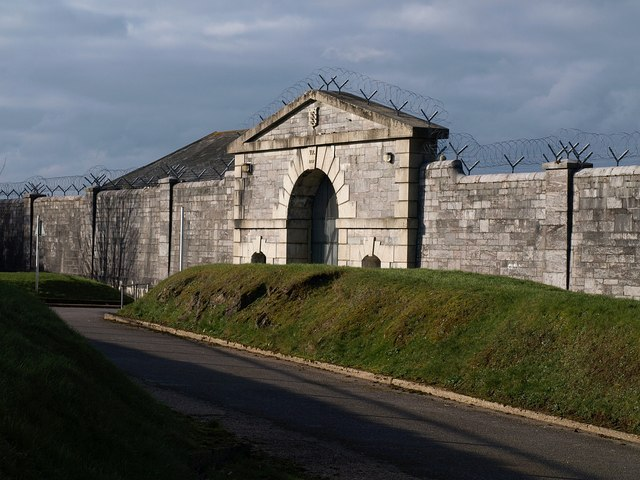
Bull Point Barracks Gatehouse

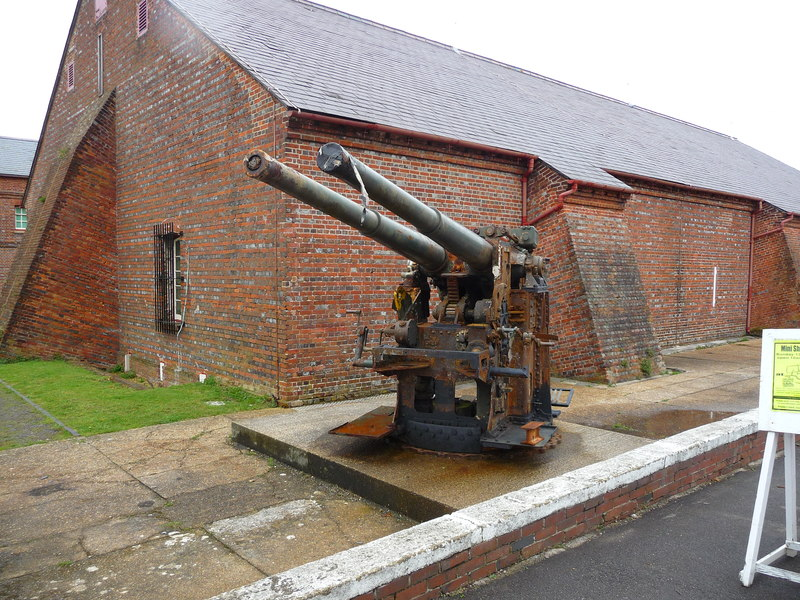
The 18th-century 'A' Magazine at Priddy's Hard

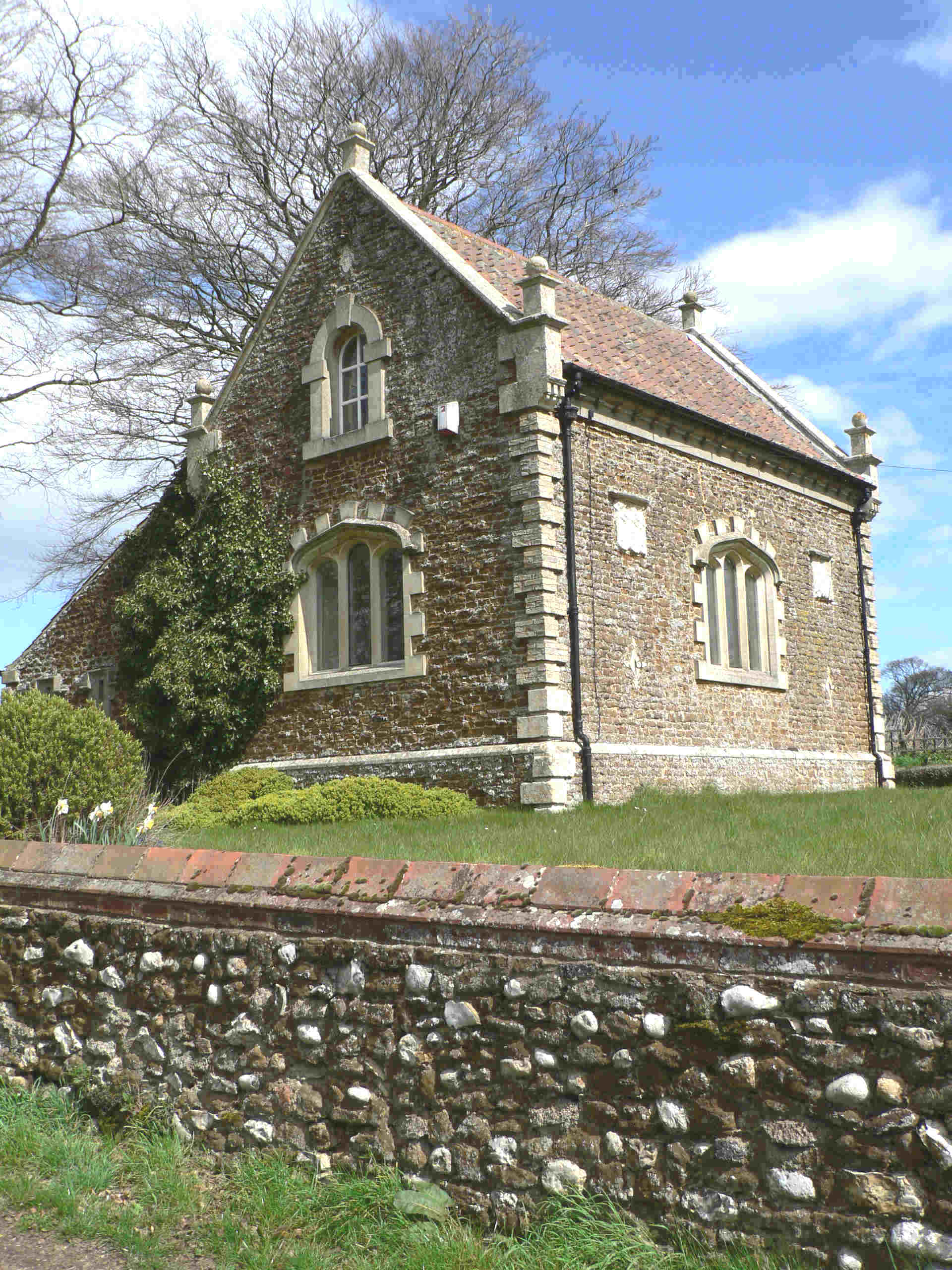
Magazine, the old gunpowder store at Sedgeford

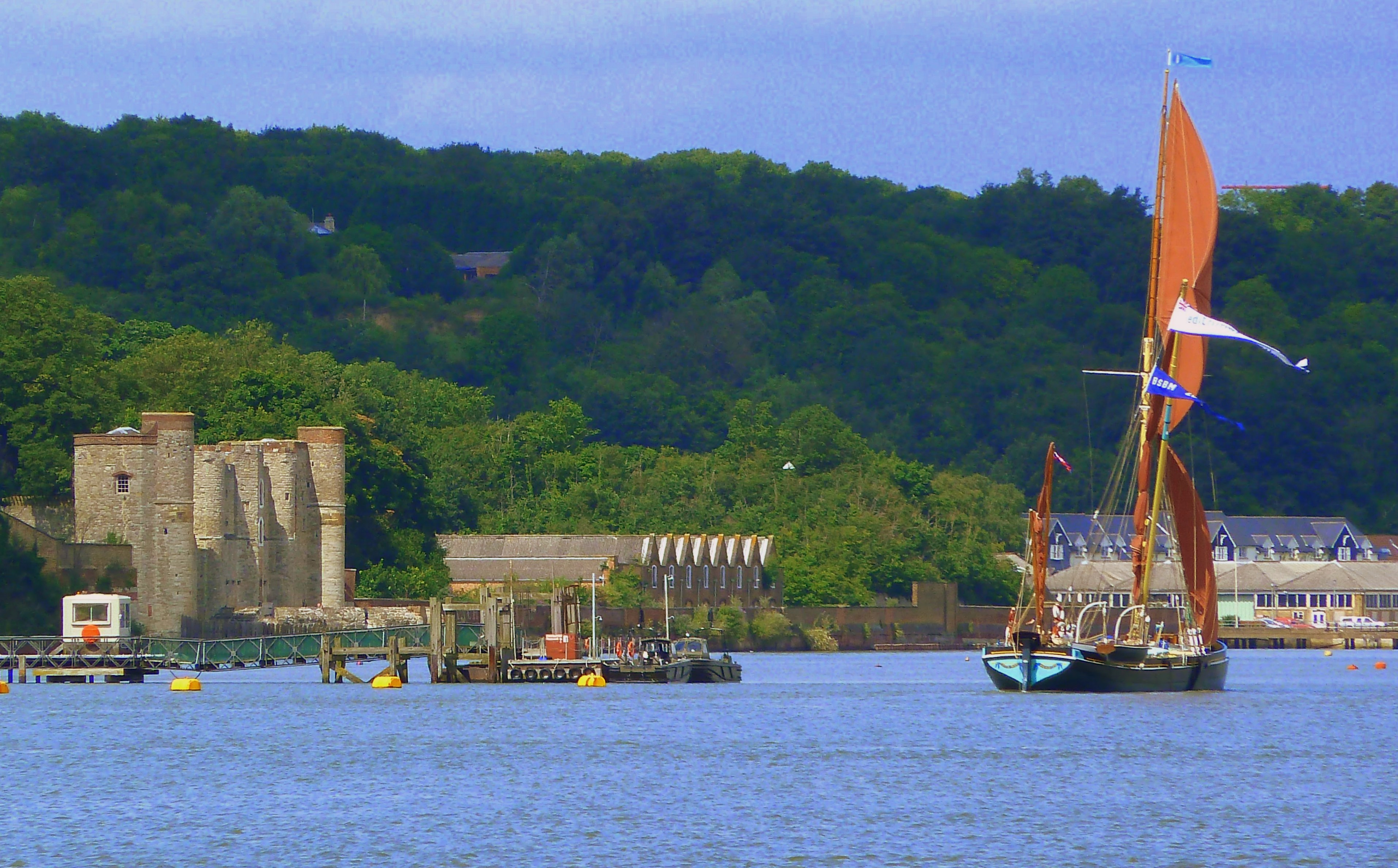
Magazine of 1857 (centre) alongside Upnor Castle (left)

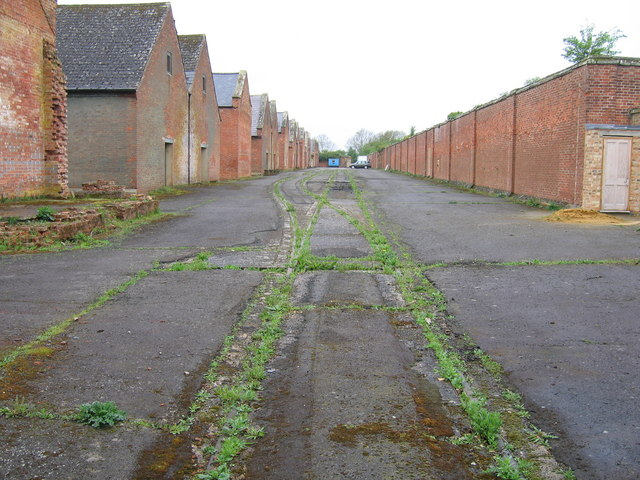
Alternating magazine and traverse buildings (left) inside the boundary wall (right) at Weedon Bec

The Gunpowder Magazine in Berwick-upon-Tweed was built in 1745 to service Berwick Barracks and sited at a safe distance from them to the south. It is a solid stone building, heavily buttressed, windowless, stone roofed and enclosed by a stone wall. Along with Purfleet and Tilbury it is one of the few surviving eighteenth-century gunpowder magazines in the country.

Brean Down Fort was one of a number of Palmerston Forts built to defend the British, Irish and Channel Island coastlines. It was originally built in stages between 1862 and 1870; to protect the Bristol Channel. It had a large, underground, main gunpowder magazine, 15-foot (4.5 m) by 18-foot (5.5 m) by 20-foot (6.1 m) high, built to the recommendations of the 1863 Royal Commission. The magazine still exists. A further two, smaller, underground magazines, No. 2 magazine and No. 3 magazine, were also built. No. 3 magazine exploded on 3 July 1900 destroying most of the barracks. Gunner Hains was killed. It was concluded that he had killed himself by firing a ball cartridge down a ventilator shaft into the magazine, which held 3 tons (3 tonnes) of gunpowder, causing the magazine to explode. The fort was reused in both the First and Second World Wars; and additional expense magazines constructed. (Note: Note: In the case of a fort or a gun emplacement, an Expense Magazine, is a magazine holding a small number of rounds, or bags of gunpowder for immediate use. It might be sited near to a large gun, so that the firing team can quickly reload the gun without having to go the main magazine.) The fort is now owned by the National Trust.

As early as 1461, the Tower of London included a 'powderhous' within its walls. With the establishment of the Board of Ordnance there, its use as a gunpowder store increased. In the Tudor period the White Tower was refitted for this purpose, and by 1657 the entire building, apart from the chapel, was being used to store gunpowder. Gunpowder was still being stored there when the Ordnance Board was disbanded in the mid-nineteenth century.

HMS Talbot was moored in the Thames at Beckton as a powder magazine in the late 19th century.

The Board of Ordnance maintained magazines at both Tilbury Fort and New Tavern Fort, which face each other across the River Thames. Two sizeable magazines of 1716 remain in place at Tilbury.

Purfleet Royal Gunpowder Magazine was established by Act of Parliament in 1760, built to the design of James Gabriel Montresor and opened in 1765, with a garrison in place to protect it. Previously, gunpowder had been stored on Greenwich Peninsula, but fears of an explosion there prompted the building of this new establishment further afield. The purpose of the Purfleet magazine was to store newly manufactured gunpowder.

The Purfleet site was centred on five large magazines, each capable of holding up to 10,400 barrels of gunpowder. These substantial brick-built sheds were windowless, with copper-lined doors and sand-filled roof voids – all designed to prevent (or mitigate the effects of) an explosion. By the end of the eighteenth century, Purfleet was receiving regular consignments of powder from Waltham Abbey, to provide both the Navy and the Army with supplies. The Ministry of Defence finally closed and sold the site in 1962, and several buildings were demolished to make way for a new housing estate. Some significant original buildings remain, however: the clock tower, the proofing house (in which samples of new consignments were tested) and one magazine, No. 5, which has been designated a Scheduled Ancient Monument and now houses the Purfleet Heritage and Military Centre, a vast collection of local and military memorabilia open to the public. According to English Heritage, it represents (along with the magazine at Priddy's Hard in Gosport) "the most outstanding example of a typically British type of magazine, with twin barrel vaults, that relates to a critical period in Britain's growth as a naval power in the decades after the Seven Years' War." Inside, a good number of original features have survived, including some unique wooden overhead cranes, early forerunners of the gantry crane.

A sizeable magazine stands in the unexpected surroundings of London's Hyde Park. Opened by the Board of Ordnance in 1805, its structure is similar to other British magazines of this period except that the exterior is more ornamented than elsewhere, probably in deference to its setting, with a Palladian style portico and other features. The magazine provided the army with a stock of gunpowder in the capital, in case of 'foreign invasion or popular uprising'. It remained in MOD hands until 1963, after which it served as a storage facility. In 2013 it was refurbished and extended by Dame Zaha Hadid, as the Serpentine Sackler Gallery.

In Plymouth the Board of Ordnance set up Powder Magazines to serve the fleet and defences of Devonport Dockyard initially at the Royal Citadel, later supplemented by a small magazine at the New Gun Wharf (Morice Yard) in 1720; but space was limited and people were living close by, so the Board sought a new, more isolated spot for its Magazines. They first settled on a site at Keyham Point (just north of Morice Yard) in 1775; but with that land required for an expansion of the Dockyard in the mid-19th century a new site was acquired further to the north, at Bull Point.

A magazine of 1744 survives in situ at Morice Yard, which today forms part of HMNB Devonport. Built to replace the earlier small magazine, which stood at the centre of the site, this is Britain's oldest surviving naval ordnance magazine.

The Royal Navy Ordnance Base (later RNAD) Bull Point was the last great work of the Board of Ordnance before its disbandment in 1856. Bull Point was and is unusual in the unity and precise purpose of its design: rather than developing gradually over time, it was planned as a whole, and with a particular view to meeting the storage needs of emerging new types of artillery. Four Magazines were built (1851–54) each holding 10,000 barrels. These were followed by a series of other buildings specifically designed for particular uses. From the start the site was fully integrated with the adjacent St Budeaux Royal Powder Works on Kinterbury Creek established in 1805, where damaged powder was treated before being passed on to Bull Point for storage.

The buildings are mostly still in place within the MOD Bull Point RNAD site: all of one style, mostly ashlar with rock-faced dressings; they are said by English Heritage to comprise "both the finest ensemble in any of the Ordnance Yards and a remarkable example of integrated factory planning of the period".

Building work on the Square Tower, Portsmouth, started in 1494; and from the end of the 16th century until 1779 it was used as a powder magazine, with a capacity of 12,000 barrels of gunpowder.

The inhabitants of Portsmouth petitioned the Master General of the Ordnance in 1716 to remove the gunpowder, as they were worried about the hazards it posed to the town, but nothing was done at that time. A further petition was sent to the Board of Ordnance in 1767 following an explosion which caused extensive damage. This led to the construction of the Priddy's Hard magazine at Gosport (see below), in a remote area, across the water from Portsmouth.

The Square Tower still exists. After 1779 it was used for other purposes; including employment as a semaphore station in 1817.

Priddy's Hard was originally a fort; in 1768 King George III authorised the construction of a gunpowder magazine inside the ramparts to avoid having to store gunpowder in the Square Tower, Portsmouth. Construction began in 1771, and the magazine was in use by 1777. A cooperage and shifting house were built alongside at the same time, together with a 'rolling way' for moving gunpowder barrels between the magazine and a nearby wharf; together with the Magazine they are all Grade I listed structures.

Both the fort and the magazine came under the control of the Board of Ordnance until 1855, with control passing to the War Office, and then to the Admiralty in 1891. Priddy's Hard became a Naval Armaments Depot, finally closing in 1977. The magazine now forms part of the Explosion! Museum of Naval Firepower.

In the 1780s the Duke of Richmond, Master General of the Ordnance, began to implement a policy of dividing gunpowder stored at the principal coastal locations, and storing it across several sites in the vicinity to make it less vulnerable to a targeted attack. At Portsmouth, this led to the building of a new magazine at Tipner Point in 1796–8. A second magazine was added in 1856 (part of a policy of expansion following the Crimean War); both still stand flanked by two buildings, the former cooperage and the shifting house, which, along with the magazines, are listed buildings. The magazines remained in use until the 1950s. The surrounding land is earmarked for future redevelopment as part of the Tipner Regeneration scheme.

Another magazine depot for Portsmouth was established at Marchwood, where three magazines were built in 1814–16 to an innovative design by Sir William Congreve. Movement of gunpowder barrels within the complex was by canal. Four more magazines were added in 1856, and by 1864 Marchwood was Britain's largest magazine complex with capacity for 76,000 barrels.

Two magazines have survived, one of 1814–16 and one of 1856, along with some ancillary buildings, one of which is now home to Marchwood Yacht Club. None of the other magazines has survived, mainly due to the damage that was sustained across the site during The Blitz. The depot closed in 1961; the site is now primarily a residential area.

Magazine Cottage in Sedgeford was built during the 17th century by the Le Strange Family as a gunpowder store during the English Civil War. It is now a residential house and a landmark for the many walkers of the ancient Roman road Peddars Way; it is said that a secret passageway led from the house to the coast.

In 1668, following the Dutch raid on the Medway, Upnor Castle was reassigned from serving as an artillery fort to be 'a Place of Store and Magazine'. Thenceforward, barrels of gunpowder were transferred to Upnor, primarily from the Tower of London. The castle was recognized as unsuitable for this role as early as 1808 when a new magazine (since demolished) was built on an adjacent site; another, of similar design, was added in 1857. The latter, which still stands, is described as 'a particularly fine magazine building of the 1850s, distinguished by its historicist style' and 'the most impressive example of a magazine using the catenary arch system'.

In 1877, five more new magazines were built inland at Chattenden (the two sites being linked by a railway). Still more magazines were built close by at Lodge Hill, from 1898, primarily for storing the recently developed explosive cordite. Upnor, Chattenden and Lodge Hill depots remained in military ownership until the mid-2010s, when the MOD sold the land for housing and commercial use.

Gunpowder magazines still survive at the Waltham Abbey Royal Gunpowder Mills, including its Grand Magazine, first constructed in 1804 and rebuilt in 1867–68.

The former Ordnance Depot at Weedon Bec includes four magazines dating from 1806 to 1810, along with another built in 1857. The magazines stand in their own compound apart from the main storehouses within a containing wall. Each magazine is separated from its neighbour by an earth-filled 'traverse' building, designed to absorb the impact of an explosion – the first time large magazines had been provided with traverses. Like all the main buildings at Weedon, the magazines lie along the bank of a branch of the Grand Union Canal for ease of transport. In 1827 the four magazines contained 10,500 barrels of powder, along with 1,463,700 ball and 693,746 blank cartridges.

The hexagonal Old Powder Magazine still stands near the ruins of the Charles Bathurst Smelt Mill in Arkengarthdale, North Yorkshire. It stored gunpowder for use in the numerous lead workings in the area and was last used as a candle factory. All lead working in the dale ceased around 1911.

=== Scotland ===
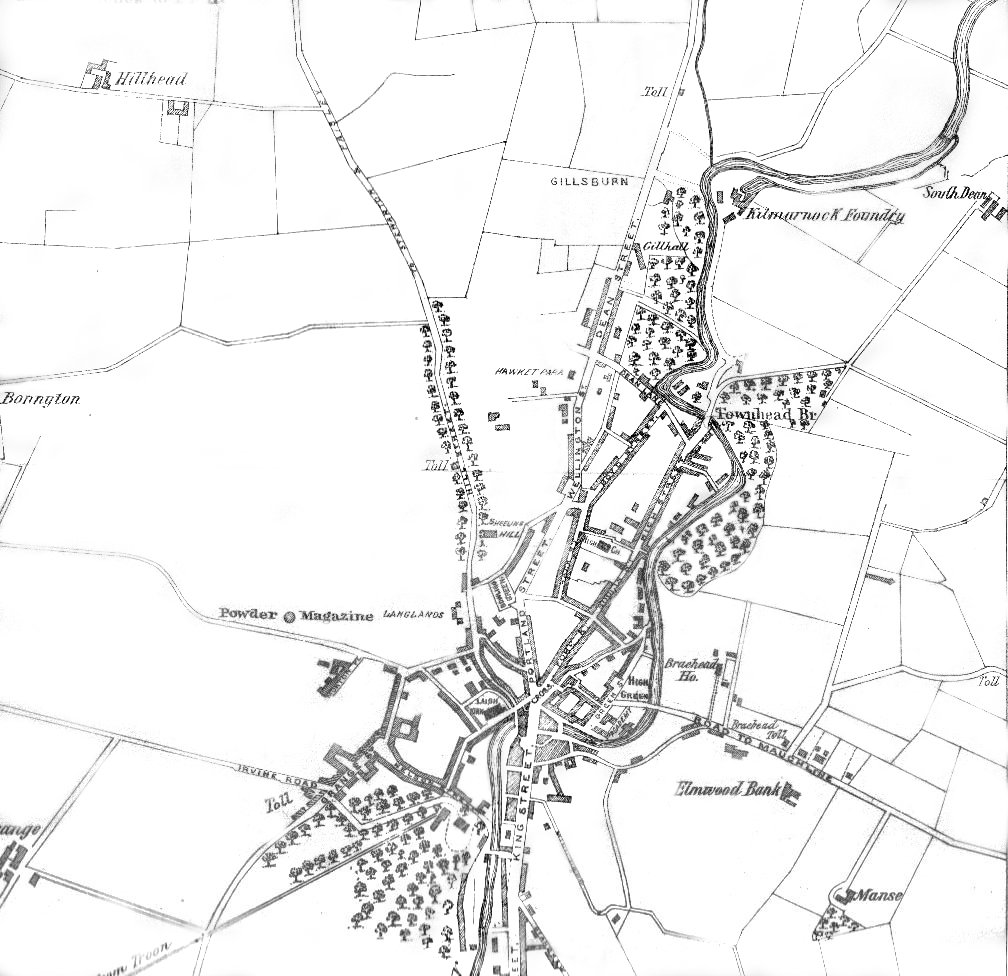
The remote situation of a gunpowder magazine near Kilmarnock in 1819. It had gone by 1880 because of the expansion of the town.

Irvine circa 1870. The Old parish kirk, manse and gunpowder magazine are prominent on the right bank of the river.

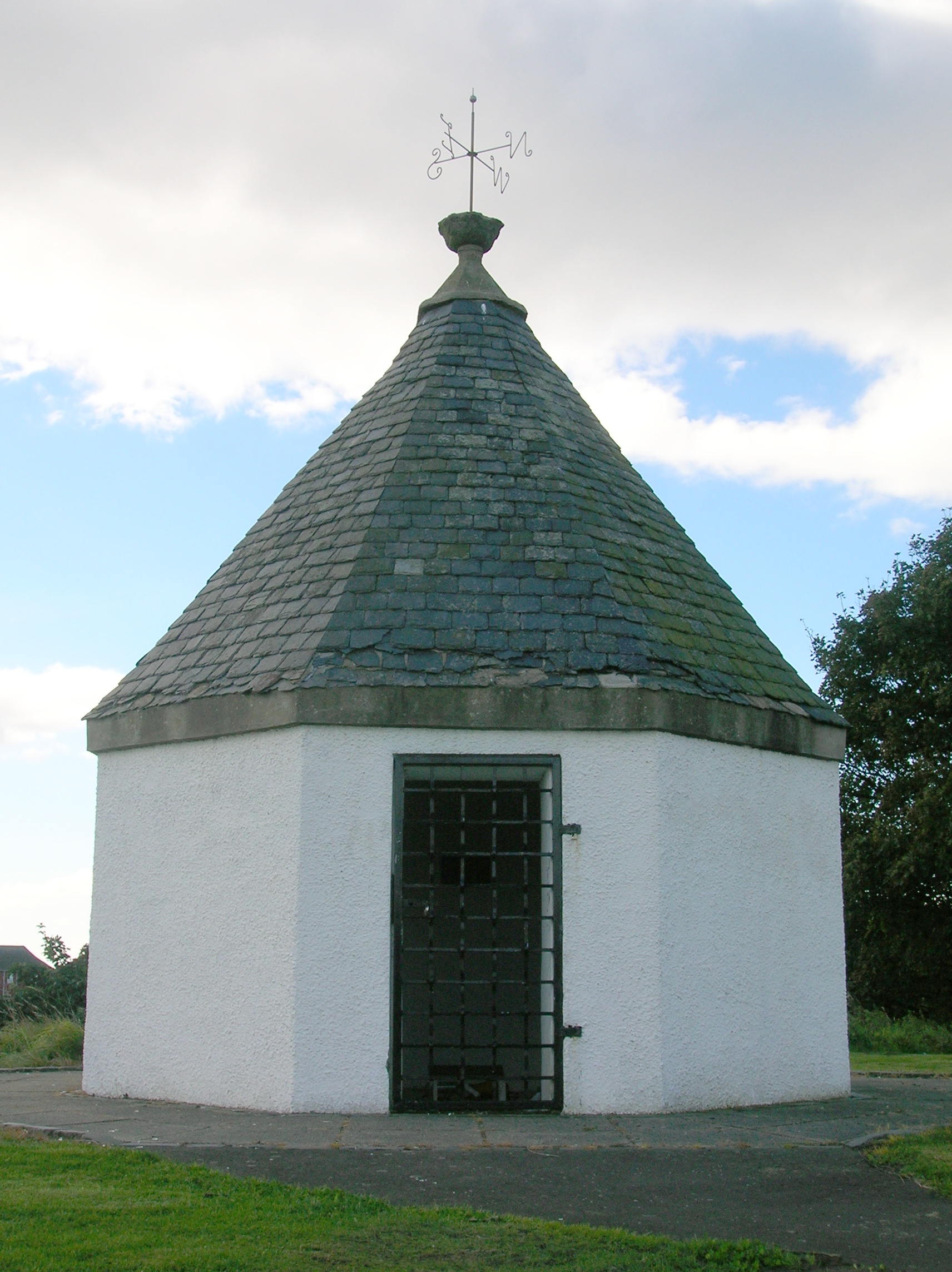
The old Powder or Pouther magazine at Irvine dating from 1642.

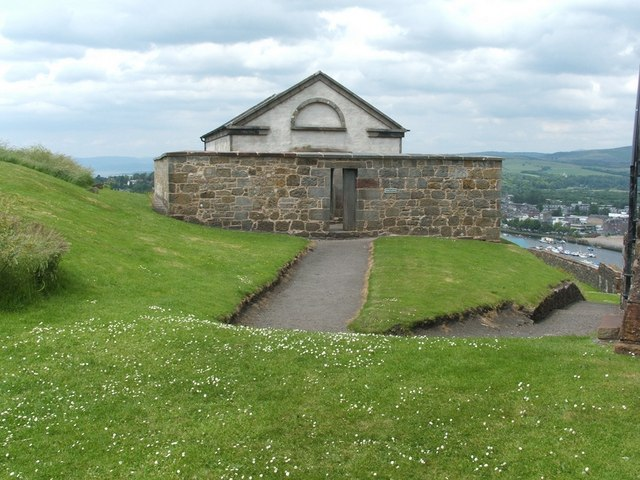
Dumbarton Castle magazine

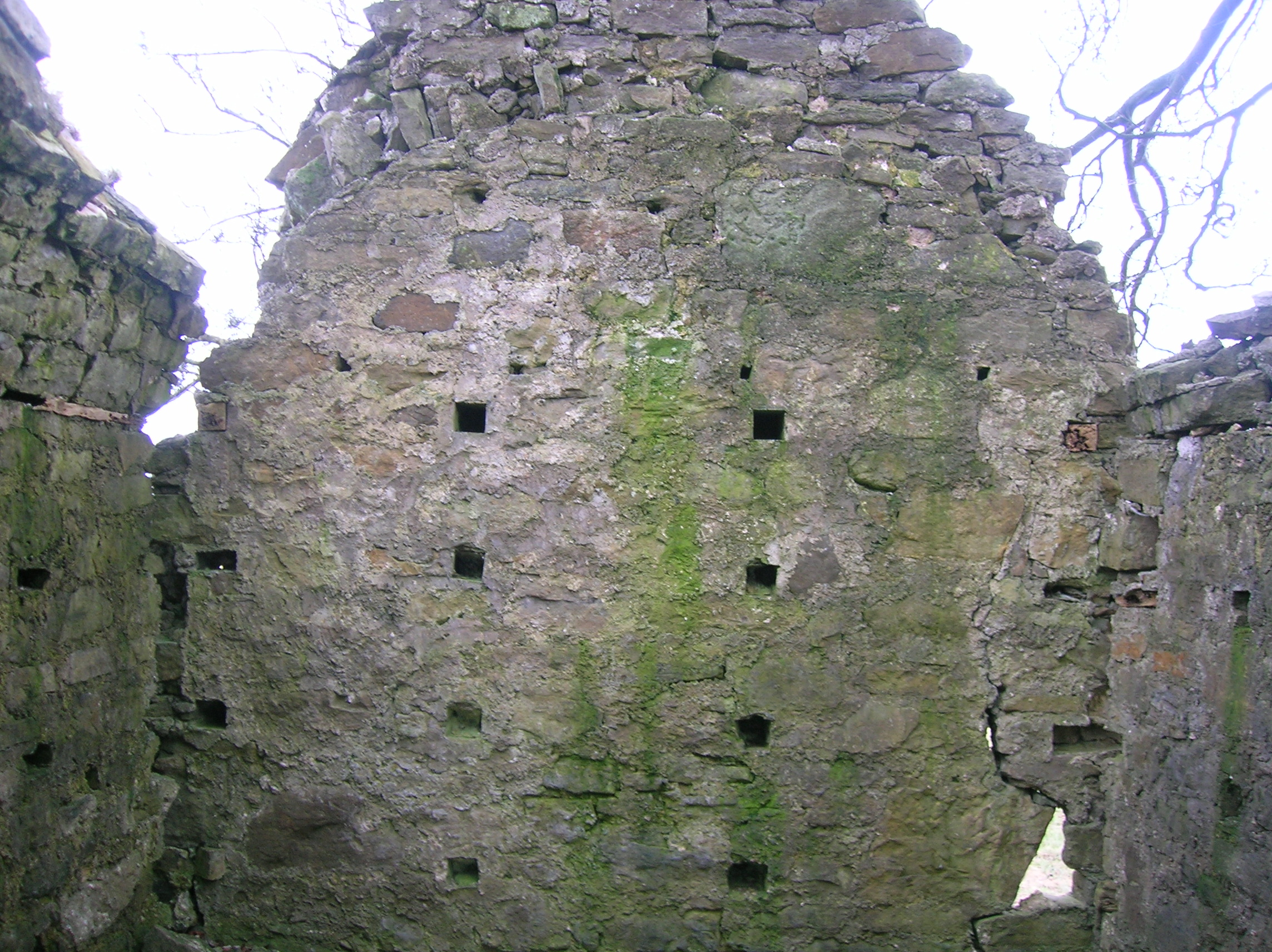
Internal detail of Dockra Powder House

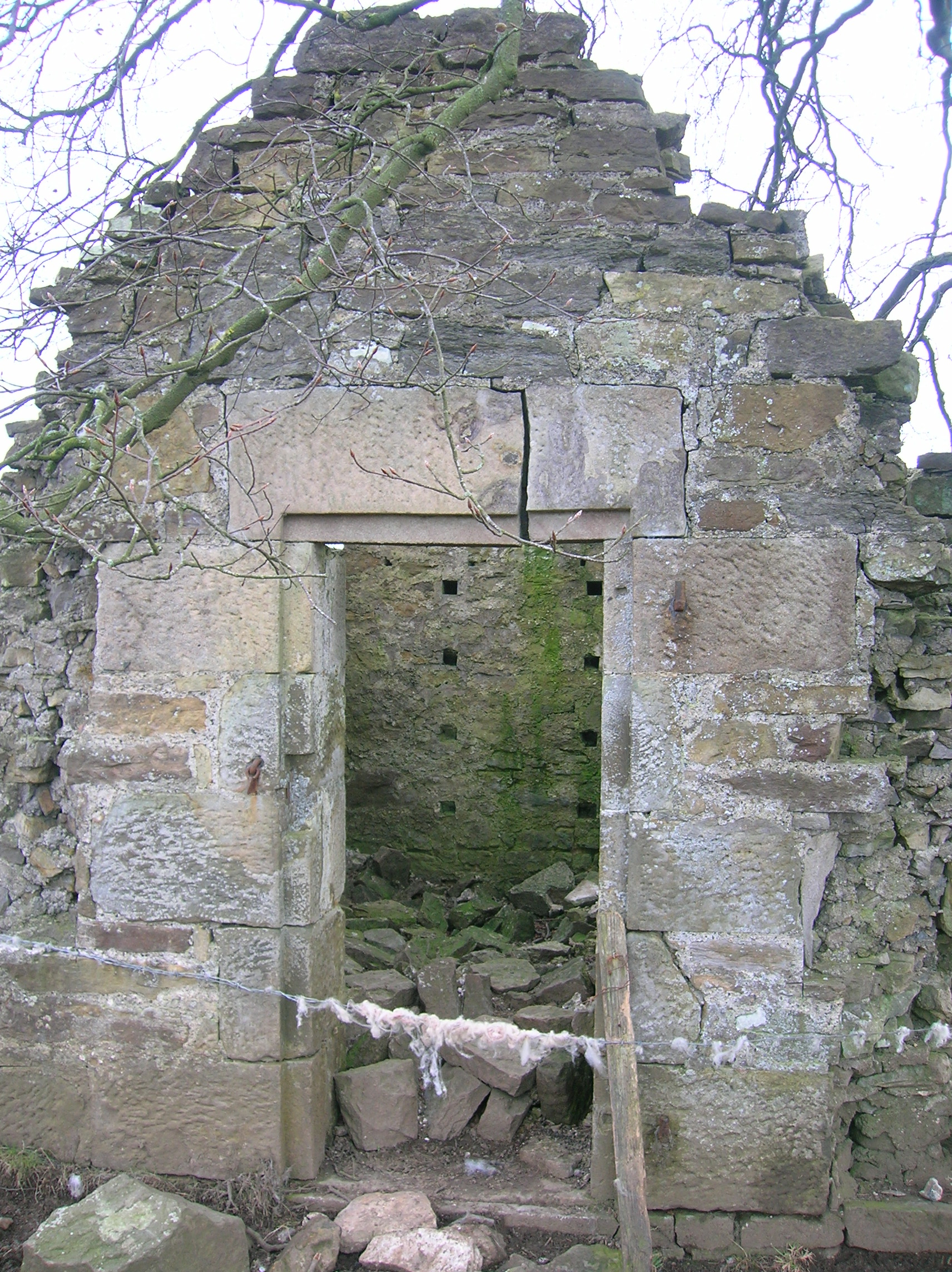
The door of Dockra Powder House

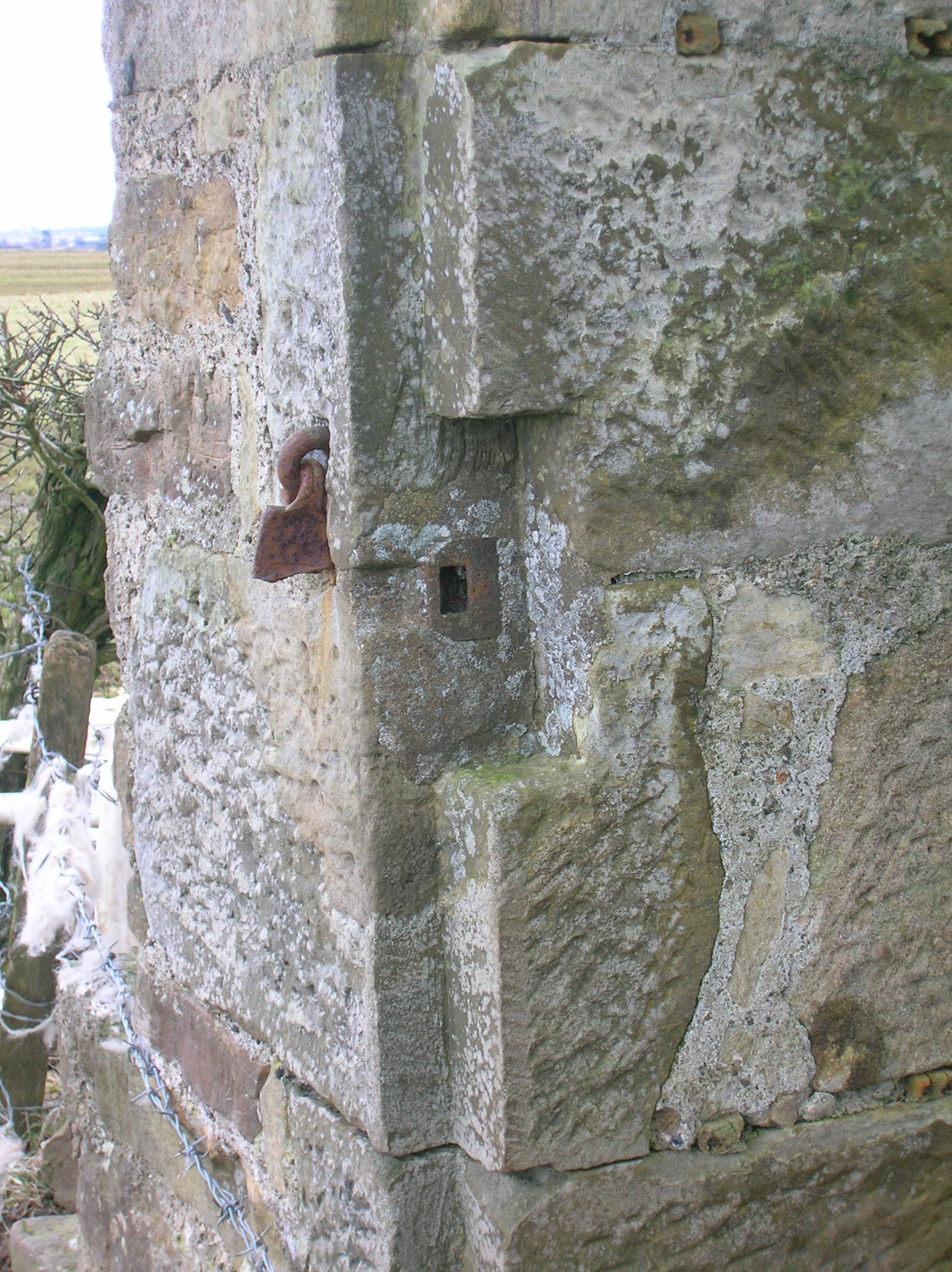
Detail of locking mechanism of Dockra Powder House

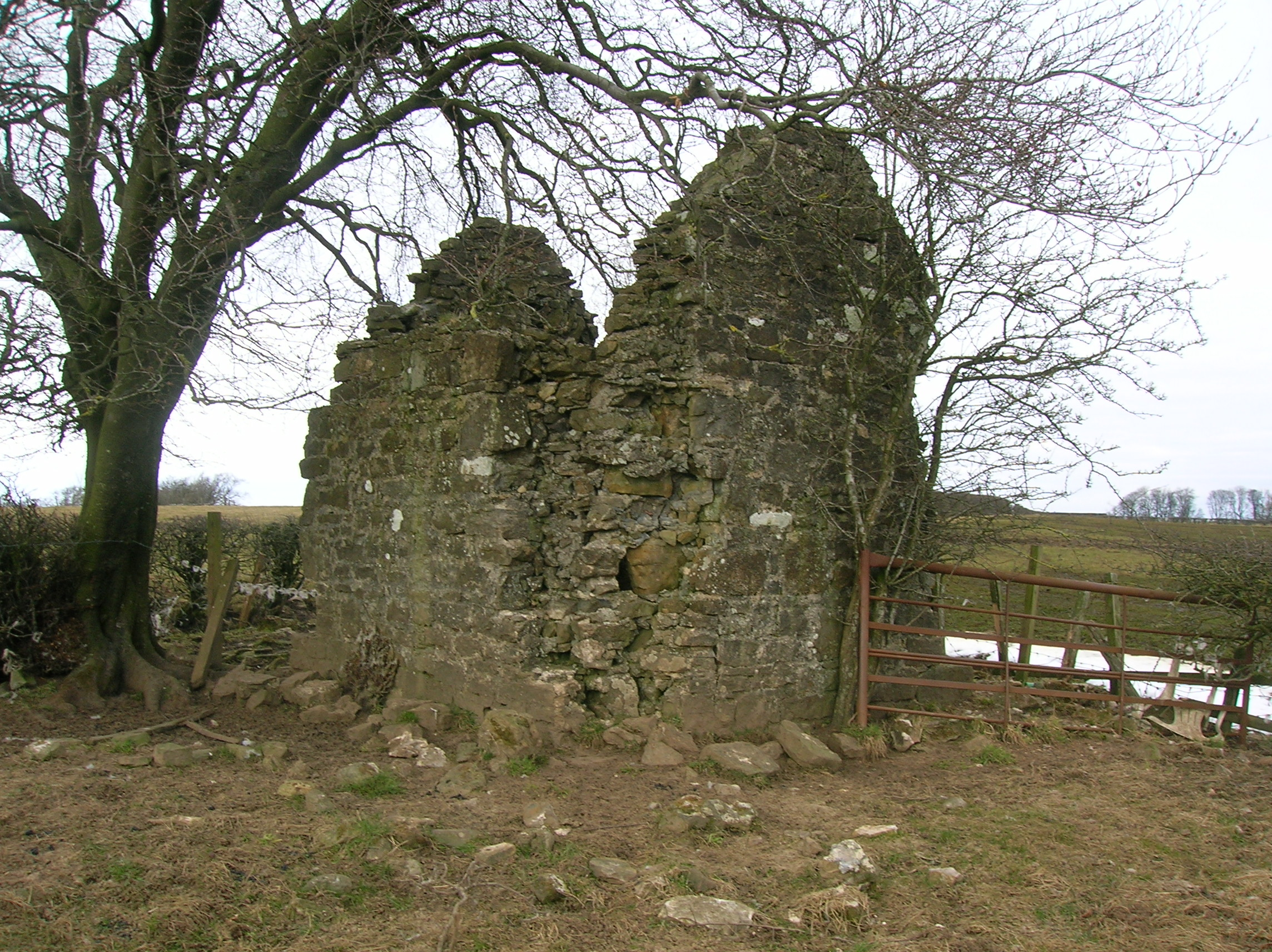
The gunpowder magazine of Dockra Powder House

The remains of old storage magazines are prominent in the landscape around the old Nobel's Explosives site in Ayrshire, many protected by large earth banks which acted as blast walls; these are not all gunpowder magazines, as the site has long been associated with other explosives, particularly dynamite and ballistite.

A gunpowder magazine was located near the site of the Low Well in the village of Barkip, also known as The Den, near Beith, North Ayrshire.

An explosives magazine at the old Hessilhead limestone Quarry near Beith had a small section for blasting caps and a larger section for sticks of dynamite.

A restored powder house at Culzean Castle stands close to the sea cliffs. It was used to store gunpowder for the battery and for the 8am daily cannon shot.

Dockra limestone quarry lies between Barrmill, Broadstone and Gateside and had two gunpowder magazines; the older one was built some distance from the works. The quarries closed before WW2.

Dumbarton Castle contained two powder magazines; both located high up on Dumbarton Rock. The oldest went out of use in 1748, being replaced by a new Magazine designed by William Skinner. The new magazine, located on The Beak, has a barrel-vaulted roof, with double doors and indirect ventilation. It was designed to hold 150 barrels.

Fort George was built between the end of the Jacobite rebellion of 1745 and 1769. The Grand Magazine was designed to hold 2,500 barrels of gunpowder. It was constructed between 1757 and 1759; and was built strong enough to withstand a direct hit from a mortar. It has a slate roof laid on brick vaults, which sit on stone pillars. To prevent sparks, no iron fittings are used in the magazine: the wooden floor is held by wooden dowels; and the doors and shutters sheathed with copper sheet.

The Pouther (Scots for Powder) House in Irvine (Map reference: NS 3238 3847), North Ayrshire, Scotland is a rare survival and was possibly first constructed in 1642, as records show that orders for large quantities of gunpowder were met in 1643, 1644, and 1646. James VI, of Scotland, had instructed that all Royal burghs should have powder magazines. The saltpetre derived from deposits in byres, stables and doocots would be stored in the Powder House.

Plans for rebuilding it were made in 1781, at the time of the Napoleonic Wars, and accomplished by 1801; its use was discontinued in 1880. The last use of the building was by Davidson the Ironmonger who stored carbide here for the miners. When the Golffields wash-house was demolished in 1924, its slates were saved by Provost R M Hogg for restoration of the Powder House, a rescue assisted by Rev. Ranken of the Old Parish Church. It was repaired in 1961 and again in 1992 by Irvine Development Corporation. It is an attractive and well built octagonal building topped by a weather cock.

The 1870 print shows that it was placed in a remote situation, a golf-course being developed around it in later years and when this closed it remained, still fairly remote, in a small park next to the old manse. Ironically, Irvine is close to the site of the old Nobel ICI explosives plant at Ardeer, which from the mid-1930s become the centre of gunpowder manufacture in Britain; and was the last site in Britain to manufacture gunpowder.

An unusual example exists in East Ayrshire, Scotland at Knockinglaw (now Knockenlaw mound); it is shown on the 1896 OS and still exists in very poor condition as of 2007. It is near Little Onthank on the outskirts of Kilmarnock, and was originally a tumulus in which urns had been found. A powder magazine was built into this large pre-existing earth mound at an unknown date and the site is now in a housing scheme.

== In the United States of America ==
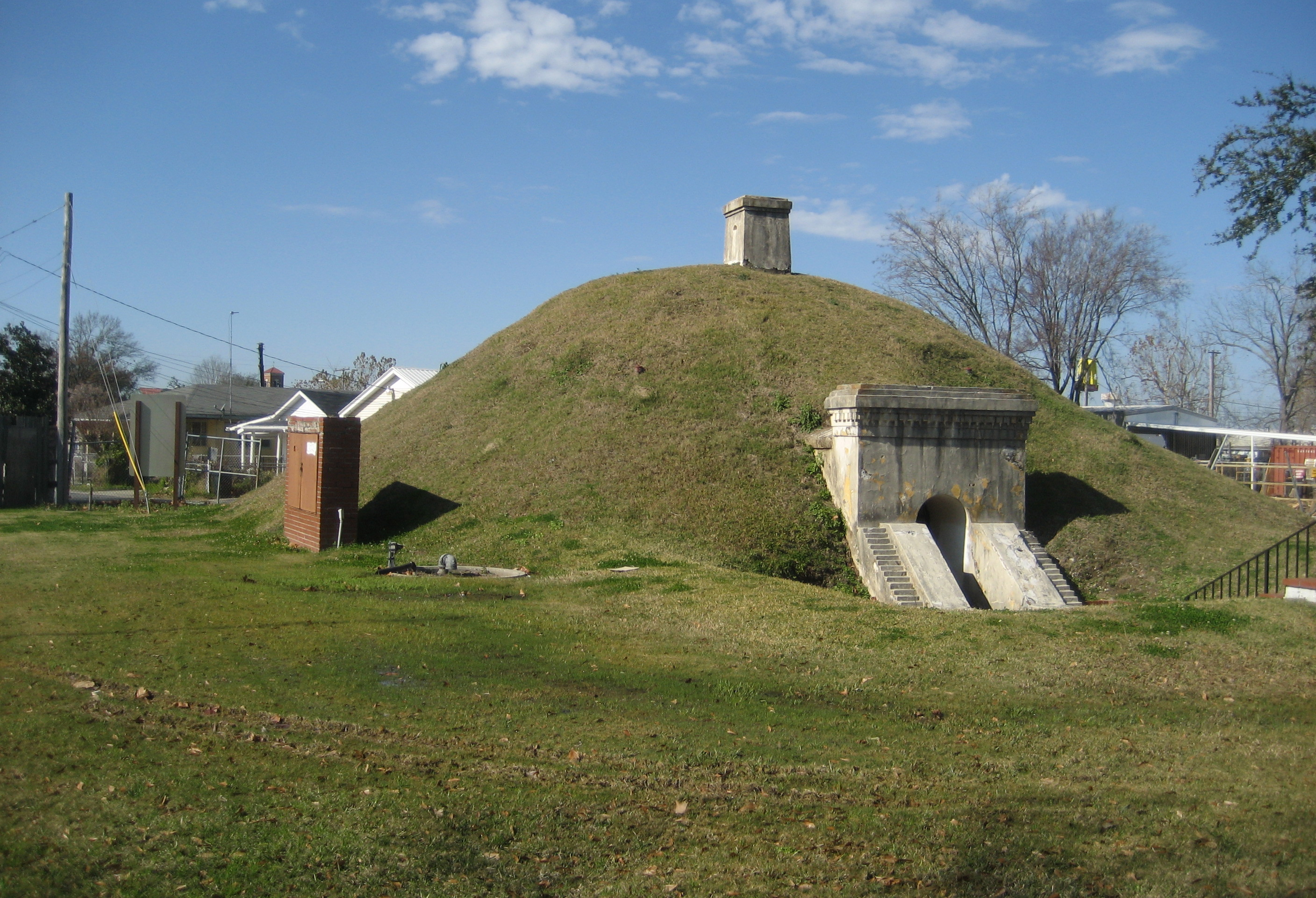
Camp Parapet Powder Magazine, Louisiana

Gunpowder magazines survive at the following locations, among others:

- Camp Parapet Powder Magazine, Metairie, Louisiana, listed on the National Register of Historic Places (NRHP)
- Powder House Square, a neighborhood and landmark rotary in Somerville, Massachusetts
- Magazine Beach, in Cambridgeport, Cambridge, Massachusetts
- Hessian Powder Magazine, Carlisle, Pennsylvania, listed on the NRHP
- Powder Magazine, Charleston, South Carolina, a National Historic Landmark and listed on the NRHP
- Jefferson Ordnance Magazine, Jefferson, Texas, listed on the NRHP
- Fort Richardson State Park, Jacksboro, Texas, located northwest of the fort's parade grounds
- Fort Point National Historic Site, San Francisco, California, located on the ground floor.
- Powder Magazine (Camp Drum), Los Angeles, California, part of the Drum Barracks complex.
- Enterprise South Industrial Park, Chattanooga, Tennessee, located within the Nature Park section.

== See also ==
- Magazine (artillery)

== Bibliography ==
- Cocroft, Wayne D. (2000). Dangerous Energy: The archaeology of gunpowder and military explosives manufacture. Swindon: English Heritage. ISBN 1-85074-718-0.
