= North Arm Powder Magazine =

Coordinates: 34.836°S 138.520°E

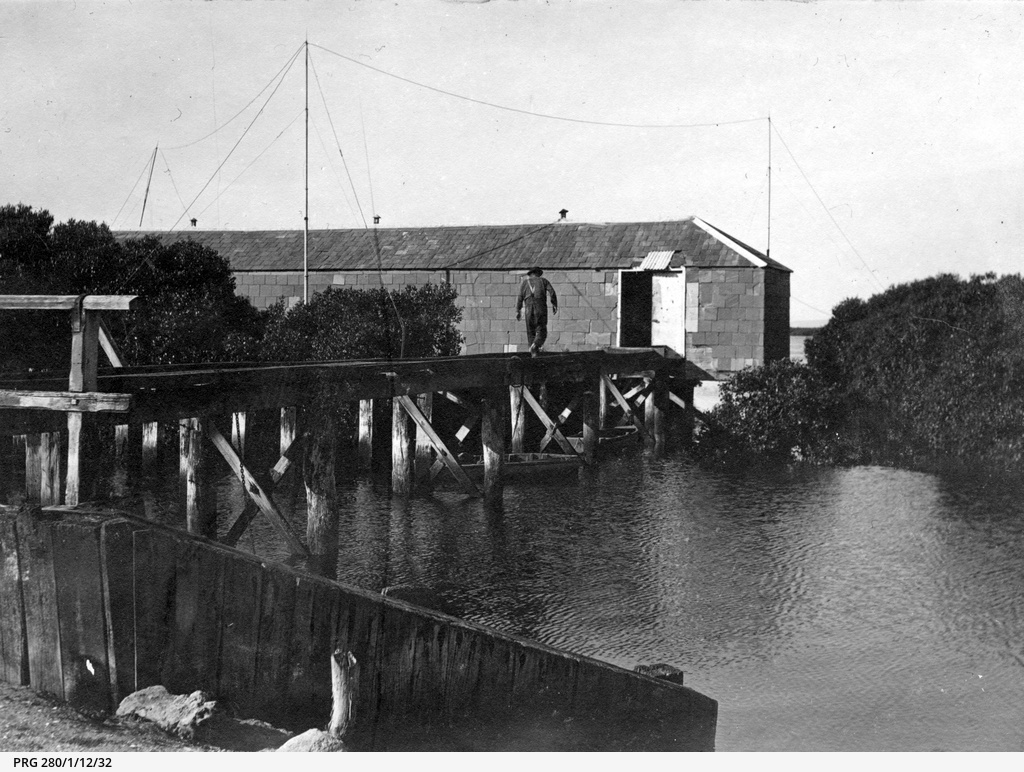
The North Arm powder magazine, predecessor of the Dry Creek explosives depot. The roof and walls were clad in slate to minimise the chance of sparks occurring, as could occur on a corrugated iron building.

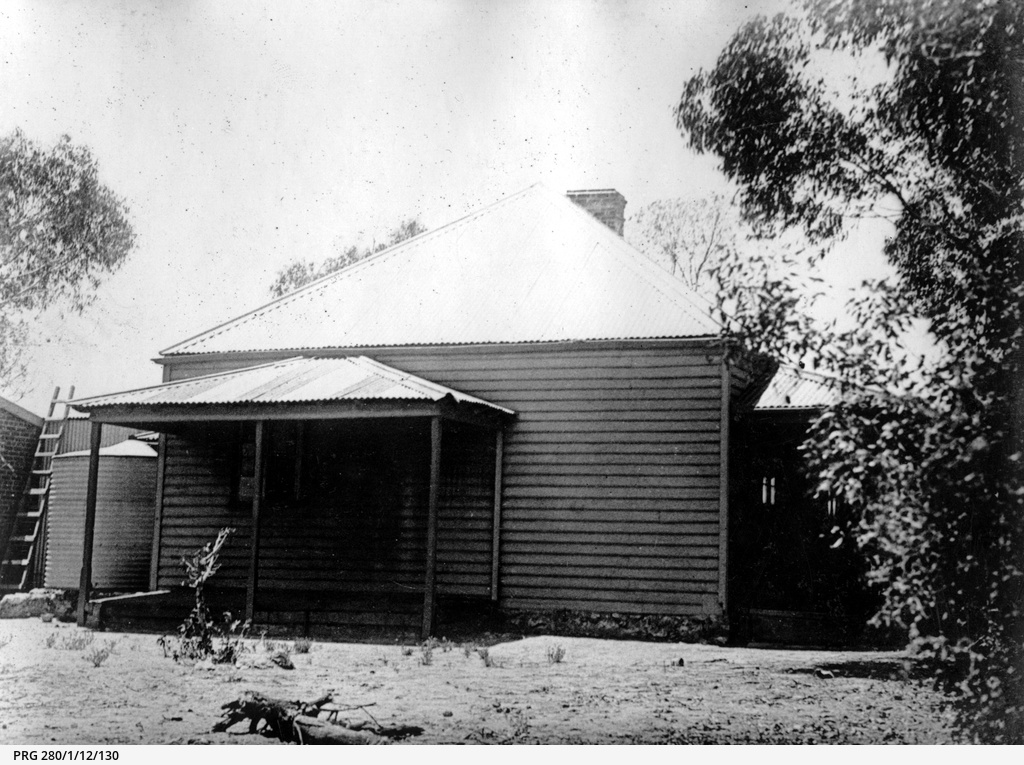
The magazine keeper's residence

The North Arm Powder Magazine near Port Adelaide, South Australia, was from 1858 to 1906 a secure storage facility for dynamite and gelignite used in the construction, mining and quarrying industries.

== Location ==
The magazine was in Gillman near Port Adelaide at the North Arm of the Port River only 9 metres away from the North Arm Bridge subsequently constructed on the North Arm Road. The explosives were stored in the wooden, slate-roofed magazine building and in two dynamite hulks moored in Magazine Creek. One of them was a retired iron dredger, built about 1852; the other was a former lighter. They were seen as a risk, if they were to explode, because they were close to new bridge and developing residential areas.

== Buildings ==
The South Australian Government constructed the magazine in 1858 as a lightweight structure on wooden poles due to its location at the tidal creek. Only later, this became best practice to mitigate secondary damage from an explosion by descending débris.

As the magazine was encroached by housing, only a decade after its commissioning proposals were made for its abandonment. However, it was not taken out of service until more than three decades later, in 1906, when its contents were transferred to the new Dry Creek explosives depot. The building was demolished in 1916. Subsequently, land reclamation has occurred and no visible evidence remains.
