= Dry Creek explosives depot =

Former explosives storage facility near Port Adelaide

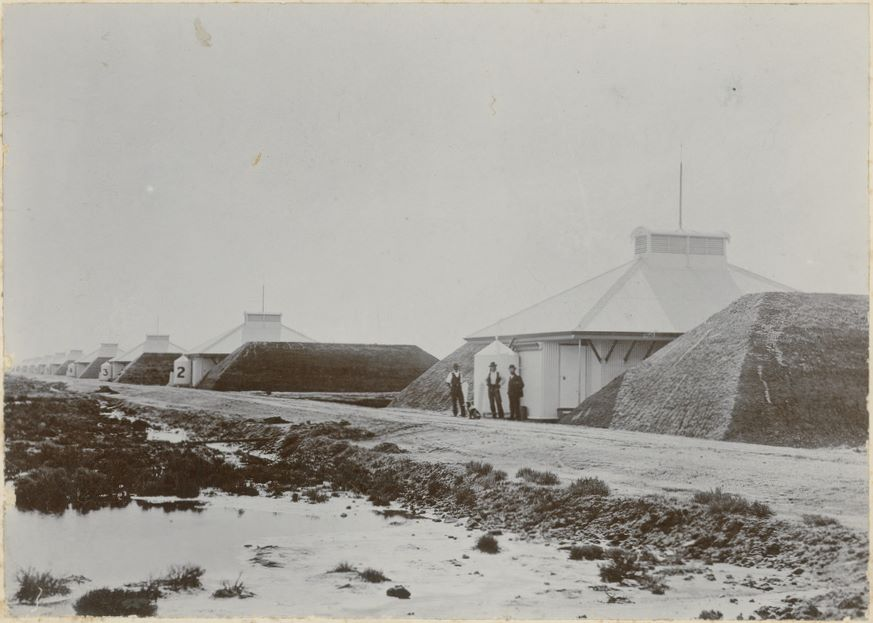
- Powder magazines at Dry Creek

- Location in South Australia

General information
- Status: Unoccupied
- Type: Government magazine
- Location: via Port River Expressway and Magazine Road, Dry Creek, Australia
- Coordinates: 34°49′42″S 138°34′48″E
- Construction started: 1906
- Completed: 1906
- Owner: South Australian Government

Dimensions
- Other dimensions: 200 metres (660 ft) wide by 1000 metres (3300 ft) long

The Dry Creek explosives depot was a secure storage facility at Dry Creek, near Port Adelaide, from 1904 to 1995, serving the construction, mining and quarrying industries of South Australia and the mines of Broken Hill in New South Wales.

== Construction ==
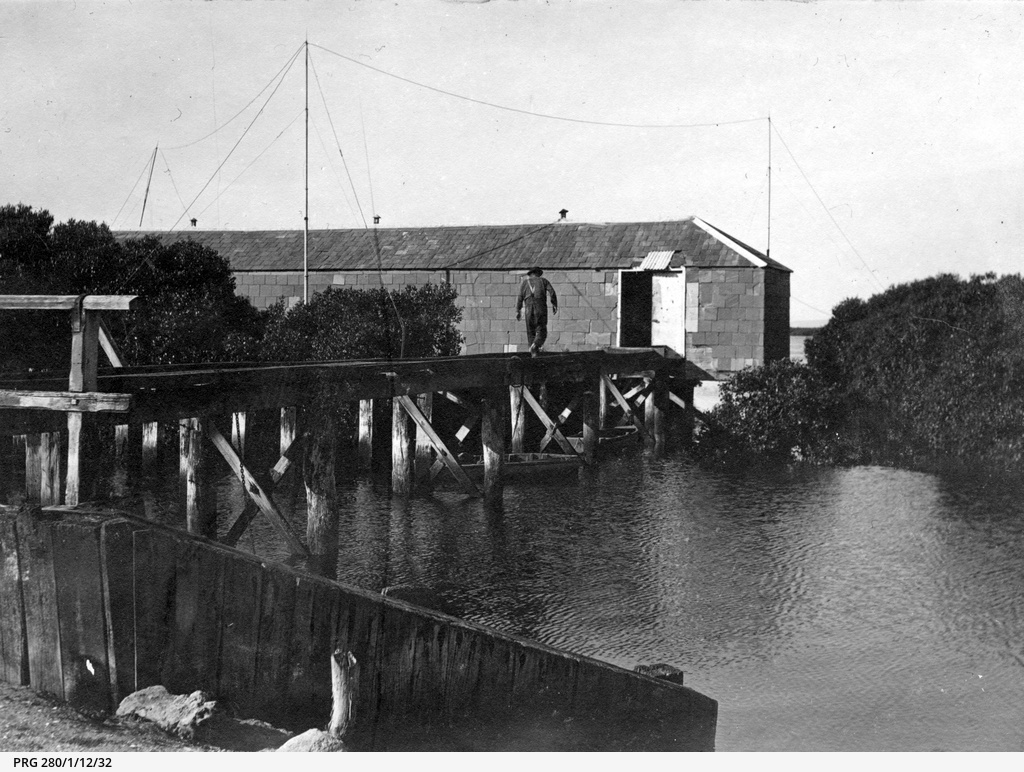
The predecessor of the Dry Creek explosives depot, the North Arm Powder Magazine at Magazine Creek, south of the North Arm of the Port River, Port Adelaide

The ten magazines of the Dry Creek explosives depot were built by the South Australian Government's Department of Chemistry in 1906 at a cost of £6,000 or £7,000 at Broad Creek, a tidal distributary channel on the eastern side of the Barker Inlet of the Port River Estuary, which runs in the direction of the now suburb of Dry Creek. The Broad Creek site, located on the landward side of intertidal mangroves and supratidal saltmarshes, was chosen as a more isolated location from Port Adelaide, replacing an earlier explosives depot called North Arm Powder Magazine at Magazine Creek at Gillman, south of the North Arm of the Port River.

== Horse tram ==
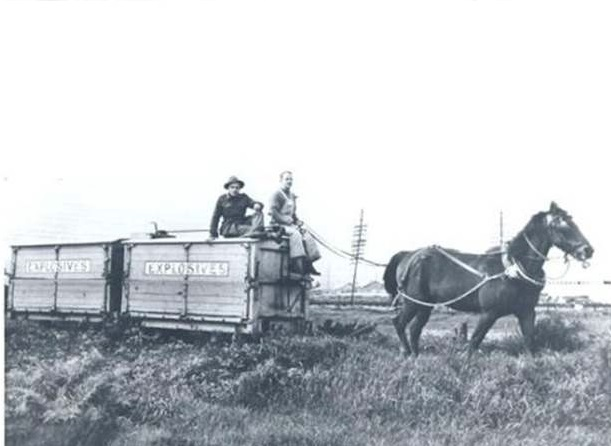
Horse-drawn wagons for carrying explosives in the Dry Creek explosives depot

A narrow gauge tramway with a track gauge of 610 mm (2 ft) was constructed in 1906. Running along the magazines, it connected the depot to the landing jetty, a distance of 2 kilometres (1.2 miles), and on the other side 800 metres (870 yards) to the Dry Creek railway station. Six small horse-drawn wagons of 1.25 long tons (1.27 metric tons) capacity transported explosives such as dynamite to the magazines. Previously, explosives had to be transported by road from the North Arm to the magazines, a dangerous and expensive practice.

One wagon was donated to the National Railway Museum, Port Adelaide, the remainder to the Illawarra Light Railway Museum.

== Inaugural inspection ==
The president of the Marine Board, Arthur Searcy, and four wardens inspected the depot in 1906 and found that handling and storage of explosives was superior to previous procedures. They had travelled by horse-drawn wagon to the magazines after landing at the Broad Creek jetty; each magazine was capable of storing 40 tons of explosives, although 20 tons were fixed as the maximum at that time. They observed that precautions had been taken to guard against explosion and printed regulations were on the magazine doors. Mounds had been built between each magazine so that should one of the magazines explode, no damage would result to the others. The magazine reserve, of about 307 acres (124 hectares), was being improved by planting tamarisk and other trees to provide shadow and explosion breaks.

== Operation ==
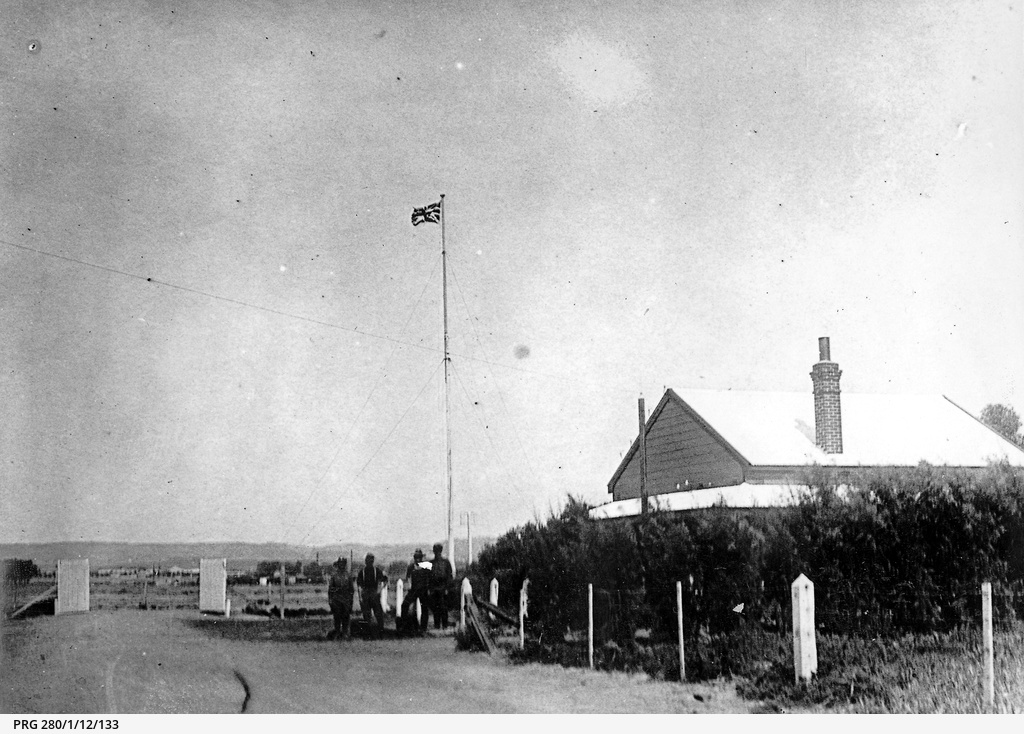
The powder magazine office at Dry Creek

Limewash was normally applied to magazines' exterior walls. Care was taken to minimise and isolate the explosives from damp, heat and grit. The magazine structures incorporated insulated walls to provide a naturally and reasonably cooled and ventilated environment. Their ventilation shafts were covered by metal ventilation louvres, coupled with spark arrestors and dust deflectors.

King tides regularly flooded the estuarine plain. Consequently, the tramline along the mangroves from the magazines to the jetty at Broad Creek was frequently damaged. In July 1917, the jetty was inundated by the highest tide on record, 11 feet 10 inches (3.6 metres) above low water, and was washed away. The following August an unusually high tide washed away the gear of the levee workmen, including planks, barrels, barricades and bags of silt, which disappeared without a trace.

== Decline ==
By 1925 explosives were delivered less frequently but in larger batches from Deer Park, Victoria, resulting in fewer explosives being delivered via the jetty. Fewer daily paid stevedores were needed and the turnover was reduced.

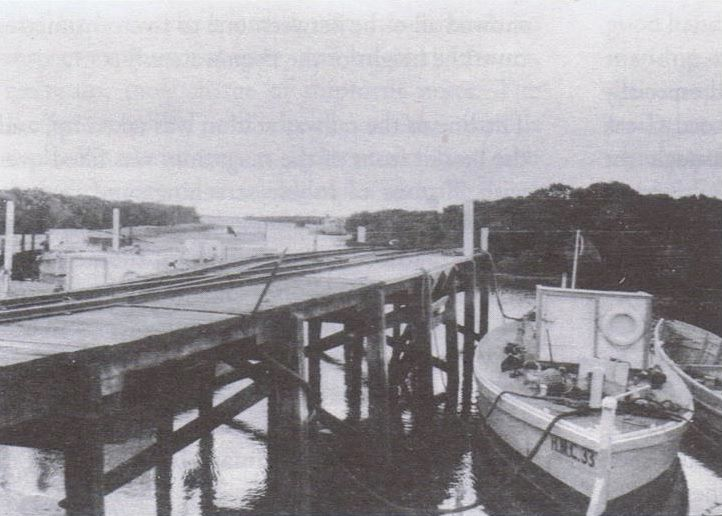
Jetty at Broad Creek

By 1934, shipworm and lack of preventive maintenance had materially weakened the wooden structures. From 1934, explosives were railed from Victoria directly to the depot via Dry Creek railway station. By 1947, all explosives were delivered in this way. In 1950 urgent safety-related repairs were ordered, although they were not undertaken until 1952. Decreasing revenue from the port trade led to lessened maintenance and dredging of the Broad Creek landing. The jetty was last used in 1970 and demolished about 1976.

As waterborne trade decreased, land transport of explosives was coupled to technological progress in explosive usage. From 1978, ammonium nitrate became an ingredient of explosives mixtures that could be prepared on-site. Further safety refinements and diffusion of responsibility for explosive storage followed, eliminating much of the previously needed inspection, sampling and storage undertaken at the depot.

== Closure ==
Operation of the site ceased in October 1995. Eleven of the historic buildings at Dry Creek, built from 1903 to 1907, were listed on the South Australian Heritage Register in 1994. They were generally sound except for reinforcement bars in hollow concrete piles.

== Condition in 2015 ==
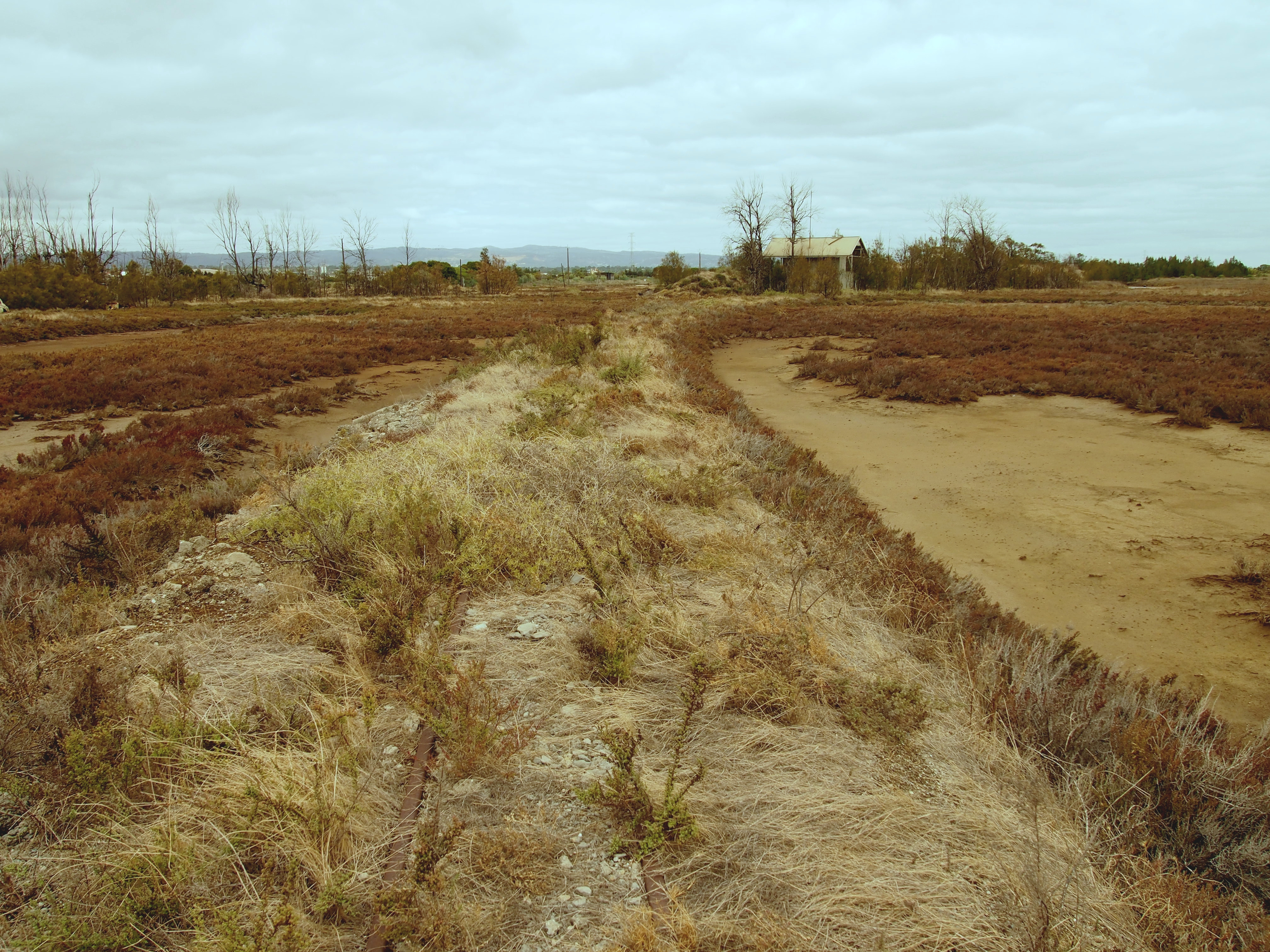
Causeway of the former tramway across the saltmarsh from Broad Creek to the explosives stores in 2015

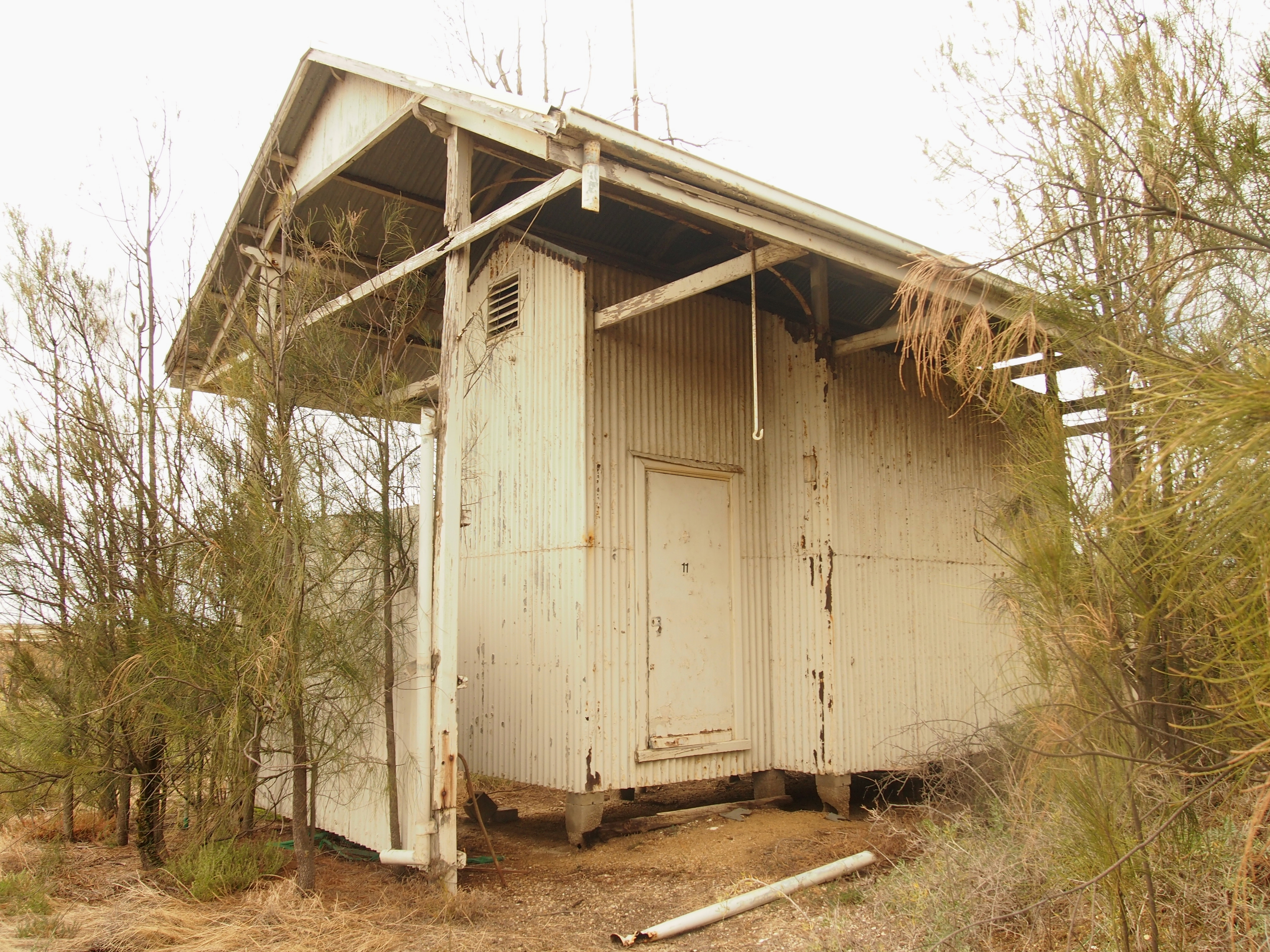
Explosives store No. 11 has a different structure to stores Nos. 1-10, which were all built to an identical pattern

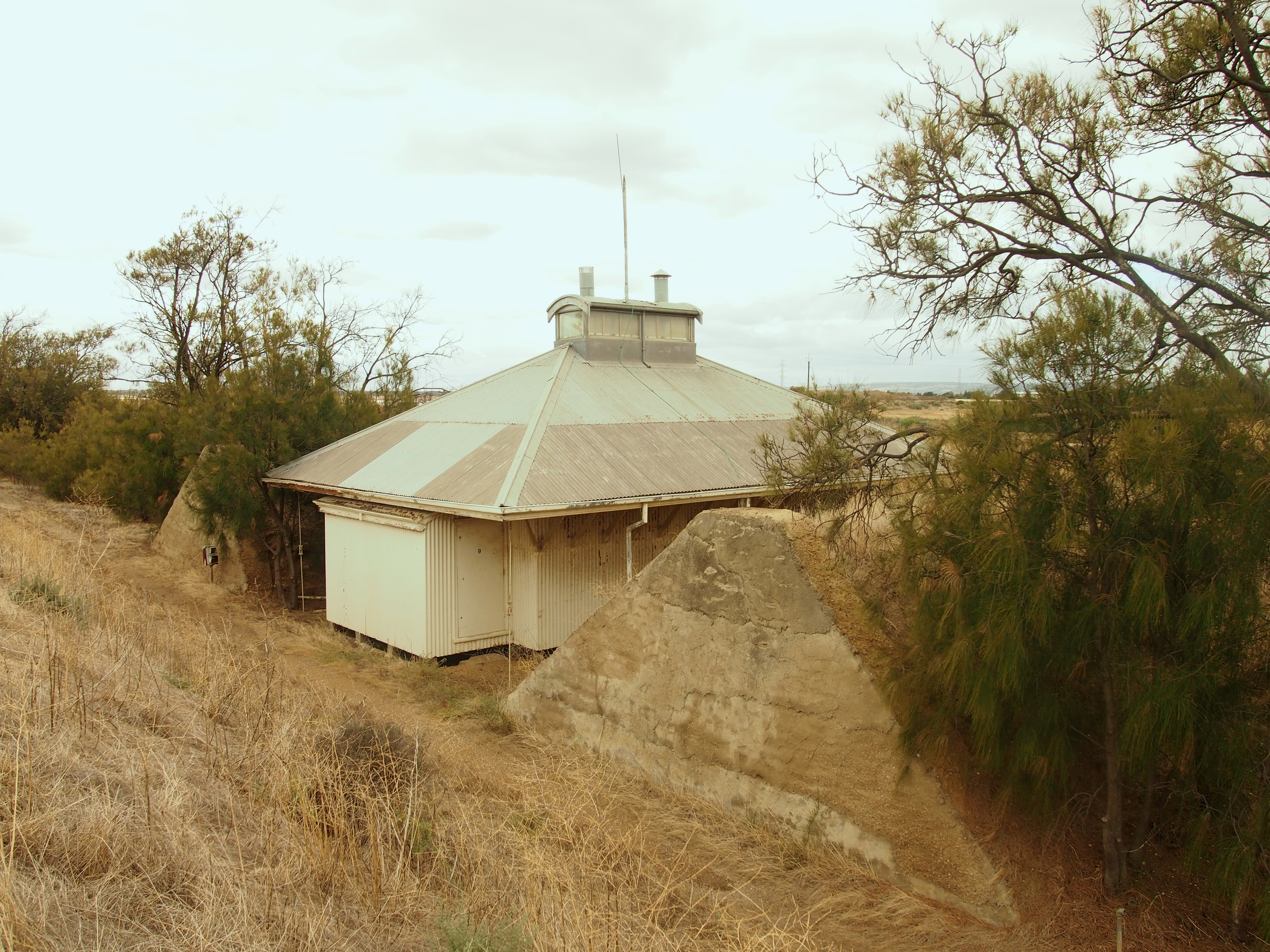
Explosives store No. 9, viewed from the southwest in 2015

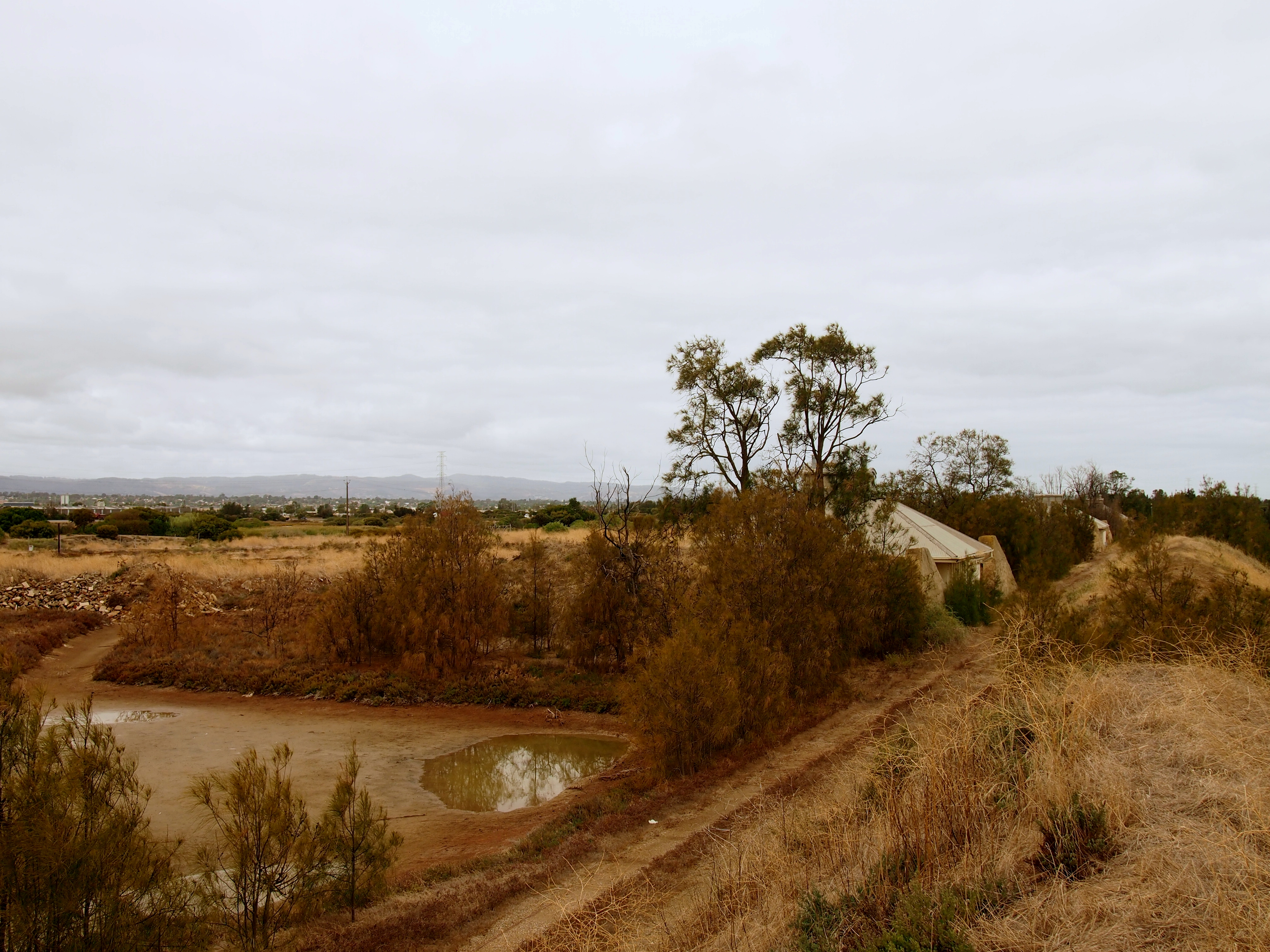
Explosives store No. 8, with bunds constructed with soil from adjacent borrow pit

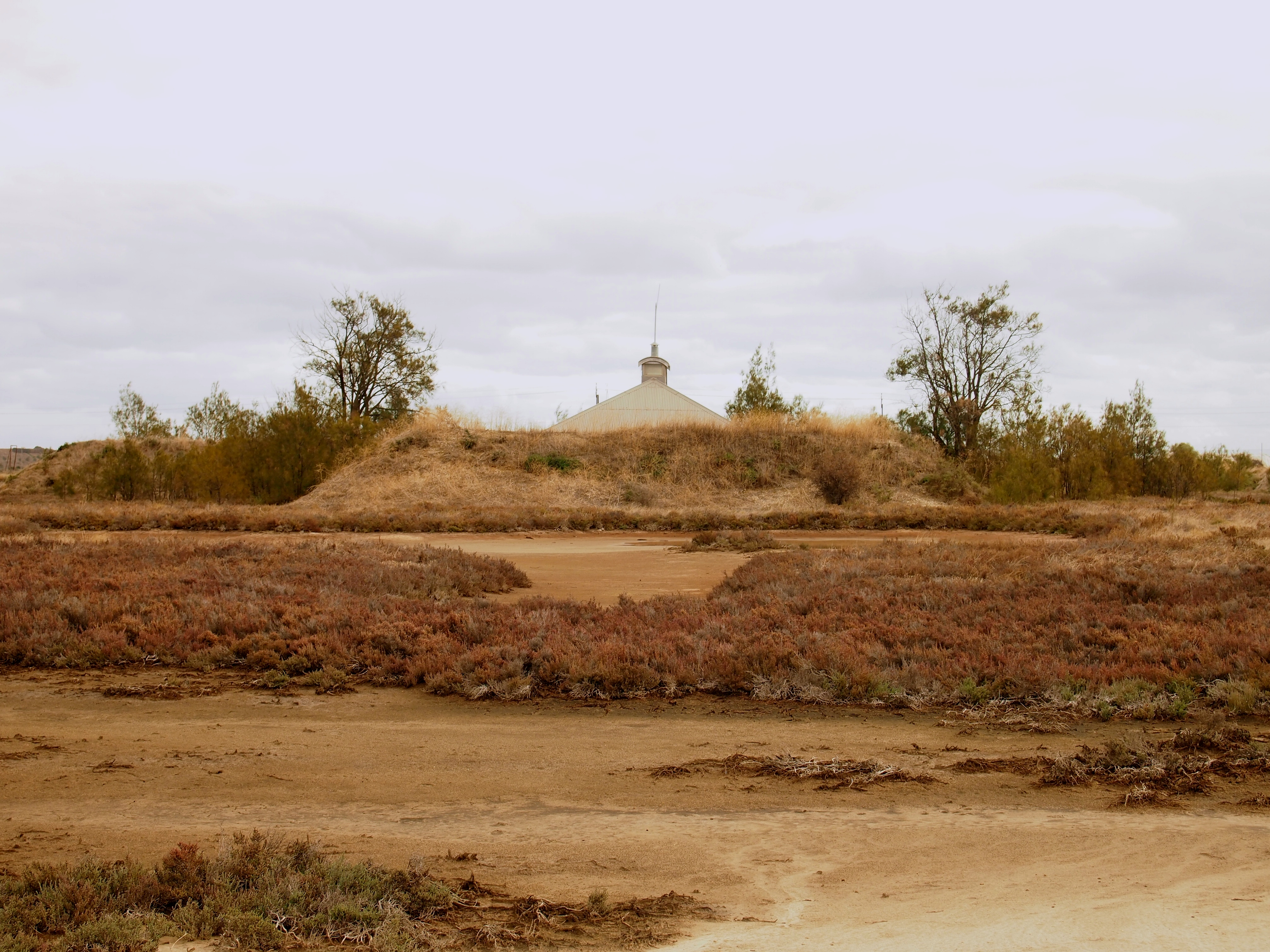
Rear bund of explosives store No. 8

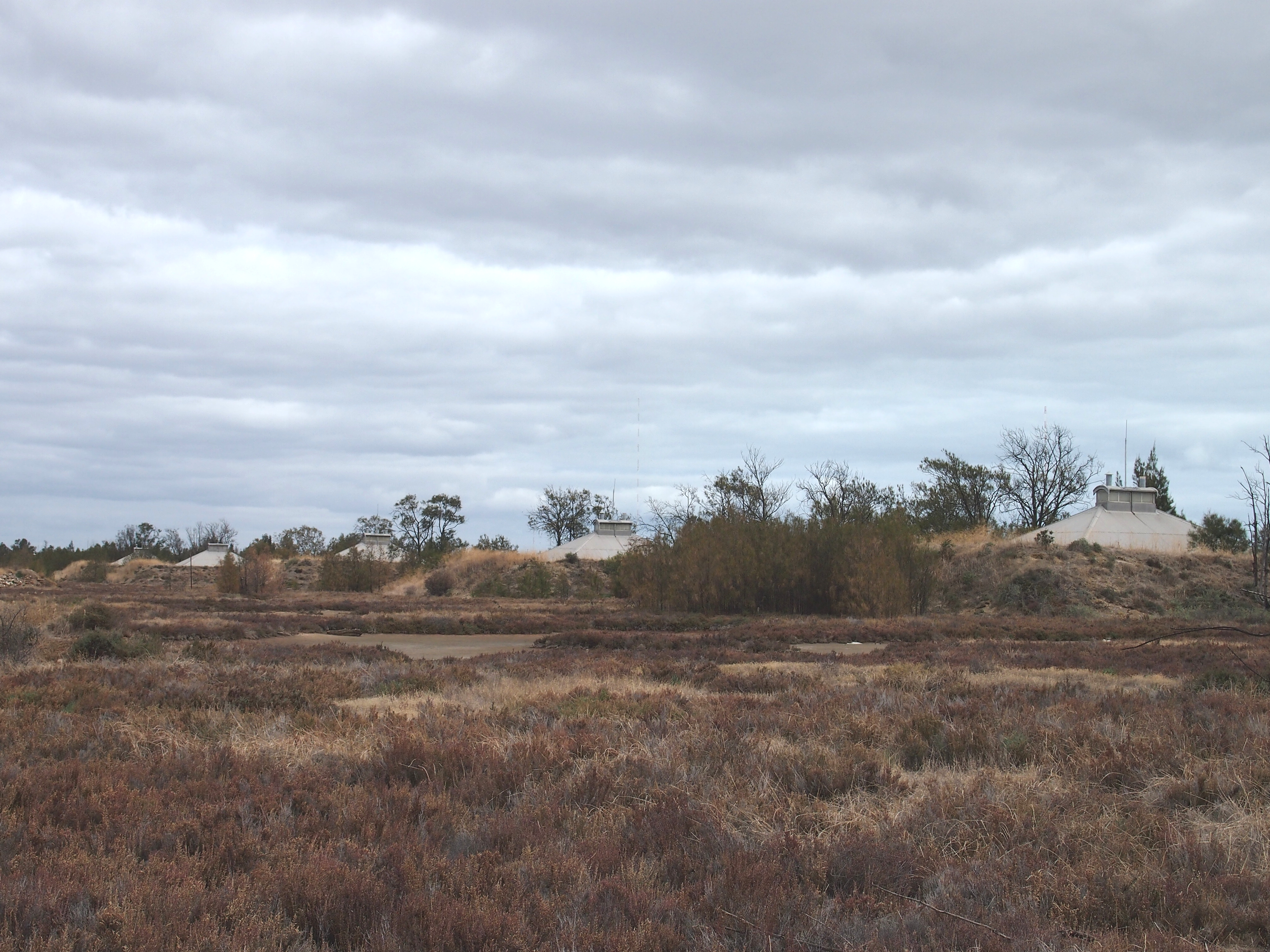
Rear bunds of explosives stores Nos. 6-10

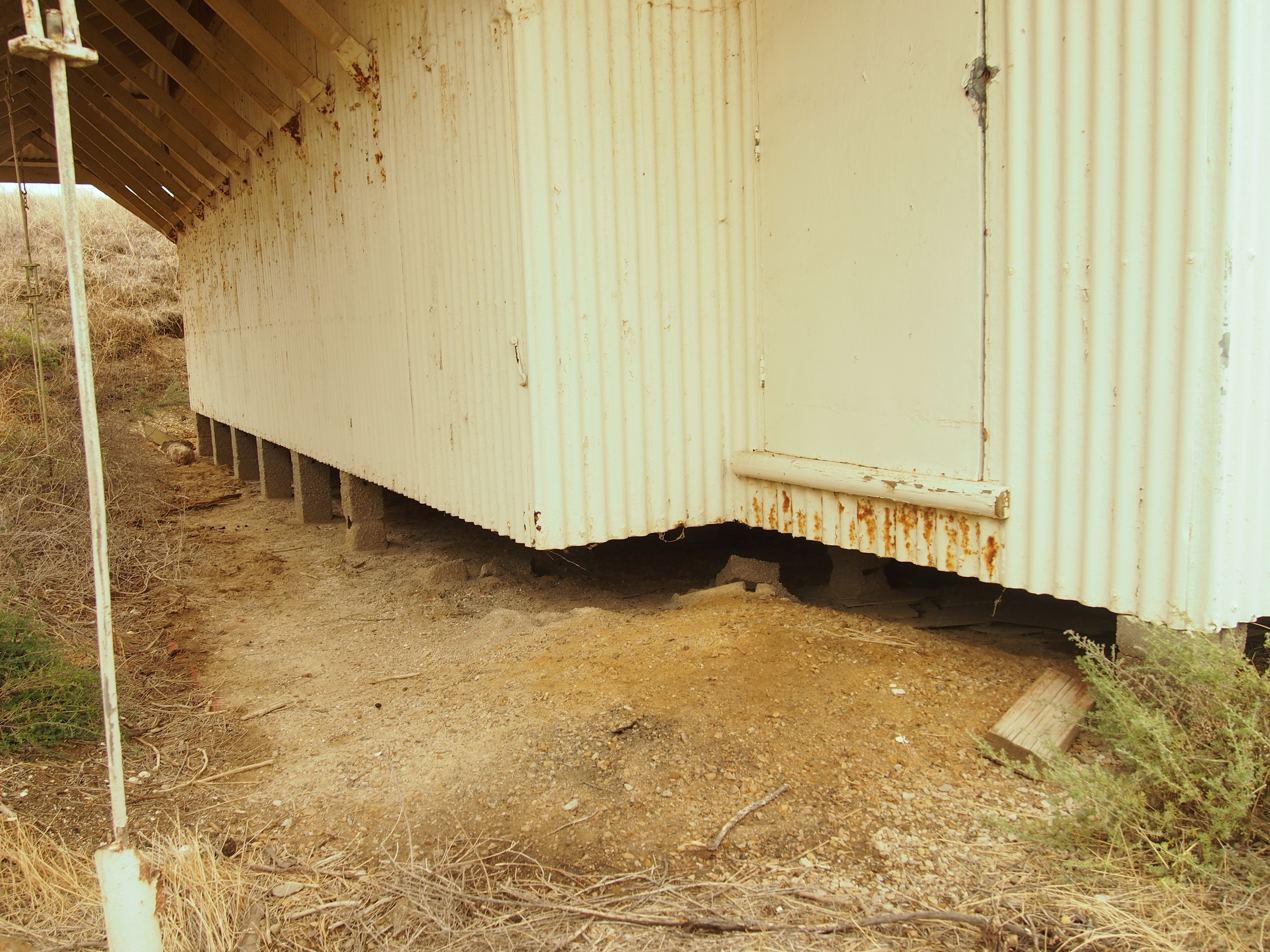
Crumbling concrete piles of explosives store No. 9

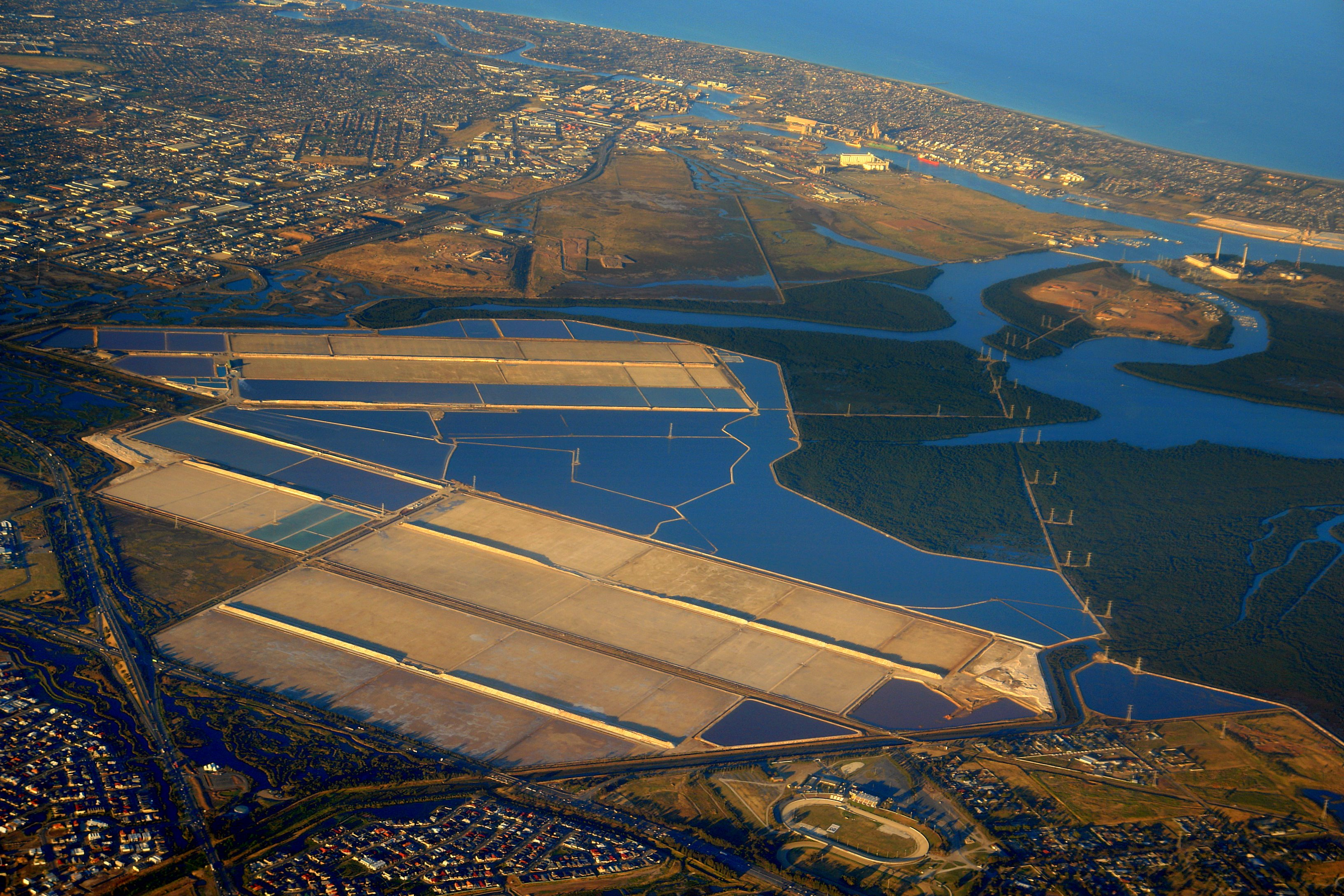
Dry Creek salt crystallisation pans in 2008, view to the southwest, towards Port Adelaide. The buildings of the Dry Creek explosives depot are just visible on the left of the photo, at the point where the lines of alignment of the salt pans appear to converge. The narrow gauge railway line to Broad Creek (visible in the middle distance) was covered by later development of the salt pans and the construction of the North–South Motorway.
