= List of Indigenous Australian sportspeople =

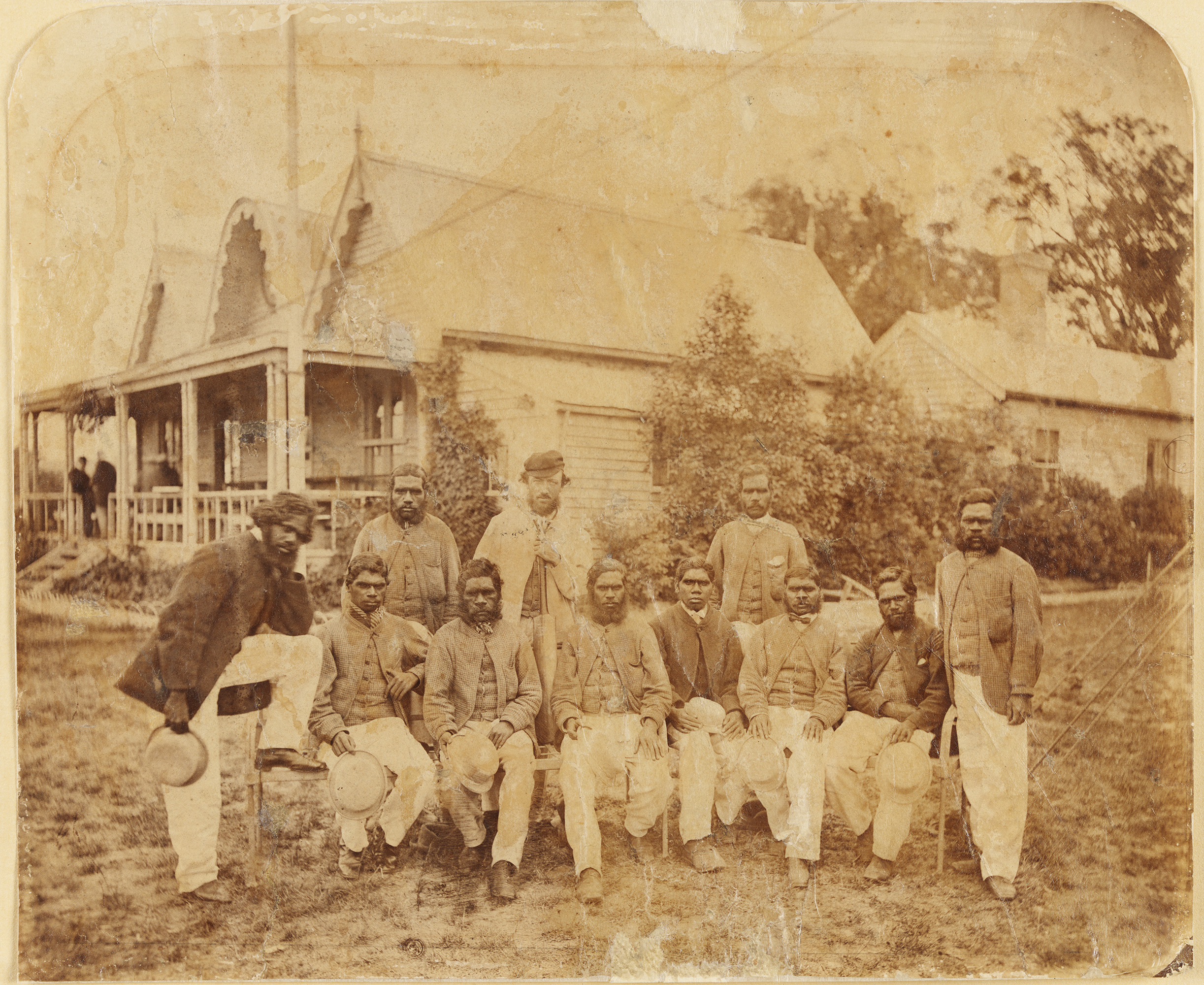
Aboriginal Cricket Team with Tom Wills (coach and captain), Melbourne Cricket Ground, December 1866

This is a list of Indigenous Australian (Aboriginal and Torres Strait Islander) athletes and sportspeople. Sports is one of the areas of mainstream Australian society in which Indigenous Australians have been able to break through in some degree.

== American football ==
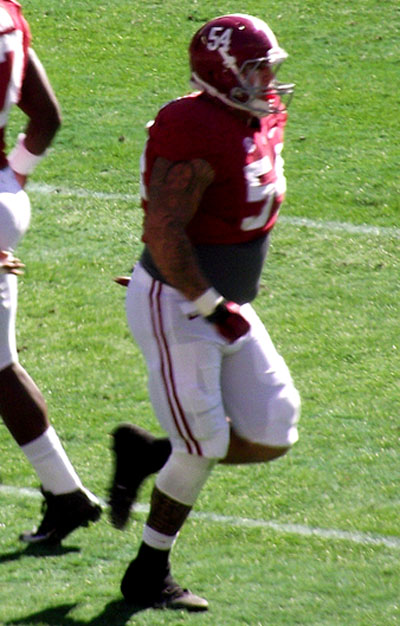
Jesse Williams

- Jesse Williams

== Association football (Soccer) ==
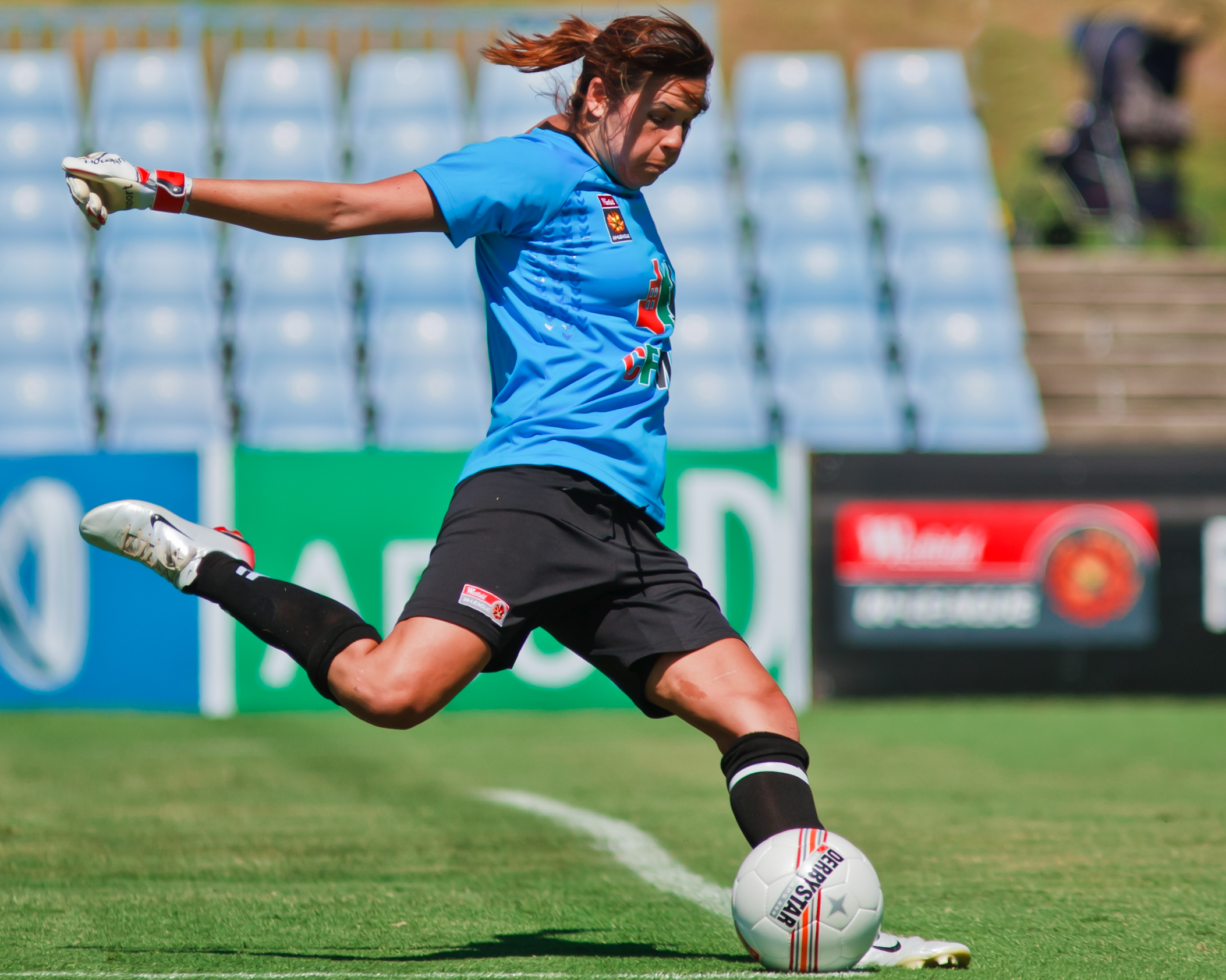
Lydia Williams

- Fred Agius
- Gordon Briscoe
- James Brown
- Jacob Collard
- Travis Dodd
- Shadeene Evans
- Frank Farina
- Harry Kewell
- Jada Mathyssen-Whyman
- Tahj Minniecon
- John Moriarty
- Jade North, first Indigenous association footballer to captain Socceroos and captain national league championship
- Tanya Oxtoby
- Charles Perkins
- Tate Russell
- Adam Sarota
- Gema Simon
- Kyah Simon
- Lorenzo Sipi
- Bridgette Starr
- Gianni Stensness
- Allira Toby
- Kasey Wehrman
- David Williams
- Harry Williams
- Lydia Williams

== Athletics (track and field) ==
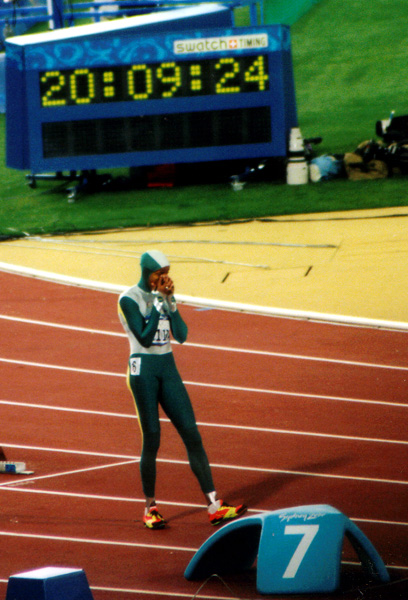
Cathy Freeman

- Lynch Cooper
- Robert Crowther
- Cathy Freeman
- Benn Harradine
- Percy Hobson
- Patrick Johnson
- Bobby Kinnear
- Nova Peris-Kneebone
- Wilfred Thomas Prince
- Josh Ross
- Kyle Vander Kuyp

== Australian rules football ==
- Chance Bateman
- Harley Bennell
- Eddie Betts
- Shai Bolton
- Peter Burgoyne
- Shaun Burgoyne
- Barry Cable
- Charlie Cameron
- Troy Cook
- Leon Davis
- Alwyn Davey
- Aaron Davey
- Courtenay Dempsey
- Shane Edwards
- Graham "Polly" Farmer
- Jeff Farmer
- Lance Franklin
- Jeff Garlett
- Adam Goodes
- Brett Goodes
- Antoni Grover
- Jarrod Harbrow
- Des Headland
- Bradley Hill
- Josh Hill
- Stephen Hill
- Eddie Hocking
- Syd Jackson
- Lewis Jetta
- Leroy Jetta
- Neville Jetta
- Graham Johncock
- Chris Johnson
- Joe Johnson, first ever Indigenous Australian to play in the VFL/AFL
- Michael Johnson
- Liam Jones
- Dale Kickett
- Derek Kickett
- Andrew Krakouer
- Jim and Phil Krakouer
- Nathan Krakouer
- Chris Lewis
- Ben Long
- Michael Long
- Nathan Lovett-Murray
- Brandon Matera
- Peter Matera
- Phillip Matera
- Steven May
- Norm McDonald
- Anthony McDonald-Tipungwuti
- Ashley McGrath
- Michael McLean
- Andrew McLeod
- Stephen Michael
- Steven Motlop
- Justin Murphy
- Sir Douglas Nicholls, Australian rules footballer and Governor of South Australia
- Michael O'Loughlin
- Danyle Pearce
- Jared Petrenko
- Byron Pickett
- Kysaiah Pickett
- Marlion Pickett
- Cyril Rioli
- Daniel Rioli
- Dean Rioli
- Maurice Rioli
- Maurice Rioli Jr
- Willie Rioli
- Patrick Ryder
- Matthew Stokes
- Richard Tambling
- Lindsay Thomas
- Travis Varcoe
- Andrew Walker
- Michael Walters
- Gavin Wanganeen
- Daniel Wells
- Darryl White
- Mark Williams
- Zac Williams
- Chad Wingard
- Nicky Winmar
- Michael Walters
- David Wirrpanda

== Basketball ==
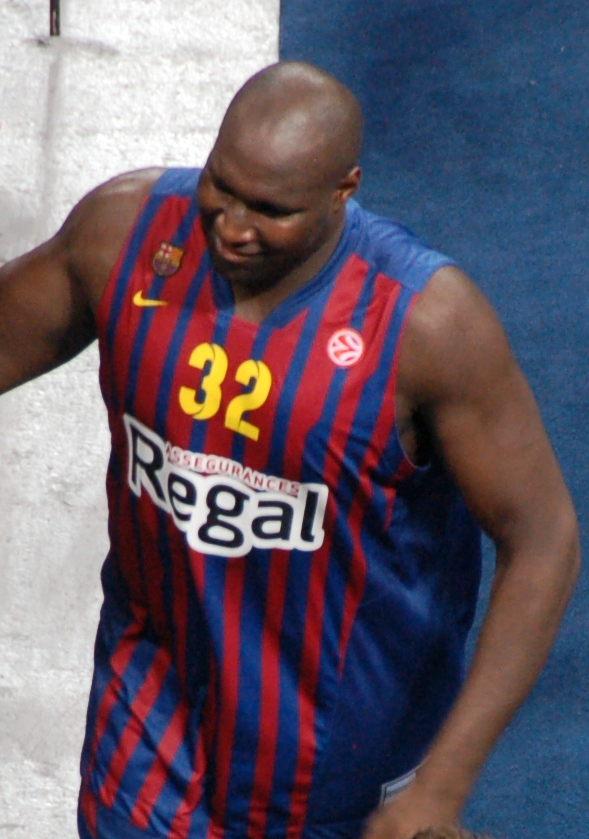
Nathan Jawai

- Rohanee Cox
- Nathan Jawai, first Indigenous Australian to play in the NBA
- Patty Mills
- Danny Morseu

== Boxing ==
- Lawrence Austin
- Elley Bennett
- Wally Carr, held the Australasian Light Middleweight title, Australian Junior Middleweight, Middleweight, Super Middleweight, Light Heavyweight Title, Commonwealth Middleweight title and Oriental Middleweight title.
- Paul Fleming
- Daniel Geale, former IBF, IBO and WBA Super Middleweight Champion.
- Cameron Hammond
- Damien Hooper
- Bradley Hore
- Jerry Jerome, first Indigenous Australian to win a major boxing title, Australian Middleweight Champion.
- Anthony Mundine, holds WBC Silver Super Welterweight title, former Interim WBA Light Middleweight Champion, 2 time WBA Super Middleweight Champion, IBO Middleweight Champion.
- Tony Mundine, held the Australian middleweight, light heavyweight, cruiserweight and heavyweight titles, Commonwealth middleweight and light heavyweight titles.
- Robbie Peden, former IBF Super Featherweight Champion.
- Ron Richards, held the Australian heavyweight, middleweight, light heavyweight title, Commonwealth middleweight title.
- Renold Quinlan
- Frank Roberts, Australia's first Indigenous Olympic boxer.
- Lionel Rose, held WBC & WBA World bantamweight titles, the first Koori "Indigenous Australian" to win a world title.
- Dave Sands, held the Australian middleweight, light heavyweight and heavyweight titles and won the Commonwealth middleweight title, world boxing hall of famer.
- Keith Saunders
- Hector Thompson
- Joe Williams
- Neville "Chappy" Williams

== Cricket ==
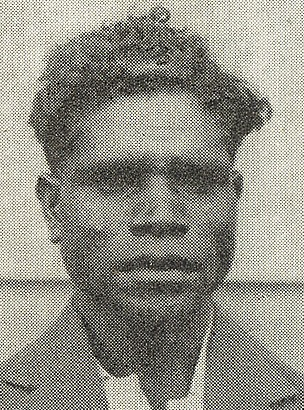
Eddie Gilbert

- Scott Boland, only the second male Indigenous Australian as of 2021 to play Test Cricket for Australia.
- Dan Christian
- Ashleigh Gardner, first Indigenous Australian woman to play in a cricket World Cup.
- Eddie Gilbert, 1930s Queensland cricketer
- Jason Gillespie, first male indigenous Australian to play cricket for Australia, and until Scott Boland's debut in 2021, the only one to play Test Cricket for Australia.
- Jack Marsh
- John McGuire, captain of an Aboriginal XI that toured England in 1988
- Johnny Mullagh, 1860s cricketer, who was a member of the Aboriginal cricket team that toured England in 1868
- Edna Newfong (Crouch) and Mabel Crouch (Campbell), were members of the Queensland XI women's cricket team that played England in 1934–35, they were the first Indigenous women to represent Australia in any sport.
- D'Arcy Short
- Faith Thomas, first female Indigenous Australian in the Australian Women's Cricket Team and thus the first Indigenous Australian woman to play Test cricket.

== Darts ==
- Beau Anderson
- Kyle Anderson

== Field hockey ==
- Des Abbott
- Joel Carroll
- Baeden Choppy
- Lorelle Morrissey
- Nova Peris-Kneebone
- Brooke Peris

== Horse racing ==
- Lester Fell, jockey, Indigenous histories
- Darby McCarthy, jockey
- Frank Reys, jockey

== Motorsport ==
- Craig Anderson, Motocross
- Jeff Leisk, Motocross
- Chad Reed, Motocross

== Rugby league ==
- Matthew Allwood
- Tyson Andrews
- Preston Campbell
- Sam Backo
- Ben Barba
- Michael Bani
- Kurt Baptiste
- Lenny Beckett
- Roy Bell
- Arthur Beetson, First Indigenous Australian to captain Australia in any sport (1973)
- Sam Bowie
- Matt Bowen
- Brenton Bowen
- Nathan Blacklock (also rugby union)
- Maurice Blair
- Greg Bird
- Fred Briggs
- Justin Brooker
- Caleb Binge
- Jason Bulgarelli
- Burnum Burnum
- Justin Carney
- Will Chambers (also rugby union)
- Beau Champion
- Selwyn Cobbo
- Mal Cochrane
- Larry Corowa
- Owen Craigie
- Tony Currie
- Laurie Daley
- Paul Davis
- Nakia Davis-Welsh
- Sid Domic
- Justin Doyle
- Leo Dynevor
- Jason Edwards
- Steve Ella
- Dylan Farrell
- Andrew Fifita
- David Fifita
- Blake Ferguson
- John Ferguson
- Frank Fisher
- Jake Friend
- Jake Foster
- Dane Gagai
- Craig Garvey
- George Green
- Isaac Gordon
- Yillenn Gordon
- Ron Gibbs
- Brett Grogan
- Chris Grevsmuhl
- Jeff Hardy
- Tony Hearn
- Shannon Hegarty
- Justin Hodges
- Jayden Hodges
- Josh Hoffman
- Neil Henry
- Kyle Turner
- Greg Inglis, Most tries scored in State of Origin
- Jamal Idris
- Willie Isa
- Ryan James
- Alex Johnston
- Ben Jones
- Rod Jensen
- Johnny Jarrett
- Albert Kelly
- Luke Kelly
- Robert Lui
- Gavin Lester
- Cliff Lyons
- Daine Laurie
- Ian Lacey
- Royston Lightning
- Kevin Longbottom
- Tom Learoyd-Lahrs
- Robert Laurie
- Edrick Lee
- Brenko Lee
- Michael Lett
- George Longbottom
- Kevin Longbottom
- Cliff Lyons
- Graham Lyons
- Lionel Morgan
- Anthony Mundine (also boxing)
- Wally McArthur
- Nathan Merritt
- Kevin McGuinness
- PJ Marsh
- Anthony Mitchell
- Joel Moon
- Donald Malone
- Ewan McGrady
- Chris McKenna
- Caitlin Moran
- Denis Moran
- Keiran Moseley
- Shea Moylan
- Dane Nielsen
- Ken Nagas
- Jack O-Chin
- Lavina O'Mealey
- Wes Patten
- Danny Peacock
- Nathan Peats
- David Peachey
- Tyrone Peachey
- Corey Paterson
- Scott Prince
- Steve Renouf
- Amos Roberts
- James Roberts
- Tyrone Roberts
- George Rose
- Joel Romelo
- Reece Robinson
- Travis Robinson
- Will Robinson
- Ian Russell
- Chris Sandow
- Wendell Sailor (also rugby union)
- Matt Sing
- Eric Simms
- Ron Saddler
- Jamie Simpson
- Dale Shearer
- Jamie Soward
- Aiden Sezer
- Craig Salvatori
- Colin Scott
- John Simon
- Taleena Simon
- Will Smith
- Bruce Stewart
- Corey Stewart
- Johnathan Thurston
- Joel Thompson
- Ray Thompson
- Gorden Tallis
- Timana Tahu (also rugby union)
- Brad Tighe
- Sam Thaiday
- Milton Thaiday (also rugby union)
- Willie Tonga
- Esi Tonga
- Craig Trindall
- Darrell Trindall
- Albert Torrens
- Travis Waddell
- Daniel Wagon
- Ricky Walford
- Andrew Walker (also rugby union)
- Shannon Walker (also rugby union)
- Luke Walsh
- Palmer Wapau
- Derrick Watkins
- Carl Webb
- Brent Webb
- Rhys Wesser
- Dean Widders
- Jack Wighton
- Ty Williams
- Joe Williams (also boxing)
- Richard Williams
- Jonathan Wright
- Jharal Yow Yeh
- Kevin Yow Yeh

== Rugby union ==
- Richie Arnold
- Rory Arnold
- Kurtley Beale
- Nathan Blacklock
- Burnum Burnum
- Will Chambers
- Matt Hodgson
- Gary Ella
- Glen Ella
- Mark Ella
- Anthony Fainga'a
- Colby Fainga'a
- Saia Fainga'a
- Harrison Goddard
- Frank Ivory
- Lloyd McDermott, second Indigenous player to represent Australia.
- Andy Muirhead
- John Porch
- Cecil Ramalli, now acknowledged as the first Indigenous Wallaby in 1938 according to the ARU.
- Moses Sorovi
- Timana Tahu
- Milton Thaiday
- Andrew Walker
- Shannon Walker
- Jim Williams

== Rugby Sevens ==
- Bo de la Cruz
- Maurice Longbottom
- Mahalia Murphy
- John Porch
- Taleena Simon
- Tanisha Staton
- Shannon Walker

== Swimming ==
- Ben Austin
- Samantha Riley

== Tennis ==
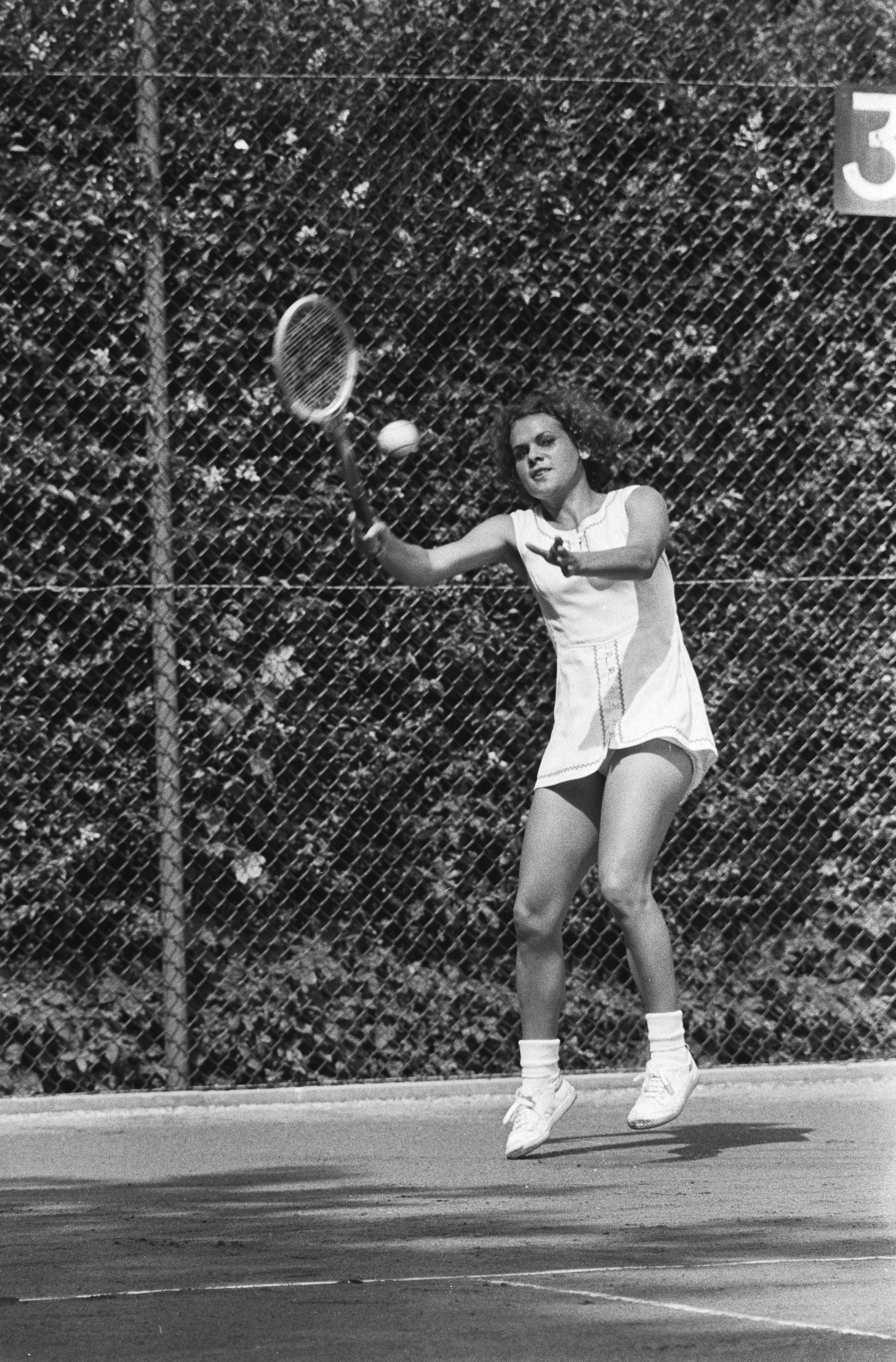
Evonne Goolagong

- Ashleigh Barty
- Evonne Goolagong, won 7 Grand Slam Singles titles, they were all in the open era.

== See also ==
- Indigenous Australian Paralympians
- Indigenous Australian Olympians
