= ProMX =

Premier Australian Motocross series

The ProMX Motocross Championship (known for sponsorship reasons as the Penrite ProMX Motocross Championship), is the premier Australian Motocross series, sanctioned by Motorcycling Australia. The series runs throughout autumn and winter, before the Supercross stadium series in spring, and features three classes; the premier class MX1, MX2, and MX3, which also features junior riders. An MXW class for women is also part of the series.

== History ==
The series has been held under various names, such as the MX Nationals and Australian Motocross Championship, since the 20th century.

The ProMX series began in 2021, however this season was cut short by the COVID-19 pandemic.

The series returned in 2022, with eight rounds across the country.

== Attendance and media ==
=== Attendance ===
Races are typically attended by crowds between 3000 and 5000 people, depending on where the event is being staged and which classes are competing. Many venues are located in regional centres, where the sport tends to be more popular due to the terrain being more friendly to the sport.

=== Broadcast ===
==== Australia ====
MX1	MX2	MX3
SBS; Stan Sport (both motos)	ProMX Livestream (first moto), SBS; Stan Sport (second moto)	ProMX Livestream (first moto), SBS; Stan Sport (second moto)

==== International ====
Select races are also broadcast on Sky Sport in New Zealand.

The ProMX livestream is also available overseas, showing the MX3 and MX2 first motos.

== 2023 season ==
In 2023, there will be a total of eight events across four different states. All events except the fourth round and the final round are one-day meets.

=== 2023 calendar ===
Event	Location	Date
(Victoria (state)) Wonthaggi National	Wonthaggi, Victoria	5 March
(New South Wales) Appin National	Appin, New South Wales	19 March
(Victoria (state)) Wodonga National	Wodonga, Victoria	April 16
(New South Wales) Maitland National	Maitland, New South Wales	May 6–7
(South Australia) Gillman National	Adelaide, South Australia	May 28
(Queensland) Toowoomba National	Toowoomba, Queensland	June 25
(Queensland) QLD Moto Park	Scenic Rim, Queensland	August 13
(Queensland) Coolum National	Coolum, Queensland	August 19–20

== List of Champions ==
Season	MX1 Champion	MX2 Champion	MX3 Champion
2026	(Australia) Jed Beaton (Yamaha)	(Australia) Alex Larwood (Honda)	(New Zealand) Hayden Draper (Yamaha)
2025	(Australia) Kyle Webster (Honda)	(New Zealand) Brodie Connolly (Honda)	(Australia) Kayd Kingsford (Honda)
2024	(Australia) Kyle Webster (Honda)	(New Zealand) Brodie Connolly (Honda)	(Australia) Jake Cannon (Honda)
2023	(Australia) Dean Ferris (Yamaha)	(Australia) Wilson Todd (Honda)	(Australia) Byron Dennis (Gas Gas)
2022	(Australia) Aaron Tanti (Yamaha)	(Australia) Wilson Todd (Honda)	(Australia) Kayden Minear (KTM)
2021	(Australia) Luke Clout (Yamaha)	(Australia) Kyle Webster (Honda)	(Australia) Blake Fox (Gas Gas)
2020	Cancelled due to COVID-19 pandemic		
2019	(Australia) Todd Waters (Husqvarna)	(Australia) Wilson Todd (Husqvarna)	(Australia) Regan Duffy (KTM)
2018	(Australia) Dean Ferris (Yamaha)	(Australia) Wilson Todd (Yamaha)	(Australia) Bailey Malkiewicz (Yamaha)
2017	(Australia) Dean Ferris (Yamaha)	(Australia) Egan Mastin (KTM)	(Australia) Cody Dyce (Yamaha)
2016	(Australia) Dean Ferris (Yamaha)	(Australia) Jed Beaton (Yamaha)	(Australia) Mitchell Evans (Yamaha)
2015	(Australia) Kirk Gibbs (KTM)	(Australia) Jay Wilson (Yamaha)	(Australia) Wilson Todd (Yamaha)
2014	(Australia) Matt Moss (Suzuki)	(Australia) Luke Clout (Yamaha)	(Australia) Egan Mastin (Husqvarna)
2013	(Australia) Matt Moss (Suzuki)	(Australia) Luke Styke (Yamaha)	(New Zealand) Hamish Harwood (KTM)
2012	(New Zealand) Josh Coppins (Yamaha)	(Australia) Ford Dale (Honda)	(New Zealand) Kayne Lamont (KTM)
2011	(Australia) Jay Marmont (Yamaha)	(Australia) Matt Moss (KTM)	(Australia) Erol Willis (Suzuki)
2010	(Australia) Jay Marmont (Yamaha)	(United States) PJ Larsen (KTM)	(Australia) Joshua Cachia (KTM)
2009	(Australia) Jay Marmont (Yamaha)	(Australia) Matt Moss (Suzuki)	(Australia) Luke Styke (Yamaha)
2008	(Australia) Jay Marmont (Yamaha)	(Australia) Luke George (Kawasaki)	(Australia) Tye Simmonds
2007	(Australia) Dan Reardon (Kawasaki)	(Australia) Jake Moss (Yamaha)	(Australia) Brendan Harrison
2006	(Australia) Craig Anderson (Honda)	(Australia) Ryan Marmont (KTM)	-
2005	(New Zealand) Daryl Hurley (Suzuki)	(Australia) Cameron Taylor (Yamaha)	-
2004	(New Zealand) Darryl King (Yamaha)	(New Zealand) Cody Cooper (Honda)	-
2003	(New Zealand) Darryl King (Yamaha)	(Australia) Troy Carroll (Yamaha)	-
2002	(Australia) Craig Anderson (KTM)	(Australia) Troy Dorron (Honda)	-
		125cc Champion	
2001	(New Zealand) Darryl King (Yamaha)	(Australia) Troy Carroll (Yamaha)	-
	250cc Champion		500cc Champion
2000	(Australia) Andrew McFarlane	(Australia) Kim Ashkenazi (Yamaha)	(Australia) Peter Melton
1999	(Australia) Andrew McFarlane	(Australia) Troy Dorron	(Australia) Peter Melton
1998	(Australia) Craig Anderson (KTM)	(Australia) Michael Byrne	(Australia) Jamie Cunningham
1997	(Australia) Craig Anderson (KTM)	(Australia) Troy Carroll (Honda)	(Australia) Ian Cunningham
1996	(Australia) Peter Melton (Kawasaki)	(Australia) Dale Britton (Yamaha)	(Australia) Shane Watts
1995	(Australia) Kim Ashkenazi (Suzuki)	(Australia) Michael Cook (Yamaha)	(Australia) Steven Andrew
1994	(Australia) Kim Ashkenazi (Suzuki)	(Australia) Joel Elliot (Kawasaki)	(Australia) Lee Hogan
1993	(Australia) Lee Hogan (Honda)	(Australia) Cameron Taylor (Yamaha)	(Australia) Kim Ashkenazi
1992	(Australia) Kim Ashkenazi (Suzuki)	(Australia) Kim Ashkenazi	(Australia) Kim Ashkenazi
1991	(Australia) Craig Dack (Yamaha)	(Australia) Glen Bell	(Australia) Glen Bell
1990	(Australia) Craig Dack (Yamaha)	(Australia) Steven Andrew (Yamaha)	(Australia) Glen Bell
1989	(United States) Eddie Warren	(Australia) Glen Bell	(United States) Eddie Warren
1988	(Australia) Jeff Leisk (Honda)	(Australia) Jeff Leisk (Honda)	(Australia) Jeff Leisk
1987	(Australia) Craig Dack (Honda)	(Australia) Glen Bell (Yamaha)	(Australia) Craig Dack
1986	(Australia) Vaughan Style	(Australia) Glen Bell	(Australia) Craig Dack
1985	(United States) Jimmy Ellis (Yamaha)	(United States) Jimmy Ellis (Yamaha)	(Australia) Trevor Williams
1984	(Australia) Jeff Leisk	(Australia) Glen Bell	(United States) Jimmy Ellis
1983	(Australia) Stephen Gall	(Australia) Glen Bell	(Australia) Trevor Williams
1982	(Australia) Stephen Gall (Yamaha)	(Australia) Ray Vandenburg (Suzuki)	(Australia) Jeff Leisk
1981	(Australia) Stephen Gall (Yamaha)	(Australia) Jeff Leisk	(Australia) Anthony Gunter
1980	(Australia) Stephen Gall	(Australia) Peter Carney	(Australia) Trevor Williams
1979	(Sweden) Pelle Granquist (Husqvarna)	(Australia) Shane Kirkpatrick (Husqvarna)	(Sweden) Pelle Granquist
1978	(Sweden) Pelle Granquist (Husqvarna)	(Australia) Michael Landman (Yamaha)	(Sweden) Pelle Granquist
1977	(Australia) Anthony Gunter	(Australia) Darryl Willoughby	(Australia) Graeme Smythe
1976	(Australia) Michael Landman	(Australia) Steve Cramer	(Australia) Geoff Worrell
1975	(Belgium) Gaston Rahier (Suzuki)	(Belgium) Gaston Rahier (Suzuki)	(Australia) Steve Cramer
1974	(Australia) Gary Flood (Bultaco)	(Australia) Brian Martin (Honda)	(Australia) Gary Flood
1973	(Denmark) Per Klitland	(Australia) Gary Flood	(Australia) Trevor Flood
1972	(Australia) Trevor Flood	(Australia) Edward Lancaster	(Australia) Trevor Flood
1971	(Australia) David Basham (ČZ)	(Australia) David Basham (ČZ)	(New Zealand) Ivan Miller
1970	(Australia) Gary Adams	(Australia) Gary Flood	(Australia) Michael Groom
1969	(Australia) Gary Flood (Bultaco)	(Australia) Gary Flood (Bultaco)	(Australia) Gary Flood
1968	(Australia) Rob Voumard (Yamaha)	(Australia) Ray Fisher (Kawasaki)	(Australia) David Basham
1967	(Australia) Matt Daley (Husqvarna)	(Australia) Leon Street (Bultaco)	(Australia) Ray Fisher
1966	(Australia) Graham Burford (ČZ)	(Australia) Ray Owen (Bultaco)	(Australia) Ray Fisher
1965	(Australia) Graham Burford	(Australia) Ian Gaff (Bultaco)	(Australia) Ray Fisher
1964	(Australia) Ian Gaff	(Australia) Stan Jones (BSA)	(Australia) Geoff Taylor
1963	(Australia) Bob O'Leary (Cotton)	(Australia) Stan Jones (BSA)	(Australia) Bob O'Leary
1962	(Australia) Gordon Renfree	-	(Australia) Alan Nichol
1961	(Australia) Charlie West	(Australia) Ray Dole	(Australia) Les Fisher
1960	(Australia) Gordon Renfree (BSA)	(Australia) Charlie May (BSA)	(Australia) Ken Rumble
1959	(Australia) Alan Nichol	(Australia) Stan Jones	(Australia) Ray Fisher
1958	(Australia) Alan Atkins (Puch)	(Australia) Alan Lee (BSA)	(Australia) Jim Silvy
1957	(Australia) George Bailey	(Australia) Ken Richards	-
1956	(Australia) George Bailey (Bailey Special)	(Australia) George Bailey	(Australia) George Bailey
1955	(Australia) John Rock (Francis-Barnett)	-	(Australia) Ron Edwards
1954	(Australia) Ray Wall	(Australia) Ken Rumble	(Australia) Charlie May
1953	(Australia) Ken Rumble (BSA)	(Australia) Ken Rumble (BSA)	-
