= 2025 ProMX Championship =

Australian Motocross Championship in 2025

The 2025 ProMX Motocross Championship season (known for sponsorship reasons as the Penrite ProMX Motocross Championship presented by AMX Superstores), was the fifth Australian Motocross Championship season under the ProMX moniker.

The series included eight rounds across four different states and the Australian Capital Territory. All events except the first round and the final round are a one-day format.

Kyle Webster went into the season as the defending champion in the MX1 class, after winning his second senior national title in the previous season. After another championship battle with Jed Beaton, Webster was able to become champion for the second year running, with Beaton missing the last two rounds due to injury. New Zealand's Brodie Connolly won his first ProMX title in 2024 and was successful in his attempt to defend it in the MX2 class.

The second MX1 race at the third round in Gillman was stopped with no result being declared following a crash for Joel Evans. Evans later succumbed to his injuries after reaching hospital.

The sixth round of the championship was originally scheduled to take place at the Nowra track in New South Wales, but was later moved to Canberra.

== Race calendar and results ==
=== MX1 ===
Round	Date	Location	Race 1 Winner	Race 2 Winner	Round Winner
1	22–23 March	(Victoria (state)) Wonthaggi	(Australia) Kyle Webster	(Australia) Jed Beaton	(Australia) Jed Beaton
2	13 April	(New South Wales) Appin	(Australia) Kyle Webster	(Australia) Kyle Webster	(Australia) Kyle Webster
3	27 April	(South Australia) Gillman	(Australia) Kyle Webster	Race Abandoned	(Australia) Kyle Webster
4	25 May	(Victoria (state)) Traralgon	(Australia) Jed Beaton	(Australia) Kyle Webster	(Australia) Kyle Webster
5	22 June	(Queensland) Warwick	(Australia) Jed Beaton	(Australia) Kyle Webster	(Australia) Jed Beaton
6	6 July	(Australian Capital Territory) Canberra	(Australia) Jed Beaton	(Australia) Jed Beaton	(Australia) Jed Beaton
7	27 July	(Queensland) Toowoomba	(Australia) Kyle Webster	(Australia) Wilson Todd	(Australia) Kyle Webster
8	2–3 August	(Queensland) QLD Moto Park	(Australia) Nathan Crawford	(Australia) Wilson Todd	(Australia) Wilson Todd

=== MX2 ===
Round	Date	Location	Race 1 Winner	Race 2 Winner	Round Winner
1	22–23 March	(Victoria (state)) Wonthaggi	(New Zealand) Brodie Connolly	(New Zealand) Brodie Connolly	(New Zealand) Brodie Connolly
2	13 April	(New South Wales) Appin	(New Zealand) Brodie Connolly	(Australia) Ryder Kingsford	(Australia) Ryder Kingsford
3	27 April	(South Australia) Gillman	(New Zealand) Brodie Connolly	(Australia) Ryder Kingsford	(Australia) Ryder Kingsford
4	25 May	(Victoria (state)) Traralgon	(New Zealand) Brodie Connolly	(New Zealand) Brodie Connolly	(New Zealand) Brodie Connolly
5	22 June	(Queensland) Warwick	(New Zealand) Brodie Connolly	(Australia) Alex Larwood	(Australia) Alex Larwood
6	6 July	(Australian Capital Territory) Canberra	(New Zealand) Brodie Connolly	(New Zealand) Brodie Connolly	(New Zealand) Brodie Connolly
7	27 July	(Queensland) Toowoomba	(New Zealand) Brodie Connolly	(New Zealand) Brodie Connolly	(New Zealand) Brodie Connolly
8	2–3 August	(Queensland) QLD Moto Park	(Australia) Noah Ferguson	(New Zealand) Brodie Connolly	(Australia) Noah Ferguson

=== Circuit locations ===
2025 ProMX Championship locations

== MX1 ==
=== Participants ===
Team	Constructor	No	Rider	Rounds
Team HRC Honda Racing Australia	Honda	1	(Australia) Kyle Webster	All
Team HRC Honda Racing Australia	Honda	6	(Australia) Wilson Todd	All
KTM Racing Team	KTM	3	(Australia) Nathan Crawford	All
KTM Racing Team	KTM	5	(Australia) Kirk Gibbs	All
Penrite Racing Empire Kawasaki	Kawasaki	4	(Australia) Luke Clout	All
Rising Motorsports Racing Team	Triumph	8	(Australia) Zachary Watson	All
Monster Energy CDR Yamaha Team	Yamaha	9	(Australia) Aaron Tanti	7–8
Monster Energy CDR Yamaha Team	Yamaha	14	(Australia) Jed Beaton	1–6
Monster Energy CDR Yamaha Team	Yamaha	145	(New Zealand) Maximus Purvis	1–4
Rising Motorsports	Triumph	12	(Australia) Jack Byrne	1–2
Winner Triumph Racing Australia	Triumph	17	(Australia) Jack Simpson	All
Winner Triumph Racing Australia	Triumph	19	(Australia) Connar Adams	8
Winner Triumph Racing Australia	Triumph	71	(Australia) Seth Jackson	1–3
SFC Racing/MX Farm Queensland	Yamaha	20	(Australia) Jesse Bishop	2
	Yamaha	22	(Australia) Levi Sayer	2, 7–8
Steelo's Transport	Yamaha	23	(Australia) Brandon Steel	All
Pro Honda/Honda Racing Australia	Honda	25	(Australia) Liam Jackson	1–3, 5–8
Ride Red Honda	Honda	27	(Australia) Liam Atkinson	1
Lusty Industries/MX Express/Truckserv	Yamaha	28	(Australia) Cooper Holroyd	2, 6
2NINE Motorsports	Honda	29	(Australia) Navrin Grothues	5, 8
R31 MX & Adventure	Kawasaki	31	(Australia) James Davison	2, 6
Team Green/Mick Muldoon Motorcycles	Kawasaki	32	(Australia) Joel Cigliano	All
Caloundra Motorcycle Centre	Yamaha	34	(Australia) Levi Rogers	All
Team Green Kawasaki Australia	Kawasaki	36	(Australia) Zane Mackintosh	4–5
	Honda	37	(Australia) Jordan Hovey	8
Bulk Nutrients Echuca Yamaha	Yamaha	38	(Australia) Bryce Ognenis	All
Brisbane Motorcycles/J&M Orchard Carpentry	Yamaha	40	(Australia) Kye Orchard	2, 5–6, 8
Aektiv MX/ShockTreatment Suspension	KTM	42	(Australia) Brock Ninness	2
Northstar Yamaha	Yamaha	43	(Australia) Kobe Drew	1
	Yamaha	44	(Australia) Jai Constantinou	7–8
Ramcorp/Bell/Oneal/Terry Crew Co	KTM	46	(Australia) Hugh McKay	1–2, 7–8
Raceline Husqvarna TDub Racing Team	Husqvarna	47	(Australia) Todd Waters	All
Raceline Husqvarna TDub Racing Team	Husqvarna	72	(Australia) Regan Duffy	1–4, 8
Underclass/Link Logic/Agflow Solutions	Yamaha	49	(Australia) Cody O'Loan	All
Lusty Industries	KTM	52	(Australia) Jyle Campbell	2, 6
Lusty Industries	Stark	53	(Australia) Samuel Hardman	2
Honda Genuine Ride Red	Honda	56	(Australia) Riley Stephens	1, 8
Ellroy Pty Ltd/BLS Suspension	KTM	60	(Australia) Royce Anell	3–4
JR Factory Services/Sunstate Motorcycles	Husqvarna	63	(Australia) Axel Widdon	7
Pro Honda Ride Red	Honda	76	(Australia) Hixson McInnes	6
Alpine Motorcycles/BLS Suspension	Yamaha	79	(Australia) Jacob Sweet	All
MXStore/Viking Industrial	Kawasaki	81	(Australia) Joel Evans	1–3
Ride Red Privateer Program	Honda	84	(Australia) Siegah Ward	1–4
Blackdog Custom/BLS Suspension	Husqvarna	88	(Australia) Riley Fucsko	3–4
Ballina Motorcycles/Hostile Handwear	KTM	92	(Australia) Brock Smith	7–8
	Triumph	100	(Australia) Daniel Simpson	3–4
	Yamaha	100	(Australia) Allister Kent	8
David Garry Automotive	Yamaha	121	(Australia) Thomas Wood	5–8
Honda Ride Red/Choice Suspension	Honda	124	(Australia) Chandler Burns	1–5, 7–8
Matt Jones Motorcycles/Race Ready Suspension	Kawasaki	136	(Australia) Max Closter	1
WeAreLusty/Maxima Oils	Husqvarna	152	(Australia) James Alen	7
Peter Stevens/JCP/Krooztune	Yamaha	154	(Australia) Kade Dunscombe	1
Thor/Michelin/Rock Oil/Motorcycles 'R Us	KTM	185	(Australia) Ryley Fitzpatrick	8
HSC Global/Apro Motorsports	KTM	202	(Australia) Connor Rossandich	All
Allwest Motorcycles	Husqvarna	217	(Australia) Patrick Martin	6
Team Moto Enoggera	Yamaha	260	(Australia) Jacob Miller	7
City MX/Go Karts Go	Yamaha	273	(Australia) Cody Atteridge	3
Newcastle Powersports	KTM	415	(Australia) Cody Schat	5, 8
Mototech Mildura/Mallee Physio/Maher's Glassworks	KTM	428	(Australia) Mackenie O'Bree	7–8
Northstar Yamaha	Yamaha	559	(Australia) Damon Erbacher	5, 8
	Yamaha	737	(Australia) Ben McNevin	5, 7–8
	KTM	805	(Australia) Brock Lindsay	6
JRS Motorcycles	Husqvarna	893	(Australia) Bradley Ace	8

=== Riders Championship ===
Points are awarded to finishers of the main races, in the following format:

Position	1st	2nd	3rd	4th	5th	6th	7th	8th	9th	10th	11th	12th	13th	14th	15th	16th	17th	18th	19th	20th
Points	25	22	20	18	16	15	14	13	12	11	10	9	8	7	6	5	4	3	2	1

Pos	Rider	Bike	WON (Victoria (state))		APP (New South Wales)		GIL (South Australia)		TRA (Victoria (state))		WAR (Queensland)		CAN (Australian Capital Territory)		TOO (Queensland)		QLD (Queensland)		Points
1	(Australia) Kyle Webster	Honda	1	Ret	1	1	1	Abn	2	1	3	1	3	5	1	3	3	2	315
2	(Australia) Nathan Crawford	KTM	6	2	4	4	3	Abn	4	4	2	3	2	3	2	2	1	4	300
3	(Australia) Wilson Todd	Honda	5	10	8	5	8	Abn	5	5	6	4	4	2	4	1	2	1	264
4	(Australia) Jed Beaton	Yamaha	2	1	2	2	2	Abn	1	2	1	2	1	1					257
5	(Australia) Zachary Watson	Triumph	7	7	11	8	10	Abn	6	3	4	6	7	6	6	5	4	5	224
6	(Australia) Kirk Gibbs	KTM	10	3	5	Ret	4	Abn	7	6	8	8	5	7	5	8	Ret	7	193
7	(Australia) Levi Rogers	Yamaha	8	6	6	6	7	Abn	11	14	9	9	9	15	8	Ret	6	3	179
8	(Australia) Luke Clout	Kawasaki	4	4	3	3	5	Abn	DNS	DNS	7	5	8	Ret	3	4	Ret	DNS	173
9	(Australia) Todd Waters	Husqvarna	26	5	7	9	6	Abn	8	7	5	7	6	4	Ret	6	Ret	DNS	162
10	(Australia) Bryce Ognenis	Yamaha	12	17	15	11	17	Abn	13	8	11	11	10	10	16	16	10	16	122
11	(Australia) Cody O'Loan	Yamaha	17	12	21	14	18	Abn	15	10	12	10	12	9	11	13	12	10	119
12	(Australia) Liam Jackson	Honda	11	16	9	Ret	Ret	Abn			10	12	13	Ret	9	9	9	14	98
13	(Australia) Regan Duffy	Husqvarna	9	8	10	16	11	Abn	9	9							7	15	95
14	(Australia) Jack Simpson	Triumph	20	18	16	12	13	Abn	12	13	14	13	14	8	13	15	Ret	DNS	92
15	(Australia) Hugh McKay	KTM	14	13	12	10									12	11	8	8	80
16	(Australia) Jacob Sweet	Yamaha	22	15	18	15	16	Abn	14	12	22	22	21	13	14	14	13	11	76
17	(Australia) Connor Rossandich	KTM	19	Ret	19	17	15	Abn	16	Ret	13	18	11	14	10	10	16	Ret	74
18	(New Zealand) Maximus Purvis	Yamaha	3	9	DNS	DNS	9	Abn	3	Ret									64
19	(Australia) Chandler Burns	Honda	13	14	17	13	21	Abn	10	11	15	14			19	Ret	25	20	64
20	(Australia) Aaron Tanti	Yamaha													7	7	5	6	59
21	(Australia) Joel Evans^{†}	Kawasaki	16	11	14	7	12	Abn^{†}											45
22	(Australia) Brandon Steel	Yamaha	25	22	25	21	19	Abn	18	17	18	15	18	18	17	17	19	18	37
23	(Australia) Jai Constantinou	Yamaha													15	12	14	9	34
24	(Australia) Joel Cigliano	Kawasaki	23	21	24	22	20	Abn	17	16	17	17	19	16	20	19	22	17	32
25	(Australia) Cooper Holroyd	Yamaha			13	18							15	11					27
26	(Australia) Ryley Fitzpatrick	KTM															11	13	18
27	(Australia) Mackenzie O'Bree	KTM													18	DNS	15	12	18
28	(Australia) Siegah Ward	Honda	21	20	22	20	14	Abn	19	15									17
29	(Australia) Jyle Campbell	KTM			20	19							17	12					16
30	(Australia) Cody Schat	KTM									16	16					24	DNS	10
31	(Australia) Damon Erbacher	Yamaha									19	21					17	19	8
32	(Australia) Kobe Drew	Yamaha	15	Ret															6
33	(Australia) Hixson McInnes	Honda											16	Ret					5
34	(Australia) Patrick Martin	Husqvarna											20	17					5
35	(Australia) Liam Atkinson	Honda	18	19															5
36	(Australia) Daniel Simpson	Triumph					24	Abn	20	18									4
37	(Australia) Kye Orchard	Yamaha			28	26					20	19	22	20			21	25	4
38	(Australia) Connar Adams	Triumph															18	23	3
39	(Australia) Axel Widdon	Husqvarna													21	18			3
40	(Australia) James Davison	Kawasaki			30	29							23	19					2
41	(Australia) Zane Mackintosh	Kawasaki							21	19	23	Ret							2
42	(Australia) Navrin Grothues	Honda									21	20					20	21	2
43	(Australia) James Alen	Husqvarna													22	20			1
	(Australia) Thomas Wood	Yamaha									24	23	24	21	26	23	DNS	DNS	0
	(Australia) Brock Smith	KTM													25	21	28	26	0
	(Australia) Seth Jackson	Triumph	24	23	29	25	22	Abn											0
	(Australia) Allister Kent	Yamaha															23	22	0
	(Australia) Ben McNevin	Yamaha									25	24			27	22	DNS	DNS	0
	(Australia) Jesse Bishop	Yamaha			23	24													0
	(Australia) Levi Sayer	Yamaha			26	28									23	DNS	Ret	DNS	0
	(Australia) Brock Ninness	KTM			27	23													0
	(Australia) Riley Fucsko	Husqvarna					23	Abn	Ret	Ret									0
	(Australia) Jacob Miller	Yamaha													24	24			0
	(Australia) Riley Stephens	Honda	27	25													26	24	0
	(Australia) Max Closter	Kawasaki	28	24															0
	(Australia) Royce Anell	KTM					25	Abn	Ret	DNS									0
	(Australia) Brock Lindsay	KTM											25	Ret					0
	(Australia) Cody Atteridge	Yamaha					26	Abn											0
	(Australia) Jack Byrne	Triumph	Ret	Ret	31	27													0
	(Australia) Jordan Hovey	Honda															27	DNS	0
	(Australia) Bradley Ace	Husqvarna															29	Ret	0
	(Australia) Samuel Hardman	Stark			Ret	Ret													0
	(Australia) Kade Dunscombe	Yamaha	DNS	DNS															0
Pos	Rider	Bike	WON (Victoria (state))		APP (New South Wales)		GIL (South Australia)		TRA (Victoria (state))		WAR (Queensland)		CAN (Australian Capital Territory)		TOO (Queensland)		QLD (Queensland)		Points

== MX2 ==
=== Participants ===
Team	Constructor	No	Rider	Rounds
Team HRC Honda Racing Australia	Honda	1	(New Zealand) Brodie Connolly	All
Team HRC Honda Racing Australia	Honda	5	(Australia) Alex Larwood	All
Team HRC Honda Racing Australia	Honda	17	(Australia) Charli Cannon	2
KTM Racing Team	KTM	6	(Australia) Byron Dennis	All
KTM Racing Team	KTM	29	(Australia) Noah Ferguson	All
Monster Energy Yamalube Yamaha	Yamaha	7	(Australia) Jayce Cosford	All
Monster Energy Yamalube Yamaha	Yamaha	21	(Australia) Ryder Kingsford	All
Penrite Racing GO24 Team Green Kawasaki Australia	Kawasaki	8	(Australia) Cambell Williams	6–8
Penrite Racing GO24 Team Green Kawasaki Australia	Kawasaki	22	(Australia) Rhys Budd	4–8
Penrite Racing GO24 Team Green Kawasaki Australia	Kawasaki	731	(United Kingdom) Alfie Jones	1–3
Rising Motorsports	Husqvarna	12	(Australia) Jack Byrne	3–6
JR Triumph Racing	Triumph	13	(Australia) Deacon Paice	All
Elliott Bros MPE	Gas Gas	14	(Australia) Jack Kenney	1–6
QB4 Bikes & 4WD/Carwash Express	Kawasaki	16	(Australia) Kaleb Barham	2–8
Bulk Nutrients Echuca Yamaha	Yamaha	18	(Australia) Seth Burchell	1–4, 6–8
Bulk Nutrients Echuca Yamaha	Yamaha	223	(Australia) Tristan Owen	1–3, 5–8
Winner Triumph Racing Australia	Triumph	19	(Australia) Connar Adams	1–5, 8
Winner Triumph Racing Australia	Triumph	38	(Australia) Thynan Kean	All
Raceline Husqvarna TDub Racing Team	Husqvarna	22	(Australia) Rhys Budd	1–2
Peter Stevens/Moto Cred	KTM	25	(Australia) Regan Holyoak	1
	KTM	28	(Australia) Isaac Ferguson	2
Caloundra Motorcycle Centre	Yamaha	31	(Australia) Joel Phillips	1–3, 5, 7–8
Team Green Kawasaki Australia	Kawasaki	36	(Australia) Zane Mackintosh	3
Honda Racing Australia/Honda Motorcycles	Honda	37	(Australia) Blake Haidley	3, 8
Honda Motul Racing New Zealand	Honda	41	(New Zealand) Curtis King	4–8
Honda Motul Racing New Zealand	Honda	110	(New Zealand) Rian King	2–8
Honda Motul Racing New Zealand	Honda	714	(New Zealand) Cobie Bourke	All
Elliott Bros/Mallee Physio/Maher's Glassworks	Gas Gas	43	(Australia) Mackenzie O'Bree	3–4
Wood & Co Living/Rapid Auto Repair Goulburn	Honda	49	(Australia) Mitchell Drapalski	6
LCH/Monster Energy Army	Yamaha	50	(Australia) Jason West	2, 5
JR Factory Services/Sunstate Motorcycles	Triumph	55	(Australia) Axel Widdon	4–5
Mandurah City Yamaha	Yamaha	60	(Australia) Brock Flynn	All
Penrite Racing Empire Kawasaki	Kawasaki	62	(Australia) Ryan Alexanderson	1–2
	KTM	65	(Australia) Connor Whitney	6
	Honda	74	(Australia) Bradley Baling	6
Raceline/TDub/Brisbane Motorcycles	Husqvarna	75	(Australia) Jack Kukas	All
00Elite Rider Training	Honda	92	(Australia) Heath Groundwater	1–7
Case Vic/Thor/Michelin	KTM	120	(Australia) Matthew Peluso	1–2
Mendid/Triumph Australia	Triumph	121	(Australia) Jai Cornwall	1–5
R31 MX & Adventure	Kawasaki	131	(Australia) James Davison	1, 3
Pro-Moto/JMG/Maitland Motorcycles	Honda	134	(Australia) Cayden Gray	2
Team Green/Powersports Kawasaki	Kawasaki	143	(Australia) Thomas Gadsden	1–4, 6
Bulk Nutrients/MotoGo Yamaha	Yamaha	151	(Australia) Aiden Bloom	1–2, 4, 6
WBR Echuca/Bob Medson Refrigeration	Yamaha	155	(Australia) Nicholas Medson	All
Lucas Civil/NGE Electrics	Yamaha	174	(Australia) Sam Larsen	All
MSC Moto	KTM	185	(Australia) Ryley Fitzpatrick	1–6
	Honda	191	(Australia) Jordan Howard	1–2, 4–5, 7–8
Allwest Motorcycles	Husqvarna	217	(Australia) Patrick Martin	1–4, 8
Suttos/KTM Australia/Weare Lusty	KTM	222	(Australia) Rory Fairbrother	2
B&R Brakes Castle Hill	KTM	225	(Australia) Reid Lehrer	2, 6, 8
	KTM	237	(Australia) Fletcher Reid	6
Rising Motorsports	Triumph	275	(Australia) Travis Olander	1–4, 7–8
WBR Motorcycles/Fox Racing Australia	Yamaha	288	(Australia) Lachlan Sands	2
Maintenance Systems/Build Tech Supplies	Husqvarna	310	(Australia) Brock Hutchins	1, 4, 6–8
CML KTM Racing	KTM	318	(New Zealand) Madoc Dixon	3–8
Yamaha NZ/JCR/Carter Coaching	Yamaha	321	(New Zealand) Cody Griffiths	2–8
Honda Dream Racing LG	Honda	386	(Japan) Haruki Yokoyama	1, 4–8
Platinum Excavation Fuelfix & Tanks2Go	KTM	394	(Australia) Rory Clements	5–6, 8
Shepparton Motorcycles	KTM	415	(Australia) Samuel Armstrong	All
Raceline/TDub/MXStore	Husqvarna	416	(Australia) Kayne Smith	1
WBR Motorcycles	Yamaha	431	(Australia) Bradley Grasso	1
Team XLR	Triumph	486	(Australia) Felicity Shrimpton	2, 4–6
Krupt Supps/Vizion Concepts	KTM	542	(Australia) Gabriel Taresch	1

=== Riders Championship ===
Points are awarded to finishers of the main races, in the following format:

Position	1st	2nd	3rd	4th	5th	6th	7th	8th	9th	10th	11th	12th	13th	14th	15th	16th	17th	18th	19th	20th
Points	25	22	20	18	16	15	14	13	12	11	10	9	8	7	6	5	4	3	2	1

Pos	Rider	Bike	WON (Victoria (state))		APP (New South Wales)		GIL (South Australia)		TRA (Victoria (state))		WAR (Queensland)		CAN (Australian Capital Territory)		TOO (Queensland)		QLD (Queensland)		Points
1	(New Zealand) Brodie Connolly	Honda	1	1	1	3	1	2	1	1	1	4	1	1	1	1	4	1	378
2	(Australia) Ryder Kingsford	Yamaha	2	2	2	1	2	1	2	2	5	3	3	12	4	3	2	2	329
3	(Australia) Noah Ferguson	KTM	5	6	7	4	4	4	5	3	3	2	2	5	2	2	1	3	304
4	(Australia) Alex Larwood	Honda	3	3	5	2	5	22	4	6	2	1	4	2	3	4	3	Ret	272
5	(Australia) Byron Dennis	KTM	4	4	6	6	3	13	3	5	4	5	5	3	14	5	5	4	257
6	(Australia) Jayce Cosford	Yamaha	6	13	9	5	6	3	6	9	6	6	6	4	12	7	DNS	DNS	199
7	(New Zealand) Cobie Bourke	Honda	7	9	12	15	9	9	15	13	7	8	8	9	6	10	8	12	179
8	(Australia) Seth Burchell	Yamaha	8	7	3	7	11	5	9	8			9	16	16	16	9	8	164
9	(Australia) Rhys Budd	Husqvarna	10	10	4	8													154
9	(Australia) Rhys Budd	Kawasaki							7	Ret	11	10	18	7	7	9	6	13	154
10	(Australia) Kaleb Barham	Kawasaki			10	11	15	10	8	Ret	Ret	13	7	8	5	8	14	5	138
11	(Japan) Haruki Yokoyama	Honda	12	Ret					11	7	8	7	10	6	8	6	Ret	6	129
12	(Australia) Brock Flynn	Yamaha	17	15	20	13	13	8	12	16	15	11	14	14	Ret	14	10	7	116
13	(Australia) Travis Olander	Triumph	Ret	8	11	12	10	7	Ret	10					9	12	12	9	110
14	(New Zealand) Madoc Dixon	KTM					12	Ret	13	11	9	9	Ret	15	10	11	7	11	102
15	(Australia) Deacon Paice	Triumph	13	Ret	Ret	17	7	6	10	4	12	Ret	12	Ret	13	17	DNS	DNS	100
16	(New Zealand) Rian King	Honda			14	10	16	23	20	12	10	24	11	11	19	13	15	15	86
17	(Australia) Jack Kukas	Husqvarna	9	11	15	Ret	8	21	18	14	Ret	12	15	Ret	17	19	16	14	84
18	(Australia) Ryley Fitzpatrick	KTM	14	14	13	14	14	11	19	15	Ret	DNS	13	17					66
19	(Australia) Ryan Alexanderson	Kawasaki	11	5	8	9													51
20	(Australia) Cambell Williams	Kawasaki											16	10	15	15	11	10	49
21	(New Zealand) Curtis King	Honda							26	24	13	23	19	13	11	18	17	17	39
22	(Australia) Thynan Kean	Triumph	28	12	21	16	21	12	24	Ret	Ret	15	20	22	18	23	20	16	39
23	(New Zealand) Cody Griffiths	Yamaha			19	18	20	20	21	19	14	18	17	18	22	20	13	23	35
24	(Australia) Nicholas Medson	Yamaha	20	17	DNS	DNS	24	Ret	16	17	18	16	22	25	25	24	18	18	28
25	(Australia) Sam Larsen	Yamaha	18	21	Ret	20	23	18	17	20	16	14	25	20	21	22	21	21	25
26	(United Kingdom) Alfie Jones	Kawasaki	15	Ret	17	19	17	15											22
27	(Australia) Mackenzie O'Bree	Gas Gas					19	17	14	18									16
28	(Australia) Heath Groundwater	Honda	16	20	25	26	Ret	DNS	22	21	17	17	Ret	DNS	Ret	DNS			14
29	(Australia) Jack Kenney	Gas Gas	24	22	23	21	22	14	Ret	Ret	19	21	21	19					11
30	(Australia) Joel Phillips	Yamaha	21	18	26	27	Ret	DNS			20	19			20	21	19	20	10
31	(Australia) Patrick Martin	Husqvarna	19	16	22	22	Ret	DNS	Ret	DNS							Ret	19	9
32	(Australia) Jack Byrne	Husqvarna					18	16	Ret	Ret	Ret	Ret	Ret	DNS					8
33	(Australia) Charli Cannon	Honda			16	23													5
34	(Australia) Isaac Ferguson	KTM			18	25													3
35	(Australia) Brock Hutchins	Husqvarna	25	19					Ret	23			23	21	23	25	DNS	DNS	2
36	(Australia) Connar Adams	Triumph	23	23	27	28	29	19	23	26	23	22					22	22	2
37	(Australia) Axel Widdon	Triumph							25	22	21	20							1
	(Australia) Jason West	Yamaha			24	24					22	Ret							0
	(Australia) Matthew Peluso	KTM	22	24	34	34													0
	(Australia) Aidan Bloom	Yamaha	30	26	28	29			28	28			24	23					0
	(Australia) Reid Lehrer	KTM			36	36							29	24			23	Ret	0
	(Australia) Jai Cornwall	Triumph	Ret	DNS	Ret	DNS	25	24	27	25	24	25							0
	(Australia) Samuel Armstrong	KTM	29	30	30	Ret	27	25	Ret	27	25	28	28	27	24	26	26	24	0
	(Australia) Rory Clements	KTM									27	26	26	26			24	Ret	0
	(Australia) Tristan Owen	Yamaha	31	27	33	30	Ret	27			26	27	27	28	Ret	DNS	25	25	0
	(Australia) James Davison	Kawasaki	27	25			26	28											0
	(Australia) Jordan Howard	Honda	DNS	34	Ret	DNS			30	30	28	29			26	27	Ret	26	0
	(Australia) Thomas Gadsden	Kawasaki	32	32	35	35	28	26	29	29			30	29					0
	(Australia) Regan Holyoak	KTM	26	28															0
	(Australia) Felicity Shrimpton	Triumph			DNQ	DNQ			31	31	29	Ret	32	Ret					0
	(Australia) Lachlan Sands	Yamaha			29	33													0
	(Australia) Kayne Smith	Husqvarna	34	29															0
	(Australia) Mitchell Drapalski	Honda											31	30					0
	(Australia) Rory Fairbrother	KTM			32	31													0
	(Australia) Cayden Gray	Honda			31	32													0
	(Australia) Bradley Grasso	Yamaha	33	31															0
	(Australia) Gabriel Taresch	KTM	35	33															0
	(Australia) Fletcher Reid	KTM											33	DNS					0
	(Australia) Bradley Baling	Honda											34	DSQ					0
	(Australia) Connor Whitney	KTM											Ret	Ret					0
	(Australia) Blake Haidley	Honda					Ret	DNS									DNS	DNS	0
	(Australia) Zane Mackintosh	Kawasaki					Ret	DNS											0
Pos	Rider	Bike	WON (Victoria (state))		APP (New South Wales)		GIL (South Australia)		TRA (Victoria (state))		WAR (Queensland)		CAN (Australian Capital Territory)		TOO (Queensland)		QLD (Queensland)		Points
