= Andrew McFarlane (motorcyclist) =

Australian motorcycle racer

- Nationality: Australian
- Born: 30 May 1977 Brisbane, Queensland
- Died: 2 May 2010 (aged 32) Broadford, Victoria

Motocross career
- Years active: 1996-2010
- Teams: Yamaha

Andrew McFarlane (30 May 1977 – 2 May 2010) was an Australian professional motocross racer. He competed in the Motocross World Championships from 2000 to 2005 and in the AMA Motocross Championships from 2006 to 2008. McFarlane's most notable result came in 2005 when, he ranked second in the MX2 world championship. He was also a member of seven Australian Motocross des Nations teams.

McFarlane died in 2010 of injuries sustained in an accident while practicing for a race. His international racing career along with those of Jeff Leisk and Chad Reed helped focus attention on Australian motocross talent and, helped to pave the way for more Australian motorcyclists to compete in both Europe and the United States.

== Motocross racing career ==
McFarlane was originally from Brisbane, Queensland, Australia where, he began to ride motorcycles at the age of 6. In 1996, he won both the 125cc and 250cc classes of the Australian Supercross Championship and then, won the 1999 Australian Motocross Championship on a privateer Yamaha. He joined the Kawasaki Racing team in 2000 and successfully defended his national championship title and also won the Supercross Masters championship.

McFarlane rose to international prominence at the first ever Australian round of the Motocross World Championship in 2000 when, he gained the holeshot and led a field of top international riders for 20 minutes on a Kawasaki. He eventually finished in fourth place but, his performance highlighted the level of talent in Australian motocross. McFarlane won his first world championship Grand Prix race on 13 June 2004 at the Italian Grand Prix. In 2005 he joined the Yamaha factory racing team run by 1984 world champion Michele Rinaldi. He improved on his previous result by winning three Grand Prix races and was the runner up to Antonio Cairoli in the FIM MX2 Motocross World Championship.

McFarlane moved to the United States to compete for the Yamaha of Troy motocross team in the AMA motocross national championship. He scored third-place finishes at the Hangtown Motocross National and at the Red Bud MX rounds along with four fourth-place finishes to end the season ranked seventh in the MX-Lites class for 250cc motorcycles. McFarlane rode for Suzuki in 2007 and Kawasaki in 2008 but, he fell out of the top ten while suffering injuries.

McFarlane returned to Australia to compete in the 2009 Australian Motocross Championship season where, he finished the year ranked third on privateer Yamaha. McFarlane's final overall victory came at Canberra's second round of the 2009 championship. He announced that the 2010 season would be his final year in competition before taking a race team management role, but died of injuries sustained on 2 May 2010 in an accident during a practice lap at the third round of the 2010 Australian Motocross Championship at the Broadford Track in Broadford, north of Melbourne, Australia. He was 32-years-old. He was married and had one daughter.
