= Justin Doyle =

Australian rugby league footballer

Personal information
- Full name: Justin Doyle
- Born: 6 April 1978 (age 47) Armidale, New South Wales, Australia

Playing information
- Position: Prop
Club
| Years | Team | Pld | T | G | FG | P |
|---|---|---|---|---|---|---|
| 1998–99 | South Sydney | 14 | 0 | 0 | 0 | 0 |
| 2000 | Wests Tigers | 8 | 1 | 0 | 0 | 4 |
| | Total | 22 | 1 | 0 | 0 | 4 |
Representative
| Years | Team | Pld | T | G | FG | P |
| 1999 | Australian Indigenous |

Justin Doyle (born 6 April 1978) is an Australian former professional rugby league footballer who played in the 1990s and 2000s, in the Australasian National Rugby League (NRL) for the South Sydney Rabbitohs in 1998 and 1999 before moving to the Wests Tigers in 2000.

Born in Armidale, New South Wales, he came to Sydney on a scholarship with South Sydney Rugby League club before moving to the Wests Tigers in 2000.

He represented the Australian Indigenous Team in 1999.
