= Milton Thaiday =

Australian Rugby player (born 1980)

- Born: Milton Lameski Thaiday; 15 February 1980 (age 46) Townsville, Queensland, Australia
- Height: 178 cm (5 ft 10 in)
- Weight: 78 kg (12 st 4 lb)
- Notable relative: Sam Thaiday (cousin)

Rugby union career
- Position: Fullback
Super Rugby
Years	Team	Apps	(Points)
2002–04	NSW Waratahs	13	(20)
- Rugby league career

Playing information
- Position: Fullback
Club
Years	Team	Pld	T	G	FG	P
2005–07	Newcastle Knights	29	14	0	0	56

Milton Thaiday (born 15 February 1980) is an Australian former Torres Strait Islander rugby league player for the Newcastle Knights in the National Rugby League competition.

He is a cousin of Sam Thaiday of the Brisbane Broncos. In the 2005 season he scored 7 tries in 14 appearances.

Milton suffered a season-ending shoulder injury in round 5 and retired at the end of the 2007 season.

== Rugby union career ==
Thaiday played Super 14 Rugby for the New South Wales Waratahs, scoring a try when the Waratahs played the Pacific Islanders in June 2004.

== Career highlights ==
- Junior Club: Souths Townsville
- Career Stats: 2005–2007 Milton Thaiday played 29 games, scored 14 tries for a total of 56 points

He began his professional career in rugby union playing for the NSW Waratahs in Super 12 Rugby. He was discovered by rugby great Mark Ella while playing in a local competition at Lismore, northern NSW.
