= Keith Saunders (boxer) =

Australian boxer

Personal information
- Nationality: Indigenous Australian
- Born: Keith B. Saunders; 16 February 1934 South Cardiff, Australia
- Died: 18 November 2003 (aged 69) Australia
- Height: 5 ft 11.5 in (1.82 m)
- Weight: Welterweight

Boxing career
- Stance: orthodox

Boxing record
- Total fights: 38
- Wins: 12
- Win by KO: 10
- Losses: 25
- Draws: 0

Keith B. Saunders (16 February 1934 – 18 November 2003) was an indigenous Australian professional boxer and author of two books.

== Early life ==
Keith Saunders was born in South Cardiff, New South Wales on 16 February 1934 to Mary and Sidney Saunders. When he was ten years old his family moved to Redfern in Sydney.

== Professional career ==
Throughout his working life Saunders held a variety of jobs including laborer, truck driver, garbage collector and roller driver as well as experiencing periods of unemployment.

=== Boxing ===
Keith Saunders was spotted as a young teenager by Billy McConnell the owner of a gymnasium. He had his first amateur fight at the age of 13. Three years later he made it to the New South Wales State Amateur Boxing Finals.

He became a welterweight fighter and began fighting professionally in 1952. During training Keith served as a sparring partner for some of the world's best boxers. He experienced racism throughout his boxing career. He travelled to New Zealand in 1959 to compete against Samoan boxer Tuna Scanlan.

He retired from boxing in 1966 but made two comebacks in 1968 at the age of 32 and again in 1970 before retiring permanently.

=== Writing ===
Keith Saunders was awarded a grant of $2,273 in 1987 to write his biography. The book explored his boxing career "in the context of his personal history and the social and economic conditions of the period." Although he planned to have a ghost writer write his biography, after three failed attempts he wrote the book himself and it was published by Aboriginal Studies Press. He was interviewed by Heather Rusden when his first book the autobiography Learning the Ropes was released. In the interview he discusses his personal experiences of racism as an Aboriginal Australian. In the book, he describes how the Aborigines Protection Act 1909 in Australia regulated "most aspects of the lives of Aborigines".

His second book Myall Road focussed on life in Sydney in the 1950s and 1960s.

== Works ==
- Saunders, Keith B (1992), Learning the ropes, Canberra Aboriginal Studies Press, ISBN 978-0-85575-237-8
- Saunders, Keith B (1998), Myall Road, Canberra Aboriginal Studies Press, ISBN 978-0-85575-314-6
