= Corey Stewart (rugby league) =

Australian rugby league footballer (born 1971)

Personal information
- Full name: Corey Stewart
- Born: 20 April 1971 (age 55) Sydney, New South Wales, Australia

Playing information
- Position: Wing, Halfback, Fullback
Club
Years	Team	Pld	T	G	FG	P
1990	Eastern Suburbs	4	1	0	0	4
1993	Penrith Panthers	5	0	0	0	0
	Total	9	1	0	0	4
- Source: As of 15 January 2019
- Father: Bruce Stewart

Corey Stewart is an Australian former professional rugby league footballer who played in the 1990s in the NSWRL Competition.

Stewart began his Australian Rugby League career with Eastern Suburbs in 1990.

In 1993 Stewart joined the Penrith Panthers club. After leaving the Panthers, Stewart moved to Eden, New South Wales, where he later played for the Eden Tigers in the Group 16 Rugby League competition.

Stewart is the son of Bruce 'Larpa' Stewart who played for the club in the late 1960s.
