= Craig Dack =

Australian motorcycle racer

Craig Dack is an Australian motorcycle champion who has driven Yamaha Motor Australia's official Motocross team since retiring as a professional rider at the end of 1992.

As team owner/manager of CDR Monster energy Yamaha, Dack has assisted many riders to victory.

In 2006, Dack was appointed the Ambassador for Australia's motocross championship, the Nokia MX Nationals.
