= Jeff Leisk =

Australian motorcycle racer

- Nationality: Australian
- Born: 19 November 1964 (age 61) Perth, Australia

Motocross career
- Years active: 1984, 1988–1990
- Teams: Honda, KTM
- Wins: 3

Jeff Leisk (born 19 November 1964), is an Australian former professional motocross racer. He competed professionally in Australia, the United States and most prominently in the FIM Motocross World Championships where he became the first Australian to win a Motocross Grand Prix race in 1989. His international racing career along with those of Andrew McFarlane and Chad Reed helped focus attention on Australian motocross talent and, helped to pave the way for more Australian motorcyclists to compete in both Europe and the United States. In 2016, he was inducted into the Australian Motor Sport Hall of Fame.

== Motorsport career ==
=== Early racing ===
Leisk was born in Perth, Australia on 19 November 1964. His father was a former motorcycle speedway and motocross rider. Leisk began racing motorcycles in 1971 at the age of seven and by 1974, he competed in the first ever Australian Mini Cycle Championship where he won his displacement class. In 1978, he travelled to the United States for the World Mini Grand Prix where he won the world championship for his age group. In 1982, he won the 500cc Australian motocross championship at the age of 17 to become the youngest competitor at the time to win that class.

=== AMA Motocross Championships ===
After dominating the Australian motocross championships for several years, Leisk moved to the United States to compete in the 1986 AMA Motocross Championship. American Grand Prix racer Eddie Lawson offered Leisk a place to stay in his California home. Leisk became the first Australian to win an AMA heat race in 1987 and finished sixth in the AMA 125cc Motocross National Championship. In 1988, he moved up to the larger displacement classes, where he finished fourth in the 500cc class and sixth in the 250 class.

Leisk was given the opportunity to compete in the American round of the 1988 FIM 500cc Motocross World Championship held in Hollister, California. He made the most of the opportunity by winning the second heat race and finished third overall behind World Champions Eric Geboers (Honda) and David Thorpe (Honda). His performance at the United States Grand Prix earned him a contract to compete in the Motocross World Championships for the Honda-HRC factory racing team alongside Thorpe and Geboers for the 1989 season.

=== World championships ===
Leisk had an impressive World Championship debut at the opening round of the 1989 season in Holland. He led the first heat race only to run out of fuel with one and a half laps remaining. He rebounded by winning the second heat race by a comfortable margin. Leisk won the first overall victory of his career on 29 May 1989 at the 500cc Finnish Grand Prix where he finished ahead of Georges Jobé (Honda) and Kees van der Ven (KTM). His victory marked the first time that an Australian competitor won a Motocross Grand Prix. He also won the 500cc San Marino Grand Prix to put him into contention however, Thorpe won the final four Grand Prix races of the year to claim his third World Championship. Leisk overtook Geboers in the points standings at the final race of the season to claim second place in the World Championship.

Thorpe left the Honda team after the 1989 season leaving Leisk as Honda's top rider for the 1990 500cc Motocross World Championship. He was knocked unconscious in a crash during the season opening Dutch Grand Prix, then he broke his finger in a crash at the French Grand Prix which caused him to miss several rounds. When he returned to competition, he found that his finger restricted his riding capabilities and he dropped to tenth in the season final standings. At the 1990 Motocross des Nations event held in Vimmerby, Sweden, Liesk won a heat race and was the second highest 500cc individual points scorer behind Dirk Geukens. He retired from international competition after the 1990 season at the age of 26.

== Career overview ==
Leisk won six individual heat races and three Grand Prix victories during his world championship racing career. Although he never won a Motocross World Championship, he was the 1989 500cc Vice Champion and an eight-time Australian Motocross National Champion. Leisk was a member of four Australian teams at the Motocross des Nations (1985, 1988-1990).

== Later life ==
Leisk returned home to Perth, Australia where he worked at his father's plumbing business and began to compete in sprint car racing. He began to work for KTM Australia, rising to the role of General Manager. As the General Manager of KTM, he helped with the development of young riders in junior racing such as Craig Anderson and Toby Price.

== Motocross Grand Prix Results ==
Points system from 1984:

Position	1st	2nd	3rd	4th	5th	6th	7th	8th	9th	10th	11th	12th	13th	14th	15th
Points	20	17	15	13	11	10	9	8	7	6	5	4	3	2	1

Year	Class	Team	1		2		3		4		5		6		7		8		9		10		11		12		Pos	Pts
Year	Class	Team	R1	R2	R1	R2	R1	R2	R1	R2	R1	R2	R1	R2	R1	R2	R1	R2	R1	R2	R1	R2	R1	R2	R1	R2	Pos	Pts
1984	250cc	Honda	FRA -	FRA -	AUT -	AUT -	YUG -	YUG -	CZE -	CZE -	UK; 8	UK; 15	ITA -	ITA -	GER -	GER -	USA -	USA -	NED -	NED -	BEL -	BEL -	CH -	CH -	FIN -	FIN -	37th	9
1988	500cc	Honda	AUT -	AUT -	CH -	CH -	SWE -	SWE -	FIN -	FIN -	GER -	GER -	ITA -	ITA -	USA; 6	USA; 1	UK -	UK -	NED -	NED -	SM -	SM -	BEL -	BEL -	LUX -	LUX -	20th	45
1989	500cc	Honda	NED -	NED; 1	FRA; 4	FRA; 14	AUT; 5	AUT -	ITA; 2	ITA; 4	FIN; 3	FIN; 1	SWE; 11	SWE; 9	USA; 4	USA; 4	SM; 1	SM; 2	UK; 2	UK; 3	BEL; 1	BEL; 4	LUX; 9	LUX; 4	CH; 9	CH; 3	2nd	293
1990	500cc	Honda	NED -	NED -	CH; 1	CH; 9	AUT; 5	AUT; 9	FRA; 2	FRA; 3	FIN -	FIN -	ITA -	ITA -	UK; 4	UK -	GER -	GER -	SM -	SM -	BEL -	BEL -	LUX; 6	LUX -	USA -	USA; 5	10th	111
