= Wilfred Thomas Prince =

Australian Aboriginal Paralympian

Wilfred Thomas Prince was born 13 October 1960 at Cherbourg Aboriginal Mission in Queensland, Australia. He is affectionately known as 'Willie'. He carried the Paralympic Torch in Brisbane during 2000 Olympics and is active in the Aboriginal and Torres Strait Islander community.

== Early life ==
Willie was hospitalised 16 times as a child, nearly dying on two occasions. His illness was brought to the attention of the Chief Protector of Aborigines and he was transferred to Children's Hospital in Brisbane for further medical observation. He was diagnosed with cerebral palsy when he was about two years old. Willie was then transferred to Xavier Home for Crippled Children run by the Catholic Church Franciscan Missionaries of Mercy. When he was 12 years of age he was moved to a hostel run by Queensland Spastic Welfare Association.

== Sporting Achievements ==
Willie carried the Paralympic Torch in Brisbane during 2000 Olympics. He is a member of the Queensland Sporting Wheelies and also has an important role in the Aboriginal and Torres Strait Islander Disability Network of Queensland.

== Career ==
Willie started his career at the State Library of Queensland in 1986, working in a number of different departments over the past twenty years.
