= Bruce Stewart (rugby league) =

Indigenous Australian rugby league footballer

Personal information
- Born: 10 January 1941; Sydney, New South Wales, Australia
- Died: 2 April 2012 (aged 71)

Playing information
- Position: Wing
Club
Years	Team	Pld	T	G	FG	P
1967–68	Eastern Suburbs	26	10	0	0	30
- Father: Corey Stewart (son)

Bruce 'Lapa' Stewart (1941–2012), an Indigenous Australian, was a rugby league footballer in the New South Wales Rugby League, playing as a winger.

A La Perouse local, Stewart played for South Sydney in the junior and lower grades before joining the Eastern Suburbs club in 1967, where he scored 10 tries from his 24 appearances. He also represented NSW Country firsts.

Stewart died on 2 April 2012.

His son, Corey Stewart, also played for Eastern Suburbs.
