= Sam Thaiday =

Australia international rugby league footballer

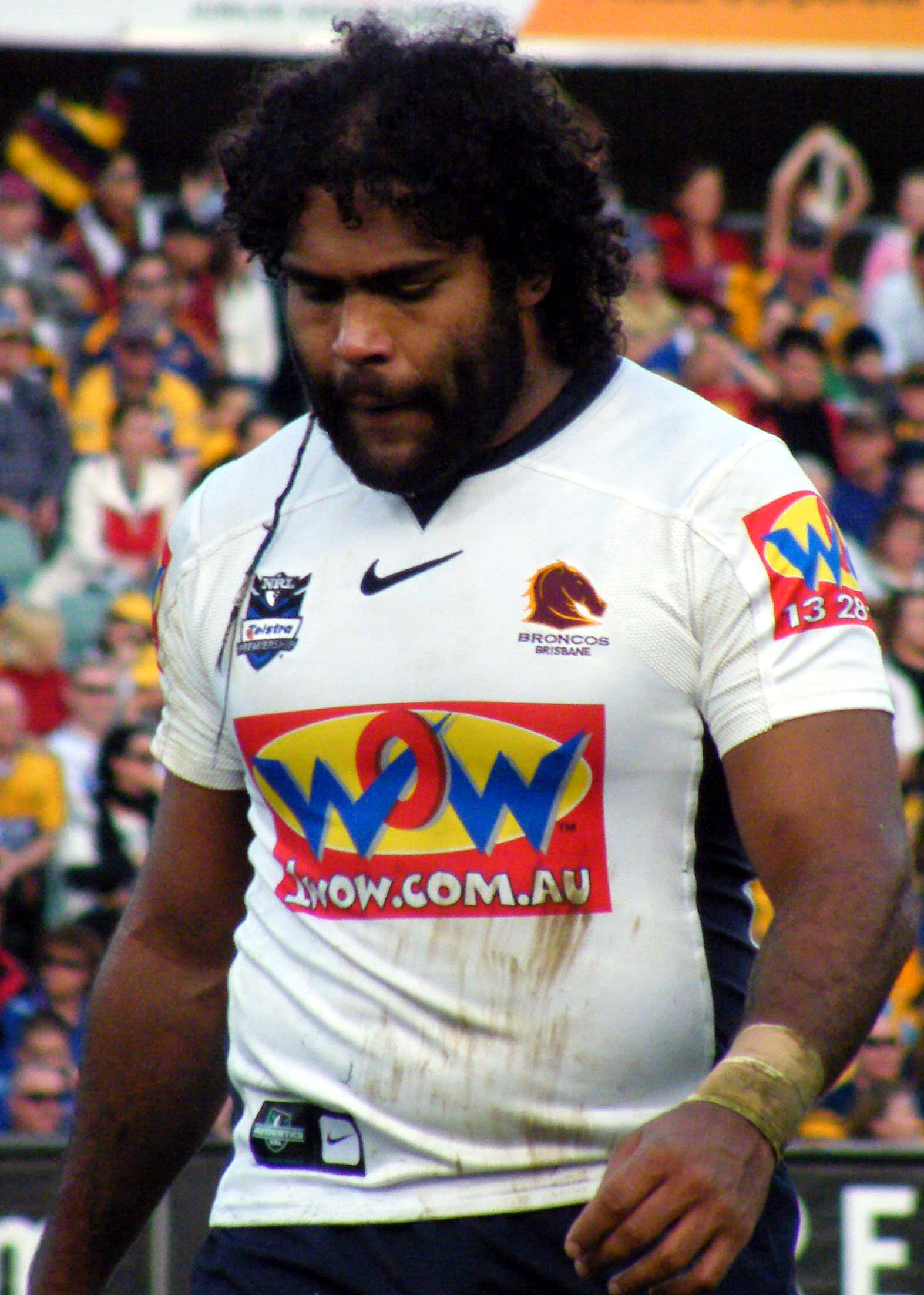

Personal information
- Full name: Samuel Arthur Thaiday
- Born: 12 June 1985 (age 41) Sydney, New South Wales, Australia

Playing information
- Height: 181 cm (5 ft 11 in)
- Weight: 112 kg (17 st 9 lb)
- Position: Second-row, Prop
Club
Years	Team	Pld	T	G	FG	P
2003–18	Brisbane Broncos	304	40	1	0	162
Representative
Years	Team	Pld	T	G	FG	P
2006–17	Queensland	29	3	0	0	12
2006–17	Australia	34	2	0	0	8
2007–13	Prime Minister's XIII	2	0	0	0	0
2010–16	Indigenous All Stars	3	0	0	0	0
- Education: Kirwan State High School
- Alma mater: St Leo's College
- Relatives: Milton Thaiday (cousin)

Samuel Arthur Thaiday (/θaɪdeɪ/; born 12 June 1985) is an Australian former professional rugby league footballer who played for the Brisbane Broncos in the National Rugby League, serving as their captain from 2012 until 2013. An Australian international and Queensland State of Origin representative second-row, he could also play prop and lock as well as hooker and spent all of his career at the Broncos, with whom he won the 2006 premiership. In 2008, Australia's centenary of rugby league and Thaiday's sixth year at the top level, he was one of only three current players to be named in the Indigenous Australian rugby league team of the century. On 6 July 2018, Thaiday announced his intention to retire from the NRL at the end of the 2018 season.

He currently plays for the Samford Stags in the Brisbane open men’s division 2 competition.

== Background ==
Thaiday was born in Sydney, New South Wales and moved to Townsville, Queensland at the age of four years. He is of Torres Strait Islander descent. He played junior rugby league for the Brothers club in Townsville as well as attending Kirwan State High School. His cousin Milton Thaiday also became an NRL footballer.

Thaiday's father, Billy, was born on Yam Island in the Torres Strait and was working on Thursday Island, before becoming part of the Royal Australian Air Force (RAAF). He signed up for RAAF, when needed the RAAF needed men and women from the Torres Strait Islands to serve in mainland Australia. His mother, Julie Thaiday, grew up in rural Western Australia and also served in the Royal Australian Air Force.

== Playing career ==
=== 2000s ===
Thaiday was signed in 2002 by the Brisbane Broncos after coach Wayne Bennett watched him brawl with Sonny Bill Williams and Tom Learoyd-Lahrs in an under-17s interstate game. On 11 July 2003, aged 18, he made his National Rugby League debut for the Broncos against the Bulldogs in round 18 of the 2003 NRL season. It was to be his only appearance of the season. He followed it up with 8 appearances off the bench in the 2004 NRL season, before featuring in 14 matches in the 2005 NRL season. He started for the first time in his career in Round 2 of that season, however, played the other 13 matches off the bench. Thaiday scored his first career try in Round 26 of 2005 against the Parramatta Eels.

Solid form in the first 10 weeks of the Broncos season earned Thaiday a spot on the Queensland bench for game one of the 2006 State of Origin series. He was also selected on the bench for the following two games for the Maroons, who went on to win the series. After that, when the Broncos were in the "slump that wasn't a slump", coach Wayne Bennett moved Thaiday from the bench to the starting side. This, among other changes, saw the Broncos' season turn around, and they ended up winning the 2006 NRL Grand Final. Thaiday was selected for his international debut for the Australian national team in Game 2 of the 2006 Tri-Nations against New Zealand after concussion ruled Willie Mason out. He would also feature against Great Britain 2 weeks later, however did not play in Australia's victory in the Final.

As 2006 NRL Premiers, the Brisbane Broncos travelled to England to face 2006 Super League champions, St Helens R.F.C. in the 2007 World Club Challenge. Thaiday played from the interchange bench in the Broncos' 14–18 loss. In the 2007 NRL season Thaiday suffered an injury to the bone around his eye socket and missed all three games of the 2007 State of Origin series for the Queensland Maroons while waiting to recover. In a Round 2 match against the New Zealand Warriors, with regular goal kickers Darren Lockyer and Corey Parker missing from the side, Thaiday stepped up to take 2 conversion attempts, making 1 of them. Thaiday struggled to find a place in the Broncos side in 2007, bouncing from between the bench and the starting back row while also lining up at lock and five-eighth. He made his 50th first-grade appearance in the NRL in 2007 and re-signed with the Broncos until the end of 2009. Due to his indifferent form, he failed to be selected for either of Australia's two test matches in 2007.

In the 2008 NRL season Thaiday was back in form and started the year with a bang, winning back to back man of the match awards in rounds eight and nine to earn himself a starting spot in the 2008 State of Origin series. After scoring only 4 tries in his previous 5 seasons, he bagged 8 in 2008, including an impressive haul of 5 in 4 games between Round 18 and Round 21. It would be the most tries scored in a season across his career.

Sam Thaiday in action against the Knights in 2008

He was named in the Australia training squad for the 2008 Rugby League World Cup, however did not make the final squad.

In April 2009, Thaiday was named in the 25-man Queensland squad before the opening match of the 2009 State of Origin series. He was named man of the match in the second game of the series.

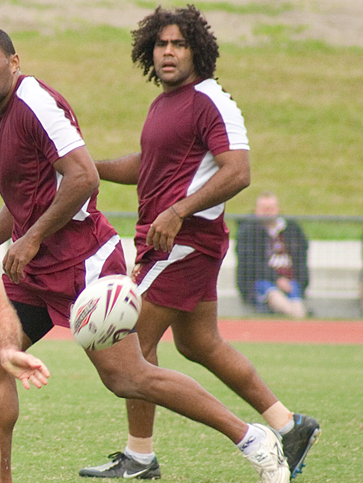
Thaiday training with Queensland in 2009

At club level, Thaiday continued to consistently perform for Brisbane.

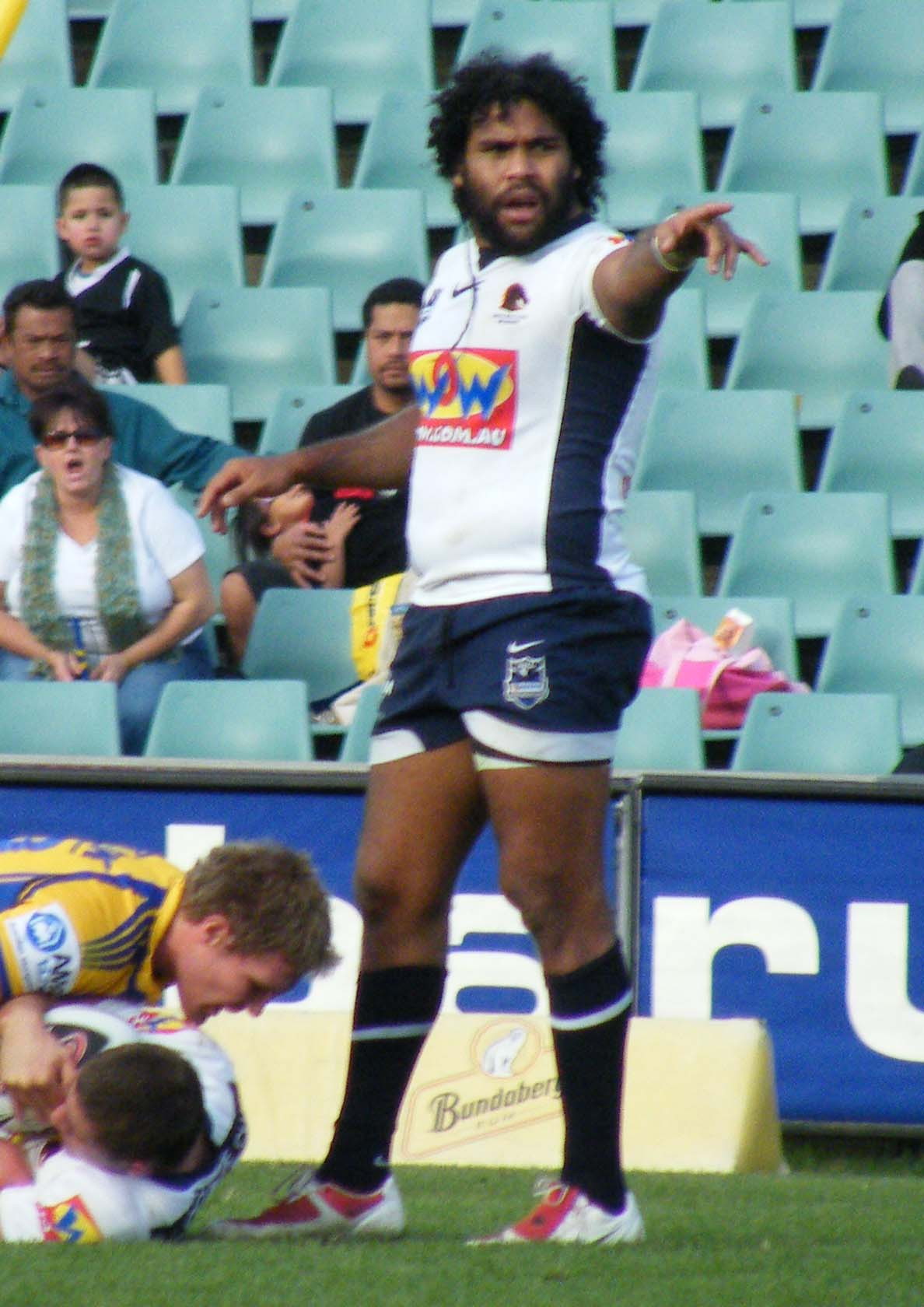
Thaiday playing for the Broncos in 2009

At the end of that season, Thaiday played for Australia in its successful 2009 Four Nations campaign in Europe, playing 3 matches off the bench and representing his nation for the first time since 2006.

=== 2010s ===
For the 2010 ANZAC Test, Thaiday was selected to play for Australia at second-row forward and was named man of the match in its victory against New Zealand. During his career, Thaiday was often attacked for how he plays the game, most notably his tendency to enter brawls and scuffles late to "protect" his teammates. In the 2010 State of Origin series Thaiday was much maligned by NSW Blues fans for how he played the game. In Game 2, Luke O'Donnell performed a dangerous tackle that sparked an all-in brawl, the likes of which hadn't been seen for several years. Most notable was a moment towards the end of the melee in which O'Donnell could be seen to headbutt and then uppercut Queensland's Dave Taylor, after which Thaiday re-entered the fray and punched O'Donnell twice. Speaking on his involvement Thaiday said, "I saw the headbutt and I made a bee-line straight over to it. That's just not football; fair is fair if you want to punch on with a bloke I'm all for that. But headbutting – that's a bit below the belt". In a 2010 NRL game, between the Broncos and the North Queensland Cowboys, Thaiday again came under criticism, again for entering a fight as the "Third-man-in" (though technically he was fourth). The NRL match review committee chairman Greg McCallum issued Thaiday a warning for his repeat infringements and threatened him with a ban. McCallum said that Thaiday was treading a fine line rushing in to "protect" teammates he felt had been aggrieved. Thaiday continued his consistent performances for Brisbane, cementing his place as a starter in the side. Thaiday scored his first Origin try in Game 1, proving the difference in their 28–24 victory. Queensland would go on to win the series 3–0, the first series sweep since 2000. Thaiday also featured in all 5 of Australia's test matches, all as a starter. Thaiday also featured in the inaugural All-Stars match before the start of the season, lining up for the Indigenous All Stars in their 16–12 victory.

In 2011 it was announced that Thaiday would be the Broncos' captain for the following season, taking over from the retiring Darren Lockyer despite the return to the club of former Broncos favourite Petero Civoniceva. An experiment with starting Thaiday at prop was abandoned by Round 8, with him returning to the back row for the rest of the season. Thaiday missed the Broncos first two finals matches through suspension, however, returned to captain the Broncos in Lockyer's absence in the Preliminary Final against the Manly-Warringah Sea Eagles, leading his side to a gallant 26–14 defeat in his first NRL match as captain. Thaiday once again featured in all 3 matches in the State of Origin. After the 2011 NRL season, Thaiday travelled with the Australian national team to Britain for the 2011 Four Nations tournament, appearing in all 4 matches in the tournament to take his season test tally to 6. In the Final against England, Thaiday scored his first international try. On 3 November 2011 The annual RLIF Awards dinner was held at the Tower of London and Thaiday was named second-row forward of the year.

Thaiday again featured in the front row sporadically in the 2012 season, however, this was mostly due to injury. As captain, Thaiday came under criticism for the Broncos inability to win tight matches and was particularly under fire when they lost six consecutive matches late in the season. Despite this, Brisbane scraped into the finals in the eighth position, being eliminated in a 33–16 loss to the North Queensland Cowboys in the first week. Thaiday played for Australia in its victory in the 2012 ANZAC Test against New Zealand. He also played in Game I of the 2012 State of Origin series but had to pull out of Game II with a shoulder injury. He would return for Game 3 and return to the Test arena at the end of year test.

Thaiday's switch to front row seemed to be made permanent in the 2013 NRL season, starting his first 14 games in that position before once again reverting to the second row. An inconsistent season saw the Broncos miss the finals for the first time since 2010, with Thaiday criticised for not getting the team on track for "Life after Locky". Thaiday was selected for Australia in the 2013 ANZAC Test and played at second-row forward. In what was the first test match ever played in Canberra, New Zealand were defeated. Thaiday played at second-row forward in all three games, and scored a try in the 2nd game, of the 2013 State of Origin series in which Queensland extended its record for consecutive series victories to eight. He featured 5 times for Australia in the 2013 Rugby League World Cup, playing a key role in their success.

In 2014, Thaiday failed to play 20 games for the first time since 2007, missing much of April and all of May through injury. He had also stepped down as captain, with Corey Parker leading the side. Thaiday was again moved from his standard second-row position, this time playing Lock in the back half of the season, as the Broncos again finished eighth and again were eliminated in the first week by the Cowboys. Thaiday missed Game 1 of the 2014 State of Origin series but returned to play in the second and third games as Queensland lost the series for the first time since 2005, also marking the first time in his Origin career that Thaiday had lost a series. He also missed the ANZAC test but reclaimed his spot for the 2014 Four Nations.

In 2015, Thaiday returned to his best under supercoach Wayne Bennett. He started the season switching between the second row, prop, lock and the bench, before cementing a spot at prop in Round 18 and holding it for the remainder of the season. Thaiday featured in the second grand final of his career, starting at prop in the Broncos heartbreaking 17–16 defeat, once again to the Cowboys. He featured in all 3 games of Queensland's successful Origin campaign and featured in Australia's victorious ANZAC Test.

In 2016, Thaiday was selected to play for Queensland in the 2016 state of origin series. After Queensland emerged victorious in game 1 of the series, Thaiday was interviewed post-match by Brad Fittler. Fittler had asked how it felt defeating New South Wales after a tough match. Thaiday told Fittler "It was a bit like losing your virginity, it wasn't very nice but we got the job done". On the field, Thaiday's production began to noticeably decline. He began the season coming off the bench, however, returned to his usual position in the second row after Round 19. The Broncos were able to finish fifth in an extremely tight 2016 NRL season, before falling to the Cowboys yet again, this time in the second week. He once again featured in all 3 Origin games, however, was relegated to the bench for Australia, playing the entire 2016 Four Nations in that role.

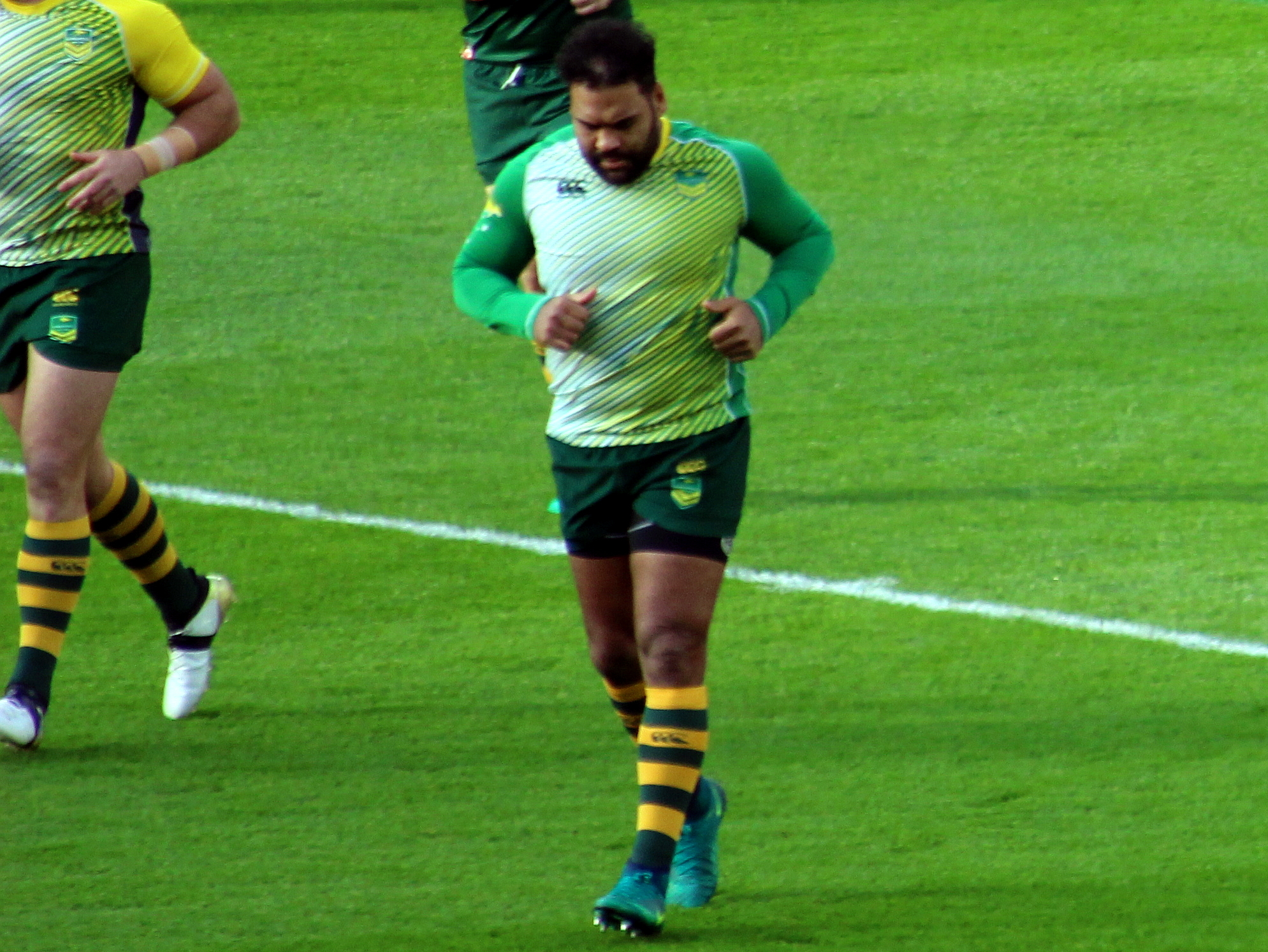
Thaiday warming up for the Kangaroos in London in 2016

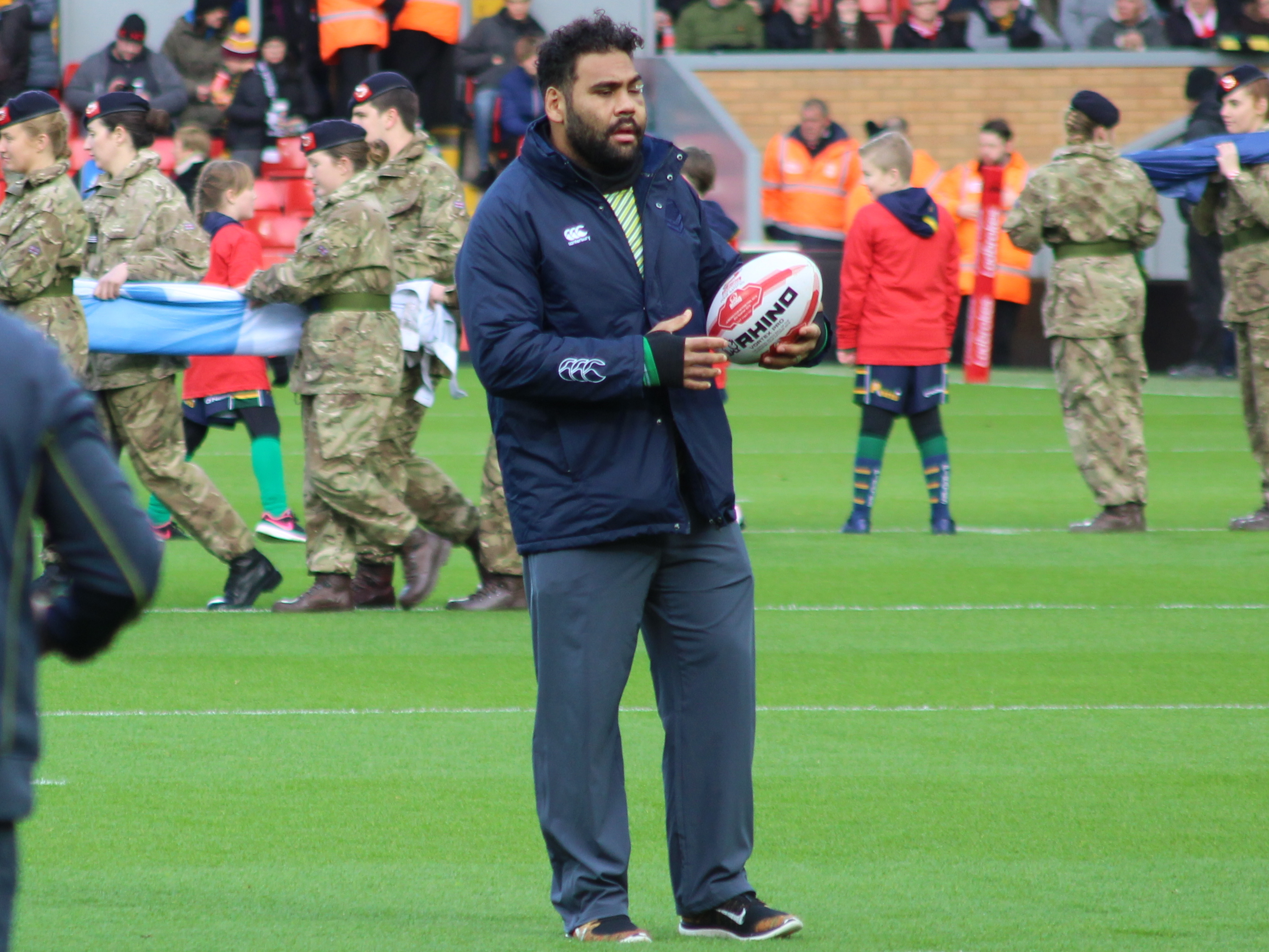
An injured Thaiday on international duty at Anfield in 2016

In 2017, Thaiday's decline was showcased to the rugby league community. He spent much of the 2017 NRL season on the bench, sporadically appearing in the back row, before finding a spot at hooker then at prop by the end of the season. Thaiday was relegated to the bench for Queensland under new coach Kevin Walters, before being dropped entirely following Queensland's Game 1 defeat, ending his Origin career. Similarly, his Australian career ended after the ANZAC Test.

==== Retirement ====
On 6 July 2018, Thaiday announced his retirement from rugby league in bizarre circumstances. Thaiday dressed as an elderly man and had called a press conference outside a Brisbane retirement home to confirm he would draw the curtain on his 16-season career. Thaiday explained why he had dressed in such a way saying "I’ve always been a bit different in everything I’ve done but I’ve always been true to myself and done things my way".

A week after his announcement, after the Broncos played the Warriors at Suncorp Stadium, the Warriors offered Thaiday a farewell with the team, wishing him the best for the future. "We did the same thing with (Johnathan Thurston) a couple of weeks ago … we think it’s important the people that have been a big part of the game and achieved everything, it’s important for our group to show some respect for them", Blake Green said.

In the 2018 NRL season, Thaiday again started at prop for a majority of the season. In Round 22 of the season, Thaiday played his 300th first-grade match, ironically against the Cowboys. Thaiday's last regular-season match was played in front of a sellout crowd at Suncorp Stadium, as fans watched the Broncos defeat Manly. The Broncos returned to Suncorp a week later in an Elimination Final match with the St George Illawarra Dragons. Despite being heavy favourites, the Broncos capitulated 48–18, being knocked out and ending Thaiday's career.

Thaiday is widely considered an NRL great, appearing in 304 matches, all for the Brisbane Broncos. Despite only scoring more than 5 tries in a season once, Thaiday's long career resulted in a career total of 40 tries. He featured 29 times for Queensland, becoming a key piece of the side which won 10 Origin titles in 11 seasons. He represented his country 34 times, winning a Tri-Nations, 3 Four Nations and a World Cup title.

== Post playing ==
Since 2017, Thaiday has been an ambassador for the Starlight Foundation. In 2023, Thaiday was named as an ambassador for Beef and Livestock Australia's Christmas red meat campaign. Thaiday also made an appearance in QRL playing in the grand final match of Samford v Burpengary.. On 18 January 2025. It was announced that Thaiday joined the 2025 cast of I'm a Celebrity...Get Me Out of Here!.On 16 February 2025, Thaiday was announced as the winner of the 2025 season of I'm a Celeb.

== Career stats ==
Season	Team	Appearances	Tries	Goals	Goal-kicking percentage	Field goals	Points
2003 NRL Season	Brisbane Broncos	1	-	-	-	-	-
2004 NRL Season	Brisbane Broncos	8	-	-	-	-	-
2005 NRL Season	Brisbane Broncos	14	1	-	-	-	4
2006 NRL Season	Brisbane Broncos	20	2	-	-	-	8
2007 NRL Season	Brisbane Broncos	16	1	1/2	50%	-	6
2008 NRL Season	Brisbane Broncos	22	8	-	-	-	32
2009 NRL Season	Brisbane Broncos	23	3	-	-	-	12
2010 NRL Season	Brisbane Broncos	22	2	-	-	-	8
2011 NRL Season	Brisbane Broncos	21	3	-	-	-	12
2012 NRL Season	Brisbane Broncos	21	4	-	-	-	16
2013 NRL Season	Brisbane Broncos	21	2	-	-	-	8
2014 NRL Season	Brisbane Broncos	19	4	-	-	-	16
2015 NRL Season	Brisbane Broncos	23	2	-	-	-	8
2016 NRL Season	Brisbane Broncos	22	4	-	-	-	16
2017 NRL Season	Brisbane Broncos	26	3	-	-	-	12
2018 NRL Season	Brisbane Broncos	25	1	-	-	-	4
	Totals	304	40	1			162

== Accolades ==
Dally M Second Rower of the Year: 2010, 2011

Ron McAuliffe Medal: 2010

Ken Stephen Memorial Award: 2011

RLIF Second Rower of the Year: 2011
