= Craig Anderson (motocross) =

Australian motorcycle racer

Craig "Ando" Anderson is an Australian professional motocross racer from West Wallsend in the Hunter Valley Region of New South Wales.

In 2003, Anderson travelled to the United States to compete in the AMA 125cc national championship for the Yamaha of Troy team, he finished the year in seventh place overall and collected one win at Southwick, Massachusetts. In 2004, he moved up to the 250cc AMA national championship where he finished in 17th place overall. Anderson realised his future lay back in Australia, so he returned specifically to ride for Honda in the 2005 and 2006 seasons. In 2006, Anderson won the Australian Motocross title for Honda making it his 12th championship.
